= Quebec Route 101 =

Highway in Quebec

Route 101

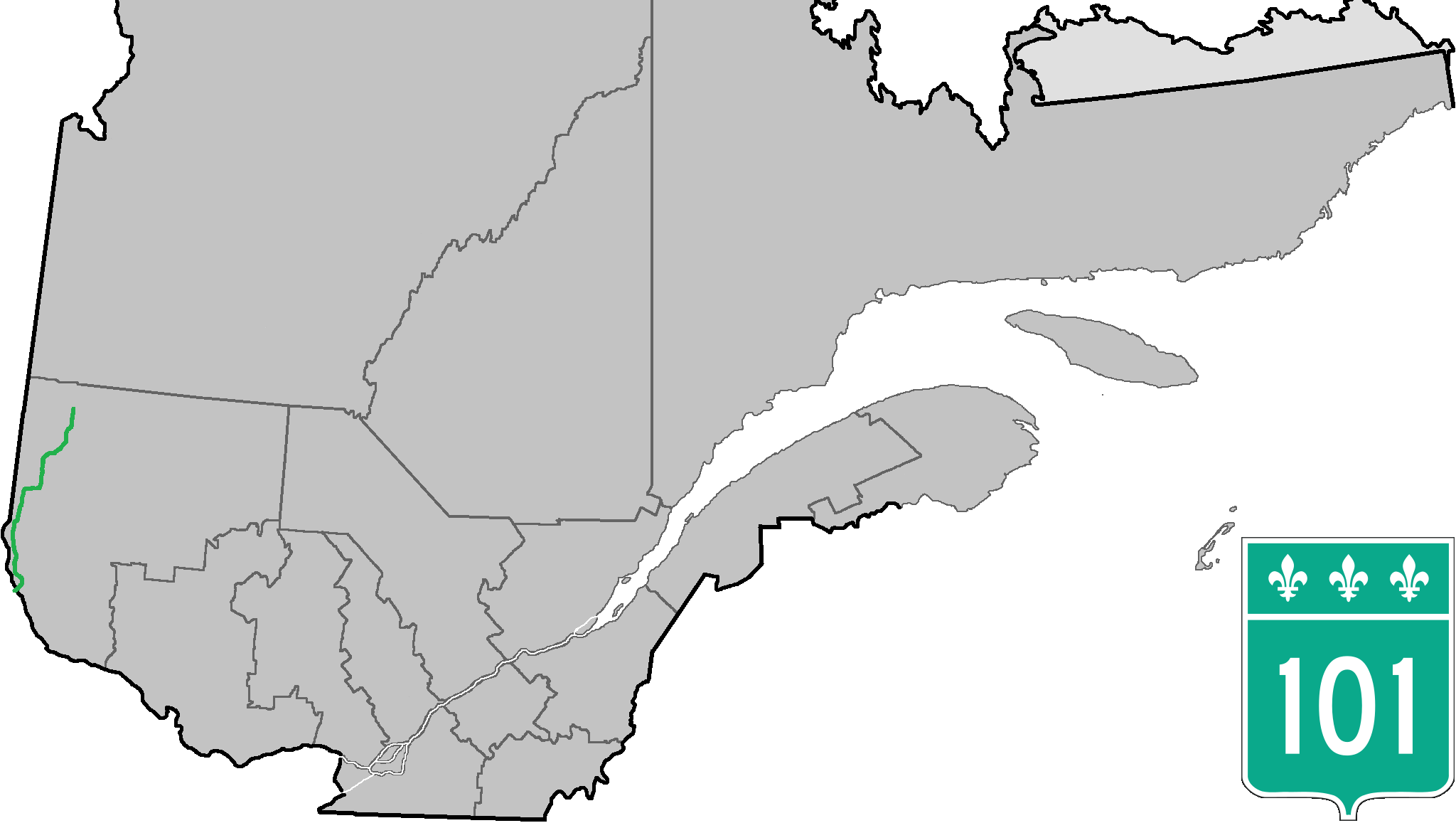

Route information
- Maintained by Transports Québec
- Length: 289.3 km (179.8 mi)
- History: Route 46

Major junctions
- South end: Highway 63 in Thorne, Ontario
- R-117 (TCH) in Rouyn-Noranda
- North end: R-111 in Macamic

Location
- Country: Canada
- Province: Quebec

Highway system
- Quebec provincial highways; Autoroutes; List; Former
← A-85	→ R-104

Route 101 is a north–south highway in northwestern Quebec. The highway begins at Route 111 in Macamic and ends at Témiscaming, a town bordering with Thorne, Ontario on the Ottawa River. It continues south as Highway 63 to North Bay, Ontario.

== Municipalities along Route 101 ==
- Témiscaming
- Laniel
- Saint-Édouard-de-Fabre
- Ville-Marie
- Duhamel-Ouest
- Saint-Bruno-de-Guigues
- Notre-Dame-du-Nord
- Nédélec
- Rémigny
- Rouyn-Noranda
- Sainte-Germaine-Boulé
- Taschereau
- Poularies
- Macamic

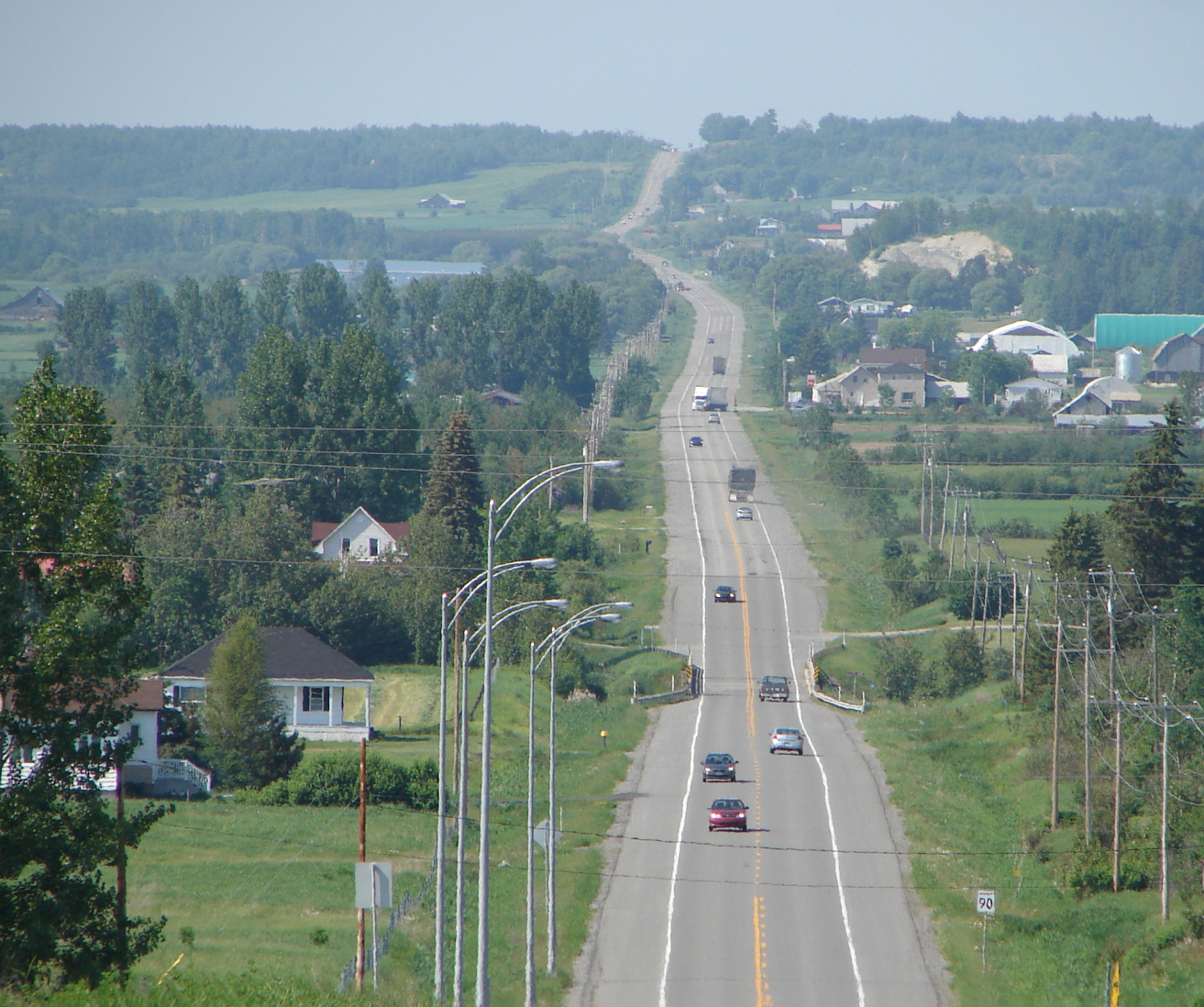
Route 101 near Saint-Bruno-de-Guigues

== Major intersections ==
RCM	Location	km	mi	Destinations	Notes
Témiscamingue	Témiscaming	0.0	0.0	Highway 63 south – North Bay	Continuation into Ontario
Témiscamingue	Témiscaming	0.0	0.0	Crosses the Ottawa River (French: Rivière des Outaouais)	
Témiscamingue	Saint-Édouard-de-Fabre	76.2	47.3	R-391 north – Béarn, Lorrainville	
Témiscamingue	Ville-Marie	90.2	56.0	R-382 east – Lorrainville	
Témiscamingue	Notre-Dame-du-Nord			Crosses the Ottawa River (French: Rivière des Outaouais)	
Témiscamingue	Notre-Dame-du-Nord	123.2	76.6	Rue Ontario west – Temiskaming Shores	To Ontario Highway 65
Témiscamingue	Rémigny	162.5	101.0	R-391 south – Rémigny, Laverlochère-Angliers	South end of R-391 concurrency
Rouyn-Noranda		192.9	119.9	R-391 north – Cloutier, Beaudry	North end of R-391 concurrency
Rouyn-Noranda		204.5	127.1	R-117 (TCH) north – Kirkland Lake	South end of R-117 concurrency
Rouyn-Noranda		223.5	138.9	R-117 (TCH) south – Rouyn-Noranda	North end of R-117 concurrency
Rouyn-Noranda		257.6	160.1	R-393 north – Duparquet, La Sarre	
Abitibi-Ouest	Poularies	278.3	172.9	R-390 – Palmarolle, Taschereau	
Abitibi-Ouest	Macamic	289.3	179.8	R-111 – La Sarre, Authier, Amos	
1.000 mi = 1.609 km; 1.000 km = 0.621 mi: Concurrency terminus; Route transition

== See also ==
- List of Quebec provincial highways
