= Quebec Route 111 =

Highway in Quebec, Canada

Route 111

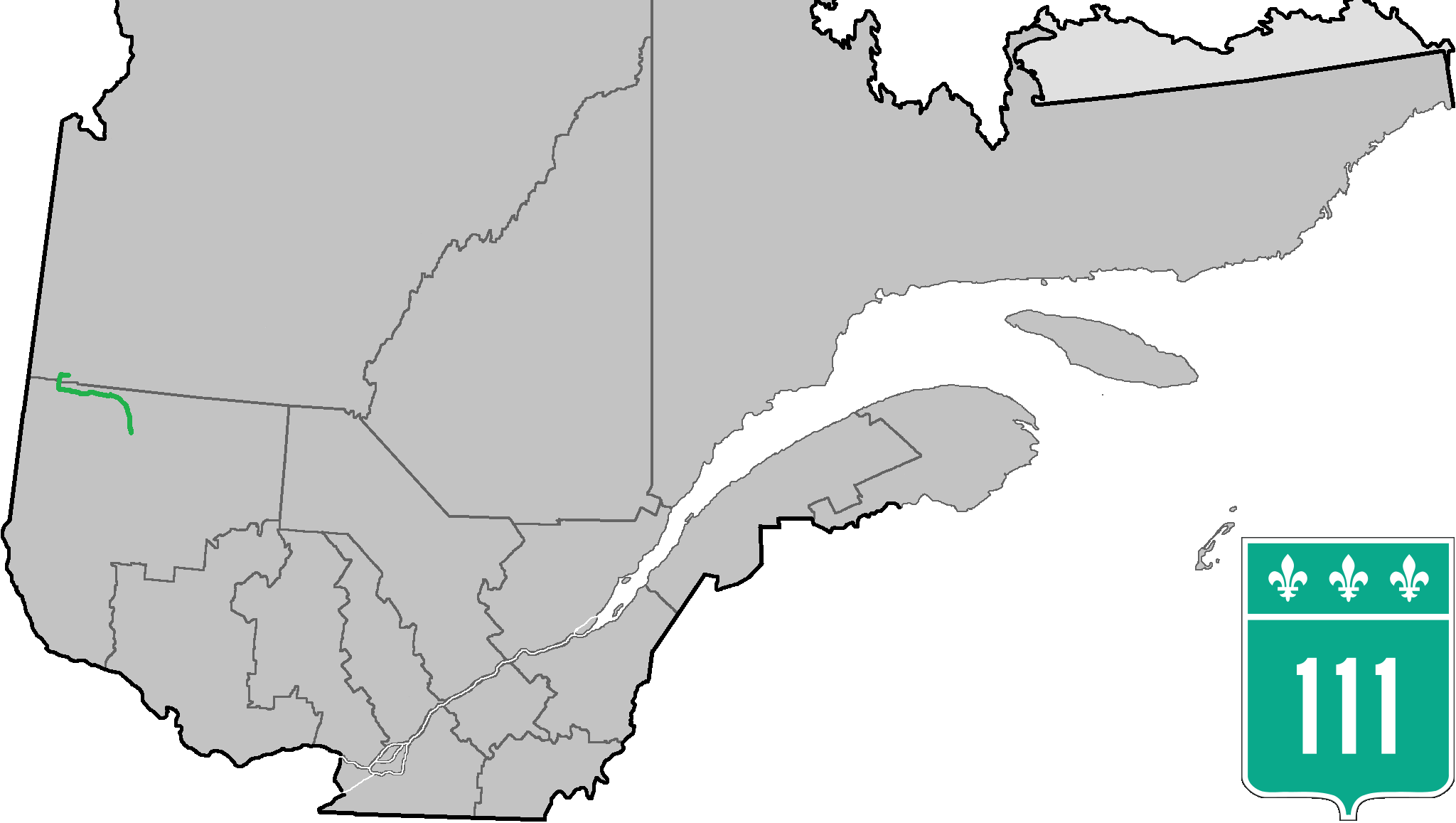

Route information
- Maintained by Transports Québec
- Length: 204.4 km (127.0 mi)

Major junctions
- South end: R-117 (TCH) in Val-d'Or
- R-386 in Saint-Marc-de-Figuery; R-109 / R-395 in Amos; R-399 in Trécesson; R-390 in Taschereau; R-101 in Macamic; R-393 in La Sarre
- North end: R-393 in Eeyou Istchee Baie-James

Location
- Country: Canada
- Province: Quebec
- Major cities: Val-d'Or, Amos, La Sarre

Highway system
- Quebec provincial highways; Autoroutes; List; Former
← R-109	→ R-112

Route 111 is a north/south highway on the north shore of the Saint-Lawrence River in the Abitibi-Témiscamingue region of Quebec, Canada. Its northern terminus is in the municipality of Eeyou Istchee Baie-James at the junction of Route 393, and its southern terminus is in Val-d'Or at the junction of Route 117.

== Municipalities along Route 111 ==
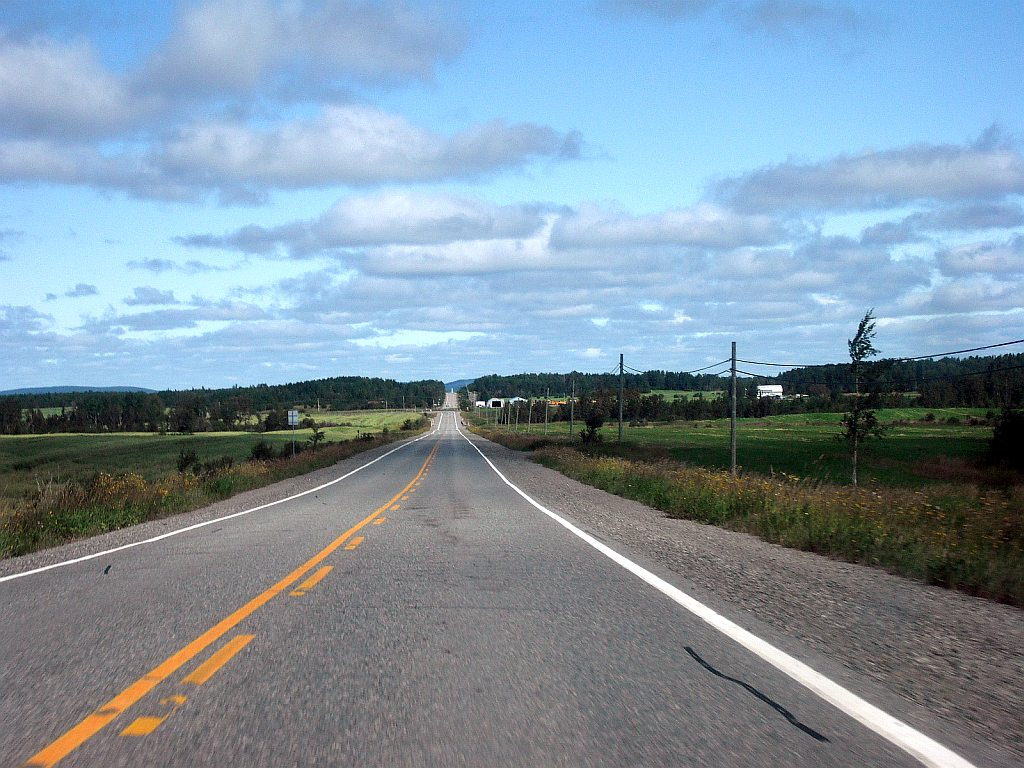
Quebec Route 111 in Authier

- Val-d'Or
- La Corne
- Saint-Marc-de-Figuery
- Amos
- Trécesson
- Launay
- Taschereau
- Authier
- Macamic
- La Sarre
- Dupuy
- Clermont
- Normétal
- Eeyou Istchee Baie-James

== Major intersections ==
RCM or ET	Municipality	Km	Junction	Notes
Southern terminus of Route 111
La Vallée-de-l'Or	Val-d'Or	0.0	R-117 (TCH)	117 NORTH: to Rouyn-Noranda; 117 SOUTH: to Mont-Laurier
Abitibi	Saint-Marc-de-Figuery	58.1	(West end)	386 EAST: to Senneterre
Abitibi	Amos	63.8	R-395	395 NORTH: to La Morandière-Rochebaucourt
Abitibi	Amos	65.6	R-109	109 SOUTH: to Rivière-Héva
Abitibi	Amos	65.6	R-395	395 SOUTH: to Preissac
Abitibi	Amos	66.9	R-109	109 NORTH: to Matagami
Abitibi	Trécesson	76.6	(South end)	399 NORTH: to Berry
Abitibi	Launay	100.5	Chemin des 6e et 10e rang	NORTH: to Lac-Chicobi
Abitibi-Ouest	Taschereau	112.5	R-390 (East end)	390 WEST: to Poularies
Abitibi-Ouest	Authier	132.9	Chemin Principale	NORTH: to Authier-Nord
Abitibi-Ouest	Macamic	143.4	R-101 (North end)	101 SOUTH: to Rouyn-Noranda
Abitibi-Ouest	La Sarre	159.2	R-393	393 SOUTH: to Sainte-Hélène-de-Mancebourg
Abitibi-Ouest	La Sarre	161.1	R-393	393 NORTH: to Clermont
Abitibi-Ouest	Dupuy	179.4	Chemin-du-1e-et-10e-rang	WEST: to La Reine
Jamésie	Eeyou Istchee Baie-James	204.4	R-393	WEST: to R-393 in Clermont
Northern terminus of Route 111

== See also ==
- List of Quebec provincial highways
