= Quebec Route 117 =

Highway in Quebec

Route 117
- Route Transcanadienne
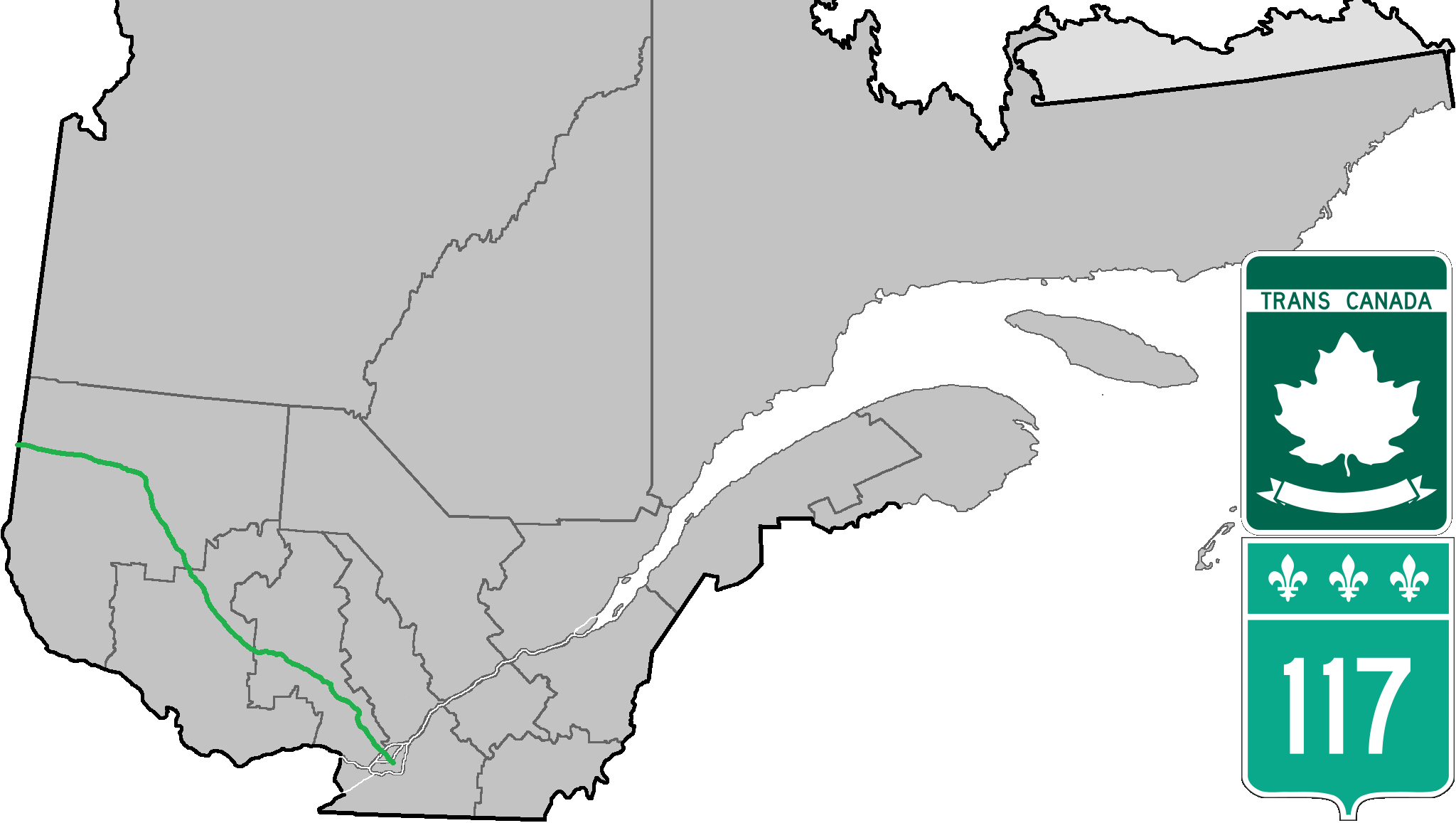

Route information
- Maintained by Transports Québec
- Length: 663.9 km (412.5 mi)
- History: Route 11 (Laval – Grand-Remous); Route 11A (Montreal – Laval); Route 58 (Grand-Remous – Louvicourt); Route 59 (Louvicourt – Ontario border)

Major junctions
- South end: A-15 / A-40 (TCH) in Montreal
- A-440 in Laval; A-15 (TCH) in Laval; A-640 in Rosemère; A-50 in Mirabel; R-158 in Saint-Jérôme; R-107 in Mont-Laurier; R-105 in Grand-Remous; R-111 / R-113 in Val-d'Or; R-109 in Rivière-Héva; R-101 in Rouyn-Noranda
- North end: Highway 66 / TCH near McGarry, ON

Location
- Country: Canada
- Province: Quebec
- Major cities: Montréal, Laval, Saint-Jérôme

Highway system
- Trans-Canada Highway; Quebec provincial highways; Autoroutes; List; Former
← R-116	→ R-122

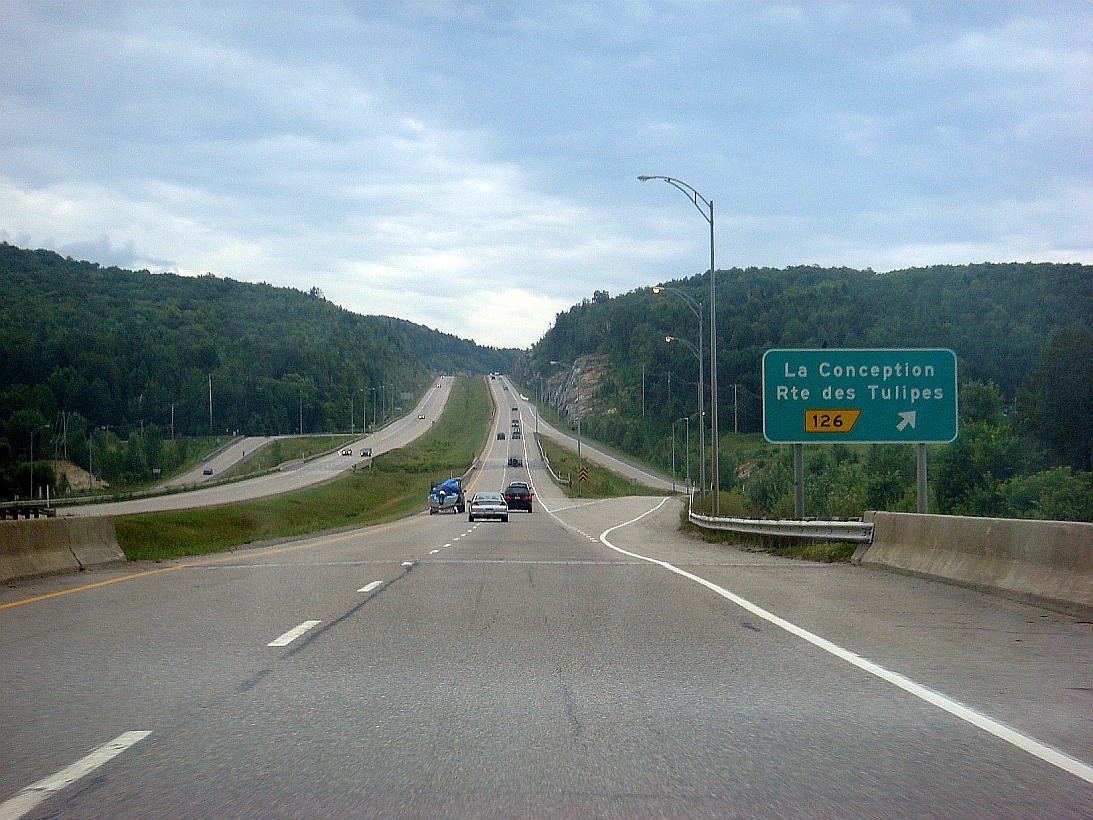
Route 117 at La Conception

Route 117, the Trans Canada Highway Northern Route, is a provincial highway within the Canadian province of Quebec, running between Montreal and the Quebec/Ontario border where it continues as Highway 66 east of McGarry, Ontario. It is an important road since it is the only direct route between southern Quebec and the Abitibi-Témiscamingue region.

Route 117 was formerly Route 11 and ran from Montreal north towards Mont-Laurier and then followed the Gatineau River south towards Gatineau. This routing is joined with Autoroute 15 from Montreal northwards towards Mont Tremblant. Route 117 also takes in the former Quebec Routes 58 and 59.

Along with Autoroute 15 to Sainte-Agathe-des-Monts, it is also listed as a branch of the Trans-Canada Highway. Ontario Highway 17 is also a branch of the Trans-Canada Highway but is an unrelated route that parallels it by about 200 km (120 mi).

== Route description ==
This description of Route 117 follows it from southeast to northwest.

Route 117 starts in Montreal at the Décarie Interchange where Autoroute 40 and Autoroute 15 (Décarie Expressway) meet. Montrealers sometimes unofficially extend Route 117 along the portion of Décarie Boulevard that runs parallel to the Décarie Expressway.

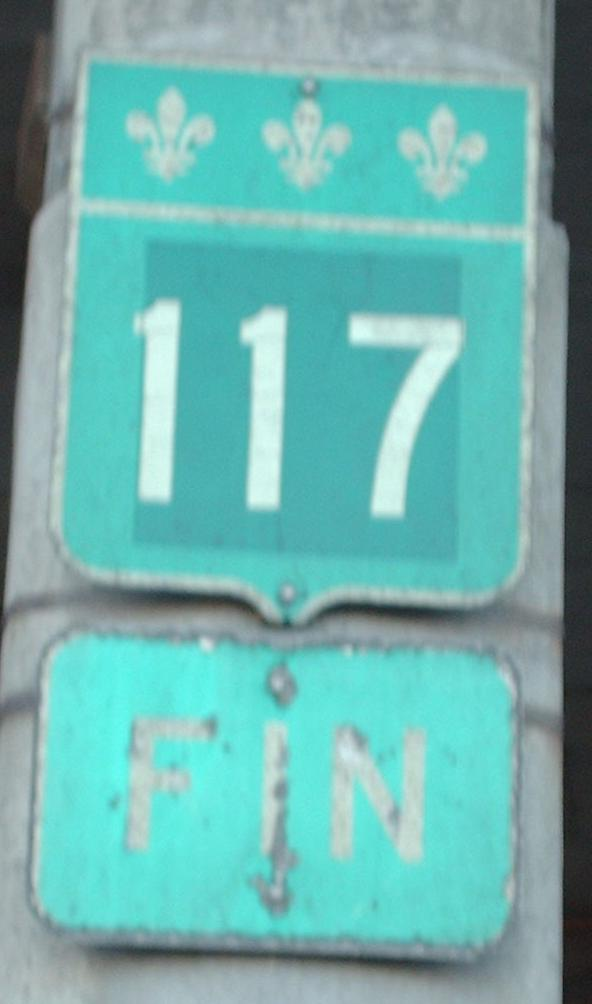
117 Fin/End sign at the end of Marcel Laurin Blvd. in Montreal, Quebec

From the Décarie Interchange, Route 117 goes north on Marcel-Laurin Boulevard to Keller Boulevard. It continues from Laurentian Boulevard to Keller Boulevard, southbound only, or on Lachapelle Street from Keller Boulevard, northbound only, and crosses the Rivière des Prairies over the Lachapelle Bridge to Île Jésus. It continues through the Laval neighborhoods of Chomedey, Fabreville and Sainte-Rose, northbound as Boulevard Curé-Labelle, Boulevard Chomedey at the former Chenoy's deli, left turn at Boulevard Cartier and back into Boulevard Curé-Labelle, southbound as Boulevard Curé-Labelle.

At the Rivière des Mille Îles, it crosses over the Marius Dufresne Bridge to the "North Shore" (of the Rivière des Mille Îles). Then, Route 117 runs parallel to Autoroute 15 until Sainte-Agathe-des-Monts and goes through the Laurentian Mountains. Towns along the route in this section include:

- Rosemère
- Sainte-Thérèse
- Blainville
- Mirabel
- Saint-Jérôme
- Prévost
- Sainte-Anne-des-Lacs
- Piedmont
- Sainte-Adèle
- Val-Morin
- Val-David
- Sainte-Agathe-des-Monts

After Sainte-Agathe-des-Monts, Route 117 continues as a four-lane divided highway and winds its way through Laurentides Regional County Municipality until it reaches the town of Labelle. From then on to the Ontario border, Route 117 is mostly a standard two-lane highway. In Grand-Remous, Route 117 crosses the Gatineau River and intersects with Route 105, which goes southwest to Maniwaki and Gatineau. Towns along the route in this section include:

- Ivry-sur-le-Lac
- Mont-Blanc
- Mont-Tremblant
- La Conception
- Labelle
- Rivière-Rouge
- Nominingue
- Lac-Saguay
- Lac-des-Écorces
- Mont-Laurier
- Aumond
- Grand-Remous

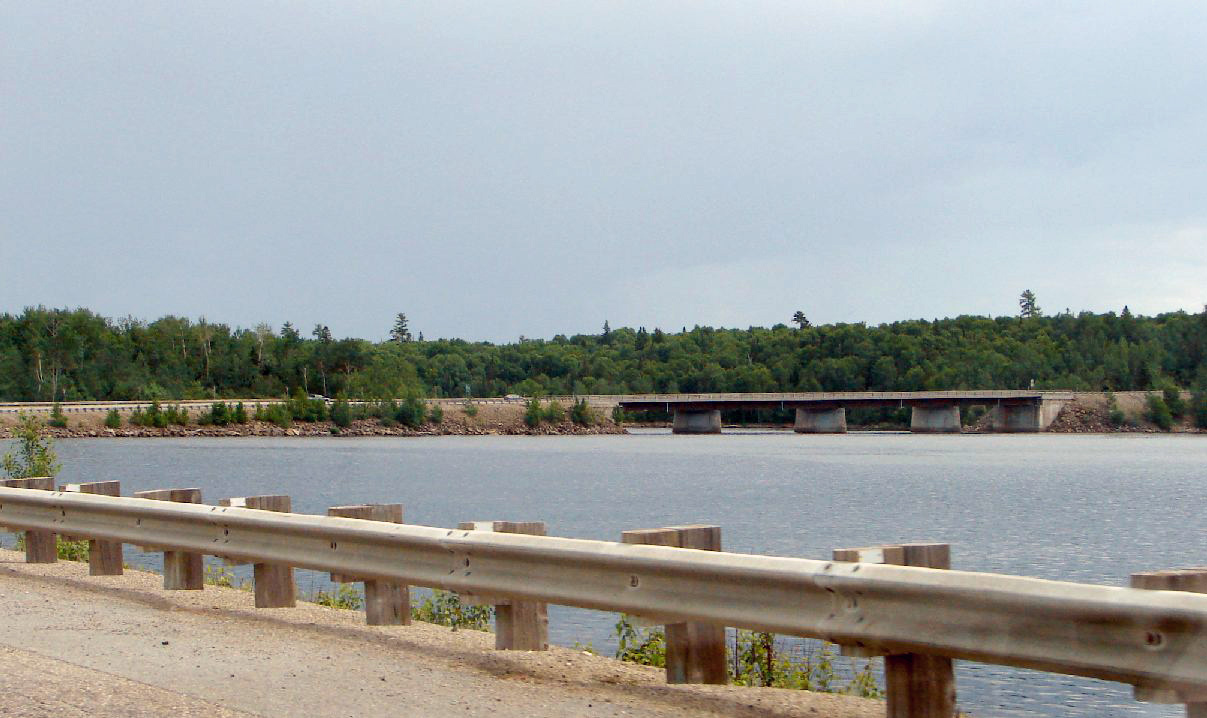
Highway 117 at the Dozois Reservoir

From Grand-Remous, the route heads north for some 220 km (140 mi) through undeveloped wilderness, most of which is part of La Vérendrye Wildlife Reserve. While the reserve is popular for a variety of outdoor activities, services along the road are sparse. This section is often considered one of the most dangerous routes in the province because of numerous fatal accidents, some involving tractor-trailers. During the winter, the route is often extremely slippery, even during dry and clear days. The few communities along this section are:

- Montcerf-Lytton
- Cascades-Malignes
- Lac-Pythonga
- Réservoir-Dozois
- Matchi-Manitou
- Val-d'Or
- Lac-Simon

After the intersection with Route 113, which continues north to Lebel-sur-Quévillon, Route 117 heads west to Ontario where it becomes Highway 66. The section between Rouyn-Noranda and Arntfield runs concurrent with Route 101. Towns along the route in this section include:

- Val-d'Or
- Malartic
- Rivière-Héva
- Rouyn-Noranda

== In other media ==
The rivalry in the Quebec Maritimes Junior Hockey League between the Val-d'Or Foreurs and the Rouyn-Noranda Huskies, the only two QMJHL teams in the Abitibi-Témiscamingue region, is known as La Guerre de la 117 (French for "The War of the 117") due to both teams' home cities, Val-d'Or and Rouyn-Noranda, being located along Route 117.

== Major intersections ==
RCM	Location	km	mi	Exit	Destinations	Notes
Montréal	Montréal	0.0	0.0		A-15 (Autoroute Décarie) / A-40 (TCH) (Autoroute Félix-Leclerc / Autoroute Métropolitaine) to A-520 – P.-E.-Trudeau International Airport, Ottawa/Gatineau, Laval, Quebec	Décarie Interchange; A-15 exit 70; A-40 exit 66; R-117 follows Boulevard Marcel-Laurin
Montréal	Montréal	0.0	0.0		Boulevard Décarie	Northbound exit and southbound entrance
Montréal	Montréal	2.0	1.2		Boulevard Côte-Vertu	
Montréal	Montréal	4.1	2.5		Boulevard Henri Bourassa	Becomes Boulevard Laurentien north of intersection
Montréal	Montréal	4.6	2.9		Boulevard Keller	South end of one-way pair; northbound follows Rue Lachapelle; southbound follows Boulevard Laurentien
Montréal	Montréal	5.6	3.5		Boulevard Gouin	
Montréal	Montréal	5.9	3.7		One way transition	North end of one-way pair
Rivière des Prairies		6.0– 6.3	3.7– 3.9	Pont Lachapelle (Lachapelle Bridge)		
Laval		7.0	4.3		Chomedey Boulevard / Cartier Boulevard	
Laval		9.8	6.1		Boulevard Saint-Martin	Former R-148
Laval		11.7	7.3		A-440 (Autoroute Jean-Noël-Lavoie)	A-440 exit 19
Laval		14.5	9.0		A-15 (TCH) (Autoroute des Laurentides) – Saint-Jérôme, Montréal	A-15 exit 14
Rivière des Mille Îles		17.6– 18.1	10.9– 11.2	Pont Marius-Dufresne (Marius Dufresne Bridge)		
Thérèse-De Blainville	Rosemère	19.1	11.9		R-344 (Chemin de la Grande-Côte)	
Thérèse-De Blainville	Rosemère – Sainte-Thérèse boundary	20.8	12.9		A-640 – Repentigny, Saint-Eustache	A-640 exit 22
Mirabel		35.6	22.1		A-50 west to A-15 – Mirabel International Airport, Lachute, Gatineau	A-50 eastern terminus; at-grade
La Rivière-du-Nord	Saint-Jérôme	40.5	25.2		R-158 (Boulevard Lachapelle) to A-15	
La Rivière-du-Nord	Saint-Jérôme	46.0	28.6		R-333 north (Boulevard des Hauteurs) – Saint-Hippolyte	R-333 southern terminus
La Rivière-du-Nord	Saint-Jérôme	46.5	28.9	46	To A-15 – Montreal	Interchange; R-117 south uses exit 46
Les Pays-d'en-Haut	Sainte-Anne-des-Lacs	57.9	36.0		To A-15 / Chemin de Sainte-Anne-des-Lacs – Sainte-Anne-des-Lacs	A-15 exit 57
Les Pays-d'en-Haut	Sainte-Adèle	63.8	39.6		To A-15 / Chemin du Mont-Gabriel	A-15 exit 64
Les Pays-d'en-Haut	Sainte-Adèle	65.9– 66.8	40.9– 41.5		A-15 (TCH) south – Montreal	Northbound entrance and southbound exit; northbound exit and southbound entrance from A-15; A-15 exit 67
Les Pays-d'en-Haut	Sainte-Adèle	68.2	42.4		R-370 east (Chemin Pierre-Péladeau) to A-15 north / Rue Morin	R-370 western terminus
Les Pays-d'en-Haut	Sainte-Adèle	70.1	43.6		A-15 (TCH) south – Montreal	Entrance only to A-15 south
Les Laurentides	Val-Morin	75.5	46.9		A-15 (TCH) south – Montreal	No northbound exit; northbound exit and southbound entrance from A-15; A-15 exit 76
Les Laurentides	Sainte-Agathe-des-Monts	85.1– 85.3	52.9– 53.0		A-15 (TCH) / Chemin de la Montagne / Chemin de la Rivière – Montreal, Mont Tremblant	A-15 exit 86
Les Laurentides	Sainte-Agathe-des-Monts	86.2	53.6		R-329 south (Rue Principale) / Rue Desjardins / Rue Raymond – Centre-Ville, Saint-Adolphe-d'Howard	Roundabout; south end of R-329 concurrency
Les Laurentides	Sainte-Agathe-des-Monts	88.3– 88.9	54.9– 55.2	89	A-15 (TCH) south / R-329 north – Saint-Donat, Sainte-Adèle, Montreal	A-15 northern terminus; north end of R-329 concurrency; south end of Trans-Canada Highway; R-117 south uses exit 89
Les Laurentides	Mont-Blanc	107.1	66.5	107	Rue Principale	Interchange
Les Laurentides	Mont-Tremblant	113.6	70.6		Rue Siméon – Centre-Ville	Roundabout
Les Laurentides	Mont-Tremblant	114.7	71.3		Rue Vaillancourt – Centre-Ville	Roundabout
Les Laurentides	Mont-Tremblant	116.3	72.3	116	R-327 (Rue Léonard) – Huberdeau, Lachute	Interchange
Les Laurentides	Mont-Tremblant	117.1– 117.9	72.8– 73.3	117	R-323 south (Chemin de Brébeuf) – Montebello, Brébeuf	Interchange; R-323 northern terminus
Les Laurentides	Mont-Tremblant	130.0– 131.1	80.8– 81.5	119	Montée Ryan	Interchange
Les Laurentides	La Conception	126.3	78.5	126	Route des Tulipes	Interchange
Les Laurentides	Labelle	139.7	86.8	140	Boulevard du Curé-Labelle	Interchange
Les Laurentides	Labelle	142.4	88.5	143	Chemin Augustin-Lauzon	Interchange
Les Laurentides	Labelle	144.8	90.0	145	Boulevard du Curé-Labelle	Northbound exit and entrance
Les Laurentides	Labelle	146.0	90.7		Chemin de La Minerve / Boulevard du Curé-Labelle	
Antoine-Labelle	Rivière-Rouge	160.0	99.4		Chemin Deslauriers / Rue L'Annonciation Sud	Roundabout
Antoine-Labelle	Rivière-Rouge	162.1	100.7	162	La Macaza – Mont Tremblant International Airport, Rivière-Rouge Centre-Ville, La Macaza	Interchange
Antoine-Labelle	Rivière-Rouge	162.1	100.7		R-321 – Nominingue, L'Ascension	Roundabout
Antoine-Labelle	Lac-des-Écorces	209.8	130.4		R-311 north – Chute-Saint-Philippe, Mont-Saint-Michel	South end of R-311 concurrency
Antoine-Labelle	Lac-des-Écorces	210.2	130.6		R-311 south – Val-Barrette, Kiamika	North end of R-311 concurrency
Antoine-Labelle	Mont-Laurier	222.9	138.5		R-309 – Gatineau, Ferme-Neuve	
Antoine-Labelle	Mont-Laurier	240.0	149.1		R-107 south – Aumond	R-107 northern terminus
La Vallée-de-la-Gatineau	Grand-Remous	257.3	159.9		R-105 south – Maniwaki, Gatineau	R-105 northern terminus
La Vallée-de-l'Or	Val-d'Or	479.8	298.1		R-113 north – Senneterre, Lebel-sur-Quévillon	R-113 southern terminus
La Vallée-de-l'Or	Val-d'Or	508.3	315.8		3e Avenue / Rue Saint-Jacques – Centre-Ville	Roundabout
La Vallée-de-l'Or	Val-d'Or	510.7	317.3		R-397 north (Boulevard Jean-Jacques-Cossette) – Centre-Ville, Barraute	Roundabout; R-397 southern terminus
La Vallée-de-l'Or	Val-d'Or	511.7	318.0		Rue de l'Hydro	Roundabout
La Vallée-de-l'Or	Val-d'Or	513.6	319.1		R-111 north / Chemin Sullivan – La Sarre	Roundabout; R-111 southern terminus
La Vallée-de-l'Or	Val-d'Or	516.5	320.9		3e Avenue / Boulevard Barrette	Roundabout
La Vallée-de-l'Or	Malartic	540.3	335.7		Rue de l'Accueil / Chemin du Camping-Régional	Roundabout
La Vallée-de-l'Or	Rivière-Héva	555.4	345.1		R-109 north – Amos	R-109 southern terminus
Rouyn-Noranda		572.5	355.7		R-395 north – Preissac	R-395 southern terminus
Rouyn-Noranda		614.5	381.8		Avenue Larivière – Rouyn-Noranda Centre-Ville	Roundabout; former R-117 alignment
Rouyn-Noranda		622.1	386.6		R-101 north – D'Alembert, D'Alembert	Roundabout; south end of R-101 concurrency
Rouyn-Noranda		625.6	388.7		Boulevard Rideaux – Rouyn-Noranda Centre-Ville	Former R-117 alignment
Rouyn-Noranda		627.2	389.7		Avenue Davy / Rue Mantha	Roundabout
Rouyn-Noranda		644.5	400.5		R-101 south – Ville-Marie	North end of R-101 concurrency
Rouyn-Noranda		663.9	412.5		Highway 66 west / TCH – Kirkland Lake	Continuation into Ontario
1.000 mi = 1.609 km; 1.000 km = 0.621 mi: Concurrency terminus; Incomplete access; Route transition; Unopened

== See also ==
- List of Quebec provincial highways
- Golden Highway (Ontario)

Trans-Canada Highway
Previous route ON Highway 66	Route 117	Next route Autoroute 40
