= Quebec Route 109 =

Highway in Quebec, Canada

Route 109

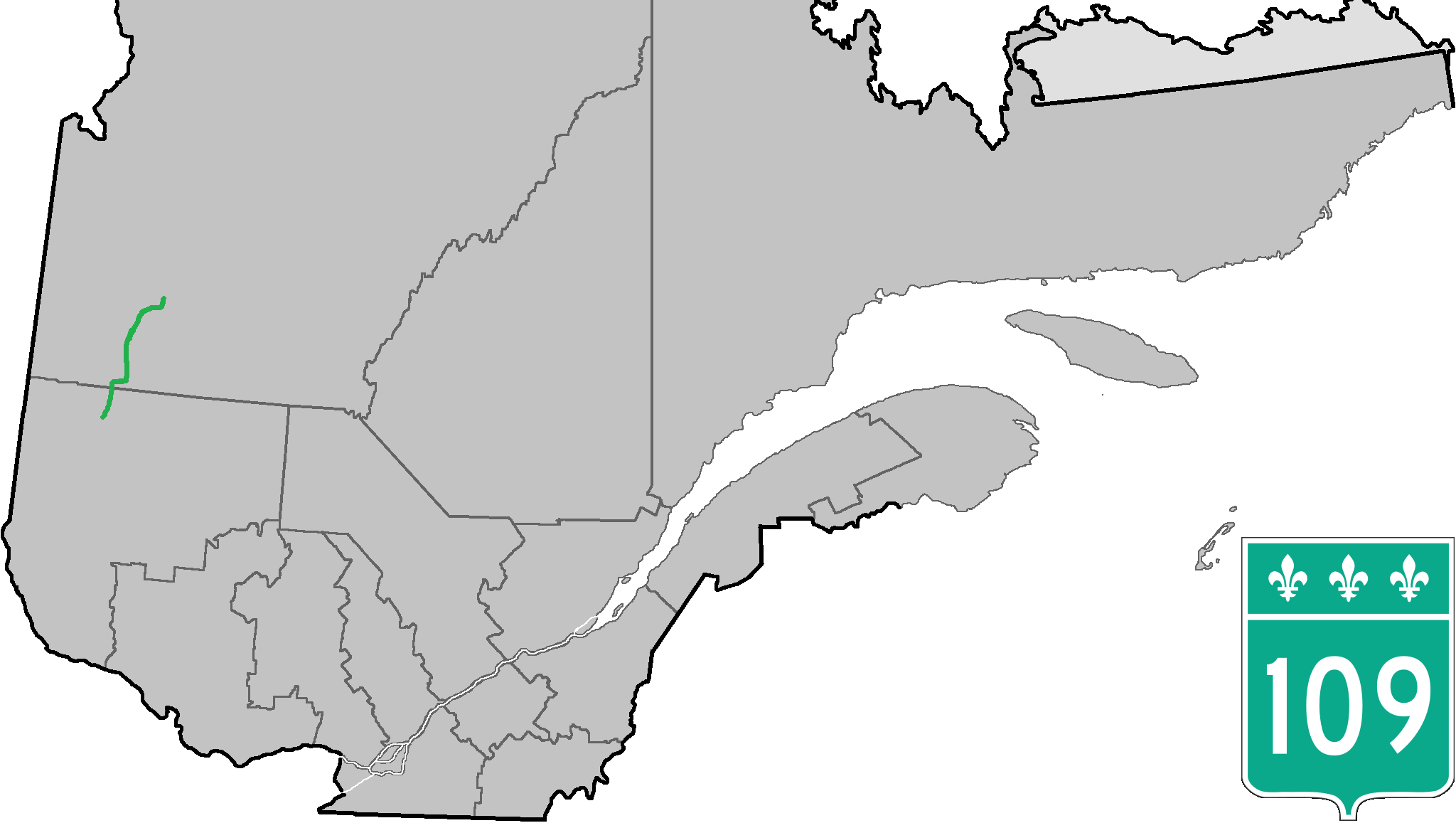

Route information
- Maintained by Transports Québec
- Length: 222.7 km (138.4 mi)

Major junctions
- South end: R-117 (TCH) in Rivière-Héva
- R-111 / R-395 in Amos
- North end: James Bay Road in Matagami

Location
- Country: Canada
- Province: Quebec
- Major cities: Amos, Eeyou-Istchee-Baie-James, Matagami

Highway system
- Quebec provincial highways; Autoroutes; List; Former
← R-108	→ R-111

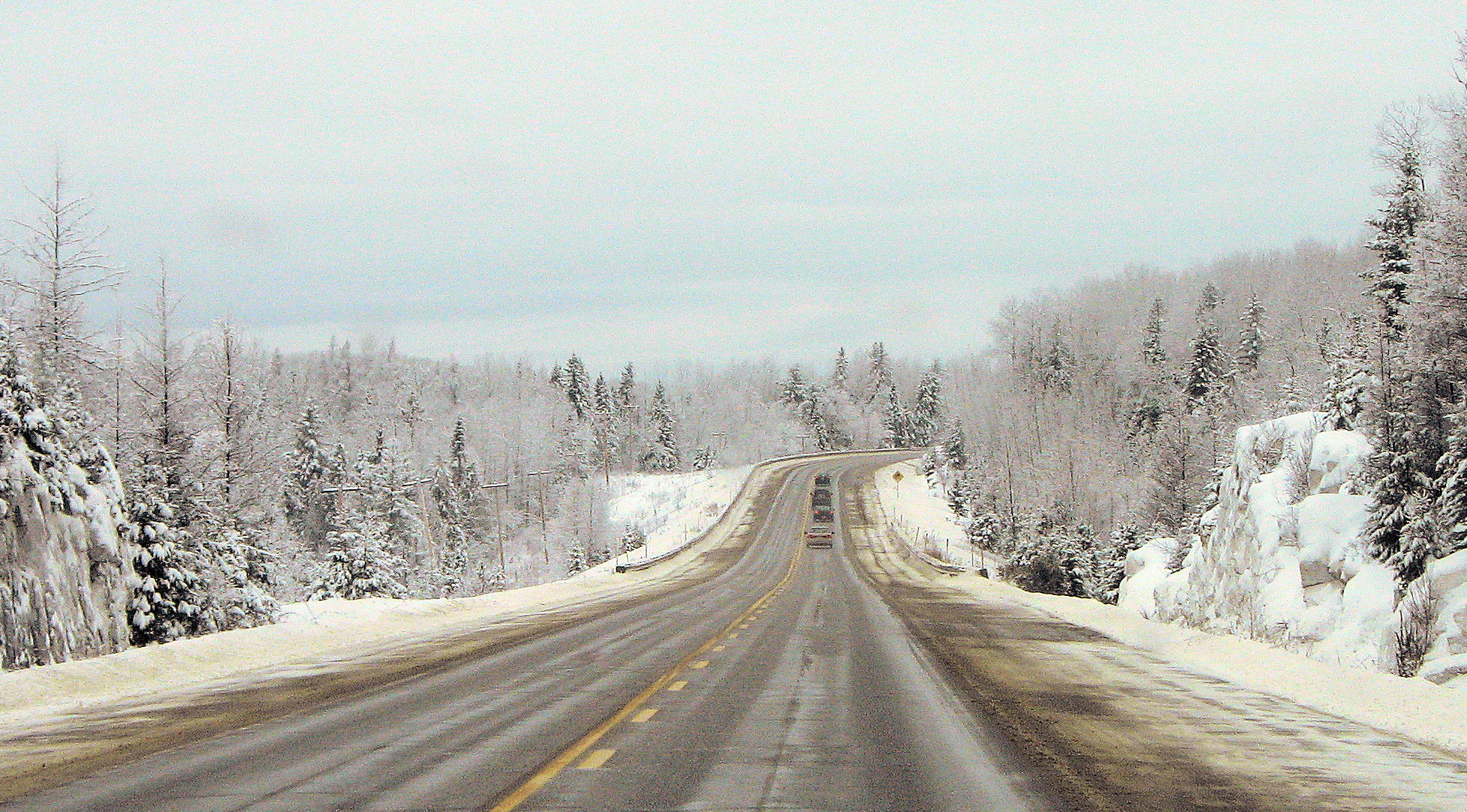
Typical winter scenery of Route 109 between Saint-Dominique-du-Rosaire and Matagami

Route 109 is a Quebec provincial highway that runs through the western regions of Abitibi-Témiscamingue and Nord-du-Québec. It begins at Route 117 in Rivière-Héva, proceeding north approximately 59 km (36.7 mi) to Amos. From there, the highway extends 182 km (113.1 mi) to Matagami, where the road continues northwards as James Bay Road (French: Route de la Baie James). It is now classified as a municipal road, but the James Bay Road was part of Route 109 until 2002. Consequently, some maps may still identify it as such.

The 182 km section of Route 109 between Saint-Dominique-du-Rosaire and Matagami winds through complete wilderness. No services exist at all there, but extensive logging takes place along the section.

== Municipalities along Route 109 ==
- Rivière-Héva
- La Motte
- Saint-Mathieu-d'Harricana
- Amos
- Pikogan
- Saint-Dominique-du-Rosaire
- Eeyou-Istchee-Baie-James
- Matagami

== Major intersections ==
RCM or ET	Municipality	km	Junction	Notes
Southern terminus of Route 109
Abitibi	Rivière-Héva	0.0	R-117 (TCH)	117 SOUTH: to Val-d'Or; 117 NORTH: to Rouyn-Noranda
Abitibi	Amos	39.3	R-111	111 SOUTH: to Val-d'Or
Abitibi	Amos	39.3	R-395	395 SOUTH: to Preissac; 395 NORTH: to La Morandière-Rochebaucourt
Abitibi	Amos	40.6	R-111	111 NORTH: to La Sarre
Jamésie	Matagami	222.7	R-109	James Bay Road
Northern terminus of Route 109

== See also ==
- List of Quebec provincial highways
