= Abitibi-Ouest Regional County Municipality =

Abitibi-Ouest
- Regional county municipality
- Coordinates: 48°45′N 79°10′W
- Country: Canada
- Province: Quebec
- Region: Abitibi-Témiscamingue
- Effective: January 1, 1982
- County seat: La Sarre

Government
  - Type: Prefecture
  - Prefect: Daniel Rancourt

Area
  - Total: 3,563.10 km^{2} (1,375.72 sq mi)
  - Land: 3,334.92 km^{2} (1,287.62 sq mi)

Population (2016)
  - Total: 20,538
  - Density: 6.2/km^{2} (16/sq mi)
  - Change 2011-2016: ▼2.2%
  - Dwellings: 10,053
- Time zone: UTC−5 (EST)
  - Summer (DST): UTC−4 (EDT)
- Area code: 819
- Website: www.mrc.ao.ca

Abitibi-Ouest Regional County Municipality (French pronunciation: [abitibi wɛst], Abitibi West) is a regional county municipality located in the Abitibi-Témiscamingue region of Quebec. Its seat is La Sarre.

== Subdivisions ==
There are 23 subdivisions within the RCM:

Cities & Towns (3)

- Duparquet
- La Sarre
- Macamic

Municipalities (15)

- Authier
- Authier-Nord
- Chazel
- Clerval
- Dupuy
- Gallichan
- La Reine
- Normétal
- Palmarolle
- Poularies
- Rapide-Danseur
- Roquemaure
- Sainte-Germaine-Boulé
- Taschereau
- Val-Saint-Gilles

Parishes (2)

- Sainte-Hélène-de-
  Mancebourg
- Saint-Lambert

Townships (1)

- Clermont

Unorganized Territory (2)

- Lac-Duparquet
- Rivière-Ojima

== Demographics ==
=== Population ===
Canada census – Abitibi-Ouest community profile

	2021	2016	2011
Population	20,526 (-0.1% from 2016)	20,538 (-2.2% from 2011)	21,003 (+1.0% from 2006)
Land area	3,312.45 km^{2} (1,278.94 sq mi)	3,334.92 km^{2} (1,287.62 sq mi)	3,337.51 km^{2} (1,288.62 sq mi)
Population density	6.2/km^{2} (16/sq mi)	6.2/km^{2} (16/sq mi)	6.3/km^{2} (16/sq mi)
Median age	46.8 (M: 46.4, F: 48.0)	46.4 (M: 45.6, F: 47.3)	45.5 (M: 45.0, F: 45.9)
Private dwellings	10,082 (total) 9,233 (occupied)	10,053 (total)	9,698 (total)
Median household income	$67,500	$57,116	$48,589

References: 2021 2016 2011

Historical Census Data - Abitibi-Ouest Regional County Municipality, Quebec

Year	Pop.	±%
1991	24,109	—
1996	23,571	−2.2%
2001	21,984	−6.7%

Year	Pop.	±%
2006	20,792	−5.4%
2011	21,003	+1.0%
2016	20,538	−2.2%

=== Language ===
Canada Census Mother Tongue - Abitibi-Ouest Regional County Municipality
Census	Total	French			English			French & English			Other		
Year	Responses	Count	Trend	Pop %	Count	Trend	Pop %	Count	Trend	Pop %	Count	Trend	Pop %
2016	20,360	20,515	▼2.1%	98.62%	120	▼7.7%	0.63%	75	▲50.0%	0.37%	85	▼5.6%	0.42%
2011	20,785	20,515	▲1.7%	98.70%	130	▲8.3%	0.63%	50	▲11.1%	0.24%	90	▼30.8%	0.43%
2006	20,460	20,165	▼6.0%	98.56%	120	▲84.6%	0.59%	45	▼43.8%	0.22%	130	▲18.2%	0.63%
2001	21,695	21,440	▼7.1%	98.82%	65	▼18.8%	0.30%	80	▲45.5%	0.37%	110	▲266.7%	0.51%
1996	23,235	23,070	n/a	99.29%	80	n/a	0.34%	55	n/a	0.27%	30	n/a	0.13%

== Transportation ==
=== Access Routes ===
Highways and numbered routes that run through the municipality, including external routes that start or finish at the county border:

- Autoroutes
  - None
- Primary Highways
  - R-101
  - R-111
- Secondary Highways
  - R-388
  - R-390
  - R-393
- External Routes
  - Highway 101

== Attractions and other areas ==
- Antoine Marsh (Roquemaure)
- Calamite Covered Bridge [1927] (La Sarre)
- Culture House (La Sarre)
- Interpretation de la foresterie Centre (La Sarre)
- La Salle Airport (Clermont)
- Leclerc Covered Bridge [1927] (La Sarre)
- l'Ile Covered Bridge [1946] (Clerval)
- Joseph Berube Collection (Gallichan)
- Molesworth Covered Bridge [1930] (Macamic Ville)
- Notre-Dame-des-pauvres Sanctuary (Dupuy)
- Petit-Quatre Covered Bridge [1950] (Clermont)
- Rang 11 School (Authier)
- Rapide-Danseur Church (1942) (Rapide Danseur)
- Sang-Neuf-Art Gallery (Palmarolle)

== Protected areas ==
Aiguebelle National Park

== See also ==
- List of regional county municipalities and equivalent territories in Quebec
