= Abitibi-Ouest =

Abitibi-Ouest may refer to:

- Abitibi-Ouest (electoral district)
- Abitibi-Ouest Regional County Municipality, Quebec
