= Palmarolle =

- Municipality
- Palmarolle in 2026

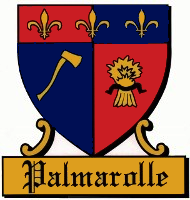
- Coat of arms

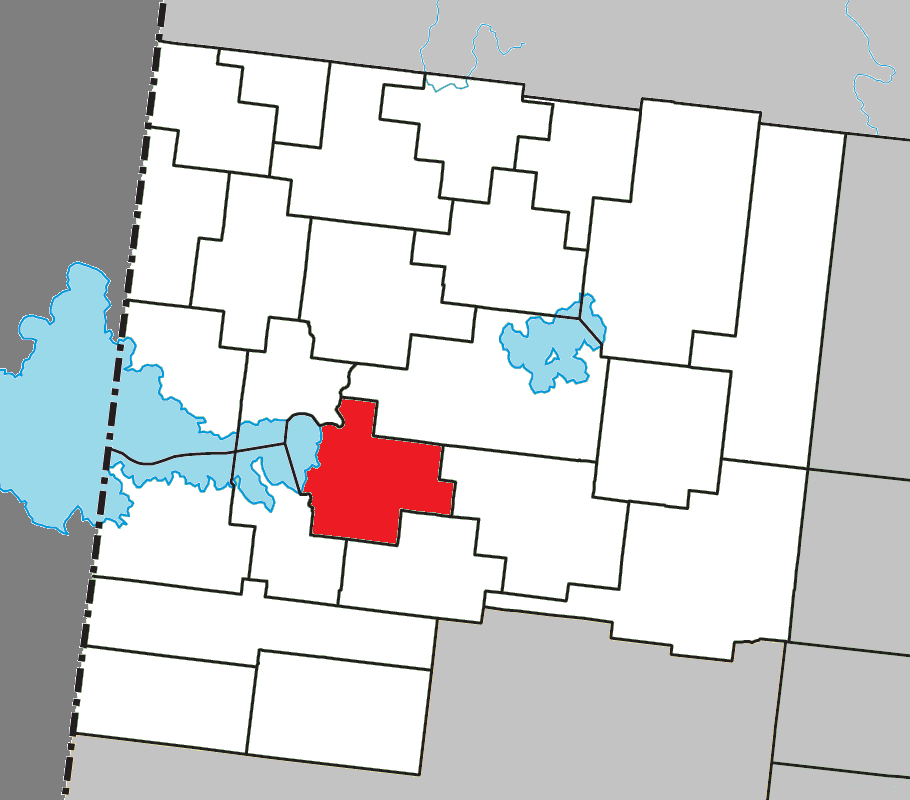
- Location within Abitibi-Ouest RCM

- Location in western Quebec
- Coordinates: 48°40′N 79°12′W
- Country: Canada
- Province: Quebec
- Region: Abitibi-Témiscamingue
- RCM: Abitibi-Ouest
- Settled: 1911
- Constituted: April 14, 1930

Government
  - Mayor: Véronique Aubin
  - Federal riding: Abitibi—Témiscamingue
  - Prov. riding: Abitibi-Ouest

Area
  - Total: 135.37 km^{2} (52.27 sq mi)
  - Land: 117.87 km^{2} (45.51 sq mi)

Population (2021)
  - Total: 1,386
  - Density: 11.8/km^{2} (31/sq mi)
  - Pop (2016-21): ▼1.6%
  - Dwellings: 649
- Time zone: UTC−5 (EST)
  - Summer (DST): UTC−4 (EDT)
- Postal code(s): J0Z 3C0
- Area code: 819
- Highways: R-390 R-393
- Website: palmarolle.ao.ca

Palmarolle (French pronunciation: [palmaʁɔl]) is a municipality in northwestern Quebec, Canada, in the Abitibi-Ouest Regional County Municipality. It covers 117.87 km^{2} and had a population of 1,386 as of the Canada 2021 Census. It is considered to have the best agricultural land of the entire Abitibi region.

== History ==
The area began to be colonized in 1911 when the township was surveyed. The completion of the National Transcontinental Railway at La Sarre and Macamic led to further waves of development with the arrival of new settlers in 1916, 1918, and 1929. Following the pattern of other places in the Abitibi, the settlement was named after a historic military figure, François-Charles Bertrand de Palmarole or Palmarolle (1714 ‑ 1760), lieutenant of the La Sarre Regiment and Knight of the Order of Saint Louis. In 1921, the parish was formed and in 1930, the place was incorporated as a municipality.

== Demographics ==
=== Population ===
Canada census – Palmarolle community profile

	2021	2016	2011
Population	1,386 (-1.6% from 2016)	1,409 (-3.8% from 2011)	1,465 (+0.8% from 2006)
Land area	117.87 km^{2} (45.51 sq mi)	117.98 km^{2} (45.55 sq mi)	117.40 km^{2} (45.33 sq mi)
Population density	11.8/km^{2} (31/sq mi)	11.9/km^{2} (31/sq mi)	12.5/km^{2} (32/sq mi)
Median age	43.6 (M: 43.6, F: 44)	44.9 (M: 43.6, F: 45.8)	42.9 (M: 42.6, F: 43.4)
Private dwellings	649 (total)	647 (total)	642 (total)
Median household income	$78,000	$68,992	$63,562

References: 2021 2016 2011

Historical census populations – Palmarolle

Year	Pop.	±%
1931	699	—
1941	2,063	+195.1%
1951	2,439	+18.2%
1956	1,875	−23.1%
1961	1,360	−27.5%
1966	1,481	+8.9%

Year	Pop.	±%
1971	1,325	−10.5%
1976	1,296	−2.2%
1981	1,445	+11.5%
1986	1,457	+0.8%
1991	1,571	+7.8%
1996	1,561	−0.6%

Year	Pop.	±%
2001	1,527	−2.2%
2006	1,453	−4.8%
2011	1,465	+0.8%
2016	1,409	−3.8%
2021	1,386	−1.6%

Source: Statistics Canada

Private dwellings occupied by usual residents (2021): 595 (total dwellings: 649)

Mother tongue (2021):

- English as first language: 0.4%
- French as first language: 98.6%
- English and French as first language: 0.4%
- Other as first language: 0.7%

== Government ==
Municipal council (2024):

- Mayor: Véronique Aubin
- Councillors: Josée Aubin, Nicole Hébert-Trottier, Lyne Vachon, Jeanot Goulet, Sabrina Turgeon

List of former mayors:

- Amédée Rodrigue (1930–1934)
- Omer Tousignant (1934–1936)
- Aldephonse Dallaire (1937–1943)
- Robert Pelletier (1943–1945)
- Stanislas Pelletier (1945–1951)
- Emilien Bégin (1951–1964)
- Pierre Aubin (1964–1973)
- Marcel Caron (1973–1997, 2009–2017)
- Pierre Vachon (1997–2009)
- Louisa Gobeil (2017–2020)
- Aline Bégin (interim, 2020–2021)
- Véronique Aubin (2021–present)

== Notable people ==
- Henri Tousignant (born August 20, 1937), a Liberal party member of the Canadian House of Commons
- Rogatien Vachon (born September 8, 1945), a professional ice hockey goaltender who played in the National Hockey League and is a member of the Hockey Hall of Fame.
