= Quebec Route 395 =

Highway in Quebec, Canada

Route 395

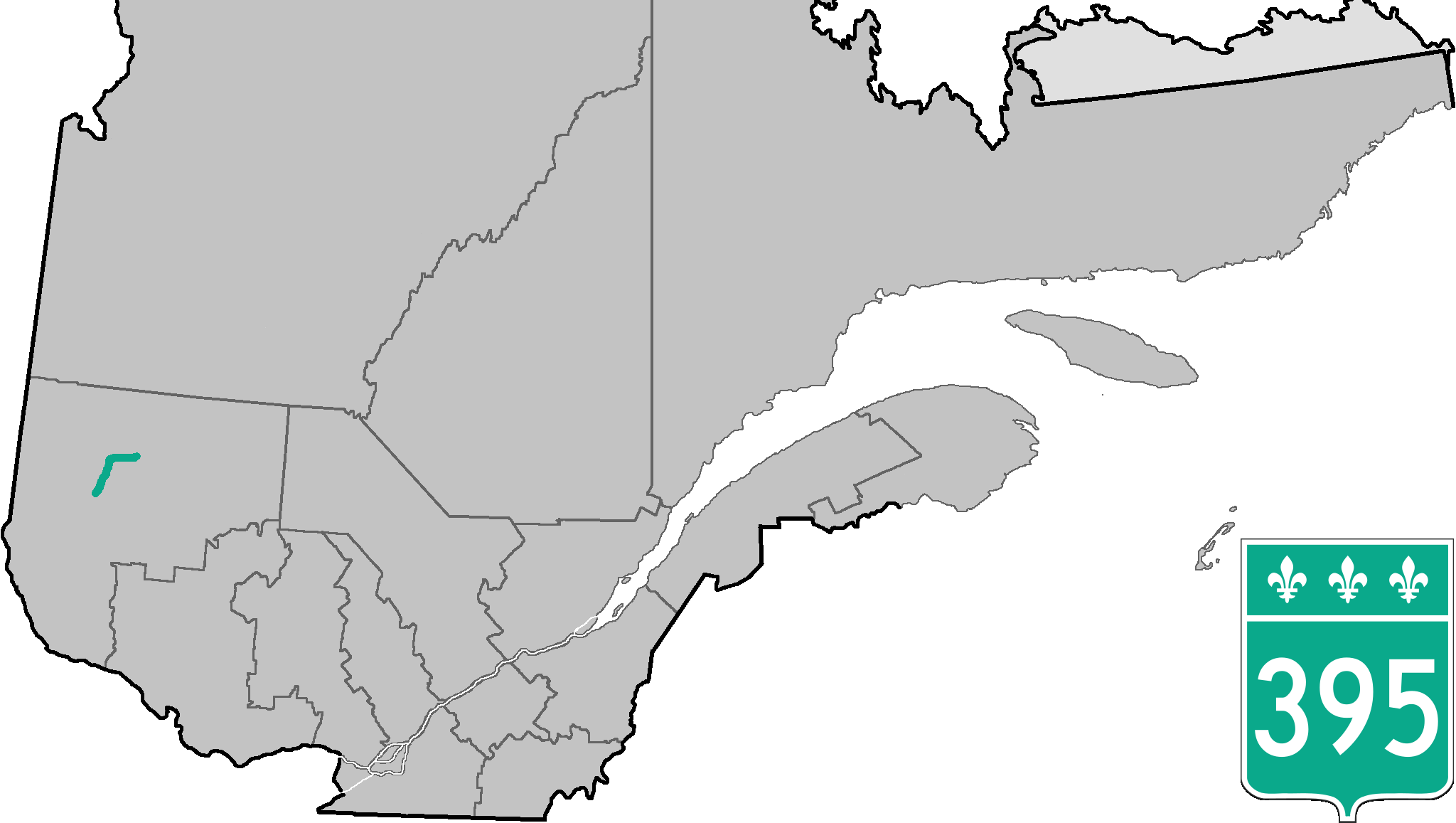

Route information
- Maintained by Transports Québec
- Length: 109 km (68 mi)

Major junctions
- South end: R-117 (TCH) in Rouyn-Noranda
- R-109 / R-111 in Amos
- North end: R-397 in La Morandière-Rochebaucourt

Location
- Country: Canada
- Province: Quebec
- Major cities: Amos, Rouyn-Noranda

Highway system
- Quebec provincial highways; Autoroutes; List; Former
← R-393	→ R-397

Route 395 is a two-lane north–south highway located in the Abitibi-Témiscamingue region in Quebec, Canada. It starts at the junction of Route 117 in Cadillac (now part of Rouyn-Noranda) and ends at the junction of Route 397 in La Morandière-Rochebaucourt. It is briefly concurrent with Route 111 in Amos.

== Municipalities along Route 395 ==
- Rouyn-Noranda
- Preissac
- Sainte-Gertrude-Manneville
- Amos
- La Morandière-Rochebaucourt

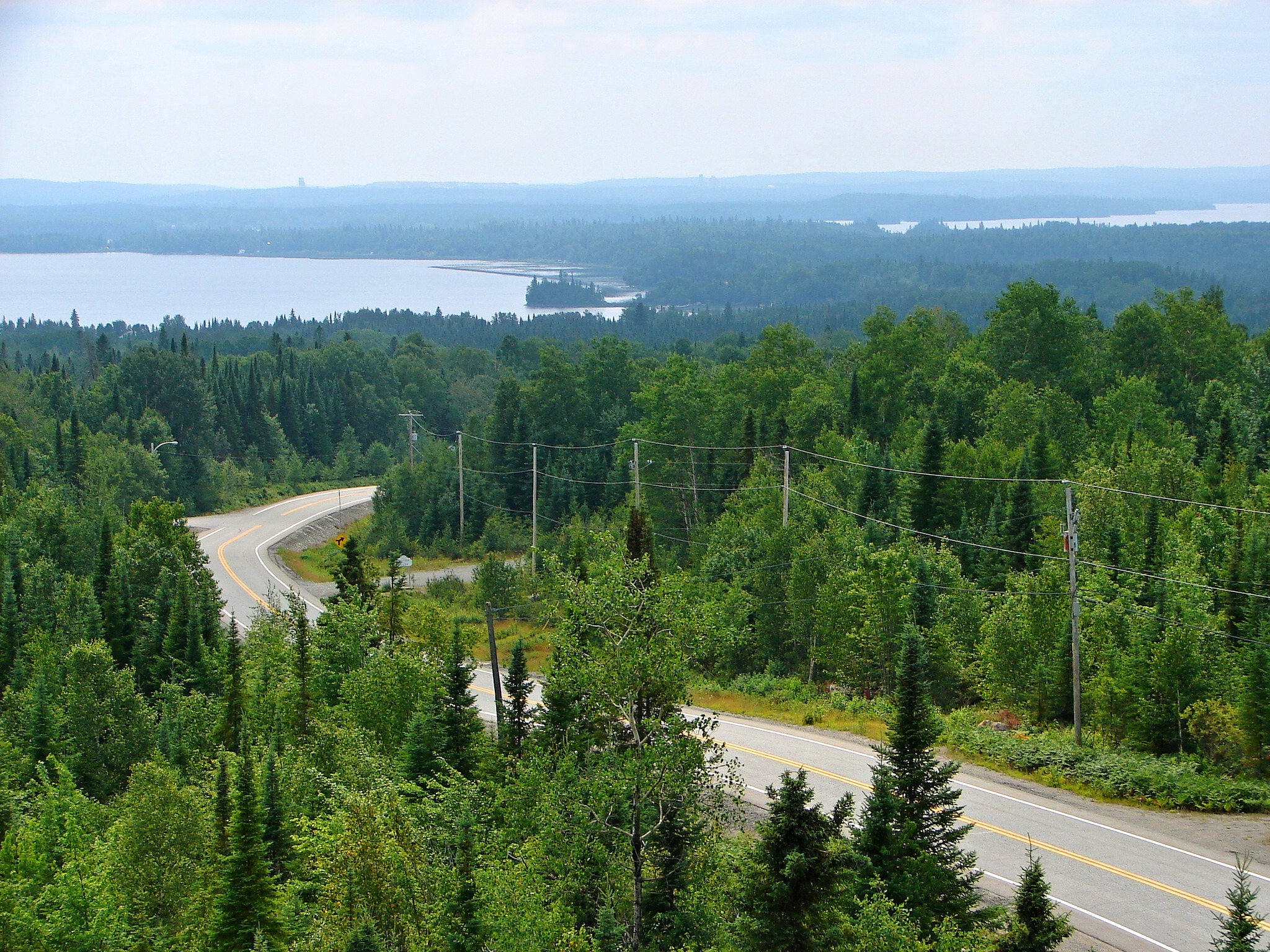
Route 395 just south of Preissac

== See also ==
- List of Quebec provincial highways
