= Taschereau, Quebec =

Taschereau
- Municipality
- Taschereau in 2026

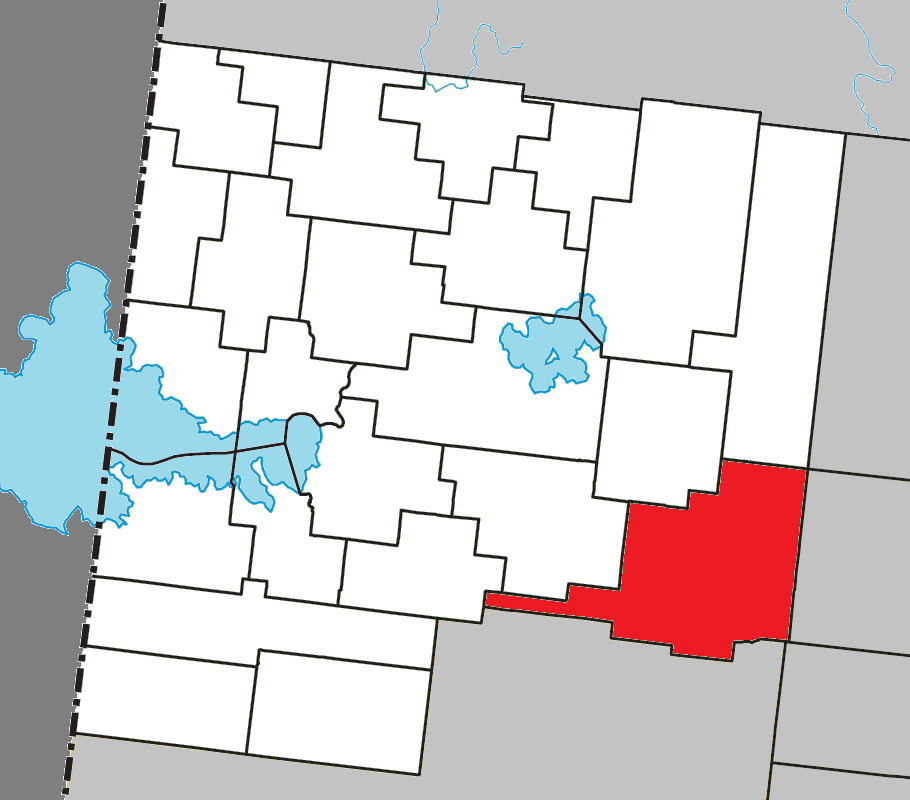
- Location within Abitibi-Ouest RCM

- Location in western Quebec
- Coordinates: 48°40′N 78°41′W
- Country: Canada
- Province: Quebec
- Region: Abitibi-Témiscamingue
- RCM: Abitibi-Ouest
- Settled: 1911
- Constituted: December 27, 2001

Government
  - Mayor: Michael Otis
  - Federal riding: Abitibi—Témiscamingue
  - Prov. riding: Abitibi-Ouest

Area
  - Total: 272.50 km^{2} (105.21 sq mi)
  - Land: 246.96 km^{2} (95.35 sq mi)

Population (2021)
  - Total: 898
  - Density: 3.6/km^{2} (9.3/sq mi)
  - Pop (2016-21): ▼6.7%
  - Dwellings: 460
- Time zone: UTC−5 (EST)
  - Summer (DST): UTC−4 (EDT)
- Postal code(s): J0Z 3N0
- Area code: 819
- Highways: R-101 R-111; R-390
- Website: taschereau.ao.ca

Taschereau (French pronunciation: [taʃʁo]) is a municipality in northwestern Quebec, Canada in the Abitibi-Ouest Regional County Municipality. It covers 246.97 km^{2} and had a population of 898 as of the Canada 2021 Census.

The municipality was incorporated on December 27, 2001, when the Village Municipality of Taschereau and the Municipality of Taschereau were amalgamated. It is named after Louis-Alexandre Taschereau.

== Demographics ==
Historical census populations – Taschereau, Quebec

Year	Pop.	±%
1931	468	—
1941	1,059	+126.3%
1951	890	−16.0%
1956	737	−17.2%
1961	646	−12.3%
1966	732	+13.3%
1971	551	−24.7%
1976	507	−8.0%
1981	541	+6.7%

Year	Pop.	±%
1986	511	−5.5%
1991	476	−6.8%
1996	460	−3.4%
2001	514	+11.7%
2006	996	+93.8%
2011	981	−1.5%
2016	963	−1.8%
2021	898	−6.7%

Between 2001 and 2006, The village of Taschereau was merged with the municipality of Taschereau
Source: Statistics Canada

Private dwellings occupied by usual residents (2021): 425 (total dwellings: 460)

Mother tongue (2021):

- English as first language: 0.6%
- French as first language: 98.9%
- English and French as first language: 0%
- Other as first language: 0.6%

== Government ==
Municipal council (as of 2023):

- Mayor: Michael Otis
- Councillors: Mathieu Cloutier, Zacharie Cloutier-Julien, Henri Lampron, Julien Chalifoux, Patrick Landry, Sylvain Cameron

List of former mayors (since formation of current municipality):

- Jean-Marie Poulin (2001–2009)
- Lucien Côté (2009–2013, 2017–2021)
- Manon Luneau (2013–2017)
- Michaël Otis (2021–present)
