= Quebec Route 390 =

Highway in Quebec, Canada

Route 390

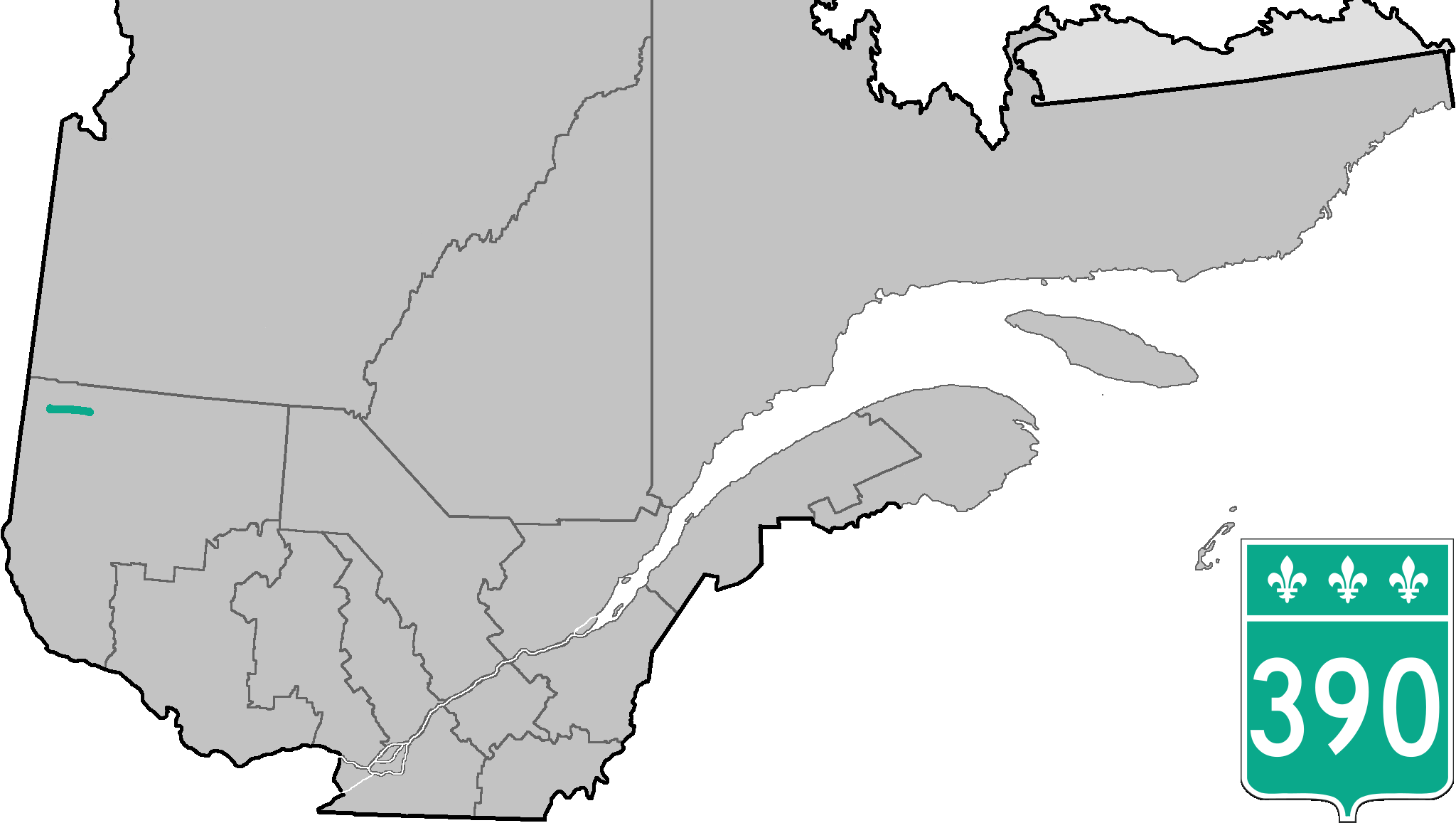

Route information
- Maintained by Transports Québec
- Length: 39 km (24 mi)

Major junctions
- West end: R-393 in Palmarolle
- R-101 in Poularies
- East end: R-111 in Taschereau

Location
- Country: Canada
- Province: Quebec
- Major cities: Taschereau, Poularies, Palmarolle

Highway system
- Quebec provincial highways; Autoroutes; List; Former
← R-389	→ R-391

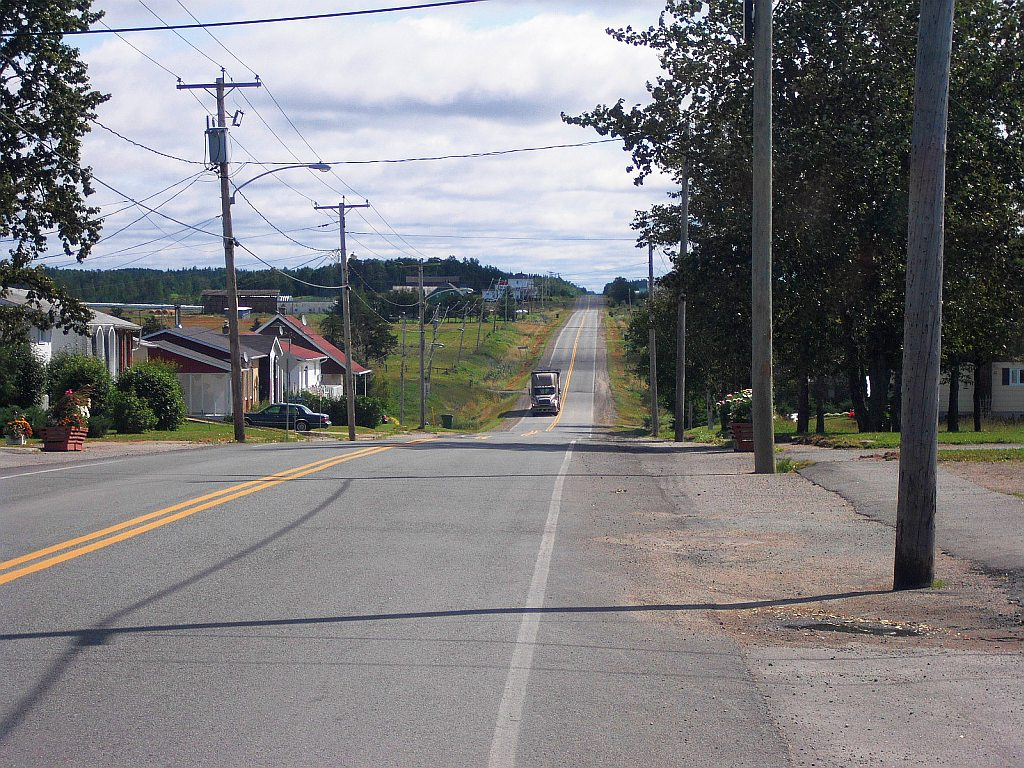
Route 390 at Poularies

Route 390 is a provincial highway located in the Abitibi-Témiscamingue region in southwestern Quebec, Canada. The 40 km (25 mi) highway runs from Palmarolle at the junction of Route 393 and ends in Taschereau at the junction of Route 111. It also intersects with Route 101 in Poularies.

== Towns along Route 390 ==
- Palmarolle
- Poularies
- Taschereau
- Taschereau-Village

== See also ==
- List of Quebec provincial highways
