= Sainte-Gertrude-Manneville =

- Municipality
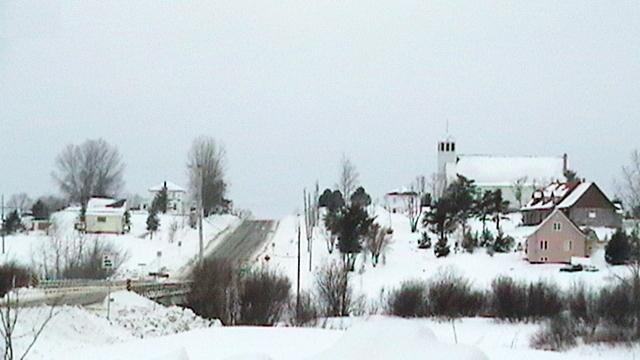
- Sainte-Gertrude-Manneville in winter

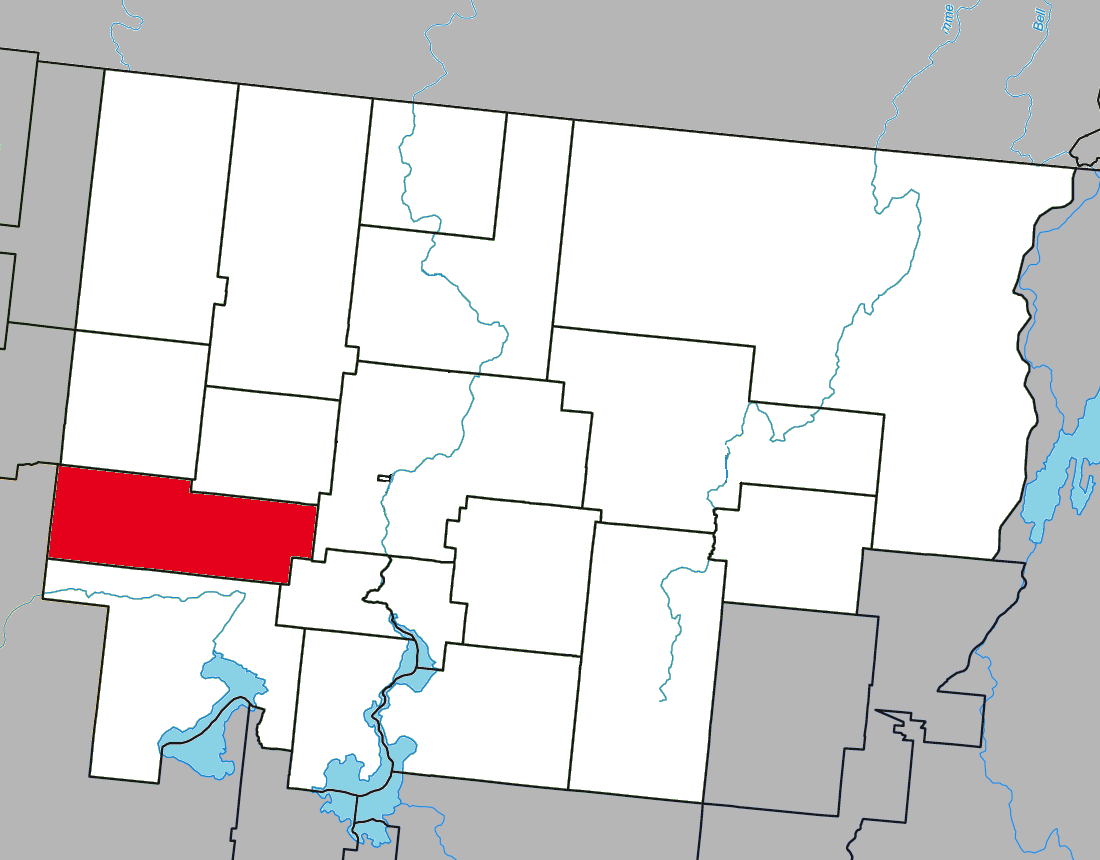
- Location within Abitibi RCM

- Location in western Quebec
- Coordinates: 48°32′N 78°22′W
- Country: Canada
- Province: Quebec
- Region: Abitibi-Témiscamingue
- RCM: Abitibi
- Settled: 1922
- Constituted: January 1, 1980

Government
  - Mayor: Pascal Rheault
  - Federal riding: Abitibi—Témiscamingue
  - Prov. riding: Abitibi-Ouest

Area
  - Total: 320.64 km^{2} (123.80 sq mi)
  - Land: 316.46 km^{2} (122.19 sq mi)

Population (2021)
  - Total: 793
  - Density: 2.5/km^{2} (6.5/sq mi)
  - Pop (2016-21): ▲0.8%
  - Dwellings: 325
- Time zone: UTC−05:00 (EST)
  - Summer (DST): UTC−04:00 (EDT)
- Postal code(s): J0Y 2L0
- Area code: 819
- Highways: R-395
- Website: www.ste-gertrude-manneville.org

Sainte-Gertrude-Manneville (French pronunciation: [sɛ̃t ʒɛʁtʁyd manvil]) is a municipality in the Canadian province of Quebec, located in Abitibi Regional County Municipality. It includes the population centres of Sainte-Gertrude-de-Villeneuve and Manneville.

The municipality had a population of 793 in the 2021 Canadian census. It is part of the census agglomeration of Amos.

== History ==
Sainte-Gertrude-Manneville was founded on January 1st 1980.

== Demographics ==
Historical census populations – Sainte-Gertrude-Manneville

Year	Pop.	±%
1981	724	—
1986	770	+6.4%
1991	779	+1.2%
1996	809	+3.9%
2001	785	−3.0%

Year	Pop.	±%
2006	811	+3.3%
2011	757	−6.7%
2016	787	+4.0%
2021	793	+0.8%

Source: Statistics Canada

Private dwellings occupied by usual residents (2021): 311 (total dwellings: 325)

Mother tongue (2021):

- English as first language: 0%
- French as first language: 99.4%
- English and French as first language: 0.6%
- Other as first language: 0%

== Government ==
Municipal council (as of 2023):

- Mayor: Pascal Rheault
- Councillors: Michel Rivard, Yvan Proulx, François Binet, Régis Audet, Yanick Vachon, Johanne Rheault
