= Authier, Quebec =

Authier
- Municipality
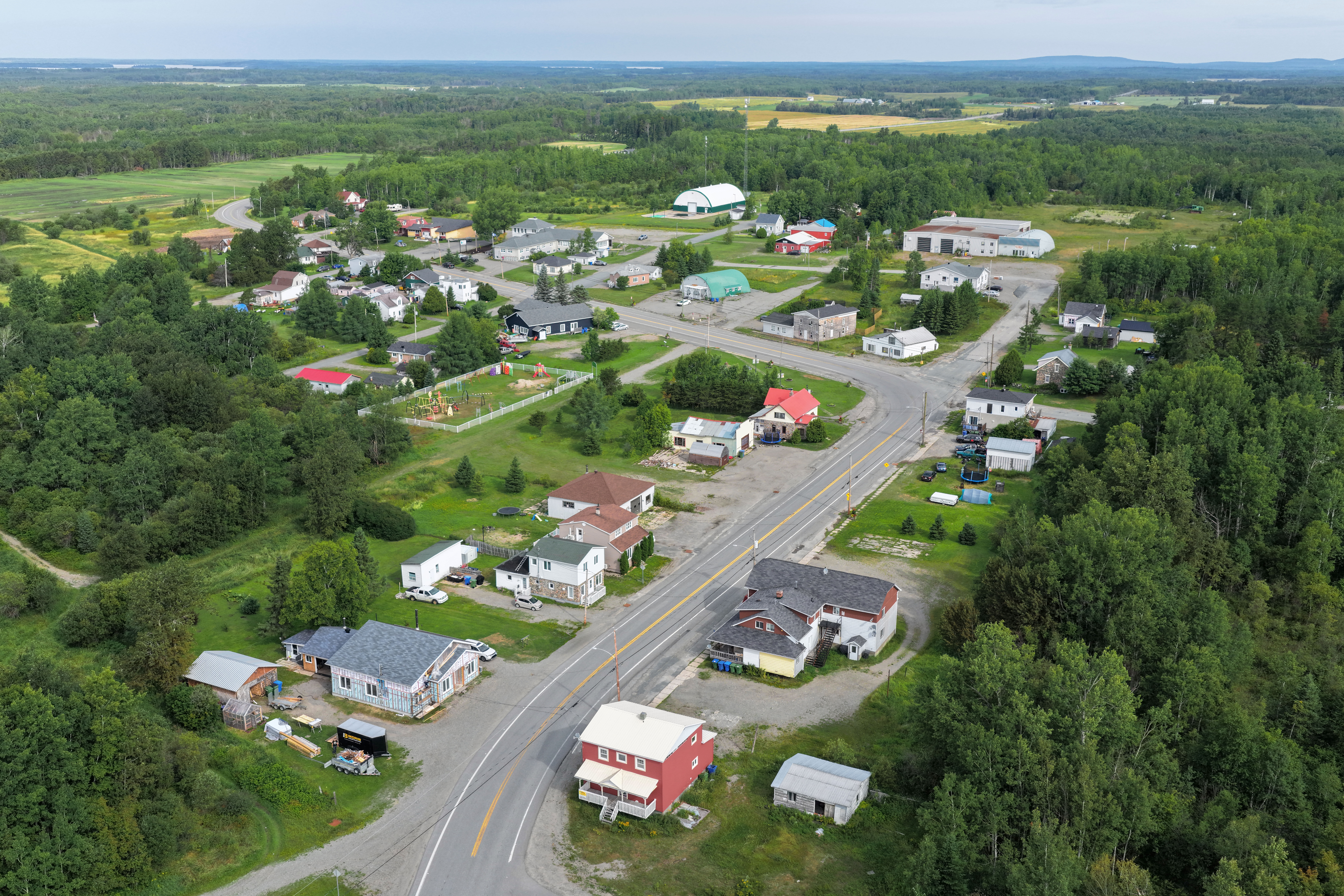
- Authier in summer

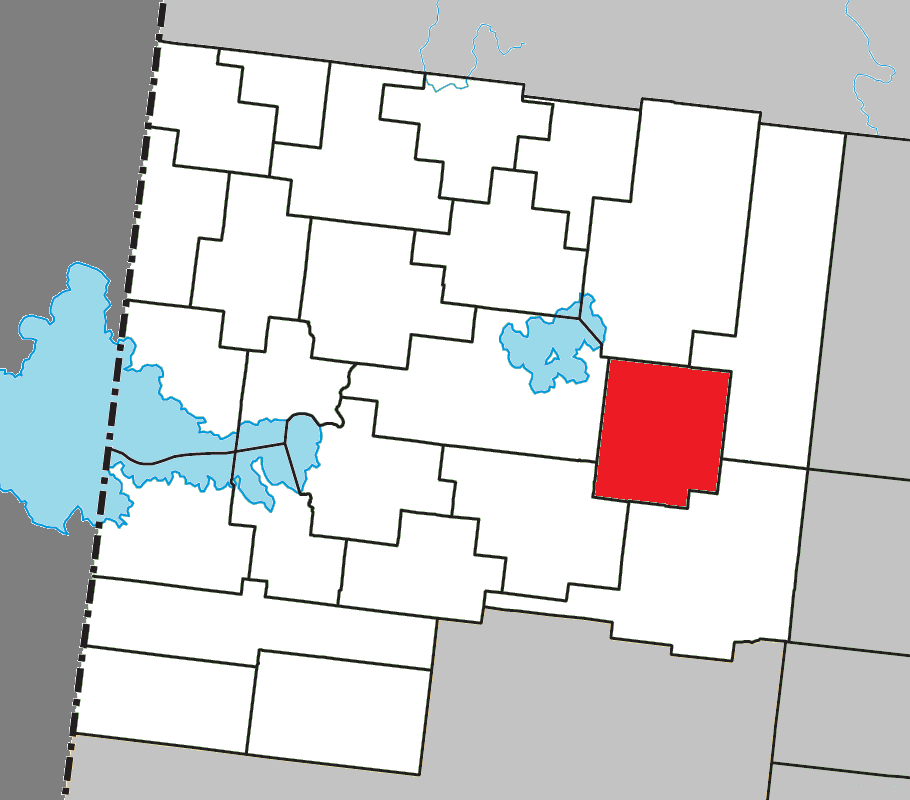
- Location within Abitibi-Ouest RCM

- Location in western Quebec
- Coordinates: 48°44′N 78°51′W
- Country: Canada
- Province: Quebec
- Region: Abitibi-Témiscamingue
- RCM: Abitibi-Ouest
- Settled: 1913
- Constituted: September 20, 1918

Government
  - Mayor: Yvon Gagné
  - Federal riding: Abitibi—Témiscamingue
  - Prov. riding: Abitibi-Ouest

Area
  - Total: 143.54 km^{2} (55.42 sq mi)
  - Land: 142.22 km^{2} (54.91 sq mi)

Population (2021)
  - Total: 290
  - Density: 2/km^{2} (5.2/sq mi)
  - Pop (2016-21): ▲8.2%
  - Dwellings: 134
- Time zone: UTC−5 (EST)
  - Summer (DST): UTC−4 (EDT)
- Postal code(s): J0Z 1C0
- Area code: 819
- Highways: R-111
- Website: authier.ao.ca/fr/

Authier (French pronunciation: [otje]) is a municipality in northwestern Quebec, Canada, in the Abitibi-Ouest Regional County Municipality. It had a population of 290 in the 2021 Canadian census.

The municipality was constituted on September 20, 1918, and is named after Hector Authier (1881–1971).

== History ==
Authier was founded on September 20, 1918.

== Demographics ==
Historical census populations – Authier, Quebec

Year	Pop.	±%
1921	317	—
1931	574	+81.1%
1941	878	+53.0%
1951	831	−5.4%
1956	806	−3.0%
1961	673	−16.5%
1966	560	−16.8%
1971	542	−3.2%
1976	461	−14.9%

Year	Pop.	±%
1981	389	−15.6%
1986	381	−2.1%
1991	361	−5.2%
1996	324	−10.2%
2001	318	−1.9%
2006	247	−22.3%
2011	282	+14.2%
2016	268	−5.0%
2021	290	+8.2%

Population figures based on revised counts.
Source: Statistics Canada

Private dwellings occupied by usual residents (2021): 129 (total dwellings: 134)

Mother tongue (2021):

- English as first language: 0%
- French as first language: 98.3%
- English and French as first language: 1.7%
- Other as first language: 0%

== Government ==
Municipal council (as of 2023):

- Mayor: Yvon Gagné
- Councillors: Nathalie Gaudette, Angèle Auger, Cindy Demers, Ghislain Desaulniers, Véronique Hince, François Deschênes

List of former mayors:

- Rita Julien (...–2001)
- Pierre Lambert (2005–2013)
- Marcel Cloutier (2013–2022)
- Yvon Gagné (2022–present)
