= Quebec Route 393 =

Highway in Quebec, Canada

Route 393

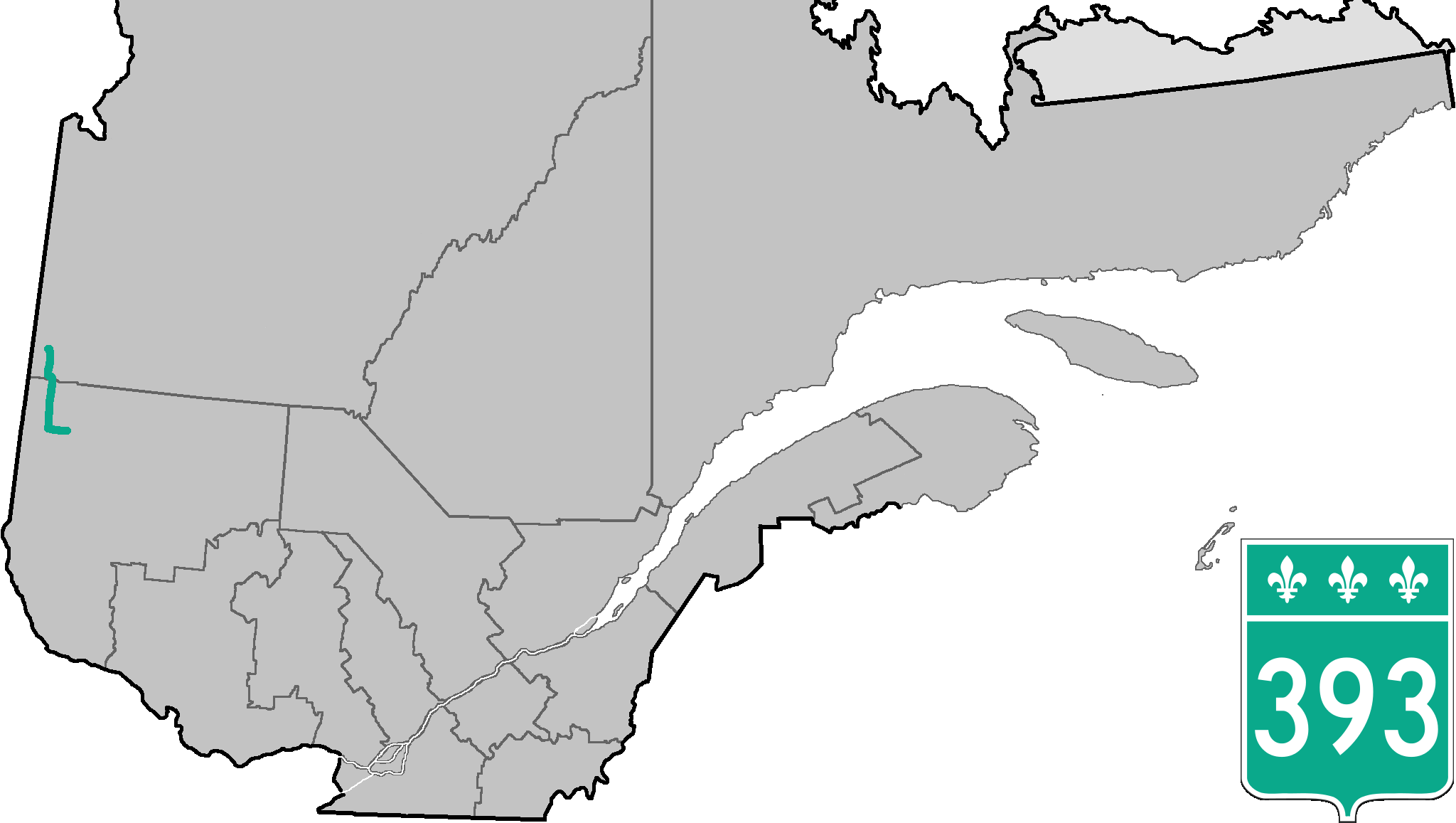

Route information
- Maintained by Transports Québec
- Length: 98 km (61 mi)

Major junctions
- South end: R-101 in Rouyn-Noranda
- R-111 in La Sarre
- North end: Val-Paradis in 'Baie-James (Route-des-Richesses)

Location
- Country: Canada
- Province: Quebec
- Major cities: Rouyn-Noranda, La Sarre

Highway system
- Quebec provincial highways; Autoroutes; List; Former
← R-391	→ R-395

Route 393 is a Quebec provincial highway located in the province's Abitibi-Témiscamingue and Nord-du-Québec regions. The highway runs from the junction of Route 101 in the Rouyn-Noranda suburb of Destor and ends in Val-Paradis in the municipality of Baie-James. In La Sarre it overlaps Route 111.

== Municipalities along Route 393 ==
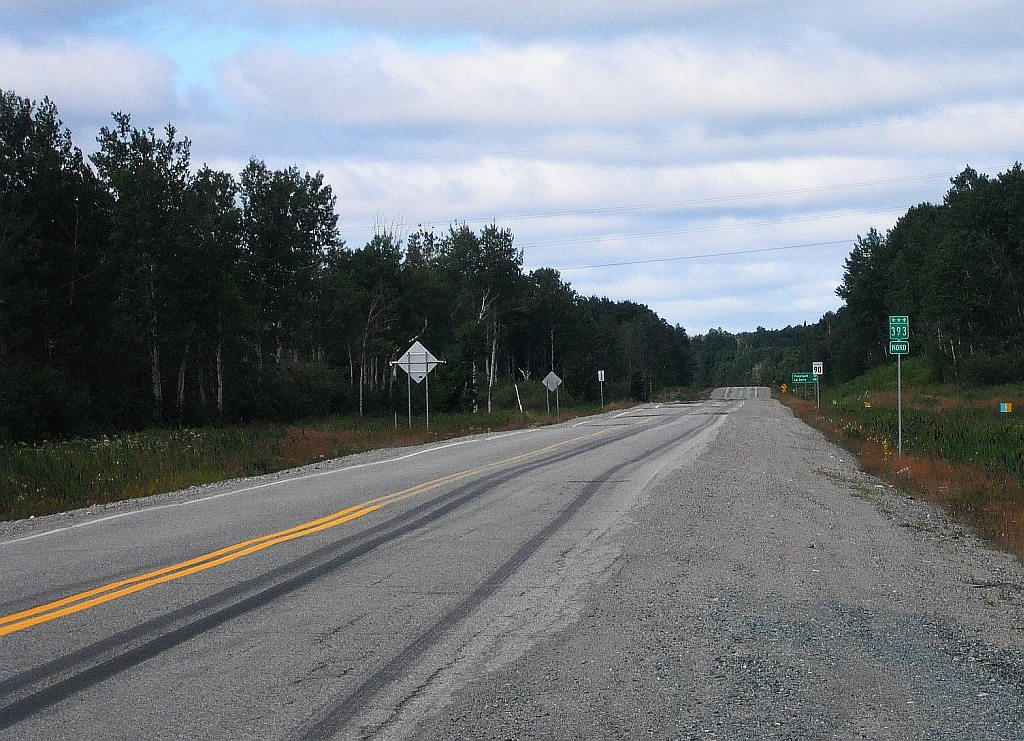
Quebec Route 393 in Rouyn-Noranda

- Rouyn-Noranda
- Duparquet
- Rapide-Danseur
- Palmarolle
- Sainte-Hélène-de-Mancebourg
- La Sarre
- Clermont (Val-Saint-Gilles)
- Baie-James (Beaucanton / Val-Paradis)

== See also ==
- List of Quebec provincial highways
