= Sainte-Hélène-de-Mancebourg =

- Parish municipality
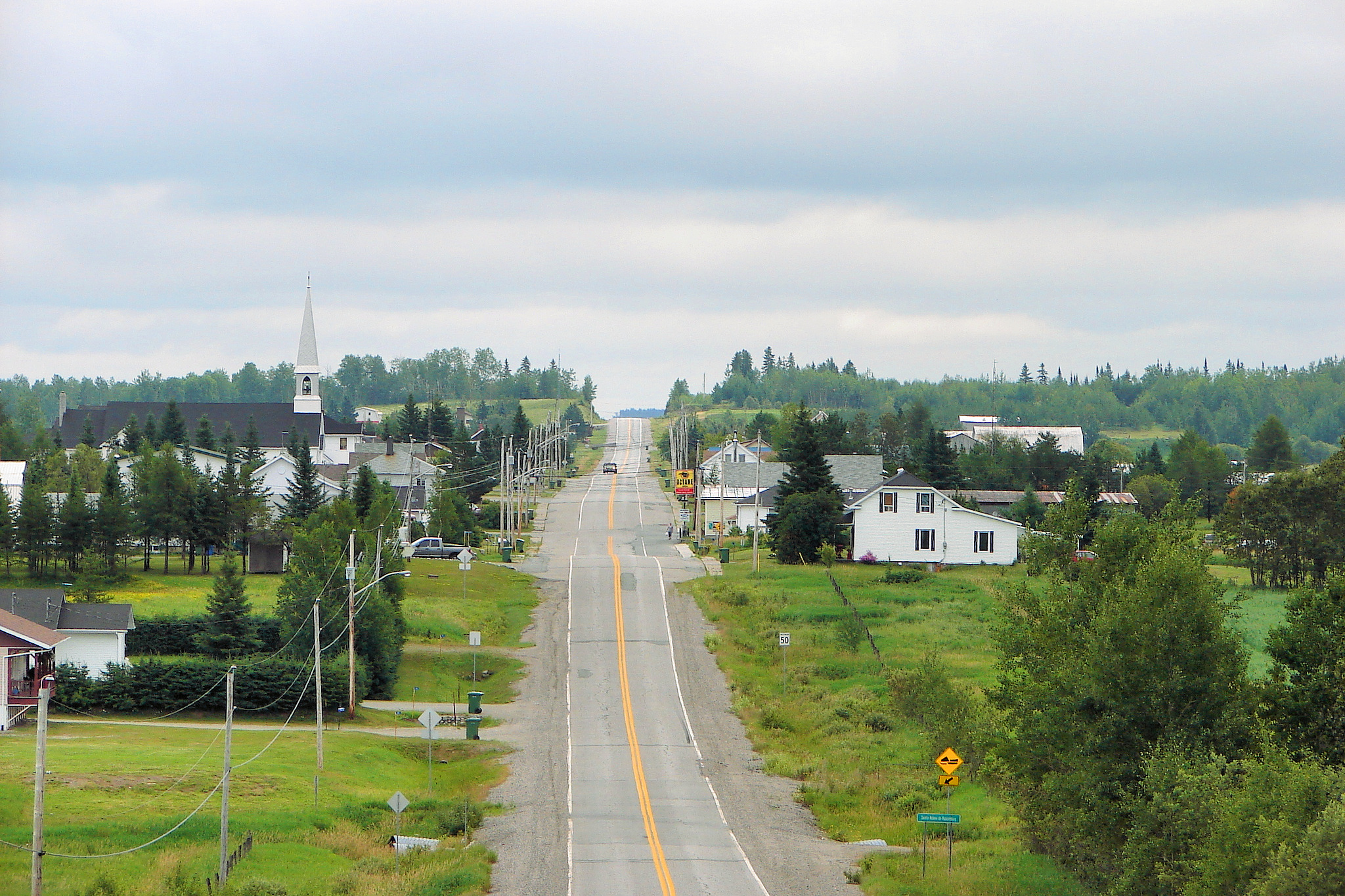

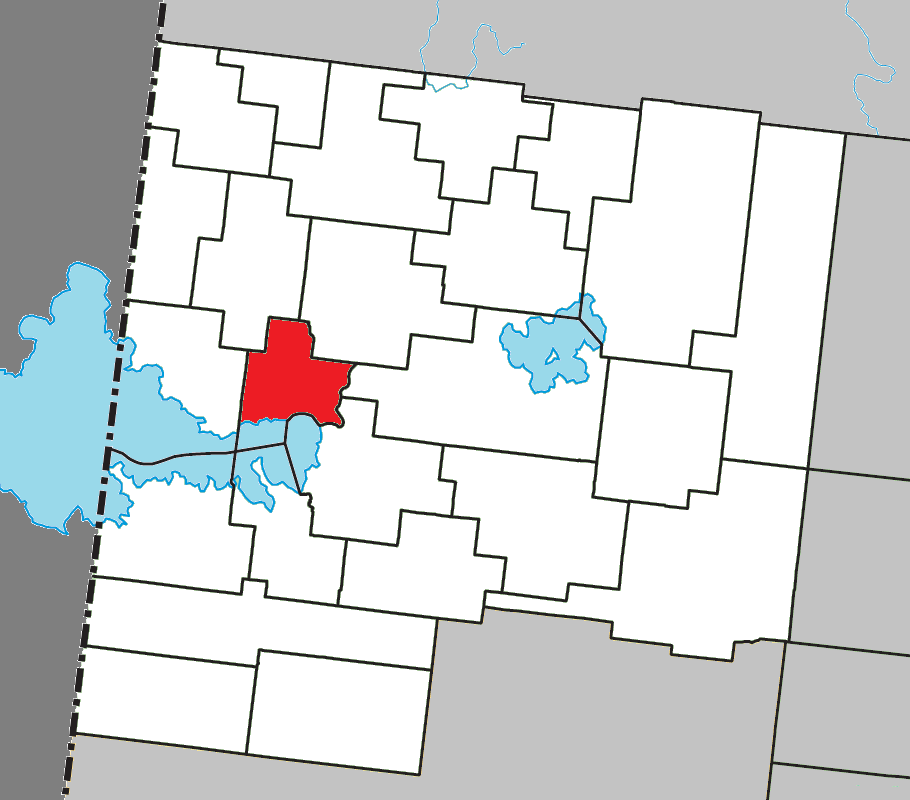
- Location within Abitibi-Ouest RCM

- Location in western Quebec
- Coordinates: 48°44′N 79°18′W
- Country: Canada
- Province: Quebec
- Region: Abitibi-Témiscamingue
- RCM: Abitibi-Ouest
- Settled: 1919
- Constituted: May 10, 1941

Government
  - Mayor: Rémi Morin
  - Federal riding: Abitibi—Témiscamingue
  - Prov. riding: Abitibi-Ouest

Area
  - Total: 68.96 km^{2} (26.63 sq mi)
  - Land: 68.15 km^{2} (26.31 sq mi)

Population (2021)
  - Total: 410
  - Density: 6/km^{2} (16/sq mi)
  - Pop (2016-21): ▲9.9%
  - Dwellings: 185
- Time zone: UTC−5 (EST)
  - Summer (DST): UTC−4 (EDT)
- Postal code(s): J0Z 2T0
- Area code: 819
- Highways: No major routes
- Website: ste-helene.ao.ca

Sainte-Hélène-de-Mancebourg is a parish municipality in northwestern Quebec, Canada in the Abitibi-Ouest Regional County Municipality. It covers 68.15 km^{2} and had a population of 410 as of the 2021 Canadian census. The municipality was created in 1941.

The name Sainte-Hélène-de-Mancebourg recalls the memory of two women, Helena, mother of Constantine I, and Jeanne Mance. Saint Helena's greatest claim to fame is the discovery of the True Cross during a trip to the Holy Places in 326, according to a widespread legendary tradition. Jeanne Mance co-founded the city of Montreal. The ‘bourg’ element underlines the presence of an inhabited core on the territory.

== History ==
Sainte-Hélène-de-Mancebourg was founded on May 10, 1941.

== Demographics ==
=== Population ===
In the 2021 Census of Population conducted by Statistics Canada, Sainte-Hélène-de-Mancebourg had a population of 410 living in 159 of its 185 total private dwellings, a change of 9.9% from its 2016 population of 373. With a land area of 68.15 km^{2} (26.31 sq mi), it had a population density of 6.0/km^{2} (15.6/sq mi) in 2021.

Canada census – Sainte-Hélène-de-Mancebourg community profile

	2021	2016	2011
Population	410 (+9.9% from 2016)	373 (+5.4% from 2011)	354 (-5.6% from 2006)
Land area	68.15 km^{2} (26.31 sq mi)	68.71 km^{2} (26.53 sq mi)	68.46 km^{2} (26.43 sq mi)
Population density	6.0/km^{2} (16/sq mi)	5.4/km^{2} (14/sq mi)	5.2/km^{2} (13/sq mi)
Median age	41.2 (M: 41.2, F: 40.8)	45.2 (M: 46.0, F: 44.8)	43.0 (M: 43.8, F: 40.8)
Private dwellings	185 (total) 159 (occupied)	177 (total) 154 (occupied)	168 (total)
Median household income	$83,000	$67,584	$60,899

References: 2021 2016 2011

Historical census populations – Sainte-Hélène-de-Mancebourg

Year	Pop.	±%
1941	419	—
1951	560	+33.7%
1956	612	+9.3%
1961	587	−4.1%
1966	562	−4.3%
1971	491	−12.6%
1976	457	−6.9%
1981	454	−0.7%

Year	Pop.	±%
1986	436	−4.0%
1991	398	−8.7%
1996	415	+4.3%
2001	384	−7.5%
2006	375	−2.3%
2011	354	−5.6%
2016	373	+5.4%
2021	410	+9.9%

Source: Statistics Canada

Private dwellings occupied by usual residents (2021): 159 (total dwellings: 185)

Mother tongue (2021):

- English as first language: 0%
- French as first language: 98.8%
- English and French as first language: 1.2%
- Other as first language: 0%

== Government ==
Municipal council (as of 2023):

- Mayor: Rémi Morin
- Councillors: Florent Bédard, Ghislain Gagné, Monia Cloutier, Claudette Bédard, Raymonde Petitclerc, Yvon Morin

List of former mayors:

- Béloni Aubin (1941–1943)
- Welly Vachon (1943–1945, 1947–1949)
- Édouard Théberge (1945–1947)
- Napoléon Fournier (1947, 1955–1959)
- Arthur Bédard (1949–1951)
- Joseph Picard (1951–1955)
- Victorin Veillette (1959–1961)
- Conrad Bergeron (1961–1985)
- Jocelyn Breton (1985–1986)
- Robert St-Amour (1986–1987)
- Gérard Audet (1987–1993)
- André Bergeron (1993–1996)
- André Bédard (1996–1997)
- Florent Bédard (1997–2021)
- Rémi Morin (2021–present)
