= Preissac =

- Municipality
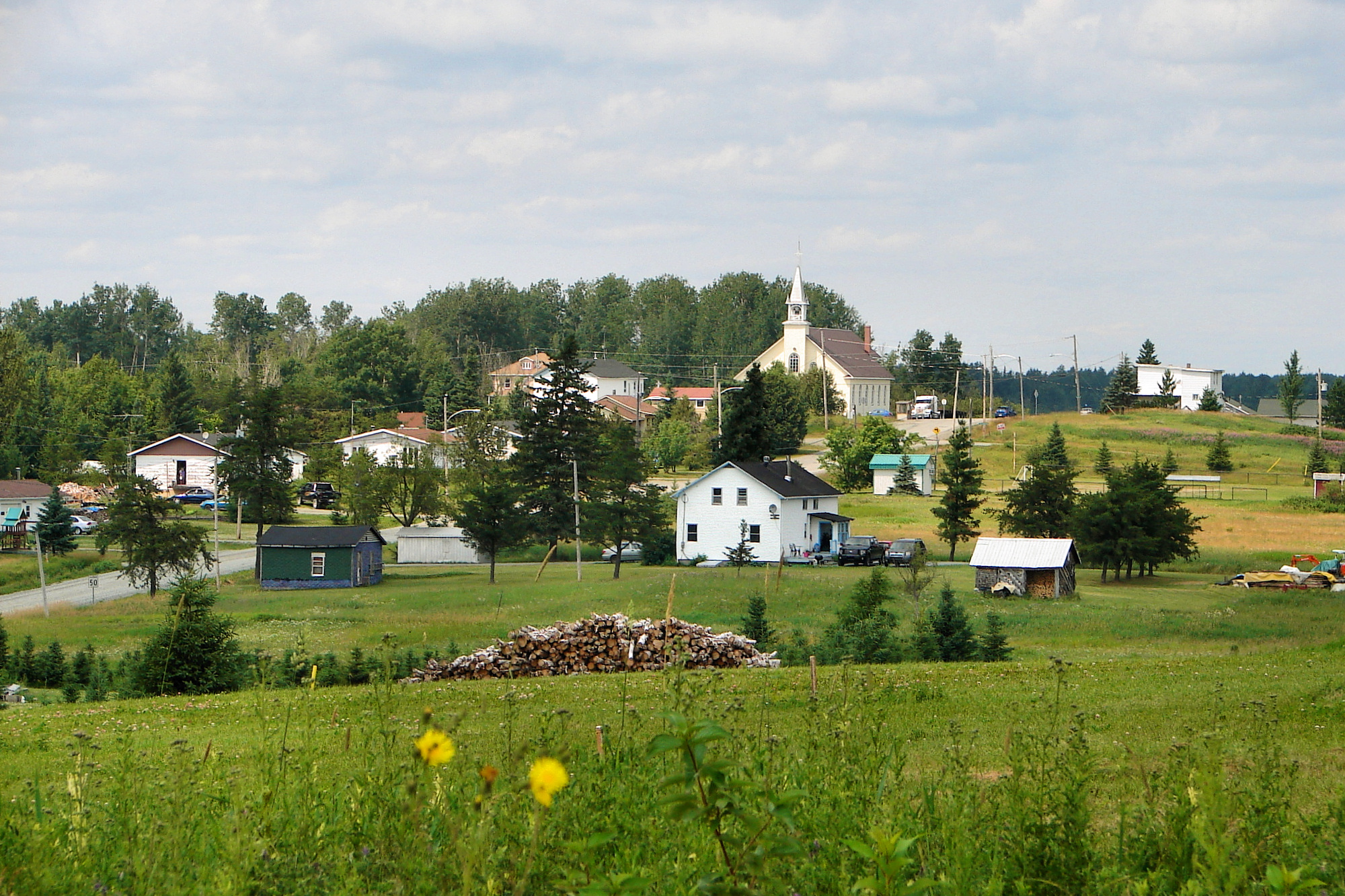

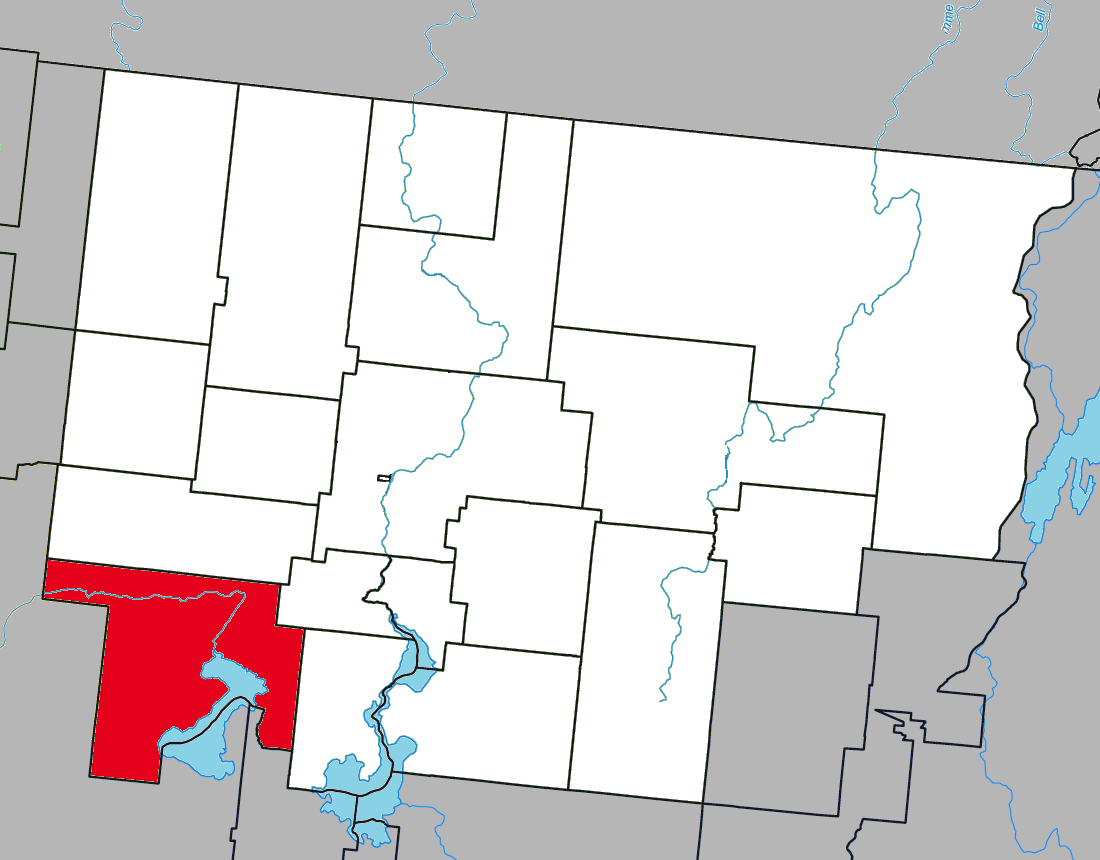
- Location within Abitibi RCM

- Location in western Quebec
- Coordinates: 48°24′N 78°22′W
- Country: Canada
- Province: Quebec
- Region: Abitibi-Témiscamingue
- RCM: Abitibi
- Settled: 1934
- Constituted: January 1, 1979

Government
  - Mayor: Donald Rheault
  - Federal riding: Abitibi—Témiscamingue
  - Prov. riding: Abitibi-Ouest

Area
  - Total: 506.29 km^{2} (195.48 sq mi)
  - Land: 422.13 km^{2} (162.99 sq mi)

Population (2021)
  - Total: 914
  - Density: 2.2/km^{2} (5.7/sq mi)
  - Pop (2016-21): ▲9.5%
  - Dwellings: 527
- Time zone: UTC−05:00 (EST)
  - Summer (DST): UTC−04:00 (EDT)
- Postal code(s): J0Y 2E0
- Area code: 819
- Highways: R-395
- Website: www.preissac.com

Preissac (French pronunciation: [pʁɛsak]) is a municipality in the Canadian province of Quebec, located in the Abitibi Regional County Municipality. The village of Preissac itself is located at the north end of Lake Preissac.

It is named after Lambert Preissac de Cadeihan, a lieutenant in the Régiment de Berry that was part of General Montcalm's army.

== History ==
- 1906 : Opening of the first molybdenite mine
- 1916 : Establishment of the geographic township (canton) of Preissac.
- 1934 : Arrival of the first settlers under the Vautrin Plan
- 1936: Start of construction of the St-Raphael de Preissac church.
- January 1, 1979 : The Municipality of Preissac is established from previously unincorporated territory.
- 1979 : Opening of the Bousquet mine
- 1980 : Opening of the Doyon mine
- 1988 : Opening of Dumagami mine (later renamed La Ronde) operated by Agnico-Eagle which was the source in the 1990s of more than half of Quebec's gold production

== Demographics ==
Historical census populations – Preissac

Year	Pop.	±%
1981	453	—
1986	455	+0.4%
1991	529	+16.3%
1996	619	+17.0%
2001	684	+10.5%

Year	Pop.	±%
2006	726	+6.1%
2011	786	+8.3%
2016	835	+6.2%
2021	914	+9.5%

Source: Statistics Canada

Private dwellings occupied by usual residents (2021): 430 (total dwellings: 527)

Mother tongue (2021):

- English as first language: 1.6%
- French as first language: 97.8%
- English and French as first language: 0.5%
- Other as first language: 0%

== Government ==
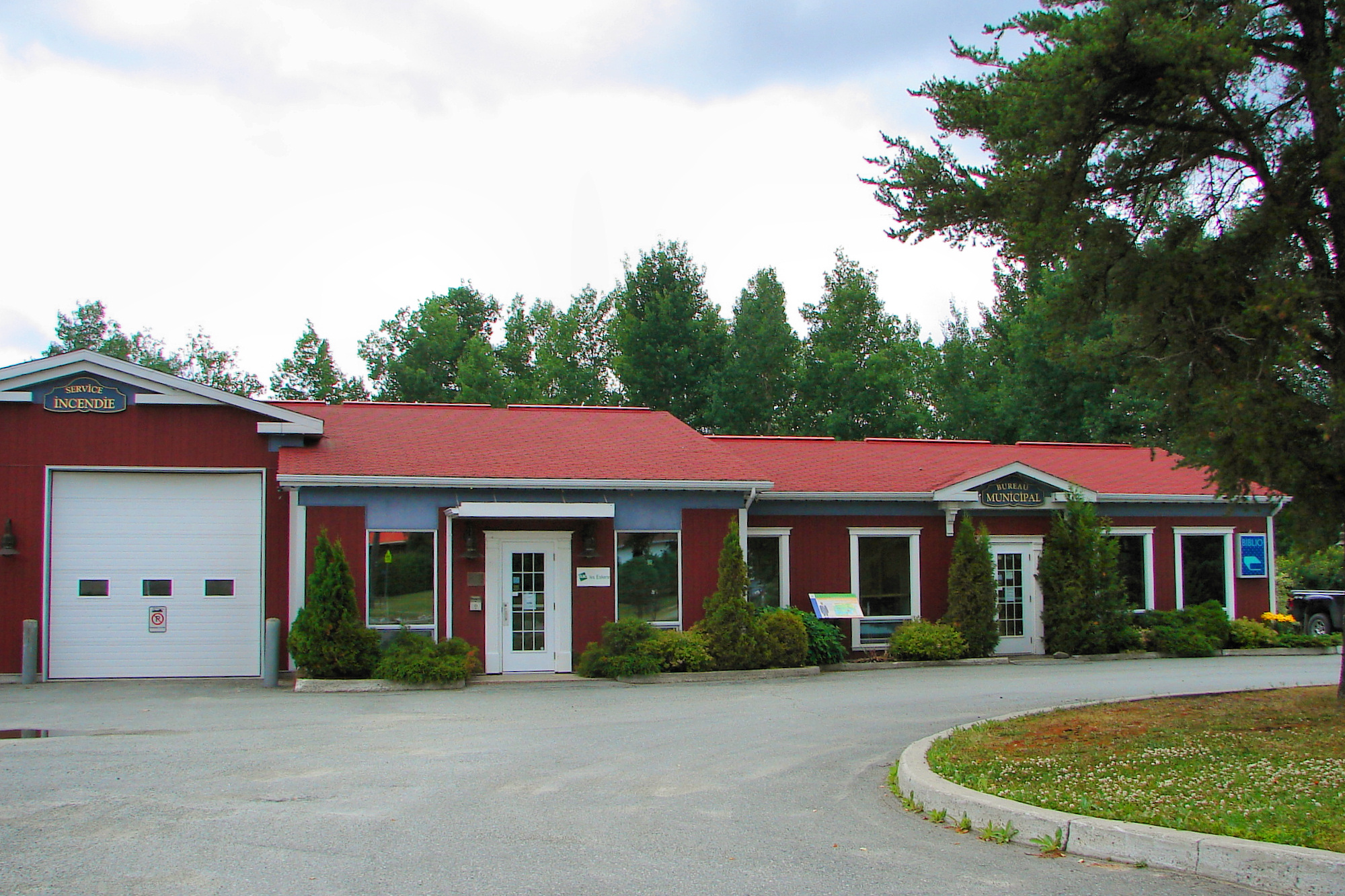
Municipal office

Municipal council (as of 2023):

- Mayor: Donald Rheault
- Councillors: Casandra Couture, Jean-Paul Gosselin, David Gervais, Amélie Massé, Isabelle Beaulieu, Sébastien Petitclerc

List of former mayors:

- Jean-Yves Gingras (...–2009)
- Huguette Saucier (2009–2013)
- Stephan Lavoie (2013–2020)
- Nicole Poulin (2020)
- Donald Rheault (2020–present)
