= La Sarre =

- City
- La Sarre in 2026

- Coat of arms
- Motto: Oblivisci Nescius
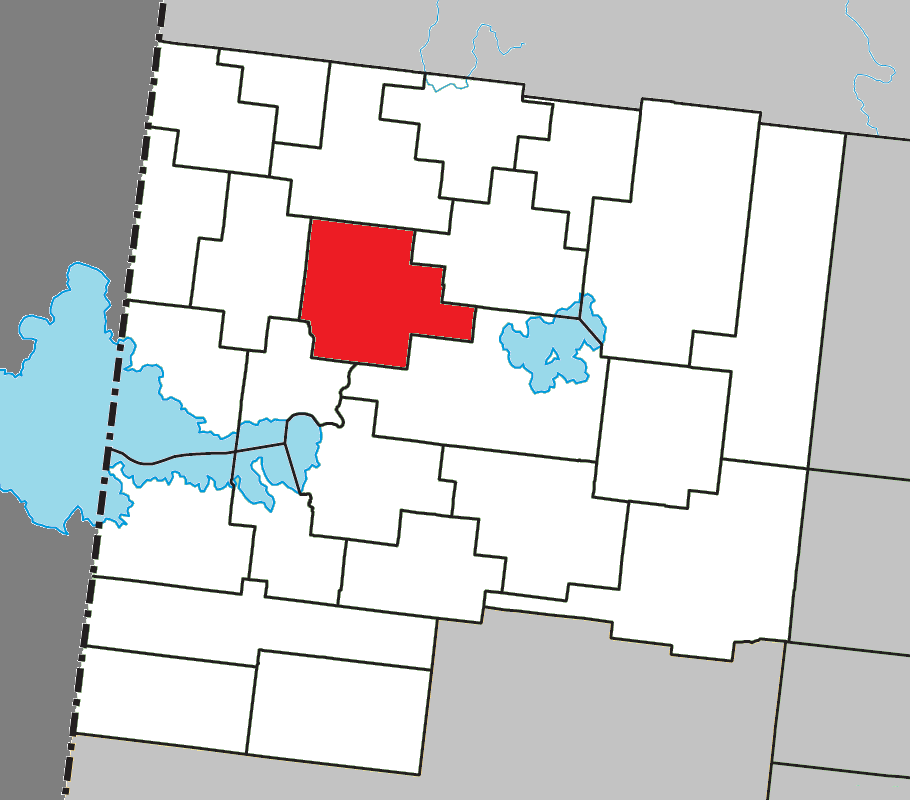
- Location within Abitibi-Ouest RCM

- Location in western Quebec
- Coordinates: 48°48′N 79°12′W
- Country: Canada
- Province: Quebec
- Region: Abitibi-Témiscamingue
- RCM: Abitibi-Ouest
- Settled: 1912
- Constituted: 19 April 1980

Government
  - Mayor: Yves Dubé
  - Federal riding: Abitibi—Témiscamingue
  - Prov. riding: Abitibi-Ouest

Area
  - Total: 153.24 km^{2} (59.17 sq mi)
  - Land: 148.36 km^{2} (57.28 sq mi)

Population (2021)
  - Total: 7,358
  - Density: 49.6/km^{2} (128/sq mi)
  - Pop (2016-21): ▲1.0%
  - Dwellings: 3,698
- Time zone: UTC−5 (EST)
  - Summer (DST): UTC−4 (EDT)
- Postal code(s): J9Z
- Area code: 819
- Highways: R-111 R-393
- Website: www.ville.lasarre.qc.ca

La Sarre (French pronunciation: [la saʁ]) is a town in northwestern Quebec, Canada, and is the most populous town and seat of the Abitibi-Ouest Regional County Municipality. It is located at the intersection of Routes 111 and 393, on the La Sarre River, a tributary of Lake Abitibi.

In addition to La Sarre itself, the town's territory also includes the community of Bienvenu, located along Route 111 west of the La Sarre River.

== History ==
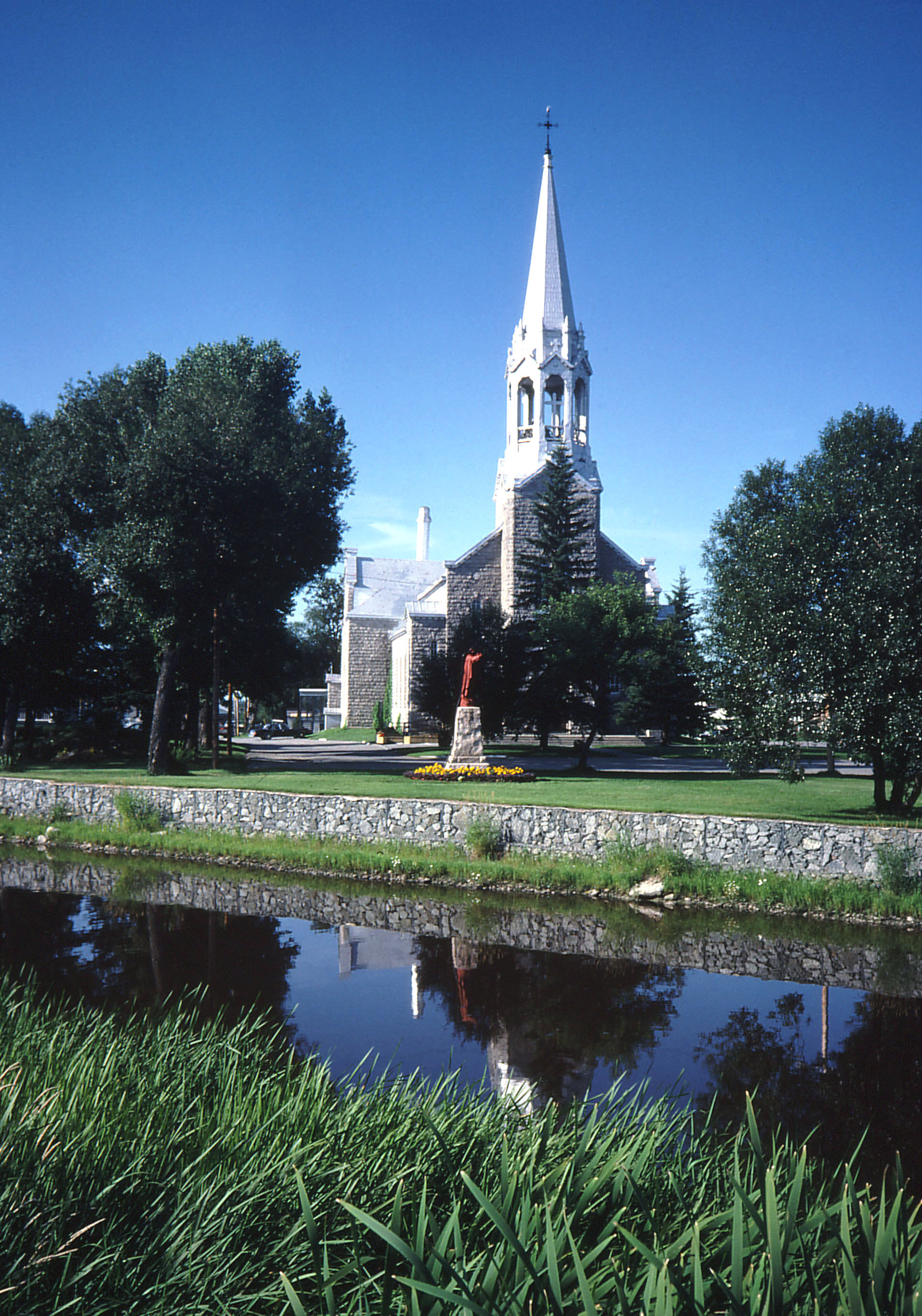
La Sarre Church

Before colonization, the area was home to the indigenous Algonquin who called the place Wabakin, from wàba and akin meaning "there is a mountain of hardwood", and called the La Sarre River Adikameg Sibi, which was also identified as Amikitik.

The first white settlers, six in number, settled as squatters on the land in the late 19th century and were discovered during the survey of the township in 1908. Real colonization began at the time when the National Transcontinental Railway running through the Abitibi region was completed. The first permanent pioneer family arrived in 1912, followed by more settlers and development drawn to the area for its mining, forestry, and agricultural potential, and resulted in the formation of the settlement. In 1915, the post office opened, and a year later, the La Sarre Township was proclaimed, named after the La Sarre Regiment that was recognized for its part in the Battle of Carillon and the capture of Fort Oswego. In 1917, the Township Municipality of La Sarre was established, the same year as the Parish of Saint-André-de-la-Sarre. The Hudson's Bay Company opened a post in 1932, and only operated until 1941.

In 1937, the village separated from the township and was incorporated as the Village Municipality of La Sarre. It gained town (ville) status on 17 August 1949. In April 1980, the town and township municipality merged to form the current municipality.

== Geography ==
=== Climate ===
La Sarre has a borderline humid continental climate (Köppen Dfb), close to a subarctic climate (Dfc). Winters are very cold and snowy, with an annual snowfall of 2.47 metres or 97.24 inches, although thaws due to inflows of warm air from the southeast can raise temperatures above freezing and on 6 February 1988 temperatures rose to a remarkable 20.5 °C or 68.9 °F. The hotter half of the year is pleasantly warm, though it can rain frequently.

Climate data for La Sarre
Month	Jan	Feb	Mar	Apr	May	Jun	Jul	Aug	Sep	Oct	Nov	Dec	Year
Record high °C (°F)	7.8 (46.0)	20.5 (68.9)	17.0 (62.6)	29.0 (84.2)	31.7 (89.1)	35.0 (95.0)	37.2 (99.0)	33.3 (91.9)	32.2 (90.0)	26.1 (79.0)	17.8 (64.0)	11.1 (52.0)	37.2 (99.0)
Mean daily maximum °C (°F)	−11.7 (10.9)	−8.9 (16.0)	−1.8 (28.8)	7.2 (45.0)	15.9 (60.6)	21.5 (70.7)	23.5 (74.3)	21.5 (70.7)	15.7 (60.3)	8.7 (47.7)	−0.6 (30.9)	−8.6 (16.5)	6.9 (44.4)
Daily mean °C (°F)	−18.2 (−0.8)	−16.2 (2.8)	−8.8 (16.2)	0.8 (33.4)	8.9 (48.0)	14.3 (57.7)	16.9 (62.4)	15.2 (59.4)	10.3 (50.5)	4.3 (39.7)	−4.5 (23.9)	−14 (7)	0.7 (33.3)
Mean daily minimum °C (°F)	−24.6 (−12.3)	−23.4 (−10.1)	−15.7 (3.7)	−5.7 (21.7)	1.8 (35.2)	7.0 (44.6)	10.3 (50.5)	8.7 (47.7)	4.7 (40.5)	−0.2 (31.6)	−8.4 (16.9)	−19.4 (−2.9)	−5.4 (22.3)
Record low °C (°F)	−47 (−53)	−47 (−53)	−43.9 (−47.0)	−31.7 (−25.1)	−12 (10)	−6.7 (19.9)	−2 (28)	−3.5 (25.7)	−8.5 (16.7)	−13 (9)	−34 (−29)	−44.5 (−48.1)	−47 (−53)
Average precipitation mm (inches)	58.6 (2.31)	37.9 (1.49)	52.4 (2.06)	55.9 (2.20)	78.2 (3.08)	84.7 (3.33)	101.0 (3.98)	99.0 (3.90)	110.7 (4.36)	81.5 (3.21)	67.6 (2.66)	62.3 (2.45)	889.8 (35.03)
Average rainfall mm (inches)	5.4 (0.21)	2.8 (0.11)	14.4 (0.57)	40.5 (1.59)	74.8 (2.94)	84.7 (3.33)	101 (4.0)	99 (3.9)	110.1 (4.33)	73.5 (2.89)	30.1 (1.19)	7.3 (0.29)	643.6 (25.35)
Average snowfall cm (inches)	53.3 (21.0)	35.1 (13.8)	38 (15)	15.5 (6.1)	3.4 (1.3)	0 (0)	0 (0)	0 (0)	0.6 (0.2)	8.1 (3.2)	37.5 (14.8)	55 (22)	246.5 (97.4)
Average precipitation days (≥ 0.2 mm)	14.8	11.0	10.2	10.0	12.6	13.4	14.8	14.4	16.1	14.9	15.1	16.7	164
Average rainy days (≥ 0.2 mm)	0.76	0.67	3.1	7.4	12.3	13.4	14.8	14.4	15.9	13.3	5.5	1.5	103.03
Average snowy days	14.5	10.7	8.4	4.3	0.8	0.0	0.0	0.0	0.3	2.8	11.0	15.7	68.5
Source: Environment Canada

== Demographics ==
In the 2021 Census of Population conducted by Statistics Canada, La Sarre had a population of 7,358 living in 3,493 of its 3,698 total private dwellings, a change of 1% from its 2016 population of 7,282. With a land area of 148.36 km^{2} (57.28 sq mi), it had a population density of 49.6/km^{2} (128.5/sq mi) in 2021.

Canada census – La Sarre community profile

	2021	2016	2011
Population	7,358 (+1.0% from 2016)	7,282 (-5.7% from 2011)	7,719 (+5.2% from 2006)
Land area	148.36 km^{2} (57.28 sq mi)	148.50 km^{2} (57.34 sq mi)	148.74 km^{2} (57.43 sq mi)
Population density	49.6/km^{2} (128/sq mi)	49.0/km^{2} (127/sq mi)	51.9/km^{2} (134/sq mi)
Median age	50.4 (M: 48.8, F: 52.8)	48.2 (M: 46.3, F: 50.5)	46.6 (M: 44.9, F: 47.9)
Private dwellings	3,698 (total) 3,493 (occupied)	3,643 (total)	3,617 (total)
Median household income	$59,600	$52,119	$43,315

References: 2021 2016 2011

Historical Census Data - La Sarre, Quebec

Year	Pop.	±%
1941	2,167	—
1951	2,744	+26.6%
1956	3,155	+15.0%
1961	3,944	+25.0%
1966	4,798	+21.7%
1971	5,185	+8.1%
1976	4,978	−4.0%
1981	8,861	+78.0%

Year	Pop.	±%
1986	8,622	−2.7%
1991	8,513	−1.3%
1996	8,345	−2.0%
2001	7,728	−7.4%
2006	7,336	−5.1%
2011	7,719	+5.2%
2016	7,282	−5.7%
2021	7,358	+1.0%

Source: Statistics Canada

Canada Census Mother Tongue - La Sarre, Quebec
Census	Total	French			English			French & English			Other		
Year	Responses	Count	Trend	Pop %	Count	Trend	Pop %	Count	Trend	Pop %	Count	Trend	Pop %
2021	7,310	7,175	▲0.6%	98.2%	35	▼22.2%	0.5%	40	▲100.0%	0.5%	40	0.0%	0.5%
2016	7,235	7,130	▼5.1%	98.5%	45	▼30.8%	0.6%	20	▼33.3%	0.3%	40	▼33.3%	0.6%
2011	7,665	7,510	▲5.8%	98.0%	65	▲30.0%	0.9%	30	▲20.0%	0.4%	60	▲33.3%	0.8%
2006	7,220	7,100	▼5.6%	98.3%	50	▲66.7%	0.7%	25	▼16.7%	0.4%	45	▼18.2%	0.6%
2001	7,635	7,520	▼8.0%	98.5%	30	▲20.0%	0.4%	30	0.0%	0.4%	55	▲450.0%	0.7%
1996	8,240	8,175	n/a	99.2%	25	n/a	0.3%	30	n/a	0.4%	10	n/a	0.1%

== Economy ==
The main local resource is the forest, which covers over 4,700 square kilometres (1,800 sq mi) and provides lumber to the town's main employers Norbord and Tembec, as well as agriculture, with over 60% of its land under cultivation. The mining industry, together with small service sector businesses, complements the economy. The area's flying needs are served by La Sarre Airport.

== Government ==
=== Municipal council ===
- Mayor: Yves Dubé
- Councillors: Pierre Bourget, Steve Fontaine, Réjean Fournier, Victor Fournier, Karine Goulet, Renée Thiboutot

=== List of mayors ===
Former mayors of La Sarre were:

- Adélard Cousineau 1917
- Félix Brousseau 1919
- Léonidas Boisvert 1920
- Hormidas Gauthier 1921–23
- Jules Lavigne 1923–31
- Edmond Mercier 1931–33
- Oscar Létourneau 1933–36
- Adrien Mercier 1936–39
- Gustave Rheault 1939–41
- Paul Bélanger 1941–44
- G. Eugène Lambert 1944–47
- Arthur Fortin 1947
- Fernand Doyon 1947–48
- Gérard Mercier 1948

- François-Xavier Martel 1948–51
- Gérard Mercier 1951–53
- Adélard Pelletier 1953–55
- Clément Déry 1955–63
- Hector Gagné 1963–68
- Roger Cousineau 1968–69
- Yves Baltazard 1969–72
- Raymond Thibault 1972–77
- Paul-Aurèle St-Pierre 1977–92
- Guy Carignan 1992–93
- Guillaume Marquis 1993–96
- J-Horace Lessard 1996–2003
- Normand Houde 2003–2017
- Yves Dubé (2017–present)

== Notable people ==
- Aurèle Audet, (1920-2015), former Member of the National Assembly of Quebec
- Marie-Claude Audet, former cyclist
- Yvan Bordeleau, former Member of the National Assembly of Quebec
- Gérard Laprise, (1925-2000), former Member of Parliament
- Bob Mongrain, former ice hockey player
- Christine Moore, former Member of Parliament
- Doris Piché, badminton player
- Sébastien Piché, ice hockey player
- Pierre St-Amand, CMM CD, Royal Canadian Air Force Lieutenant-General
- Gilles Ste-Croix, vice president and co-creator of Cirque du Soleil.

== See also ==
- List of cities in Quebec
