= Landron =

Landron may refer to:

== Person ==
- Jack Landron, an Afro-Puerto Rican folksinger, songwriter and actor
- Jérémie Landron (1840–1904), a pharmacist-chemist- gold-and-silver assayer who estimated the treasure discovered in Ledringhem in 1852
- William Omar Landron (stage name: Don Omar, born 1978), a Puerto Rican Reggaetón singer and actor
- Manny Landron, former Army Infantry Soldier and retired Army Signal Corp Officer.

== Toponyms ==
- Landron Lake is a freshwater lake of the unorganized territory of Lac-Lenôtre, Quebec, in La Vallée-de-la-Gatineau Regional County Municipality, in the administrative region of the Outaouais, Quebec, in Quebec, in Canada.
