= Sainte-Thérèse-de-la-Gatineau =

- Municipality
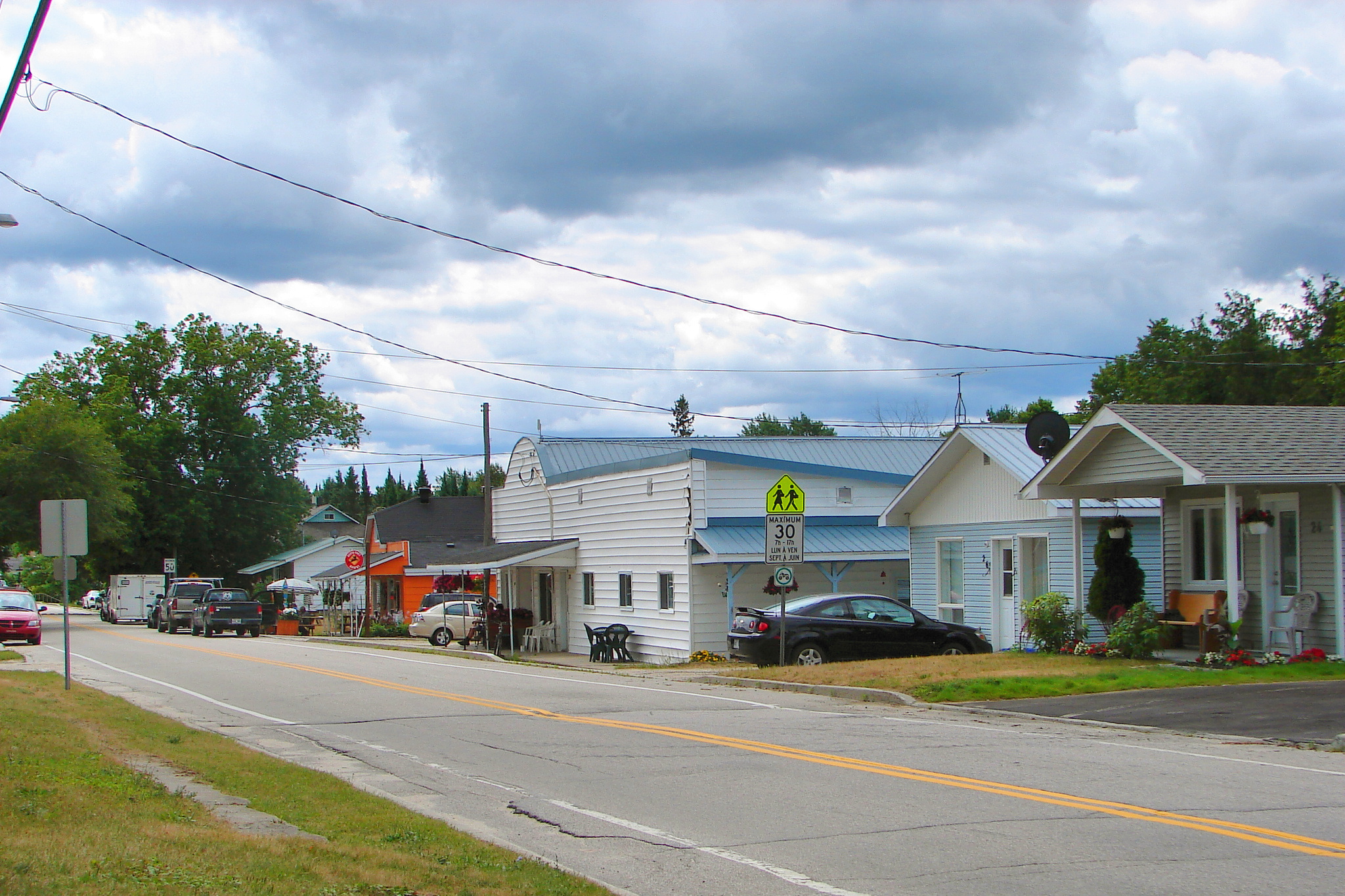

- Location in western Quebec
- Coordinates: 46°18′N 75°52′W
- Country: Canada
- Province: Quebec
- Region: Outaouais
- RCM: La Vallée-de-la-Gatineau
- Constituted: January 1, 1946

Government
  - Mayor: Roch Carpentier
  - Federal riding: Pontiac—Kitigan Zibi
  - Prov. riding: Gatineau

Area
  - Total: 79.43 km^{2} (30.67 sq mi)
  - Land: 60.68 km^{2} (23.43 sq mi)

Population (2021)
  - Total: 588
  - Density: 9.7/km^{2} (25/sq mi)
  - Pop (2016–21): ▲13.1%
  - Dwellings: 534
- Time zone: UTC−5 (EST)
  - Summer (DST): UTC−4 (EDT)
- Postal code(s): J0X 2X0
- Area code: 819
- Highways: No major routes
- Website: www.sainte-therese-de-la-gatineau.ca

Sainte-Thérèse-de-la-Gatineau (French pronunciation: [sɛ̃t teʁɛz də la ɡatino]) is a municipality in the Outaouais region of Quebec, Canada. Located between the Gatineau River and Thirty-One Mile Lake, it is the smallest municipality in terms of population in the La Vallée-de-la-Gatineau Regional County Municipality.

== History ==
It takes its name from the Sainte-Thérèse-de-l'Enfant-Jésus Parish, formed in 1934, which in turn was named after Saint Thérèse of the Child Jesus (1873–1897).

In 1946, the Municipality of Sainte-Thérèse-de-la-Gatineau was formed when it separated from the Township of Cameron.

== Demographics ==
Historical census populations – Sainte-Thérèse-de-la-Gatineau

Year	Pop.	±%
1976	440	—
1981	440	+0.0%
1986	409	−7.0%
1991	380	−7.1%
1996	411	+8.2%

Year	Pop.	±%
2001	377	−8.3%
2006	335	−11.1%
2011	526	+57.0%
2016	520	−1.1%
2021	588	+13.1%

Source: Statistics Canada

Private dwellings occupied by usual residents: 288 (out of 534 total)

Languages:

- French as first language: 89.7%
