= Egan-Sud =

- Municipality
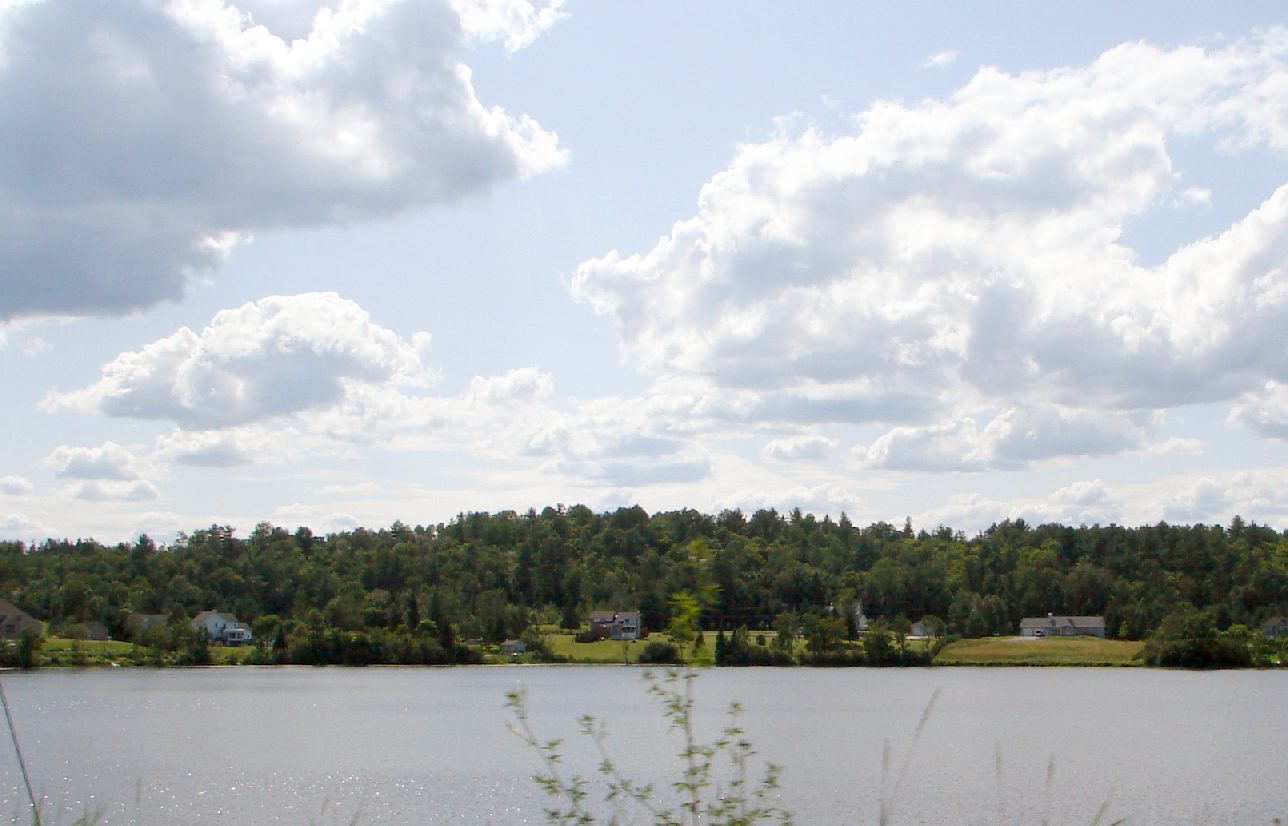
- Evans Lake

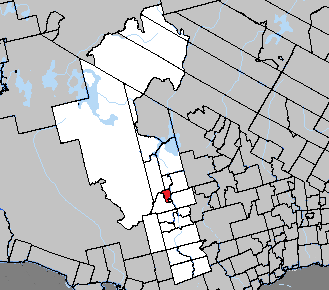
- Location within La Vallée-de-la-Gatineau RCM

- Location in western Quebec
- Coordinates: 46°26′N 76°00′W
- Country: Canada
- Province: Quebec
- Region: Outaouais
- RCM: La Vallée-de-la-Gatineau
- Constituted: November 17, 1920

Government
  - Mayor: Neil Gagnon
  - Federal riding: Pontiac—Kitigan Zibi
  - Prov. riding: Gatineau

Area
  - Total: 51.03 km^{2} (19.70 sq mi)
  - Land: 49.82 km^{2} (19.24 sq mi)

Population (2021)
  - Total: 508
  - Density: 10.2/km^{2} (26/sq mi)
  - Pop (2016–21): ▲0.8%
  - Dwellings: 258
- Time zone: UTC−5 (EST)
  - Summer (DST): UTC−4 (EDT)
- Postal code(s): J9E 3A9
- Area code: 819
- Website: www.egan-sud.ca

Egan-Sud is a municipality in the La Vallée-de-la-Gatineau Regional County Municipality, Quebec, Canada, directly north of Maniwaki.

It has a residential, agricultural, and commercial character, the last of which mainly concentrated along Highway 105.

In the winter, Evens Lake is home to the largest ice rink built by the MRC, having a circular route of about 1.2 kilometres (0.75 mi) long.

== History ==
Settlement in this area by Europeans began in the mid-nineteenth century. By 1863, there was a population of 140 people, most of Irish origin and almost all Catholics. In 1864, the Egan Township was proclaimed, named in memory of John Egan (1811-1857), an Irish immigrant, owner of large logging concessions in the Outaouais, and holder of several political offices. In 1881, the Municipality Township of Egan was formed, with Patrick Moore as first mayor who served until 1902.

In 1920, Egan Township was split up into the municipalities of Egan-Sud, Bois-Franc, and Montcerf (now Montcerf-Lytton). The first mayor of Egan-Sud was James Millar.

== Demographics ==
Historical census populations – Egan-Sud, Quebec

Year	Pop.	±%
1921	1,656	—
1931	459	−72.3%
1941	579	+26.1%
1951	854	+47.5%
1956	306	−64.2%
1961	401	+31.0%
1966	435	+8.5%
1971	411	−5.5%
1976	451	+9.7%

Year	Pop.	±%
1981	541	+20.0%
1986	499	−7.8%
1991	520	+4.2%
1996	578	+11.2%
2001	539	−6.7%
2006	508	−5.8%
2011	542	+6.7%
2016	504	−7.0%
2021	508	+0.8%

Includes revised count for 2001.
Source: Statistics Canada

The language statistics are as follows (as of the 2021 Census): 88% of Egan-Sud speak French as their first language, 6% speak English as their first language, 4% speak both French and English as a first language and 1% have a different first language.

== Government ==
List of former mayors:

- James Millar
- David Courtney
- Steven McSheffrey
- William P. McConnery
- Albert Bernatchez (1954–1979)
- René-Guy Moreau (1979–1997)
- Evelyne Hubert (2003–2005)
- Michel Cyr (2005–200?)
- Neil Gagnon (200?–present)
