= Cascades-Malignes =

- Unorganized territory
- Location in western Quebec
- Coordinates: 47°07′N 76°06′W
- Country: Canada
- Province: Quebec
- Region: Outaouais
- RCM: La Vallée-de-la-Gatineau
- Constituted: January 1, 1986

Government
  - Fed. riding: Pontiac—Kitigan Zibi
  - Prov. riding: Gatineau

Area
  - Total: 547.9 km^{2} (211.5 sq mi)
  - Land: 480.88 km^{2} (185.67 sq mi)

Population (2021)
  - Total: 0
  - Density: 0/km^{2} (0/sq mi)
  - Change (2016–21): N/A
  - Dwellings: 0
- Time zone: UTC−5 (EST)
  - Summer (DST): UTC−4 (EDT)

Cascades-Malignes (French pronunciation: [kaskad maliɲ]) is an unorganized territory in the Outaouais region of Quebec, Canada, one of five unorganized territories in the La Vallée-de-la-Gatineau Regional County Municipality.

The territory is named after the Cascades Malignes (French for "Malicious Cascades") which are a series of chutes on the Gens de Terre River. This river forms the eastern boundary of the territory and of the La Vérendrye Wildlife Reserve as well. The log drivers who went down this river had nicknamed it La Maline (malignant) because its flow hid many obstacles. It is also known as Malin Rapides.

== Demographics ==
Historical census populations – Cascades-Malignes

Year	Pop.	±%
1981	0	—
1986	0	0.00%
1991	0	0.00%
1996	0	0.00%
2001	0	0.00%

Year	Pop.	±%
2006	0	0.00%
2011	0	0.00%
2016	0	0.00%
2021	0	0.00%

Source: Statistics Canada
