= Lac-Moselle =

- Unorganized territory
- Location in western Quebec
- Coordinates: 47°31′N 75°35′W
- Country: Canada
- Province: Quebec
- Region: Outaouais
- RCM: La Vallée-de-la-Gatineau
- Constituted: January 1, 1986

Government
  - Fed. riding: Pontiac—Kitigan Zibi
  - Prov. riding: Gatineau

Area
  - Total: 1,277.71 km^{2} (493.33 sq mi)
  - Land: 1,144.81 km^{2} (442.01 sq mi)

Population (2021)
  - Total: 0
  - Density: 0/km^{2} (0/sq mi)
  - Change (2016–21): N/A
  - Dwellings: 0
- Time zone: UTC−5 (EST)
  - Summer (DST): UTC−4 (EDT)

Lac-Moselle (French pronunciation: [lak mɔzɛl]) is an unorganized territory in the Outaouais region of Quebec, Canada. It is one of the five unorganized and unpopulated wilderness areas in the La Vallée-de-la-Gatineau Regional County Municipality. It is named after Lake Moselle.

== Demographics ==
Historical census populations – Lac-Moselle

Year	Pop.	±%
1986	0	—
1991	0	0.00%
1996	0	0.00%
2001	0	0.00%

Year	Pop.	±%
2006	0	0.00%
2011	0	0.00%
2016	0	0.00%
2021	0	0.00%

Source: Statistics Canada
