= Low, Quebec =

Low
- Township municipality
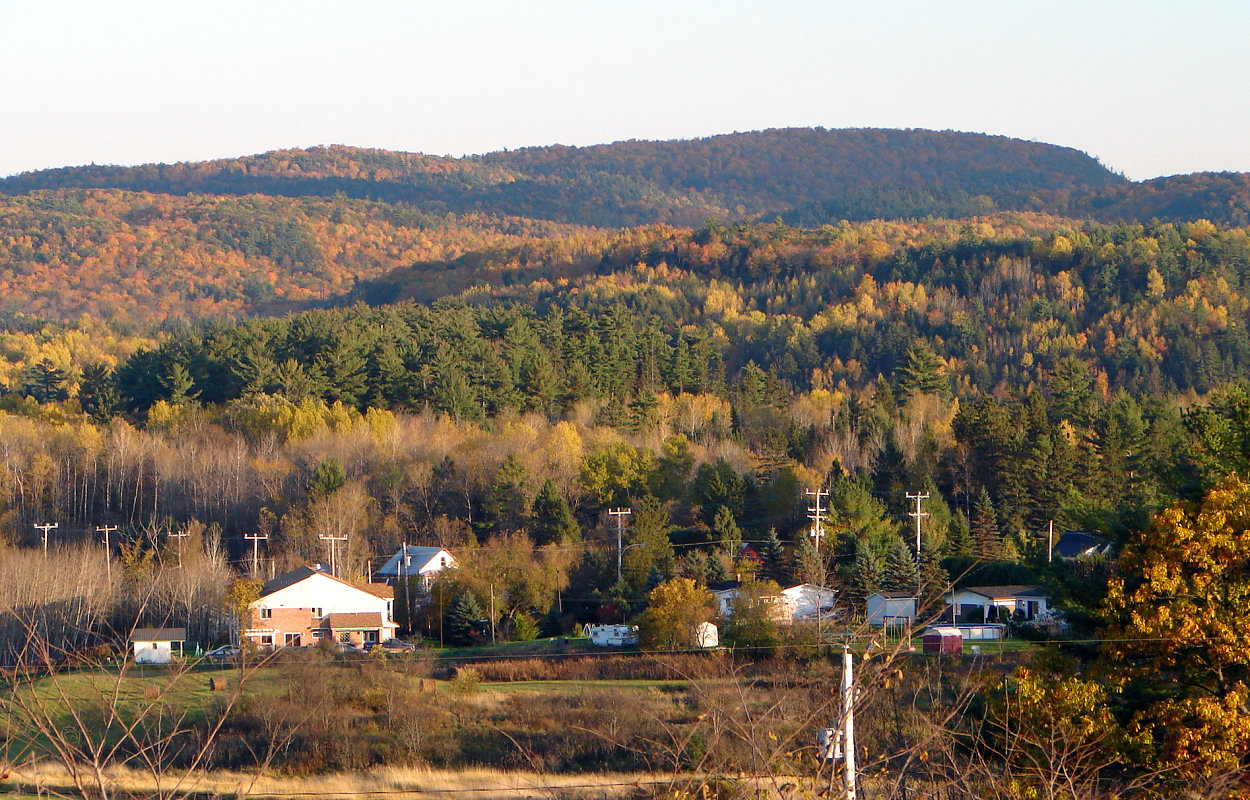
- Nickname: Paugan
- Location in western Quebec
- Coordinates: 45°49′N 75°57′W
- Country: Canada
- Province: Quebec
- Region: Outaouais
- RCM: La Vallée-de-la-Gatineau
- Constituted: 1 January 1858

Government
  - Mayor: Patrick Beaudry
  - Federal riding: Pontiac—Kitigan Zibi
  - Prov. riding: Gatineau

Area
  - Total: 276.32 km^{2} (106.69 sq mi)
  - Land: 257.78 km^{2} (99.53 sq mi)

Population (2021)
  - Total: 1,020
  - Density: 4/km^{2} (10/sq mi)
  - Pop (2016–21): ▲3.9%
  - Dwellings: 864
- Time zone: UTC−05:00 (EST)
  - Summer (DST): UTC−04:00 (EDT)
- Postal code(s): J0X 2C0
- Area code: 819
- Access Routes: R-105
- Website: www.lowquebec.ca

Low is a township municipality in the La Vallée-de-la-Gatineau Regional County Municipality of western Quebec, Canada. It is situated along the Gatineau River north of Wakefield, and it is located within Canada's National Capital Region.

== Geography ==
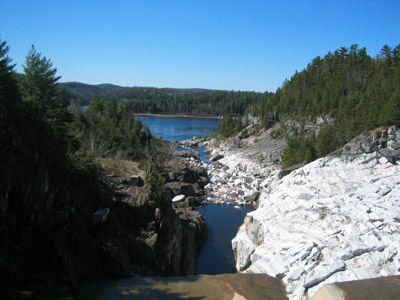
View of the Gatineau River from the Paugan Dam

Low is situated in a corner of mountainous terrain on the edge of the Gatineau Hills, but conducive to agriculture. It is dotted with an abundance of lakes, most notably Sainte-Marie, Island, Doyle, Cameron, and Venosta Lakes.

In addition to the village of Low itself, other communities in the township municipality are Brennan's Hill, Fieldville, Martindale, North Low, Paugan Falls, Stagsburn, and Venosta.

== History ==
Low represents a rare case where the township was formed after the municipality; the township dates back to 1859 whereas the municipality was founded in 1848 and the municipality township was officially established on 1 January 1857, and came into force on 1 January 1858. It was named after Charles Adamson Low, an important timber merchant of the region in the mid-19th century, a time when many Irish immigrants settled here. Its post office was established in 1854.

In 1928, the village of Low built the Paugan hydroelectric dam. This caused the voluntary flooding of the village to the north, Lac Saint Marie, Quebec. Because of the dam, 90% of the village of Lac Saint Marie had to be relocated to higher ground.

A section of Low called Tucker Lake was home of the Gatineau Clog, a country music festival founded by Wayne Rostad in 1980 until 1995.

== Politics ==
The current mayor of Low is Patrick Beaudry, who was elected in November 2025. The most recent former mayors were Carole Robert, Morris O'Connor and Michael Francis, who was mayor back in the mid-eighties, and was re-elected in 1997. Francis announced his retirement in the summer of 2009, and finished his term in November 2009.

== Demographics ==
Historical census populations – Low, Quebec

Year	Pop.	±%
1976	891	—
1981	881	−1.1%
1986	875	−0.7%
1991	892	+1.9%
1996	807	−9.5%

Year	Pop.	±%
2001	852	+5.6%
2006	956	+12.2%
2011	920	−3.8%
2016	982	+6.7%
2021	1,020	+3.9%

Source: Statistics Canada

In the 2021 Census of Population conducted by Statistics Canada, Low had a population of 1,020 living in 495 of its 864 total private dwellings, a change of 3.9% from its 2016 population of 982. With a land area of 257.78 km^{2} (99.53 sq mi), it had a population density of 4.0/km^{2} (10.2/sq mi) in 2021.

Mother tongue (2021):

- English as first language: 53%
- French as first language: 42%
- English and French as first language: 4%
- Other as first language: 1%

== Paugan Hydroelectric Station ==
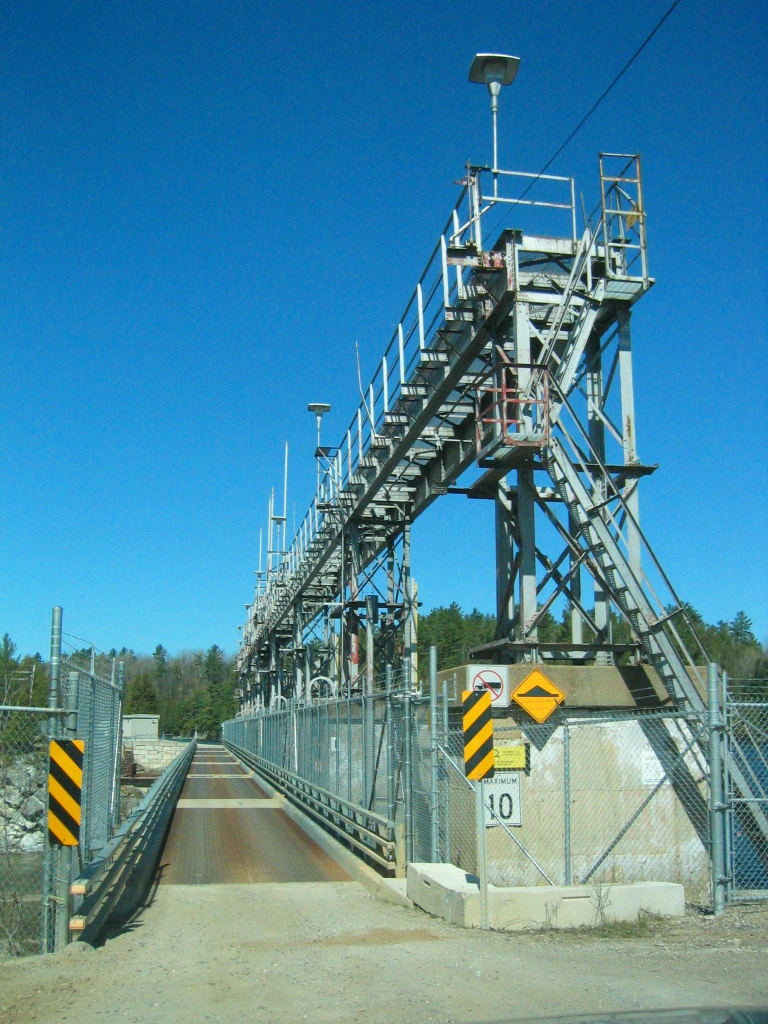
Paugan Station

The Paugan Station (Centrale de Paugan), built in 1928, is a run-of-river hydroelectric power station and dam on the Gatineau river, operated by Hydro-Québec. It has a head of 40.5 m (133 ft), and 8 turbines with a total capacity of 202 MW. Its reservoir is 30 km^{2} (12 sq mi).

== Local government ==
List of former mayors:

- Michael Francis (...–2009)
- Morris O'Connor (2009–2017)
- Carole Robert (2017–2025)
- Patrick Beaudry (2025-present)

== See also ==
- List of anglophone communities in Quebec
