= Dépôt-Échouani =

- Unorganized territory
- Location in western Quebec
- Coordinates: 47°50′N 75°35′W
- Country: Canada
- Province: Quebec
- Region: Outaouais
- RCM: La Vallée-de-la-Gatineau
- Constituted: January 1, 1986

Government
  - Fed. riding: Pontiac—Kitigan Zibi
  - Prov. riding: Gatineau

Area
  - Total: 336.56 km^{2} (129.95 sq mi)
  - Land: 308.12 km^{2} (118.97 sq mi)

Population (2021)
  - Total: 0
  - Density: 0/km^{2} (0/sq mi)
  - Change (2016–21): N/A
  - Dwellings: 0
- Time zone: UTC−5 (EST)
  - Summer (DST): UTC−4 (EDT)

Dépôt-Échouani is an unorganized territory in the Outaouais region of Quebec, Canada. It is the smallest and northernmost of the five unorganized territories in the La Vallée-de-la-Gatineau Regional County Municipality. Its territory surrounds Échouani Lake and stretches along the western banks of the upper Gatineau River.

The territory is named after the Échouani Depot, a former logging camp of the Canadian International Paper Company near the confluence of the Chouart and Gatineau Rivers, abandoned since 1962. The name is known since the nineteenth century and several variants have been used on maps and plans: Eshwaham (1873), Eskwahani (1924), Eshwahani (1926), Échouani (1933), as well as Eshawan and Askwahani (dates unknown). The exact origin and significance of this name is unknown, but one possibility is that the word comes from Echoam, a tributary of the Gatineau, and this in turn is a derivative of echohamok, which is from the Algonquin language probably meaning "to prepare to leave by water".

== Demographics ==
Historical census populations – Dépôt-Échouani
| Year | Pop. | ±% |
|---|---|---|
| 1991 | 0 | — |
| 1996 | 0 | 0.00% |
| 2001 | 0 | 0.00% |
| 2006 | 0 | 0.00% |
| 2011 | 0 | 0.00% |
| 2016 | 0 | 0.00% |
| 2021 | 0 | 0.00% |
Source: Statistics Canada
