= List of postal codes of Canada: J =

This is a list of postal codes in Canada where the first letter is J. Postal codes beginning with J are located within the Canadian province of Quebec. Only the first three characters are listed, corresponding to the Forward Sortation Area (FSA).

Canada Post provides a free postal code look-up tool on its website, via its mobile apps for such smartphones as the iPhone and BlackBerry, and sells hard-copy directories and CD-ROMs. Many vendors also sell validation tools, which allow customers to properly match addresses and postal codes. Hard-copy directories can also be consulted in all post offices, and some libraries.

== Western and Northern Quebec ==
There are currently 159 FSAs in this list.

=== Urban ===
J1A; Coaticook	J2A; Drummondville; Southeast	J3A; Saint-Jean- sur-Richelieu; North	J4A; Not assigned	J5A; Saint-Constant	J6A; Repentigny; South	J7A; Rosemere	J8A; Saint-Hippolyte	J9A; Gatineau (Plateau, Birch Manor, Val-Tétreau)
J1B; Not assigned	J2B; Drummondville; Saint-Majorique-de-Grantham	J3B; Saint-Jean- sur-Richelieu; Central	J4B; Boucherville	J5B; Delson	J6B; Not assigned	J7B; Blainvile; South	J8B; Sainte-Adèle	J9B; Chelsea
J1C; Sherbrooke (Bromptonville)	J2C; Drummondville; Central	J3C; Not assigned	J4C; Not assigned	J5C; Sainte-Catherine	J6C; Not assigned	J7C; Blainvile; Northwest	J8C; Sainte-Agathe- des-Monts; Ivry-sur-le-Lac	J9C; Not assigned
J1E; Sherbrooke; Northeast	J2E; Drummondville; Northwest	J3E; Sainte-Julie	J4E; Not assigned	J5E; Not assigned	J6E; Joliette; Saint-Charles-Borromée; Notre-Dame-des-Prairies; Saint-Pierre	J7E; Sainte-Thérèse; Central	J8E; Mont-Tremblant; Lac-Tremblant-Nord	J9E; Maniwaki; Déléage; Kitigan Zibi; Egan-Sud; Bois-Franc
J1G; Sherbrooke; East	J2G; Granby; Central	J3G; Beloeil; McMasterville; Saint-Mathieu-de-Beloeil	J4G; Longueuil; North	J5G; Not assigned	J6G; Not assigned	J7G; Boisbriand	J8G; Brownsburg-Chatham	J9G; Not assigned
J1H; Sherbrooke; Central	J2H; Granby; East	J3H; Mont-Saint-Hilaire; Otterburn Park	J4H; Longueuil; West	J5H; Not assigned	J6H; Not assigned	J7H; Sainte-Thérèse; Southwest	J8H; Lachute; Wentworth	J9H; Gatineau; South Aylmer
J1J; Sherbrooke; North	J2J; Granby; West	J3J; Not assigned	J4J; Longueuil; Central	J5J; Sainte-Sophie	J6J; Châteauguay; North	J7J; Mirabel (Saint-Janvier, Saint-Antoine, Domaine-Vert)	J8J; Not assigned	J9J; Gatineau; North Aylmer
J1K; Sherbrooke; West	J2K; Cowansville; Brigham; East Farnham	J3K; Not assigned	J4K; Longueuil; Southwest	J5K; Saint-Colomban	J6K; Châteauguay; South	J7K; Mascouche; Extremities	J8K; Not assigned	J9K; Not assigned
J1L; Sherbrooke; Northwest	J2L; Bromont	J3L; Chambly; Carignan; Richelieu; Saint-Mathias-sur-Richelieu	J4L; Longueuil; Southeast	J5L; Saint-Jérôme; West	J6L; Not assigned	J7L; Mascouche; Central	J8L; Gatineau (Buckingham); L'Ange-Gardien; Mayo; Mulgrave-et-Derry	J9L; Mont-Laurier
J1M; Sherbrooke (Lennoxville)	J2M; Shefford	J3M; Marieville	J4M; Longueuil; East	J5M; Saint-Lin–Laurentides	J6M; Not assigned	J7M; Terrebonne (La Plaine)	J8M; Gatineau (Masson-Angers)	J9M; Not assigned
J1N; Sherbrooke (Rock Forest, Deauville)	J2N; Farnham	J3N; Saint-Basile-le-Grand	J4N; Longueuil; Northeast	J5N; Sainte-Anne-des-Plaines	J6N; Beauharnois; Léry	J7N; Mirabel (Saint-Canut, Saint-Augustin, Sainte-Monique, Saint-Hermas, Saint-Jérusalem, Saint-Benoît)	J8N; Val-des-Monts; Denholm	J9N; Not assigned
J1P; Not assigned	J2P; Not assigned	J3P; Sorel-Tracy; Sainte-Anne-de-Sorel	J4P; Saint-Lambert; North	J5P; Not assigned	J6P; Not assigned	J7P; Saint-Eustache; Northeast	J8P; Gatineau; Southeast	J9P; Val-d'Or
J1R; Sherbrooke (Saint-Élie-d'Orford)	J2R; Saint-Hyacinthe; Northwest	J3R; Sorel-Tracy; Saint-Joseph-de-Sorel	J4R; Saint-Lambert; Central	J5R; La Prairie; Candiac	J6R; Mercier	J7R; Saint-Eustache; Deux-Montagnes	J8R; Gatineau; Northeast	J9R; Not assigned
J1S; Windsor; Val-Joli	J2S; Saint-Hyacinthe; Southwest	J3S; Not assigned	J4S; Saint-Lambert; South	J5S; Not assigned	J6S; Salaberry-de-Valleyfield; North	J7S; Not assigned	J8S; Not assigned	J9S; Not assigned
J1T; Val-des-Sources	J2T; Saint-Hyacinthe; East	J3T; Nicolet	J4T; Longueuil; West Saint-Hubert	J5T; Lavaltrie	J6T; Salaberry-de-Valleyfield; South	J7T; Saint-Lazare; Les Cèdres	J8T; Gatineau; Southwest	J9T; Amos
J1V; Not assigned	J2V; Not assigned	J3V; Saint-Bruno-de-Montarville	J4V; Longueuil (Greenfield Park)	J5V; Louiseville	J6V; Terrebonne (Lachenaie)	J7V; Vaudreuil-Dorion; Notre-Dame-de-l'Île-Perrot; L'Île-Perrot; Terrasse-Vaudreuil; Vaudreuil-sur-le-Lac; L'Île-Cadieux	J8V; Gatineau; Cantley	J9V; Ville-Marie; Duhamel-Ouest
J1W; Not assigned	J2W; Saint-Jean- sur-Richelieu (Saint-Luc)	J3W; Not assigned	J4W; Brossard; Northwest	J5W; L'Assomption; Saint-Sulpice	J6W; Terrebonne; Central	J7W; Pincourt	J8W; Not assigned	J9W; Not assigned
J1X; Magog; Orford	J2X; Saint-Jean- sur-Richelieu; East	J3X; Varennes	J4X; Brossard; Southwest	J5X; L'Épiphanie	J6X; Terrebonne; Northwest	J7X; Salaberry-de-Valleyfield; Les Coteaux	J8X; Gatineau; Downtown Hull	J9X; Rouyn-Noranda; Central
J1Y; Not assigned	J2Y; Saint-Jean- sur-Richelieu; West	J3Y; Longueuil; Central Saint-Hubert	J4Y; Brossard; South	J5Y; Repentigny; Northeast	J6Y; Terrebonne (Saint-Louis)	J7Y; Saint-Jérôme; North	J8Y; Gatineau; West Hull	J9Y; Rouyn-Noranda (Granada)
J1Z; Saint-Cyrille- de-Wendover	J2Z; Not assigned	J3Z; Longueuil; East Saint-Hubert	J4Z; Brossard; Northeast	J5Z; Repentigny; Charlemagne	J6Z; Rosemère; Bois-des-Filion; Lorraine	J7Z; Saint-Jérôme; Southeast	J8Z; Gatineau; North Hull	J9Z; La Sarre

=== Rural ===
J0A
Centre-du-Québec-Sud

1A0: Danville
1B0: Kingsey Falls
1C0: Saint-Adrien
1E0: Saint-Albert, Sainte-Séraphine
1G0: Saint-Camille
1H0: Sainte-Clotilde-de-Horton
1J0: Saint-Georges-de-Windsor
1K0: Saint-Rémi-de-Tingwick
1L0: Tingwick
1M0: Warwick, Sainte-Élizabeth-de-Warwick
1N0: Wotton

J0B
Estrie-Est

1A0: Ascot Corner
1B0: Austin
1C0: Ayer's Cliff (incl. Barnston West)
1E0: Stanstead
1G0: Dudswell (Bishopton)
1J0: Bury
1K0: Chartierville
1L0: Compton
1M0: Cookshire-Eaton (incl. Newport)
1P0: Dixville
1R0: East Angus, Westbury
1S0: East Hereford, Saint-Venant-de-Paquette
1T0: Georgeville (Stanstead)
1W0: Sainte-Catherine-de-Hatley
1X0: Kingsbury
1Y0: La Patrie, Hampden
2A0: Martinville
2B0: Melbourne, Ulverton
2C0: Hatley, North Hatley
2E0: Notre-Dame-des-Bois
2H0: Richmond, Cleveland
2K0: Stanstead
2L0: Dudswell
2M0: Saint-Benoît-du-Lac
2N0: Saint-Claude
2P0: Saint-Denis-de-Brompton
2R0: Sainte-Edwidge-de-Clifton (Sainte-Edwidge)
2T0: Saint-Félix-de-Kingsey
2V0: Saint-François-Xavier-de-Brompton
2W0: Saint-Herménégilde
2X0: Saint-Isidore-de-Clifton
2Y0: Saint-Malo
2Z0: Lingwick
3A0: Cookshire-Eaton (Sawyerville)
3B0: Scotstown
3E0: Stanstead, Stanstead-Est
3E3: Ogden
3G0: Stoke
3H0: Waterville
3J0: Weedon, Ham-Sud
4B0: Hatley

J0C
Centre-du-Québec-Ouest

1A0: Notre-Dame-du-Bon-Conseil (Bon-Conseil)
1B0: L'Avenir
1C0: Saint-Bonaventure
1E0: Sainte-Brigitte-des-Saults
1G0: Saint-Célestin
1J0: Saint-Eugène (Saint-Eugène-de-Grantham)
1K0: Saint-Germain-de-Grantham, Saint-Edmond-de-Grantham
1L0: Saint-Guillaume
1M0: Saint-Léonard-d'Aston
1N0: Saint-Lucien
1R0: Sainte-Perpétue
1S0: Wickham

J0E
Estrie-Ouest

1A0: Saint-Paul-d'Abbotsford
1B0: Abercorn
1E0: Ange-Gardien
1G0: Bolton-Est (East Bolton)
1H0: Bonsecours
1K0: Brome
1M0: Dunham
1P0: Eastman
1R0: Brome Lake (Foster)
1S0: Brome Lake (Fulford)
1V0: Brome Lake (Knowlton)
1W0: Lawrenceville
1X0: Potton (Mansonville)
1Y0: Racine, Maricourt
1Z0: Roxton Pond
2A0: Saint-Alphonse-de-Granby
2B0: Sainte-Anne-de-la-Rochelle
2C0: Sainte-Cécile-de-Milton
2E0: Saint-Étienne-de-Bolton
2G0: Saint-Joachim-de-Shefford
2J0: Stukely-Sud
2K0: Sutton
2L0: Valcourt
2M0: Warden
2N0: Waterloo
2P0: Brome Lake (West Brome)
2T0: Bolton-Ouest (West Bolton)

J0G
Bois-Francs-Nord

1A0: Baie-du-Febvre
1B0: Grand-Saint-Esprit
1C0: La Visitation-de-Yamaska
1H0: Odanak
1J0: Pierreville, Saint-Elphège
1K0: Saint-Louis, Massueville, Saint-Aimé
1L0: Saint-David
1M0: Saint-François-du-Lac
1N0: Sainte-Monique
1P0: Saint-Ours
1R0: Saint-Pie-de-Guire
1S0: Saint-Robert
1T0: Sainte-Victoire-de-Sorel
1V0: Saint-Zéphirin-de-Courval
1W0: Yamaska
1X0: Yamaska
1X1: Saint-Gérard-Majella

J0H
Bois-Francs-Sud

1A0: Acton Vale
1B0: La Présentation
1C0: Saint-Bernard-de-Michaudville
1E0: Roxton Falls, Roxton
1E1: Béthanie
1G0: Saint-Barnabé-Sud
1H0: Sainte-Christine
1J0: Saint-Damase
1K0: Saint-Denis-sur-Richelieu
1L0: Saint-Dominique
1M0: Sainte-Hélène-de-Bagot
1N0: Saint-Hugues
1P0: Saint-Jude
1R0: Saint-Liboire
1S0: Sainte-Marie-Madeleine, Sainte-Madeleine
1T0: Saint-Marcel-de-Richelieu
1V0: Saint-Nazaire-d'Acton
1W0: Saint-Pie
1Y0: Saint-Simon (Saint-Simon-de-Bagot)
1Z0: Saint-Théodore-d'Acton
2B0: Saint-Valérien-de-Milton (Saint-Valérien)
2C0: Durham-Sud, Lefebvre
2E0: Upton
2G0: Saint-Charles-sur-Richelieu

J0J
Montérégie-Est

1A0: Bedford
1B0: Noyan, Clarenceville
1C0: Frelighsburg
1E0: Henryville
1G0: Saint-Paul-de-l'Île-aux-Noix
1J0: Lacolle
1K0: Mont-Saint-Grégoire
1L0: Napierville, Saint-Cyprien-de-Napierville
1M0: Notre-Dame-de-Stanbridge
1N0: Philipsburg
1P0: Pike River
1R0: Saint-Jean-sur-Richelieu
1S0: Saint-Alexandre (Saint-Alexandre-d'Iberville)
1T0: Saint-Armand
1V0: Saint-Bernard-de-Lacolle
1W0: Saint-Blaise-sur-Richelieu
1X0: Sainte-Brigide-d'Iberville
1Y0: Saint-Ignace-de-Stanbridge
1Z0: Saint-Jacques-le-Mineur
2B0: Sainte-Sabine
2C0: Saint-Sébastien
2E0: Saint-Valentin
2G0: Sainte-Anne-de-Sabrevois (Sabrevois)
2H0: Stanbridge East
2J0: Stanbridge Station
2K0: Venise-en-Québec

J0K
Lanaudière-Nord

1A0: Berthierville, Sainte-Geneviève-de-Berthier
1B0: Crabtree
1C0: Saint-Ambroise-de-Kildare
1E0: Lanoraie
1K0: Notre-Dame-de-Lourdes (Lourdes-de-Joliette)
1L0: Mandeville
1M0: Manawan
1N0: Maskinongé
1R0: Sainte-Angèle-de-Prémont
1S0: Rawdon
1T0: Saint-Alexis (Saint-Alexis-de-Montcalm)
1V0: Saint-Alexis-des-Monts
1W0: Saint-Alphonse-Rodriguez
1X0: Saint-Barthélemy
1Y0: Sainte-Béatrix
1Z0: Saint-Calixte
2A0: Saint-Cléophas-de-Brandon
2B0: Saint-Côme
2C0: Saint-Cuthbert
2E0: Saint-Damien
2G0: Saint-Didace
2H0: Saint-Édouard-de-Maskinongé
2J0: Sainte-Élisabeth
2K0: Sainte-Émélie-de-l'Énergie
2L0: Saint-Esprit
2M0: Saint-Félix-de-Valois
2N0: Saint-Gabriel, Saint-Gabriel-de-Brandon
2P0: Saint-Ignace-de-Loyola, La Visitation-de-l'Île-Dupas
2R0: Saint-Jacques
2S0: Saint-Jean-de-Matha
2T0: Sainte-Julienne
2V0: Saint-Justin
2W0: Saint-Léon-le-Grand (Saint-Léon)
2X0: Saint-Liguori
2Y0: Sainte-Marcelline-de-Kildare
2Z0: Sainte-Marie-Salomé
3A0: Sainte-Mélanie
3B0: Saint-Michel-des-Saints
3C0: Saint-Norbert
3E0: Saint-Paul
3G0: Saint-Paulin
3H0: Saint-Roch-de-l'Achigan, Saint-Roch-Ouest
3K0: Chertsey
3L0: Saint-Thomas
3M0: Sainte-Ursule
3N0: Saint-Zénon

J0L
Montérégie-Nord

1A0: Calixa-Lavallée
1B0: Kahnawake
1C0: Contrecoeur
1H0: Hemmingford
1M0: Rougemont
1N0: Saint-Amable
1P0: Sainte-Angèle-de-Monnoir
1R0: Saint-Antoine-sur-Richelieu
1T0: Saint-Césaire
1W0: Sainte-Clotilde (Sainte-Clotilde-de-Chateauguay)
1Y0: Saint-Édouard (Saint-Édouard-de-Napierville)
2A0: Saint-Isidore (Saint-Isidore-de-Laprairie)
2B0: Saint-Jean-Baptiste
2E0: Saint-Marc-sur-Richelieu
2H0: Saint-Mathieu (Saint-Mathieu-de-Laprairie)
2J0: Saint-Michel
2K0: Saint-Philippe
2L0: Saint-Rémi
2M0: Saint-Roch-de-Richelieu
2N0: Saint-Patrice-de-Sherrington (Sherrington)
2R0: Verchères

J0M
Nord-du-Québec (Nunavik and Eeyou Istchee)

1A0: Kangirsuk
1C0: Kuujjuaq
1E0: Chisasibi
1G0: Kuujjuarapik
1H0: Ivujivik
1J0: Quaqtaq
1K0: Kangiqsujuaq
1L0: Wemindji
1M0: Inukjuak
1N0: Kangiqsualujjuaq
1P0: Puvirnituq
1R0: Waskaganish
1S0: Salluit
1T0: Tasiujaq
1V0: Akulivik
1W0: Eastmain
1X0: Aupaluk
1Y0: Umiujaq

J0N
Région d'Oka

1E0: Oka, Kanesatake
1G0: Pointe-Calumet
1M0: Saint-Joseph-du-Lac
1P0: Sainte-Marthe-sur-le-Lac

J0P
Vaudreuil-Soulanges

1B0: Coteau-du-Lac
1G0: Dalhousie (Saint-Télesphore)
1H0: Hudson
1J0: Hudson (Hudson Heights)
1M0: Pointe-des-Cascades
1N0: Pointe-Fortune
1P0: Rigaud
1P1: Très-Saint-Rédempteur
1R0: Rivière-Beaudette
1S0: Saint-Clet
1T0: Sainte-Justine-de-Newton
1W0: Sainte-Marthe
1X0: Saint-Polycarpe
1Y0: Saint-Télesphore
1Z0: Saint-Zotique

J0R
Laurentides-Est

1A0: Mille-Isles
1B0: Sainte-Anne-des-Lacs
1H0: Morin-Heights
1K0: Piedmont
1R0-1R7: Saint-Sauveur
1T0: Prévost

J0S
Montérégie-Ouest

1A0: Hinchinbrooke (Athelstan)
1B0: Saint-Anicet (Cazaville)
1C0: Dewittville
1E0: Franklin
1G0: Très-Saint-Sacrement, Howick
1H0: Huntingdon, Godmanchester
1K0: Ormstown
1L0: Dundee (Sainte-Agnes-de-Dundee)
1M0: Saint-Anicet
1N0: Franklin (Saint-Antoine-Abbé)
1P0: Sainte-Barbe
1R0: Saint-Chrysostome
1S0: Saint-Étienne-de-Beauharnois
1T0: Saint-Louis-de-Gonzague
1V0: Sainte-Martine
1W0: Saint-Stanislas-de-Kostka
1Y0: Saint-Urbain-Premier
2C0: Havelock
2E0: Elgin

J0T
Laurentides-Nord

1A0: Arundel, Barkmere
1B0: Brébeuf
1E0: Estérel
1G0: Huberdeau
1H0: Labelle
1J0: Lac-Supérieur
1J3: Mont-Blanc
1K0: Lac-des-Plages
1L0: Ste-Marguerite-du-Lac-Masson
1M0: La Conception
1P0: Lac-Supérieur
1R0: La Macaza
1S0: La Minerve
1T0: Rivière-Rouge
1V0: Lantier
1W0: L'Ascension
1Y0: Wentworth-Nord
2A0: Notre-Dame-de-la-Merci
2B0: Saint-Adolphe-d'Howard
2C0: Saint-Donat (Saint-Donat-de-Montcalm)
2E0: Entrelacs
2G0: Mont-Blanc
2J0: Sainte-Lucie-des-Laurentides
2L0: Amherst
2M0: Lac-des-Seize-Îles
2N0: Val-David
2P0: Val-des-Lacs
2R0: Val-Morin
2T0: Amherst
2V0: Montcalm
2X0: Rivière-Rouge

J0V
Laurentides-Sud

1B0: Grenville-sur-la-Rouge
1E0: Lac-Simon, Chénéville
1G0: Duhamel
1H0: Fassett
1J0: Grenville
1K0: Gore
1L0: Montebello (incl. Notre-Dame-de-Bonsecours)
1M0: Montpellier
1N0: Namur, Boileau
1P0: Notre-Dame-de-la-Paix
1R0: Papineauville
1S0: Plaisance
1V0: Ripon
1W0: Saint-André-Avellin
1X0: Saint-André-d'Argenteuil
1Y0: Saint-Émile-de-Suffolk
2B0: Saint-Placide

J0W
Outaouais-Nord

1A0: Chute-Saint-Philippe
1C0: Ferme-Neuve
1E0: Grand-Remous
1G0: Kiamika
1H0: Lac-des-Écorces
1J0: Saint-Aimé-du-Lac-des-Îles (Lac-des-Îles)
1K0: Lac-Saint-Paul
1L0: Lac-Saguay
1N0: Montcerf-Lytton
1P0: Mont-Saint-Michel
1R0: Nominingue
1S0: Notre-Dame-de-Pontmain
1S1: Lac-du-Cerf
1V0: Sainte-Anne-du-Lac
1W0: Aumond
1Y0: Lac-des-Écorces
2C0: Rapid Lake

J0X
Outaouais-Sud

1A0: La Pêche (Alcove)
1C0: Blue Sea
1E0: Bouchette
1G0: Bristol
1H0: Bryson
1J0: L'Île-du-Grand-Calumet
1K0: Campbell's Bay, Litchfield
1M0: L'Isle-aux-Allumettes, Chapeau, Chichester
1P0: Alleyn-et-Cawood (Danford Lake)
1R0: Mansfield-et-Pontefract (Davidson), (Mansfield)
1S0: La Pêche (Duclos)
1T0: La Pêche (Farrellton)
1V0: Fort-Coulonge
1W0: Gracefield
1X0: Kazabazua
1Y0: Cayamant (Lac-Cayamant)
1Z0: Lac-Sainte-Marie
2A0: Thorne (Ladysmith)
2C0: Low
2G0: Pontiac (Luskville)
2J0: Messines
2L0: Notre-Dame-de-la-Salette
2M0: Notre-Dame-du-Laus
2P0: Otter Lake
2T0: Portage-du-Fort
2V0: Pontiac (Quyon)
2W0: La Pêche (Sainte-Cécile-de-Masham)
2X0: Sainte-Thérèse-de-la-Gatineau
2Y0: Shawville, Clarendon
2Z0: Sheenboro
3B0: Thurso, Lochaber-Partie-Ouest, Saint-Sixte, Lochaber
3C0: Val-des-Bois, Bowman
3E0: Low (Venosta)
3G0: La Pêche (Wakefield)
3H0: Waltham
3K0: La Pêche (Lac des Loups)
3M0: Rapides-des-Joachims

J0Y
Abitibi-Témiscamingue-Est

1A0: Barraute
1C0: Rouyn-Noranda (Cadillac)
1E0: Champneuf
1G0: Amos (Saint-Félix-de-Dalquier)
1H0: Eeyou Istchee James Bay (Desmaraisville)
1J0: Saint-Marc-de-Figuery
1L0: Lac-Chicobi (Guyenne)
1M0: Saint-Mathieu-d'Harricana
1R0: La Corne
1S0: La Morandière-Rochebaucourt (La Morandière)
1T0: La Motte
1V0: Landrienne
1W0: Launay
1X0: Lebel-sur-Quévillon
1Z0: Malartic
2A0: Matagami
2B0: Eeyou Istchee James Bay (Miquelon)
2E0: Preissac
2G0: Berry
2H0: Rivière-Héva
2J0: La Morandière-Rochebaucourt (Rochebaucourt)
2K0: Saint-Dominique-du-Rosaire
2L0: Sainte-Gertrude-Manneville
2M0: Senneterre, Belcourt
2S0: Trécesson
2X0: Eeyou Istchee James Bay (Radisson)
3B0: Nemaska (Nemiscau)
3C0: Waswanipi
3M0: Lac-Simon

J0Z
Abitibi-Témiscamingue-Ouest

1A0: Laverlochère-Angliers (Angliers)
1B0: Rouyn-Noranda (Arntfield)
1C0: Authier
1E0: Authier-Nord
1G0: Béarn
1H0: Eeyou Istchee James Bay (Beaucanton)
1K0: Rouyn-Noranda (Bellecombe)
1L0: Belleterre
1M0: Sainte-Germaine-Boulé
1N0: Chazel
1P0: Rouyn-Noranda (Cléricy)
1R0: Clerval
1S0: Rouyn-Noranda (Cloutier)
1V0: La Reine, Saint-Lambert (Desmeloizes)
1W0: Duparquet
1X0: Dupuy
1Y0: Rouyn-Noranda (Évain)
1Z0: Saint-Édouard-de-Fabre (Fabre)
2A0: Fugèreville
2B0: Gallichan
2E0: Guérin
2G0: Saint-Bruno-de-Guigues
2H0: Kipawa
2J0: Laforce
2K0: Laniel
2L0: La Reine
2N0: Latulipe-et-Gaboury (Latulipe)
2P0: Laverlochère-Angliers (Laverlochère)
2R0: Lorrainville
2S0: Macamic
2T0: Sainte-Hélène-de-Mancebourg (Mancebourg)
2W0: Moffet
2X0: Rouyn-Noranda (Montbeillard)
2Y0: Rouyn-Noranda (Mont-Brun)
2Z0: Nédélec
3A0: Normétal
3B0: Notre-Dame-du-Nord
3C0: Palmarolle
3E0: Poularies
3G0: Rapide-Danseur
3H0: Rémigny
3J0: Rouyn-Noranda
3K0: Roquemaure
3L0: Saint-Eugène-de-Guigues
3M0: Clermont (Saint-Vital-de-Clermont)
3N0: Taschereau
3R0: Témiscaming
3S0: Eeyou Istchee James Bay (Val-Paradis)
3T0: Val-Saint-Gilles
3V0: Eeyou Istchee James Bay (Villebois)

== Most populated FSAs ==
1. J0K, 149,238
2. J0L, 83,316
3. J7V, 69,657
4. J3Y, 66,364
5. J0B, 65,700

== Least populated FSAs ==
1. J5N, 169
2. J9V, 3,409
3. J2E, 4,454
4. J2Y, 5,576
5. J7X, 5,643
