= Sainte-Germaine-Boulé =

- Municipality
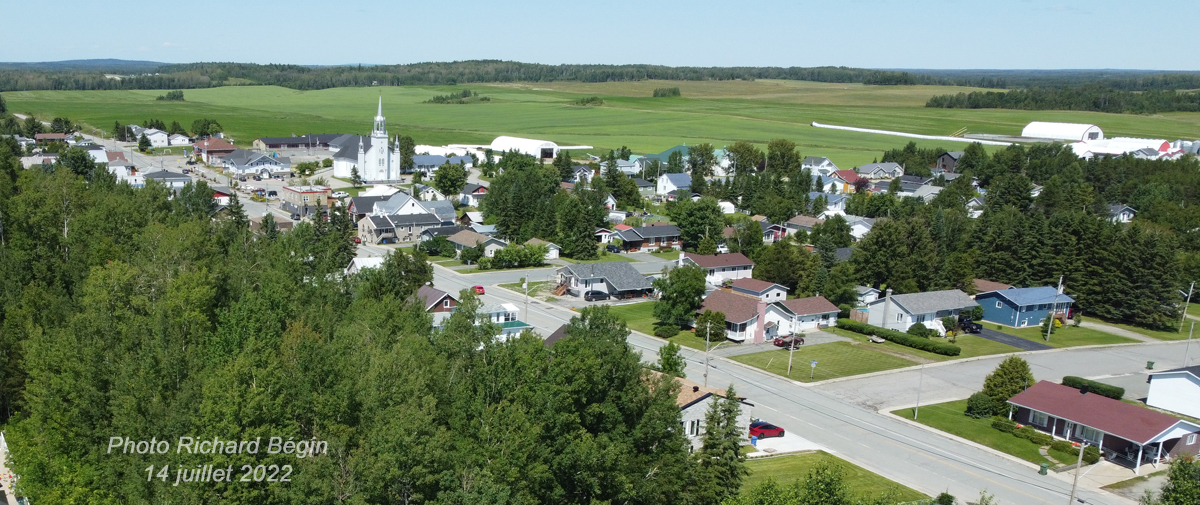
- Aerial view of Sainte-Germaine-Boulé

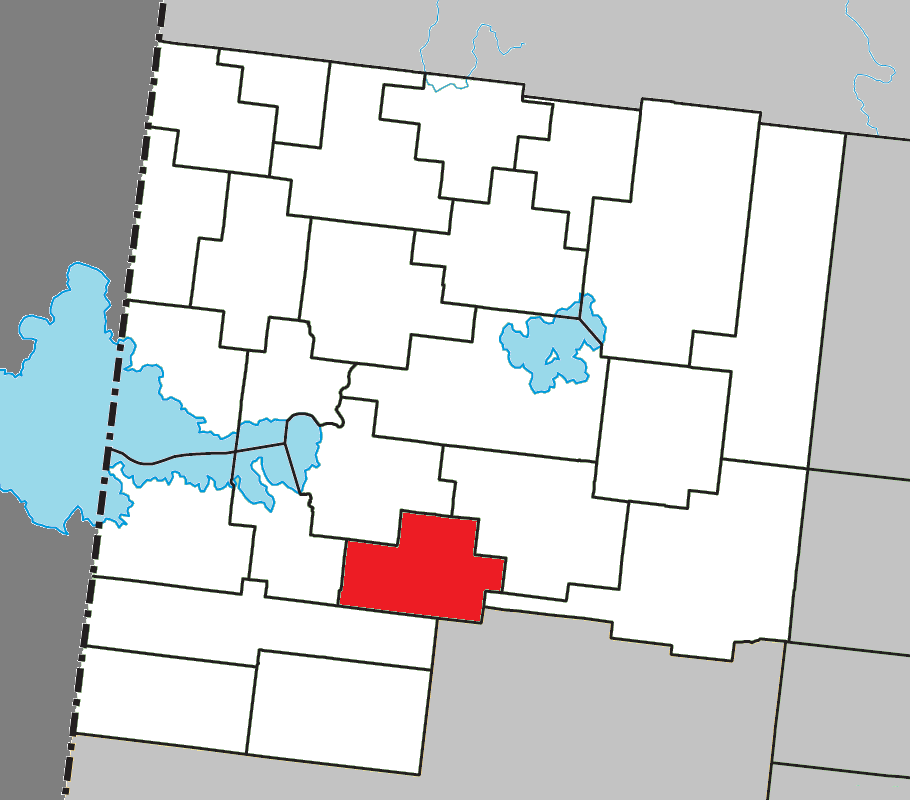
- Location within Abitibi-Ouest RCM

- Location in western Quebec
- Coordinates: 48°36′N 79°07′W
- Country: Canada
- Province: Quebec
- Region: Abitibi-Témiscamingue
- RCM: Abitibi-Ouest
- Settled: 1932
- Constituted: January 1, 1954

Government
  - Mayor: Jaclin Bégin
  - Federal riding: Abitibi—Témiscamingue
  - Prov. riding: Abitibi-Ouest

Area
  - Total: 111.29 km^{2} (42.97 sq mi)
  - Land: 110.04 km^{2} (42.49 sq mi)

Population (2021)
  - Total: 941
  - Density: 8.6/km^{2} (22/sq mi)
  - Pop (2016-21): ▼4.6%
  - Dwellings: 398
- Time zone: UTC−5 (EST)
  - Summer (DST): UTC−4 (EDT)
- Postal code(s): J0Z 1M0
- Area code: 819
- Highways: R-101 R-393
- Website: www.saintegermaineboule.com

Sainte-Germaine-Boulé (French pronunciation: [sɛ̃t ʒɛʁmɛn bule]) is a municipality in northwestern Quebec, Canada, in the Abitibi-Ouest Regional County Municipality. It covers 110.04 square kilometres (42.49 sq mi) and had a population of 941 as of the 2021 Canadian census.

The municipality was incorporated on January 1, 1954.

== History ==
Sainte-Germaine-Boulé was first settled in 1922 when the family of Noël Boucher and Marie Couillard moved in. The sector was still part of the municipality of Palmarolle at the time. The municipality started in 1932 with the arrival of the family of Roméo Drouin, his brother Amédée Drouin and their parents Louis Drouin and Démérise Beaudoin. One year later a visit of Mgr Rhéaume was organized to fix the location of a future church.

The sector continued to develop at a steady pace until 1954 when it officially became its own separate municipality from Palmarolle, as well as by gaining territory from the nearby Poularies. The original name of the new municipality was Sainte-Germaine-de-Palmarolle but it was changed to Sainte-Germaine-Boulé five months later.

== Demographics ==
=== Population ===
Canada census – Sainte-Germaine-Boulé community profile

	2021	2016	2011
Population	941 (-4.6% from 2016)	986 (+10.2% from 2011)	895 (-5% from 2006)
Land area	110.04 km^{2} (42.49 sq mi)	110.33 km^{2} (42.60 sq mi)	11,031 km^{2} (4,259 sq mi)
Population density	8.6/km^{2} (22/sq mi)	8.9/km^{2} (23/sq mi)	8.1/km^{2} (21/sq mi)
Median age	41.1 (M: 40.6, F: 41.6)	40.6 (M: 39.2, F: 42.1)	44.8 (M: 43.9, F: 45.6)
Private dwellings	398 (total) 384 (occupied)	421 (total)	375 (total)
Median household income	$82,000	$67,072	$61,193

References: 2021 2016 2011

Historical census populations – Sainte-Germaine-Boulé

Year	Pop.	±%
1956	1,299	—
1961	1,370	+5.5%
1966	1,276	−6.9%
1971	1,152	−9.7%
1976	1,101	−4.4%
1981	1,058	−3.9%
1986	1,087	+2.7%

Year	Pop.	±%
1991	1,118	+2.9%
1996	1,076	−3.8%
2001	1,005	−6.6%
2006	942	−6.3%
2011	895	−5.0%
2016	986	+10.2%
2021	941	−4.6%

Source: Statistics Canada

Mother tongue (2021):

- English as first language: 0%
- French as first language: 99.5%
- English and French as first language: 0%
- Other as first language: 0%

== Government ==
Municipal council (as of 2023):

- Mayor: Jaclin Bégin
- Councillors: Christine Doré, Mélanie Caron-Croisetière, David Goulet, Frédéric Audet, Marc Vallières, Mélanie Morin

List of former mayors:

- Adélard Turgeon (1954–1956)
- Adrien Gagnon (1956–1962)
- Louis Audet (1962–1973)
- Gérard Paradis (1973–1975)
- Amédée Morin (1975–1979)
- Bernard Jobin (1979–1983)
- Daniel Audet (1983–1986)
- Richard Audet (1986–1997)
- Jaclin Bégin (1997–present)
