= La Vallée-de-la-Gatineau Regional County Municipality =

La Vallée-de-la-Gatineau
- Regional county municipality
- Coordinates: 46°32′N 76°03′W
- Country: Canada
- Province: Quebec
- Region: Outaouais
- Effective: January 1, 1983
- County seat: Gracefield

Government
  - Type: Prefecture
  - Prefect: Chantal Lamarche

Area
  - Total: 13,931.50 km^{2} (5,378.98 sq mi)
  - Land: 12,480.50 km^{2} (4,818.75 sq mi)

Population (2016)
  - Total: 20,182
  - Density: 1.6/km^{2} (4.1/sq mi)
  - Change 2011-2016: ▼1.7%
  - Dwellings: 15,363
- Time zone: UTC−05:00 (EST)
  - Summer (DST): UTC−04:00 (EDT)
- Area code: 819
- Website: www.mrcvg.qc.ca

La Vallée-de-la-Gatineau (French pronunciation: [la vale də la ɡatino], The Valley of the Gatineau) is a regional county municipality in the Outaouais region of western Quebec, Canada. The seat is in Gracefield. It was incorporated on January 1, 1983 and was named for its location straddling the Gatineau River north of Low.

It consists of two cities, fifteen municipalities, and five unorganized territories. The area also has two Algonquin communities, Rapid Lake in the heart of the La Vérendrye Wildlife Reserve and Kitigan Zibi.

The territory of the Gatineau Valley is bordered by other Outaouais RCMs: to the east by the Antoine-Labelle Regional County Municipality, to the southeast by Papineau RCM, to the south by the Les Collines-de-l'Outaouais RCM and to the west by the Pontiac Regional County Municipality. To the north is La Vallée-de-l'Or Regional County Municipality in the Abitibi-Témiscamingue region. Numerous lakes abound in area, including everything from the small Lac des Pins to 31 Mile Lake.

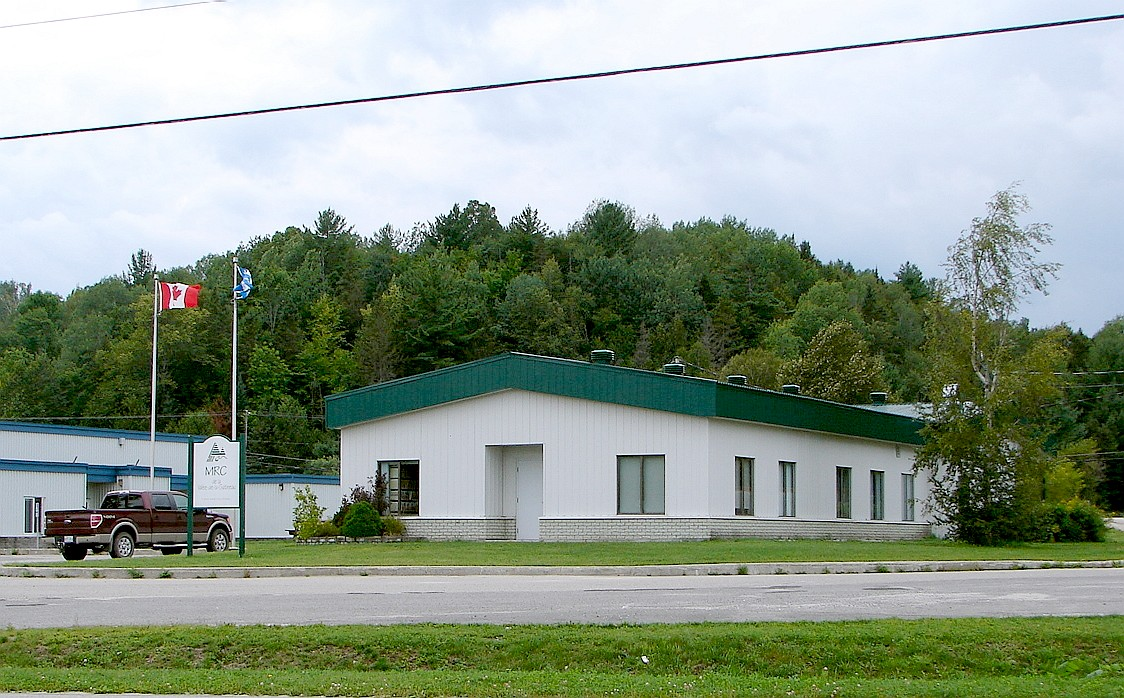
RCM Offices in Gracefield

== Subdivisions ==
There are 22 subdivisions within the RCM:

Cities & Towns (2)

- Gracefield
- Maniwaki

Municipalities (13)

- Blue Sea
- Bois-Franc
- Bouchette
- Cayamant
- Déléage
- Denholm
- Egan-Sud
- Grand-Remous
- Kazabazua
- Lac-Sainte-Marie
- Messines
- Montcerf-Lytton
- Sainte-Thérèse-de-la-Gatineau

Townships (2)

- Aumond
- Low

Unorganized Territory (5)

- Cascades-Malignes
- Dépôt-Échouani
- Lac-Lenôtre
- Lac-Moselle
- Lac-Pythonga

First Nation Reserve (2)
(not associated with RCM)

- Kitigan Zibi
- Rapid Lake

== Transportation ==
=== Access routes ===
Highways and numbered routes that run through the municipality, including external routes that start or finish at the county border:

- Autoroutes
  - None
- Principal highways
  - R-105
  - R-117 (TCH)
  - R-107
- Secondary highways
  - None

== See also ==
- List of regional county municipalities and equivalent territories in Quebec
