= Gallichan =

Municipality in Quebec, Canada

- Municipality
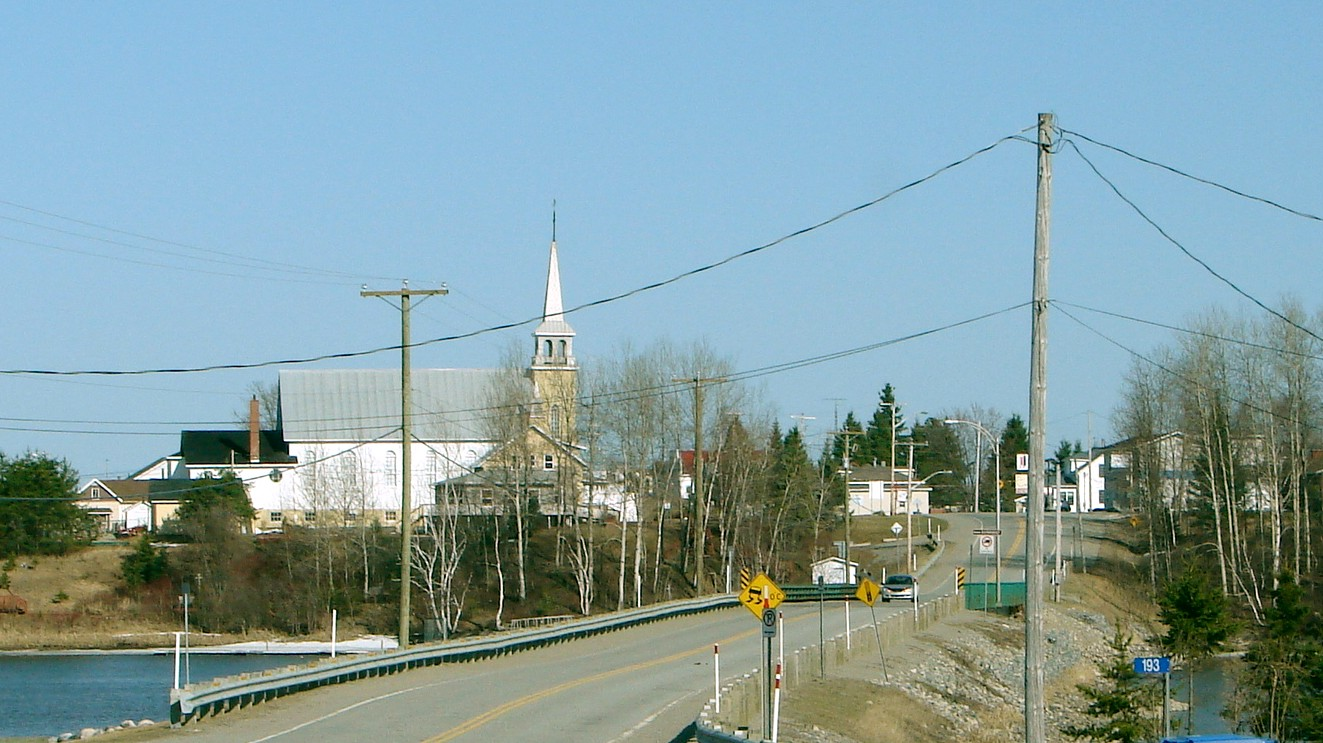
- Motto(s): Deus primus servatus ("God was the first to be saved")
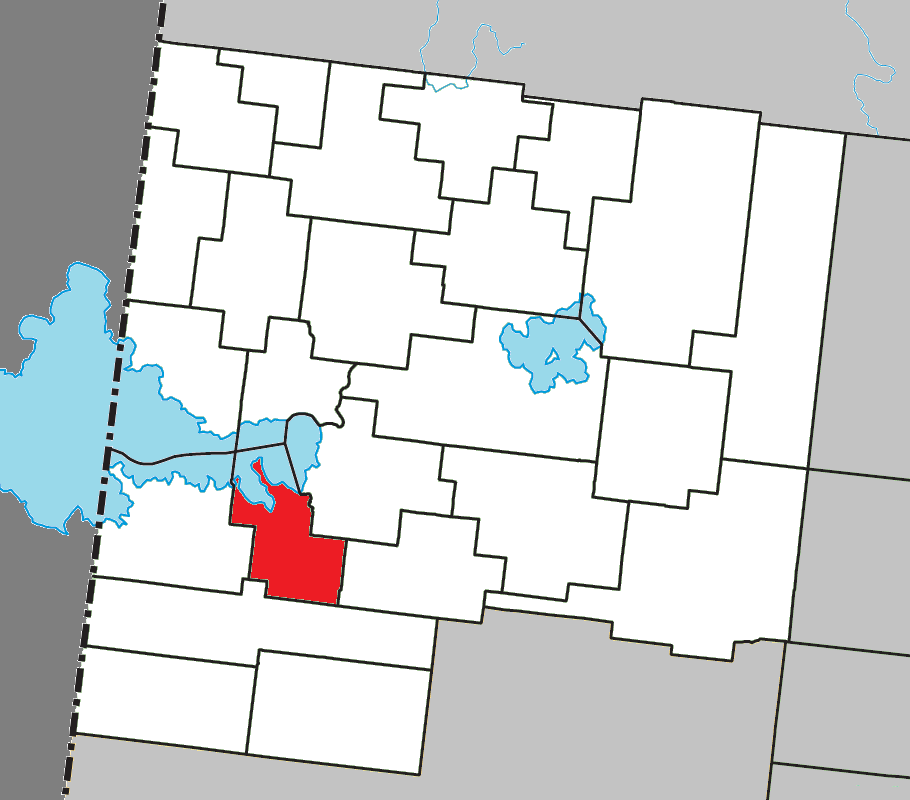
- Location within Abitibi-Ouest RCM

- Location in western Quebec
- Coordinates: 48°36′N 79°17′W
- Country: Canada
- Province: Quebec
- Region: Abitibi-Témiscamingue
- RCM: Abitibi-Ouest
- Settled: 1922
- Constituted: January 1, 1958

Government
  - Mayor: Serge Marquis
  - Federal riding: Abitibi—Témiscamingue
  - Prov. riding: Abitibi-Ouest

Area
  - Total: 98.25 km^{2} (37.93 sq mi)
  - Land: 73.61 km^{2} (28.42 sq mi)

Population (2021)
  - Total: 488
  - Density: 6.6/km^{2} (17/sq mi)
  - Pop (2016-21): ▲4.3%
  - Dwellings: 304
- Time zone: UTC−5 (EST)
  - Summer (DST): UTC−4 (EDT)
- Postal code(s): J0Z 2B0
- Area code: 819
- Highways: No major routes
- Website: gallichan.ao.ca

Gallichan (French pronunciation: [ɡaliʃɑ̃]) is a municipality in northwestern Quebec, Canada, in the Abitibi-Ouest Regional County Municipality located along the banks of the Duparquet River. It had a population of 488 in the 2021 Canadian census.

The municipality was constituted on January 1, 1958, and was called Saint-Laurent until 1986.

== Demographics ==
=== Population ===
Historical census populations – Gallichan

| Year | Pop. | ±% |
|---|---|---|
| 1961 | 672 | — |
| 1966 | 614 | −8.6% |
| 1971 | 482 | −21.5% |
| 1976 | 440 | −8.7% |
| 1981 | 454 | +3.2% |

| Year | Pop. | ±% |
|---|---|---|
| 1986 | 487 | +7.3% |
| 1991 | 482 | −1.0% |
| 1996 | 478 | −0.8% |
| 2001 | 476 | −0.4% |
| 2006 | 458 | −3.8% |

| Year | Pop. | ±% |
|---|---|---|
| 2011 | 484 | +5.7% |
| 2016 | 468 | −3.3% |
| 2021 | 488 | +4.3% |

Source: Statistics Canada

Private dwellings occupied by usual residents (2021): 229 (total dwellings: 304)

=== Language ===
Mother tongue language (2021)

| Language | Population | Pct (%) |
|---|---|---|
| French only | 480 | 99.0% |
| English only | 5 | 1.0% |
| Both English and French | 0 | 0.0% |
| Other languages | 0 | 0.0% |

== Government ==
Municipal council (2024):

- Mayor: Serge Marquis
- Councillors: Richard Vallières, Daniel Bélanger, Nathalie Shink, Jacklin Chabot, Fernand Nadeau, Cynthia Sancartier
