= Déléage =

- Municipality
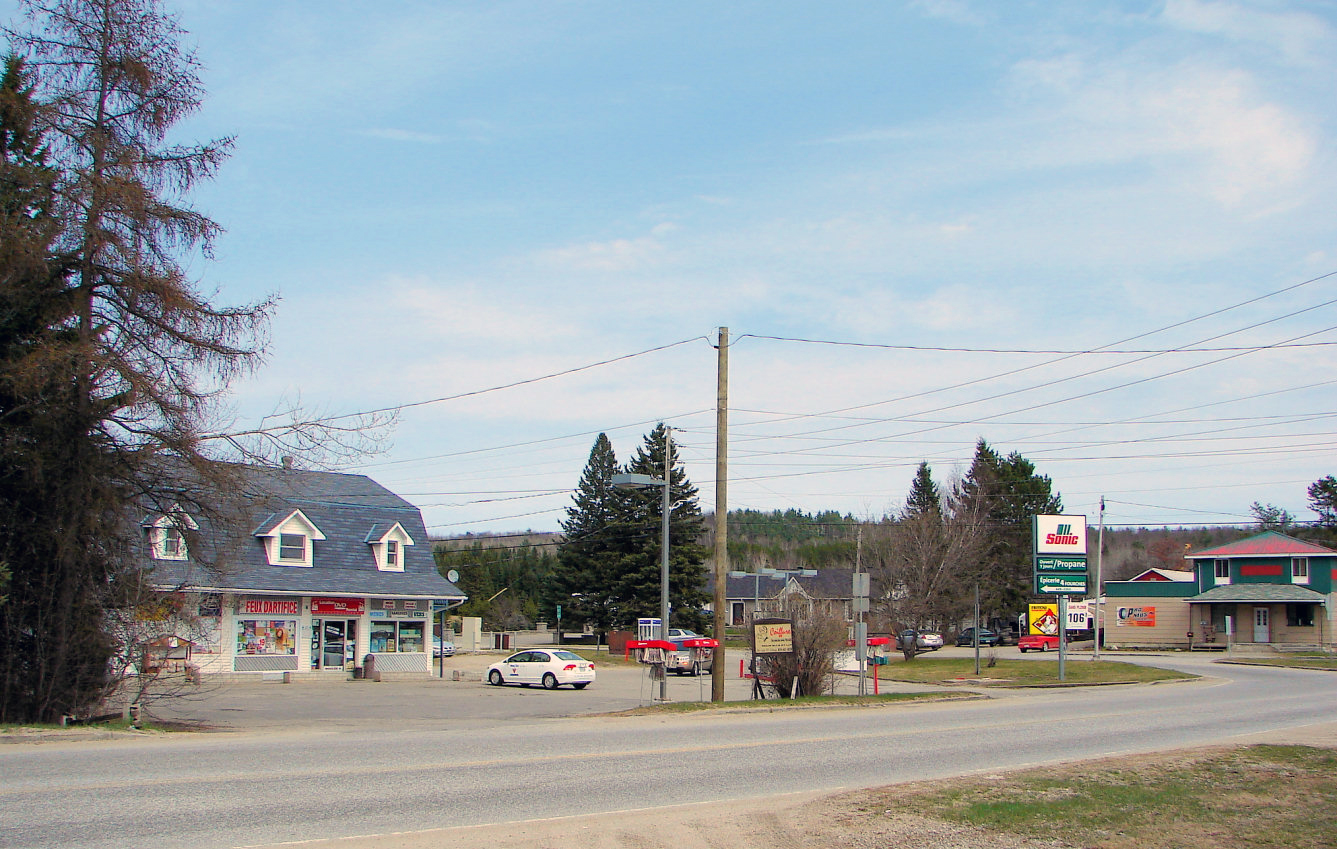

- Location in western Quebec
- Coordinates: 46°23′N 75°55′W
- Country: Canada
- Province: Quebec
- Region: Outaouais
- RCM: La Vallée-de-la-Gatineau
- Constituted: January 1, 1881

Government
  - Mayor: Anne Potvin
  - Federal riding: Pontiac—Kitigan Zibi
  - Prov. riding: Gatineau

Area
  - Total: 263.42 km^{2} (101.71 sq mi)
  - Land: 248.26 km^{2} (95.85 sq mi)

Population (2021)
  - Total: 1,916
  - Density: 7.7/km^{2} (20/sq mi)
  - Pop (2016–21): ▲3.5%
  - Dwellings: 1,021
- Time zone: UTC−5 (EST)
  - Summer (DST): UTC−4 (EDT)
- Postal code(s): J9E 3A8
- Area code: 819
- Website: www.deleage.ca

Déléage (French pronunciation: [deleaʒ]) is a town and municipality in La Vallée-de-la-Gatineau Regional County Municipality, Quebec, Canada. It is situated on the eastern banks of the Gatineau River opposite Maniwaki.

Deleage and Deléage are frequently used alternate spellings. The official spelling was changed from Deleage to Déléage on March 20, 2004.

== History ==
In 1871, the Kensington Township was proclaimed, named after a district of West London, England. In 1881, the Township Municipality of Kensington was formed. In 1930, it was renamed to Déléage, in honour of Jean-Francois-Regis Déléage (1821-1884), born in Haute-Loire and missionary in the Outaouais from 1853 to 1879, where he founded a dozen parishes. His name was also used to identify the post office between 1929 and 1967.

== Demographics ==
Historical census populations – Déléage

Year	Pop.	±%
1976	1,470	—
1981	1,897	+29.0%
1986	1,908	+0.6%
1991	1,921	+0.7%
1996	2,036	+6.0%

Year	Pop.	±%
2001	2,053	+0.8%
2006	1,964	−4.3%
2011	1,856	−5.5%
2016	1,852	−0.2%
2021	1,916	+3.5%

Includes revised count for 2001.
Source: Statistics Canada

Private dwellings occupied by usual residents (2021): 872 (out of 1,021 total)

Languages:

- English as first language: 3%
- French as first language: 94%
- English and French as first language: 1%
- Other as first language: 2%

== Local government ==
List of former mayors:

- Palma Morin (...–2005)
- Jean-Paul Barbe (2005–2013)
- Bernard Cayen (2013–2017)
- Raymond Morin (2017–2021)
- Anne Potvin (2021–present)
