= Lac-Lenôtre =

- Unorganized territory
- Location in western Quebec
- Coordinates: 47°21′N 76°02′W
- Country: Canada
- Province: Quebec
- Region: Outaouais
- RCM: La Vallée-de-la-Gatineau
- Constituted: January 1, 1986

Government
  - Fed. riding: Pontiac—Kitigan Zibi
  - Prov. riding: Gatineau

Area
  - Total: 2,136.25 km^{2} (824.81 sq mi)
  - Land: 1,934.31 km^{2} (746.84 sq mi)

Population (2021)
  - Total: 0
  - Density: 0/km^{2} (0/sq mi)
  - Change (2016–21): N/A
  - Dwellings: 0
- Time zone: UTC−5 (EST)
  - Summer (DST): UTC−4 (EDT)

Lac-Lenôtre (French pronunciation: [lak lənotʁ]) is an unorganized territory in the Outaouais region of Quebec, Canada. It is one of the five unorganized territories in the La Vallée-de-la-Gatineau Regional County Municipality. It is named after Lake Lenôtre.

== Demographics ==
Historical census populations – Lac-Lenôtre
Year	Pop.	±%
1991	0	—
1996	0	0.00%
2001	0	0.00%
2006	0	0.00%
2011	0	0.00%
2016	0	0.00%
2021	0	0.00%
Source: Statistics Canada
