= Bouchette =

- Municipality
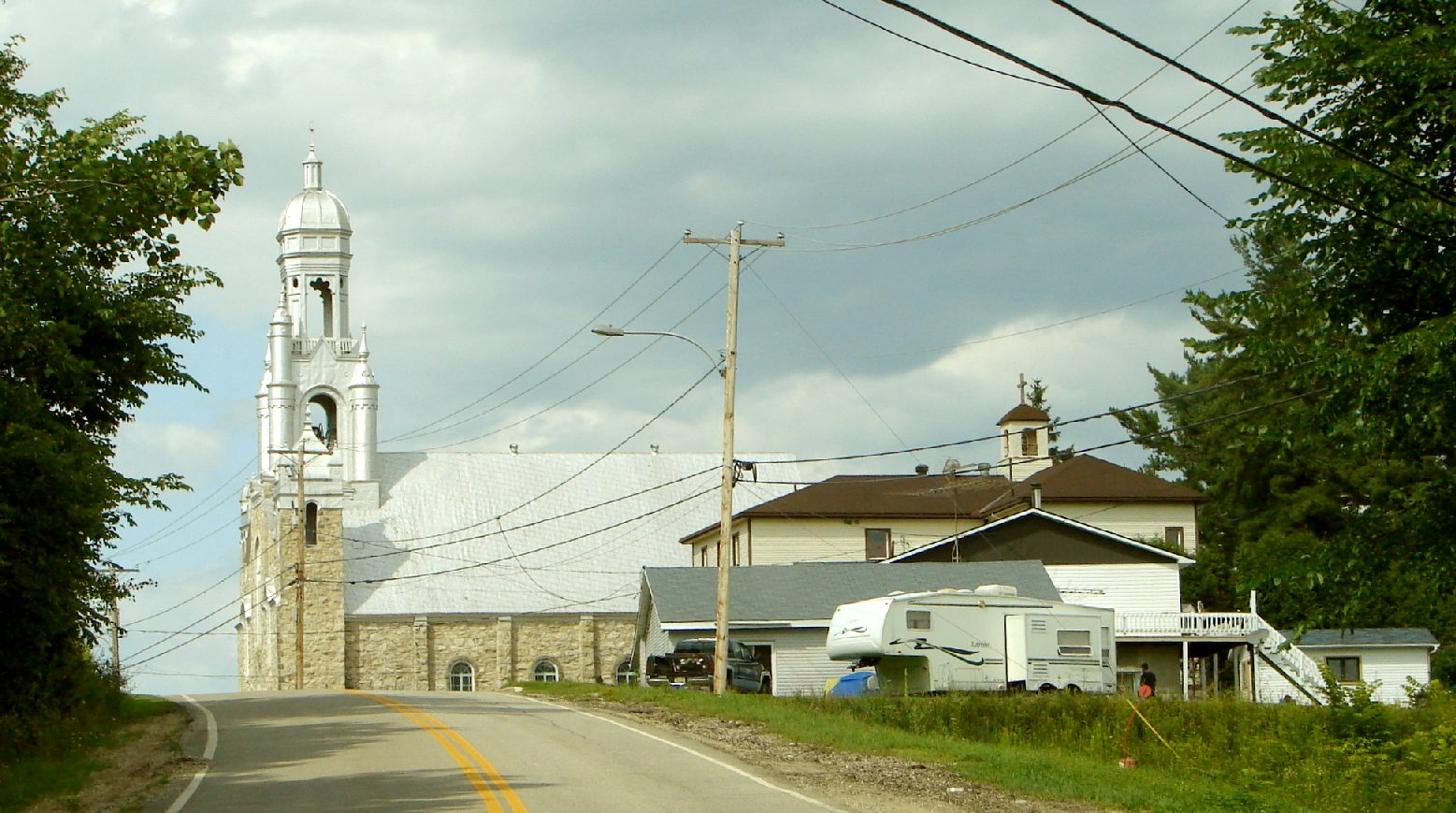

- Location in western Quebec
- Coordinates: 46°13′N 75°58′W
- Country: Canada
- Province: Quebec
- Region: Outaouais
- RCM: La Vallée-de-la-Gatineau
- Constituted: March 22, 1980

Government
  - Mayor: Steve Lefebvre
  - Federal riding: Pontiac—Kitigan Zibi
  - Prov. riding: Gatineau

Area
  - Total: 143.21 km^{2} (55.29 sq mi)
  - Land: 122.09 km^{2} (47.14 sq mi)

Population (2021)
  - Total: 695
  - Density: 5.7/km^{2} (15/sq mi)
  - Pop (2016–21): ▼4.9%
  - Dwellings: 629
- Time zone: UTC−5 (EST)
  - Summer (DST): UTC−4 (EDT)
- Postal code(s): J0X 1E0
- Area code: 819
- Website: www.bouchette.ca

Bouchette (French pronunciation: [buʃɛt]) is a municipality in the geographic centre of the La Vallée-de-la-Gatineau Regional County Municipality, Quebec, Canada, 75 kilometres (47 mi) north of Gatineau. Its territory is along the shores of Gatineau River and western Thirty-One Mile Lake.

Agriculture is an important economic activity, along with outdoor tourism. It has less than 700 residents but approximately 1075 cottage owners.

There is a variety of services in Bouchette: school, post office, municipal services, grocery and hardware stores, restaurants, accommodation, construction contractors, camping.

== History ==
The Bouchette Township was proclaimed in 1858 and the Township Municipality was formed in 1872. It was named in honour of Surveyor General of Lower Canada Joseph Bouchette (1774–1841).

The township of Cameron between the Gatineau River and Thirty-One Mile Lake was proclaimed in 1854 and named in honour of Canadian businessman and politician Malcolm Cameron.

In 1980, the townships of Bouchette and Cameron merged, forming the new Municipality of Bouchette.

== Demographics ==
Historical census populations – Bouchette

Year	Pop.	±%
1976	760	—
1981	689	−9.3%
1986	699	+1.5%
1991	688	−1.6%
1996	722	+4.9%

Year	Pop.	±%
2001	701	−2.9%
2006	718	+2.4%
2011	786	+9.5%
2016	731	−7.0%
2021	695	−4.9%

Source: Statistics Canada

Private dwellings occupied by usual residents (2021): 347 (out of 629 total)

Languages:

- French as first language: 81%
- English as first language: 19%

== Local government ==
List of former mayors:

- Réjean Carle (...–2009)
- Réjean Major (2009–2017)
- Gilles Bastien (2017–2021)
- Steve Lefebvre (2021–present)
