= Champneuf =

- Municipality
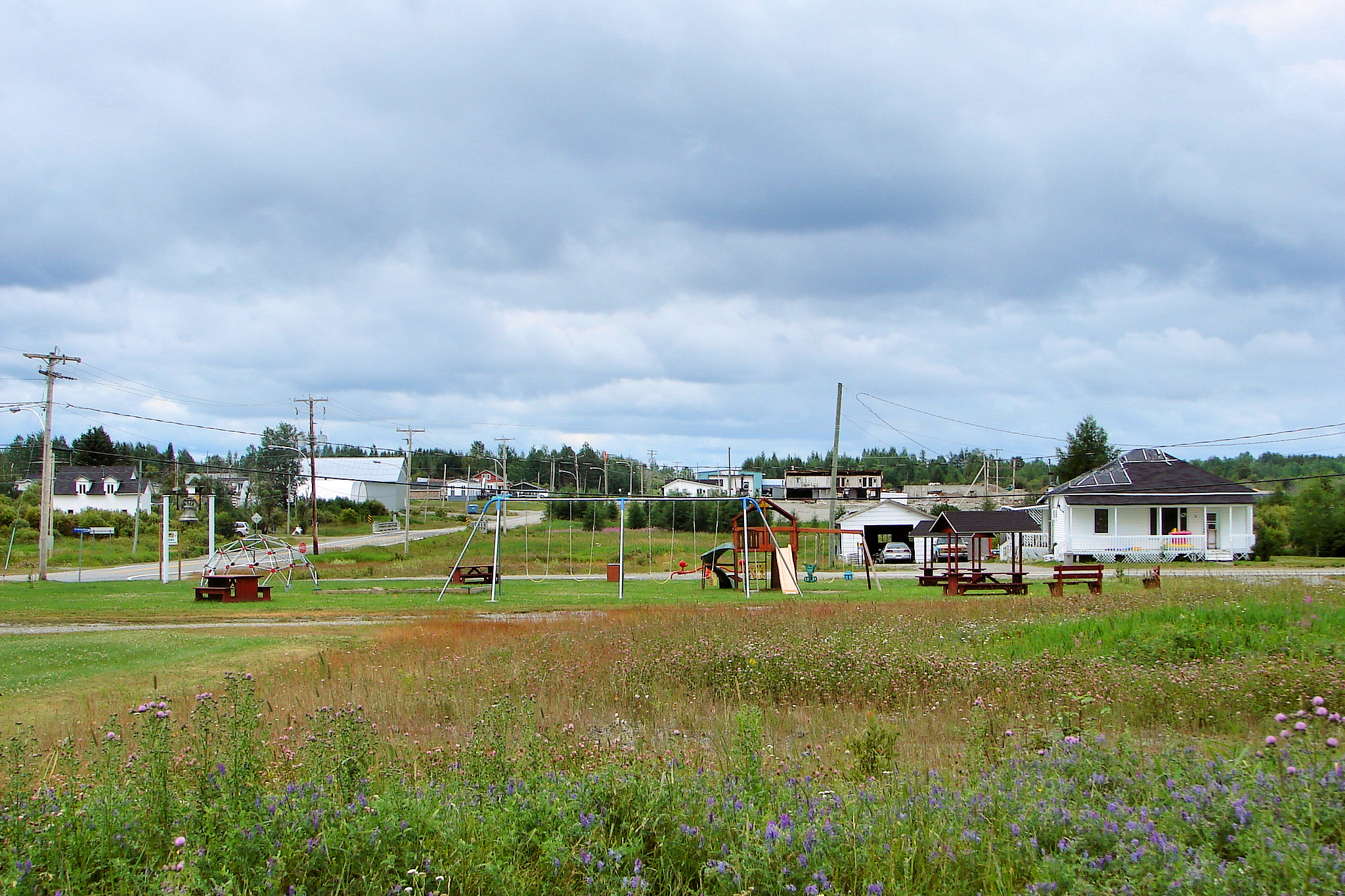

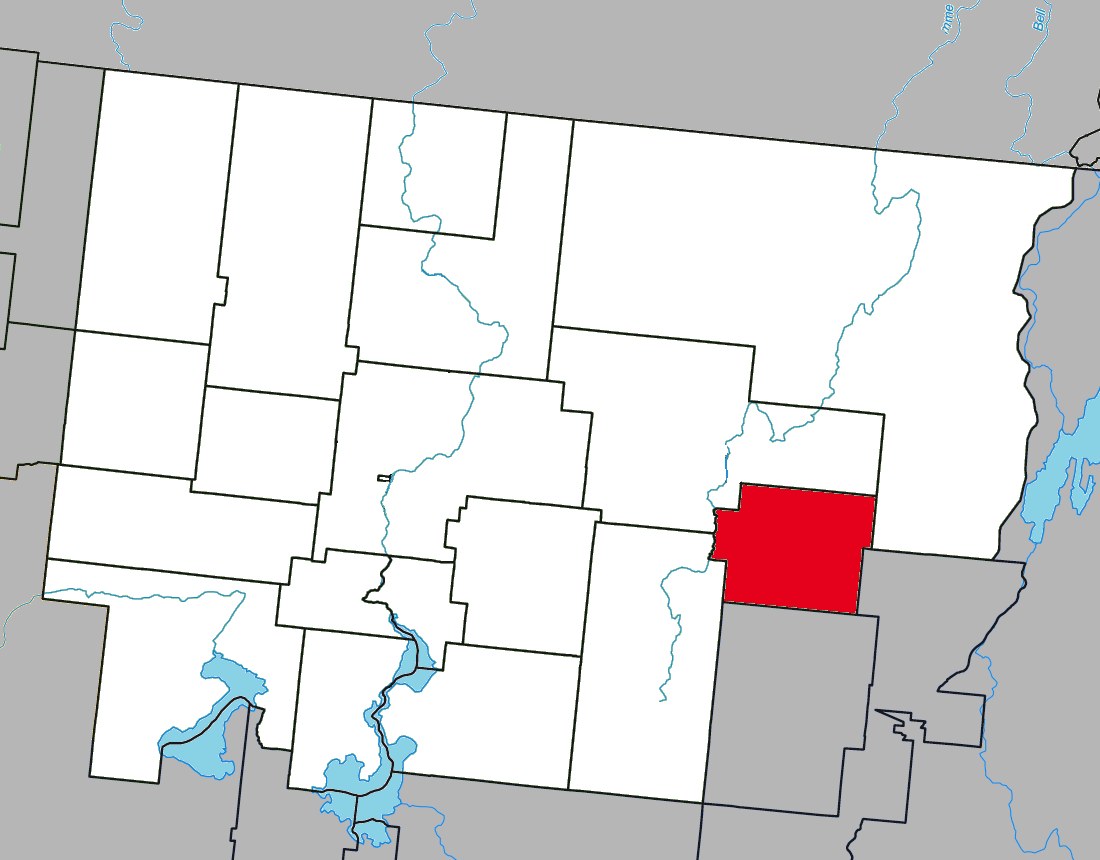
- Location within Abitibi RCM

- Location in western Quebec
- Coordinates: 48°35′N 77°30′W
- Country: Canada
- Province: Quebec
- Region: Abitibi-Témiscamingue
- RCM: Abitibi
- Settled: 1938
- Constituted: January 1, 1964

Government
  - Mayor: Rosaire Guénette
  - Federal riding: Abitibi—Témiscamingue
  - Prov. riding: Abitibi-Ouest

Area
  - Total: 242.73 km^{2} (93.72 sq mi)
  - Land: 241.32 km^{2} (93.17 sq mi)

Population (2021)
  - Total: 94
  - Density: 0.4/km^{2} (1.0/sq mi)
  - Pop (2016-21): ▼23.6%
  - Dwellings: 54
- Time zone: UTC−05:00 (EST)
  - Summer (DST): UTC−04:00 (EDT)
- Postal code(s): J0Y 1E0
- Area code: 819
- Highways: No major routes
- Website: www.champneuf.ca

Champneuf (French pronunciation: [ʃɑ̃nœf]) is a municipality in the Canadian province of Quebec, located in the Abitibi Regional County Municipality. It is the least populated incorporated place in the Abitibi-Témiscamingue region.

== History ==
In 1938, the settlement was founded, first called Colonie Bertrand, after its first parish priest Achille-Augustin Bertrand. In 1941, it was renamed to Champneufs (French for "new fields"), but also known by the parish name of Saint-François-d'Assise-de-Champneufs during the 1950s. At one point and for unknown reasons, the name was changed from the plural to the singular Champneuf. In 1964, the place was incorporated as a municipality.

== Demographics ==
Historical census populations – Champneuf

Year	Pop.	±%
1966	563	—
1971	386	−31.4%
1976	287	−25.6%
1981	252	−12.2%
1986	231	−8.3%
1991	187	−19.0%

Year	Pop.	±%
1996	169	−9.6%
2001	157	−7.1%
2006	130	−17.2%
2011	127	−2.3%
2016	123	−3.1%
2021	94	−23.6%

Source: Statistics Canada

Private dwellings occupied by usual residents (2021): 48 (total dwellings: 54)

Mother tongue (2021):

- English as first language: 5.3%
- French as first language: 94.7%
- English and French as first language: 0%
- Other as first language: 0%

== Climate ==
Climate type is dominated by the winter season, a long, cold period with short, clear days, relatively little precipitation mostly in the form of snow, and low humidity. The Köppen climate classification subtype for this climate is "Dfc"(Continental Subarctic Climate).

== Government ==
Municipal council (as of 2023):

- Mayor: Rosaire Guénette
- Councillors: Sonia Marcotte, Lyne Leduc, Léopold Leduc, Nancy Guénette, Manon Beaudet, Stéphane Leduc

=== Political representation ===
Champneuf federal election results
Year	Liberal		Conservative		Bloc Québécois		New Democratic		Green	
2021	34%	32	20%	18	35%	32	3%	2	0%	0
2019	28%	19	21%	14	43%	28	6%	4	2%	1

Champneuf provincial election results
Year	CAQ		Liberal		QC solidaire		Parti Québécois	
2018	51%	42	15%	12	4%	4	29%	24
2014	17%	13	38%	29	2%	1	43%	32

Provincially it is part of the riding of Abitibi-Ouest. In the 2022 Quebec general election the incumbent MNA Suzanne Blais, of the Coalition Avenir Québec, was re-elected to represent the population of Champneuf in the National Assembly of Quebec.

Federally, Champneuf is part of the federal riding of Abitibi—Témiscamingue. In the 2021 Canadian federal election, the incumbent Sébastien Lemire of the Bloc Québécois was re-elected to represent the population Champneuf in the House of Commons of Canada.
