= Wickham, Quebec =

Wickham
- Municipality
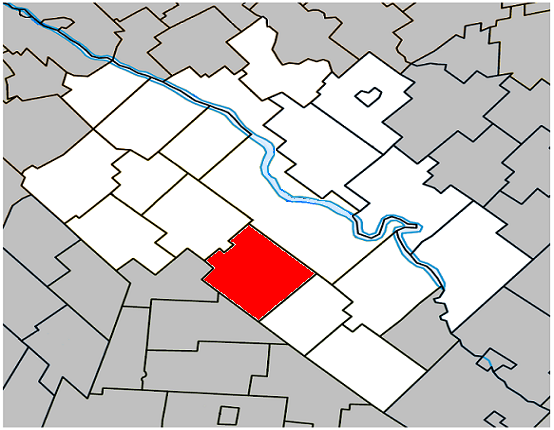
- Location within Drummond RCM.

- Location in southern Quebec.
- Coordinates: 45°45′N 72°30′W
- Country: Canada
- Province: Quebec
- Region: Centre-du-Québec
- RCM: Drummond
- Constituted: December 23, 1972

Government
  - Mayor: Luce Daneau
  - Federal riding: Drummond
  - Prov. riding: Marie-Lacoste-Gérin-Lajoie

Area
  - Total: 99.10 km^{2} (38.26 sq mi)
  - Land: 98.75 km^{2} (38.13 sq mi)

Population (2011)
  - Total: 2,470
  - Density: 25/km^{2} (65/sq mi)
  - Pop 2006-2011: ▼1.3%
  - Dwellings: 994
- Time zone: UTC−5 (EST)
  - Summer (DST): UTC−4 (EDT)
- Postal code(s): J0C 1S0
- Area code: 819
- Highways: R-139
- Website: www.wickham.ca

Wickham (French pronunciation: [wikam]) is a municipality located in the Centre-du-Québec region of Quebec. The population as of the Canada 2011 Census was 2,470.

== Demographics ==
=== Population ===
Population trend:

Census	Population	Change (%)
2011	2,470	▼1.3%
2006	2,503	▼0.5%
2001	2,516	▲5.9%
1996	2,376	▲8.4%
1991	2,191	N/A

=== Language ===
Mother tongue language (2006)

Language	Population	Pct (%)
French only	2,415	96.79%
English only	10	0.40%
Both English and French	0	0.00%
Other languages	70	2.81%

== See also ==
- List of municipalities in Quebec
