= Saint-Lambert, Abitibi-Témiscamingue =

Saint-Lambert
- Parish municipality
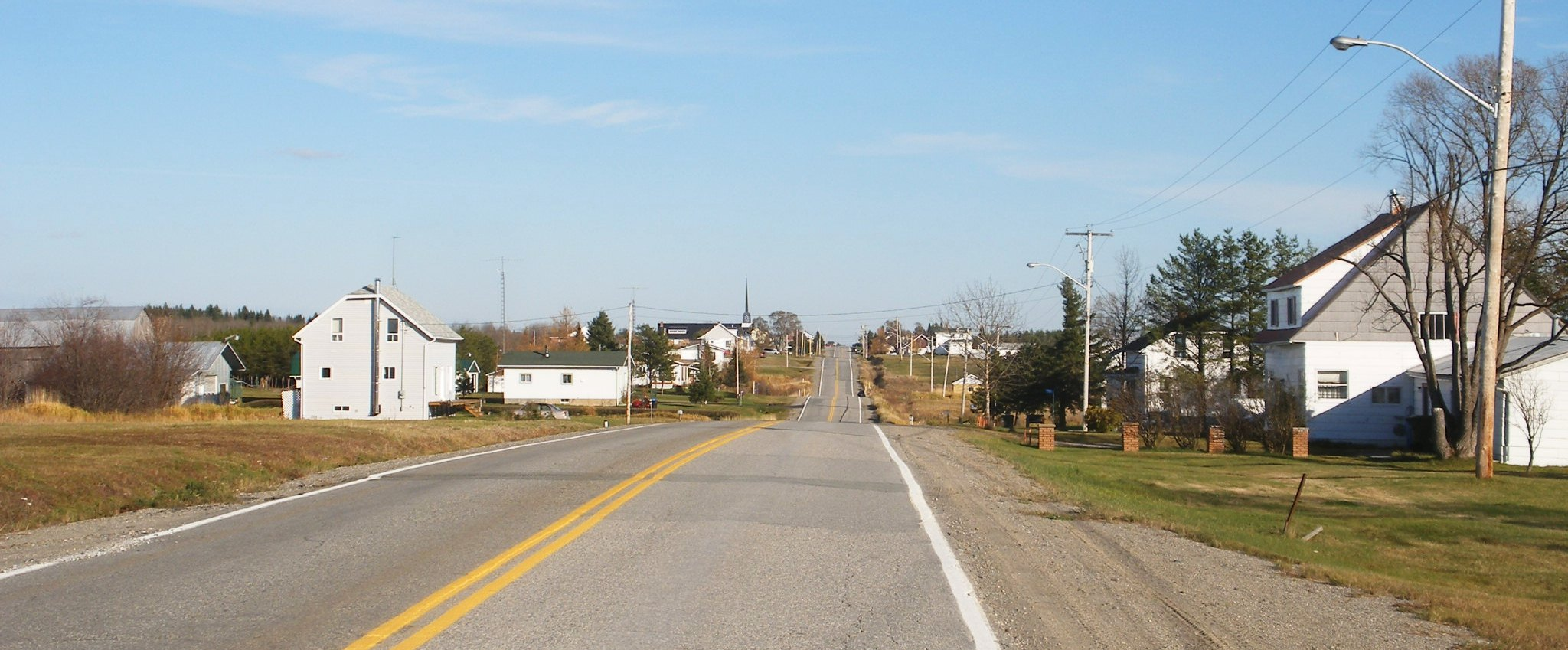

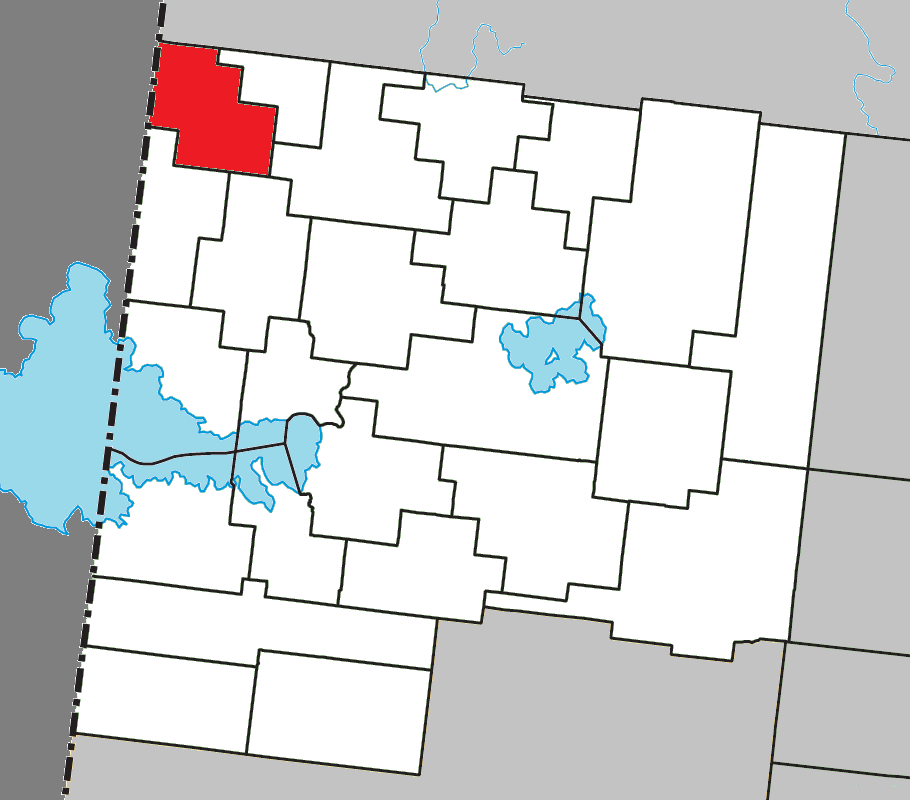
- Location within Abitibi-Ouest RCM

- Location in western Quebec
- Coordinates: 48°57′N 79°28′W
- Country: Canada
- Province: Quebec
- Region: Abitibi-Témiscamingue
- RCM: Abitibi-Ouest
- Settled: 1922
- Constituted: May 14, 1938

Government
  - Mayor: Diane Provost
  - Federal riding: Abitibi—Témiscamingue
  - Prov. riding: Abitibi-Ouest

Area
  - Total: 101.30 km^{2} (39.11 sq mi)
  - Land: 99.81 km^{2} (38.54 sq mi)

Population (2021)
  - Total: 191
  - Density: 1.9/km^{2} (4.9/sq mi)
  - Pop (2016-21): ▼1.5%
  - Dwellings: 95
- Time zone: UTC−05:00 (EST)
  - Summer (DST): UTC−04:00 (EDT)
- Postal code(s): J0Z 1V0
- Area code: 819
- Highways: No major routes
- Website: st-lambert.ao.ca

Saint-Lambert (French pronunciation: [sɛ̃ lɑ̃bɛʁ], locally [sɛ̃ lɑ̃baɛ̯ʁ]) is a parish municipality in northwestern Quebec, Canada, in the Abitibi-Ouest Regional County Municipality. It had a population of 191 in the 2021 Canadian census. The municipality was incorporated on May 14, 1938.

== Demographics ==
In the 2021 Census of Population conducted by Statistics Canada, Saint-Lambert had a population of 191 living in 89 of its 95 total private dwellings, a change of −1.5% from its 2016 population of 194. With a land area of 99.81 km^{2} (38.54 sq mi), it had a population density of 1.9/km^{2} (5.0/sq mi) in 2021.

Canada census – Saint-Lambert community profile

	2021	2016	2011
Population	191 (-1.5% from 2016)	194 (-8.1% from 2011)	211 (-5.0% from 2006)
Land area	99.81 km^{2} (38.54 sq mi)	100.23 km^{2} (38.70 sq mi)	100.88 km^{2} (38.95 sq mi)
Population density	1.9/km^{2} (4.9/sq mi)	1.9/km^{2} (4.9/sq mi)	2.1/km^{2} (5.4/sq mi)
Median age	54.0 (M: 58.0, F: 50.4)	51.0 (M: 52.0, F: 49.0)	47.7 (M: 48.5, F: 46.0)
Private dwellings	95 (total)	93 (total)	92 (total)
Median household income	$.N/A	$.N/A	$.N/A

Notes: Income data for this area has been suppressed for data quality or confidentiality reasons.
References: 2021 2016 2011

Historical census populations – Saint-Lambert, Abitibi-Témiscamingue

Year	Pop.	±%
1941	384	—
1951	665	+73.2%
1956	770	+15.8%
1961	705	−8.4%
1966	673	−4.5%
1971	628	−6.7%
1976	471	−25.0%
1981	381	−19.1%

Year	Pop.	±%
1986	296	−22.3%
1991	305	+3.0%
1996	268	−12.1%
2001	251	−6.3%
2006	222	−11.6%
2011	211	−5.0%
2016	194	−8.1%
2021	191	−1.5%

Source: Statistics Canada

=== Language ===
Canada Census Mother Tongue Language - Saint-Lambert, Abitibi-Témiscamingue, Quebec
Census	Total	French			English			French & English			Other		
Year	Responses	Count	Trend	Pop %	Count	Trend	Pop %	Count	Trend	Pop %	Count	Trend	Pop %
2021	195	185	▲2.8%	94.9%	5	0.0%	2.6%	0	▼100.0%	0.0%	0	0.0%	0.0%
2016	195	180	▼14.3%	92.3%	5	▲ n/a%	2.6%	5	▲ n/a%	2.6%	0	0.0%	0.0%
2011	210	210	0.0%	100.0%	0	0.0%	0.0%	0	0.0%	0.0%	0	0.0%	0.0%
2006	210	210	▼16.7%	100.0%	0	0.0%	0.0%	0	▼100.0%	0.0%	0	0.0%	0.0%
2001	255	245	▼10.9%	96.1%	0	0.0%	0.0%	10	0.0%	3.9%	0	0.0%	0.0%
1996	285	275	n/a	96.5%	0	n/a	0.0%	10	n/a	3.5%	0	n/a	0.0%

== Government ==
Municipal council (as of 2023):

- Mayor: Diane Provost
- Councillors: Micheline Gagné, Stéphane Godbout, Manon Fluet, Clément Melançon, Claude Garant, Marcel Moreau

List of former mayors:

- Marco Morin (...–2010)
- Émilien Rivard (2010–2013)
- Diane Provost (2013–present)

== See also ==
- List of parish municipalities in Quebec
