= Area codes 819, 873, and 468 =

Area codes for Quebec, Canada

Coordinates: 52.384°N 74.846°W

Area codes 819, 873, and 468 are overlay telephone area codes in the North American Numbering Plan (NANP) for central and western Quebec, Canada, including the Quebec portion of the National Capital Region, and the Hudson Strait and Ungava Bay coastlines of Quebec. Major cities in the territory include Gatineau, Sherbrooke, Trois-Rivières, Drummondville, Shawinigan, Victoriaville, Rouyn-Noranda, Val-d'Or, Magog and Mont-Laurier.

The incumbent local exchange carriers for the numbering plan area are Bell Canada, Bell Aliant, Telus, as well as Télébec and other independent companies. From 1992 to 1997, Northwestel was also an incumbent carrier in 819, as it included former Bell Canada areas in the Northwest Territories.

== History ==
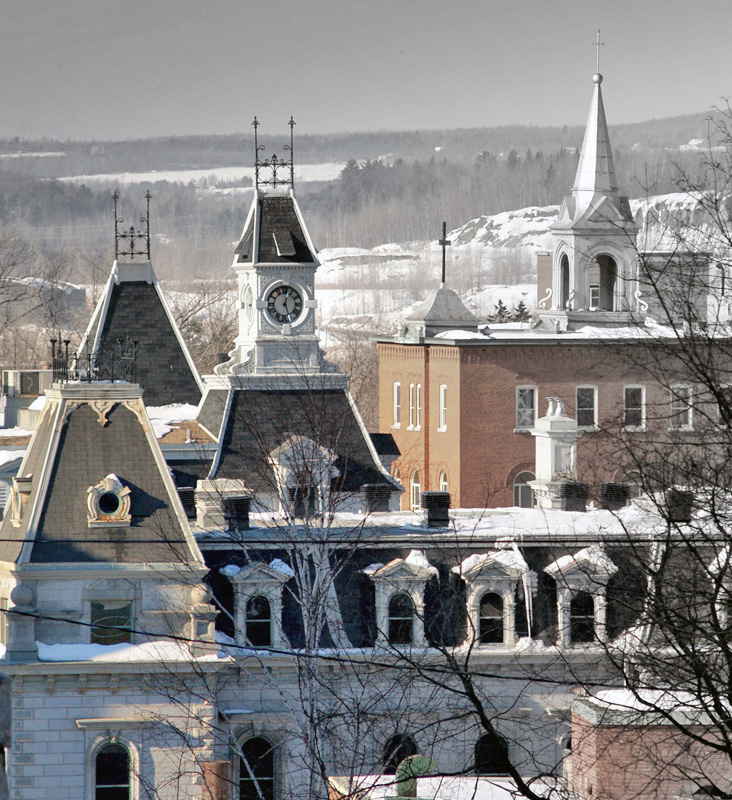
Sherbrooke, Québec

Ontario and Quebec were the only Canadian provinces that received assignments of multiple area codes from the American Telephone and Telegraph Company (AT&T) when the original North American area codes were created in 1947.

The eastern part of Quebec received area code 418, while the western part, from the US border to Hudson Strait, was assigned area code 514. After assignment of area code 819 in 1956, a 1957 flash cut split the 514 area into three segments. The southern region (including Montreal) retained 514; the middle region received 819, and the northern region, which had no telephone services, was added to 418.

Area code 819 thus bordered area code 613 and the new area code 705 in Ontario, area code 418 in the east and the north of Quebec, and the remainder of area code 514 in the south of Quebec.

When telephone service was introduced in the eastern Northwest Territories (most of which is now the territory of Nunavut, created in 1999), in Frobisher Bay in 1958, Bell Canada nominally made it part of area code 418. In the 1960s and the 1970s, telephone service was introduced by Bell Canada at other locations in the eastern Northwest Territories and along the Quebec Arctic coastline, as well as by Sotel, an independent company, in the James Bay region. Those non-diallable locations also became part of area code 418.

In the late 1970s, the northern parts of area code 418 served by Sotel and Bell along James, Hudson and Ungava Bays and Hudson Strait, as well as the eastern Northwest Territories, were assigned to area code 819 as exchanges in that area began to receive direct distance dialling. Thus, area code 819 now also bordered area code 709 of Newfoundland in the Torngat Mountain area and area code 403 where Bell Canada and Northwestel service areas met, as well as area code 204 (Manitoba) and area code 807 (northwestern Ontario). Also, from the late 1970s to 1997, area code 819 extended one eighth of the way around the world, from the 45th parallel north at Stanstead, Quebec, to the North Pole, including much of the Northwest Territories along with most of western Quebec. Northwestel used Alberta's area code 403 for its services in Yukon and the Northwest Territories.

In 1997 and 1998, the portions of 819 in the Northwest Territories, as well as the portions of 403 in the Northwest Territories and Yukon, were transferred to area code 867, which was newly created to unite all of the Canadian territories, including Nunavut. Area code 819 was cut back to western Quebec, and area code 403 was reduced to serve only Alberta. Thus, borders with area codes 403, 204, and 807 were replaced with the single border on area code 867. Area code 514 was split shortly afterward, which changed area code's 819's border with 514 to a boundary with Area code 450, the new area code for the off-island suburbs of Montreal.

Until 2006, it was possible to make calls between Ottawa and Hull with only seven digits since Ottawa and Hull are a single local calling area. Central office code protection prevented the same seven-digit local number from being assigned in both Ottawa and Hull; thus if an exchange in 819-77x (819-PRovince) was in use in Hull, the corresponding 1-613-77x exchange could not be used anywhere in Eastern Ontario. Conversely, if an exchange in 613-23x was used in Ottawa, the corresponding 819-23x exchange could not be used anywhere in western Quebec, even in areas a safe distance from the National Capital Region such as Mauricie and Estrie.

In Canada, even tiny hamlets are a rate centres, with multiple competitive local exchange carriers being issued 10,000-number blocks, each of which corresponds to a single three-digit prefix. Larger cities had multiple rate centres, most of which were not amalgamated during the creation of "megacities" in Quebec in 2002 and still remain separate. For instance, Hull was in 2002 merged into the "megacity" of Gatineau. However, the megacity is split between five rate centres which have never been amalgamated. The city centre exchange (serving the former cities of Hull and Pointe-Gatineau) is still named "Ottawa-Hull", while the "Gatineau" exchange serves only the pre-merger city of Gatineau. Local calling was not possible between some portions of the megacity of Gatineau for some years after the amalgamation. For example, the Gatineau and Aylmer rate centres were long-distance calls to each other until a 16 August 2007 expansion of their local calling areas, five years after the merger. Redundant telephone exchange rate centres are not merged when the underlying municipalities are amalgamated.

Many smaller rate centres do not need anywhere near 10,000 numbers to serve their customers. However, Canada does not use number pooling as a relief measure. A number cannot be assigned elsewhere once it has been allocated to a carrier and rate centre, even when a smaller rate centre has more than enough numbers to serve it. This resulted in thousands of "wasted" numbers. The exchange protection scheme and the proliferation of cell phones and pagers further exacerbated the problem. By 2006, area code 819 was effectively exhausted except for central office codes that theoretically could have been assigned in the former Hull but only by breaking seven-digit dialling between Ottawa and Hull.

Ten-digit dialling became mandatory in both area codes, 819 and 613, on October 21, 2006, and exchange protection was largely ended. Seven-digit local calls in centres far from the area code boundary (such as Trois-Rivières and Belleville, with no local calling into any other area code at the time) were failing, with intercept messages demanding customers to "dial the area code".

The only legacy of the old system is a "dual dialability" scheme for federal government numbers in the National Capital Region. Years earlier, federal government offices on the Quebec side duplicated their entire allocation of multiple exchanges on the Ontario side.

The end of exchange protection was intended to allow number blocks to be assigned in the National Capital Region that could not previously be assigned under the previous system. However, within five years, it became clear that ending exchange protection would not free up enough numbers on either side of the Ottawa River to meet demand. Originally to be introduced in 2015, the CRTC on July 20, 2011 brought forward the introduction of the new area code 873 to September 15, 2012 after a report stated that the current area code 819 would be exhausted by then. Area code 873 had never been assigned as a local exchange in 1-819 because the tiny border village Beebe Plain is divided between 1-819-876 Rock Island and 1-802-873 Derby Line, an international local call that had been given exchange code protection to permit seven-digit local dialling.

In February 2017, area code 468 was reserved as a third area code in the region. This area code became active on October 20, 2022.

== Service areas ==
- Akulivik – (819) 496
- Alleyn-et-Cawood – see Kazabazua
- Amherst – see Mont-Tremblant
- Amos – (819) 218, 442, 443, 444, 480, 724, 727, 732, 830, 834, 954 (873) 393, 560, 730, 840, 999
- Arundel – see Harrington
- Ascot Corner – see Sherbrooke
- Aston-Jonction – (819) 226, 256
- Audet – see Lac-Mégantic
- Aumond – see Maniwaki
- Aupaluk – (819) 491
- Austin – see Magog
- Authier – see Macamic
- Authier-Nord – see Macamic
- Ayer's Cliff – (819) 838, 867
- Barkmere – see Mont-Tremblant
- Barnston-Ouest – see Ayer's Cliff
- Barraute – (819) 733, 734
- Béarn – (819) 726
- Bécancour – (819) 233, 294, 297, 298, 406, 407, 589, 591, 602, 606, 608, 786, 936
- Belcourt – see Senneterre
- Belleterre – (819) 722
- Berry – see Amos
- Blue Sea – see Gracefield
- Boileau – see Harrington
- Bois-Franc – see Maniwaki
- Bouchette – see Messines
- Bowman – see Val-des-Bois
- Brébeuf – see Mont-Tremblant
- Bristol – see Shawville
- Bryson – see Otter Lake
- Bury – (819) 872
- Campbell's Bay – see Otter Lake
- Cantley – see Gatineau
- Cayamant – see Gracefield
- Champlain – (819) 295, 619
- Champneuf – see Rochebaucourt
- Charette – see Saint-Élie-de-Caxton
- Chartierville – (819) 312, 656
- Chazel – see La Sarre
- Chelsea – (819) 335, 607, 827, 866 (873) 324
- Chénéville – see Montpellier
- Chesterville – (819) 202, 382, 504
- Chichester – see L'Isle-aux-Allumettes
- Chisasibi – (819) 855 (873) 365
- Chute-Saint-Philippe – see Lac-des-Écorces
- Clarendon – see Shawville
- Clermont – see La Sarre
- Clerval – see Dupuy
- Cleveland – see Richmond
- Coaticook – (819) 502, 804, 849, 926 (873)- 392 868
- Compton – (819) 501, 835
- Cookshire-Eaton – (819) 553, 875, 889 (873) 825
- Danville – (819) 590, 642, 839
- Daveluyville – (819) 367, 404, 447, 605
- Déléage – see Maniwaki
- Denholm – see Val-des-Monts
- Deschaillons-sur-Saint-Laurent – (819) 292, 599, 632, (873) 267 391
- Dixville – see Coaticook
- Doncaster - see Sainte-Agathe-des-Monts
- Drummondville – (819) 250, 253, 313, 314, 388, 390, 445, 461, 469, 470, 471, 472, 473, 474, 475, 477, 478, 479, 803, 816, 817, 818, 850, 857, 870, 883, 967, 991, (873) 270, 377, 382
- Dudswell – (819) 884, 887
- Duhamel – see Montpellier
- Duhamel-Ouest – see Ville-Marie
- Duparquet – (819) 948
- Dupuy – (819) 783
- Durham-Sud – (819) 248, 858, 970
- East Angus – (819) 251, 451, 832 (873) 827
- East Hereford – (819) 514, 844
- Eastmain – (819) 865 977 (873) 358 544
- Eeyou Istchee Baie-James – (819) 638, 672, 756, 853, 854, 941
- Egan-Sud – see Maniwaki
- Fassett – see Montebello
- Ferme-Neuve – (819) 206, 587
- Fort-Coulonge – see Mansfield-et-Pontefract
- Fortierville – (819) 287, 792
- Frontenac – (873) 585, 624
- Fugèreville – (819) 748
- Gallichan – see Palmarolle
- Gatineau – (819) 205, 208, 209, 210, 213, 230, 243, 246, 259, 271, 281, 282, 303, 307, 317, 318, 319, 328, 329, 332, 351, 360, 410, 412, 414, 420, 431, 439, 469, 483, 484, 485, 486, 500, 503, 506, 510, 525, 557, 561, 568, 576, 581, 592, 593, 595, 598, 600, 617, 624, 635, 639, 643, 654, 661, 663, 664, 665, 669, 682, 684, 685, 700, 708, 712, 718, 743, 744, 770, 771, 772, 773, 775, 776, 777, 778, 779, 790, 800, 815, 881, 886, 893, 904, 914, 915, 916, 918, 920, 921, 923, 928, 930, 931, 934, 938, 939, 953, 955, 956, 957, 961, 962, 965, 966, 968, 986, 994, 997, 999, (873) 320, 322, 386, 396, 397, 408, 469, 510, 738, 800, 992
- Gracefield – (819) 463, 902 (873) 326
- Grand-Remous – (819) 438, 906 (873) 327
- Grand-Saint-Esprit – see Sainte-Monique
- Grandes-Piles – see Shawinigan
- Grenville – see Grenville-sur-la-Rouge
- Grenville-sur-la-Rouge – (819) 242
- Guérin – see Nédélec
- Ham-Nord – (819) 344, 464
- Ham-Sud – see Weedon
- Hampden – see Sherbrooke
- Harrington – (819) 687, (873) 275
- Hatley – see Ayer's Cliff
- Hunter's Point – see Témiscaming
- Inukjuak – (819) 254
- Ivry-sur-le-Lac – see Sainte-Agathe-des-Monts
- Ivujivik – (819) 922
- Kangiqsualujjuaq – (819) 337
- Kangiqsujuaq – (819) 338
- Kangirsuk – (819) 935
- Kazabazua – (819) 467, 972 (873) 328
- Kebaowek – see Témiscaming
- Kiamika - see Lac-des-Écorces
- Kingsbury - see Richmond
- Kingsey Falls – (819) 363, 645
- Kipawa – see Témiscaming
- Kitcisakik – see Val-d'Or
- Kitigan Zibi – see Maniwaki
- Kuujjuaq – (819) 272, 900, 964
- Kuujjuarapik – (819) 929
- L'Ange-Gardien – see Gatineau
- L'Ascension – see Rivière-Rouge
- L'Avenir – (819) 394, 494
- L'Île-du-Grand-Calumet – see Otter Lake
- L'Isle-aux-Allumettes – (819) 689 (873) 323
- La Bostonnais – see La Tuque
- La Conception – see Mont-Tremblant
- La Corne – (819) 799, (873) 372
- La Macaza – see Rivière-Rouge
- La Minerve – (819) 274, (873) 274
- La Morandière-Rochebaucourt – (819) 754
- La Motte – see Amos
- La Patrie – see Notre-Dame-des-Bois
- La Pêche – (819) 456, 459, 720 (873) 338
- La Reine – (819) 947
- La Tuque – (819) 521, 523, 662, 666, 667, 676, 680, 709 (873) 403, 407
- La Sarre – (819) 301, 333, 339, 482, 520, 940, (873) 380
- Labelle – (819) 236, 686, (873) 284
- Lac-des-Écorces – (819) 387, 585
- Lac-des-Plages – see Namur
- Lac-Drolet – (819) 232, 549
- Lac-du-Cerf – see Saint-Aimé-du-Lac-des-Îles
- Lac-Édouard – (819) 653
- Lac-Mégantic – (819) 214, 237, 417, 554, 582, 583, 614, 890, 907, 910, (873) 652, 732, 889
- Lac-Pythonga – (819) 435
- Lac-Saguay – see Nominingue
- Lac-Saint-Paul – see Ferme-Neuve
- Lac-Sainte-Marie – see Kazabazua
- Lac-Simon – see Val-d'Or
- Lac-Simon – see Montpellier
- Lac-Supérieur – see Mont-Tremblant
- Lac-Tremblant-Nord – see Mont-Tremblant
- Laforce – see Belleterre
- Landrienne – see Amos
- Lantier – see Sainte-Agathe-des-Monts
- Latulipe-et-Gaboury – (819) 747, 750
- Launay – see Taschereau
- Laurierville – (819) 365, (873) 829
- Laverlochère-Angliers – (819) 765, 949
- Lebel-sur-Quévillon – (819) 706, 755, 925 (873) 994
- Leclercville – see Deschaillons-sur-Saint-Laurent
- Lefebvre – see L'Avenir
- Lemieux – see Sainte-Marie-de-Blandford
- Lingwick – see Sherbrooke
- Litchfield – see Otter Lake
- Lochaber – see Thurso
- Lochaber-Partie-Ouest – see Gatineau
- Lorrainville – (819) 625
- Louiseville – (819) 228, 498, 721 (873)- 398 865 866
- Low – (819) 422 (873) 329
- Lyster – (819) 389, (873) 828
- Macamic – (819) 782
- Maddington Falls – see Daveluyville
- Magog – (819) 201, 594, 703, 746, 769, 843, 847, 868, 869, 927, (873) 404
- Malartic – (819) 757, 924
- Manawan – (819) 971 (873) 733
- Maniwaki – (819) 215, 305, 306, 315, 334, 441, 449, 462, 528, 892, 973, 982 (873)- 331 390 650 734
- Manseau – (819) 356, 567
- Mansfield-et-Pontefract – (819) 683, 901 (873) 325, 864
- Marston – see Lac-Mégantic
- Martinville – see Compton
- Maskinongé – (819) 227, 497, 626, (873) 268
- Matagami – (819) 739 (873) 937, 938, 995
- Mayo – see Gatineau
- Melbourne – see Richmond
- Messines – (819) 465 (873) 321
- Milan – see Scotstown
- Moffet – see Latulipe-et-Gaboury
- Mont-Blanc – (819) 688, 713, (873) 280
- Mont-Laurier – (819) 203, 401, 436, 440, 499, 513, 616, 623, 660, 833, 951, (873) 388, 659, 867
- Mont-Saint-Michel – see Ferme-Neuve
- Mont-Tremblant – (819) 341, 421, 425, 429, 430, 631, 681, 717, 808, 897, (873) 279, 654
- Montcalm – see Mont-Tremblant
- Montcerf-Lytton – see Maniwaki
- Montebello – (819) 309, 393, 423 (873) 332
- Montpellier – (819) 428, 508
- Mulgrave-et-Derry – see Gatineau
- Namur – (819) 426
- Nantes – (819) 547
- Nédélec – (819) 784
- Nemaska – (819) 673
- Newport – see Sherbrooke
- Nicolet – (819) 262, 293 (873) 996
- Nominingue – (819) 278, 304, (873) 282
- Normétal – (819) 788
- North Hatley – (819) 409, 675, 794, 842
- Notre-Dame-de-Bonsecours – see Montebello
- Notre-Dame-de-Ham – see Ham-Nord
- Notre-Dame-de-la-Merci – see Saint-Donat
- Notre-Dame-de-la-Paix – (819) 522
- Notre-Dame-de-la-Salette – (819) 766
- Notre-Dame-de-Lourdes – (819) 245, 385
- Notre-Dame-des-Bois – (819) 235, 888
- Notre-Dame-du-Bon-Conseil – see Sainte-Clotilde-de-Horton
- Notre-Dame-du-Laus – (819) 767, 793
- Notre-Dame-du-Mont-Carmel – see Trois-Rivières
- Notre-Dame-du-Nord – (819) 723
- Notre-Dame-de-Pontmain – see Saint-Aimé-du-Lac-des-Îles
- Obedjiwan – (819) 974
- Ogden – see Stanstead
- Orford – see Magog
- Otter Lake – (819) 453, 648, 650 (873) 863
- Palmarolle – (819) 787
- Papineauville – (819) 308, 427, 476 (873) 333
- Parisville – see Deschaillons-sur-Saint-Laurent
- Pikogan – see Amos
- Piopolis – see Lac-Mégantic
- Plaisance – see Papineauville
- Plessisville – (819) 252, 291, 362, 621, 789, 998, (873) 735
- Pontiac – (819) 391, 455, 458, 894 (873) 330, 335
- Portage-du-Fort – see Shawville
- Poularies – see Macamic
- Preissac – see Amos
- Princeville – (819) 234, 361, 364, 413, 505
- Puvirnituq – (819) 988
- Quaqtaq – (819) 492
- Rapid Lake – see Maniwaki
- Rapide-Danseur – see Duparquet
- Rémigny – (819) 761
- Richmond – (819) 518, 644, 826, 905, 908, 912
- Ripon – see Saint-André-Avellin
- Rivière-Héva – (819) 735
- Rivière-Rouge – (819) 275, (873) 283
- Roquemaure – see Palmarolle
- Rouyn-Noranda – (819) 277, 279, 290, 490, 493, 637, 649, 759, 760, 762, 763, 764, 768, 797, 880, 917, 945 (873)- 379, 562, 771, 842, 861, 991
- Saint-Adolphe-d'Howard – (819) 327, 584, 714, (873) 278
- Saint-Adrien – see Wotton
- Saint-Aimé-du-Lac-des-Îles – (819) 403, 597
- Saint-Albert – (819) 353, 630
- Saint-Alexis-des-Monts – (819) 265
- Saint-André-Avellin – (819) 405, 516, 885, 981, 983 (873) 651
- Saint-Augustin-de-Woburn – (819) 544, (873) 622
- Saint-Barnabé – (819) 264, 402
- Saint-Benoît-du-Lac – see Magog
- Saint-Bonaventure – see Saint-Guillaume
- Saint-Boniface – (819) 535, 655
- Saint-Bruno-de-Guigues – (819) 728
- Saint-Camille – see Wotton
- Saint-Celestin – (819) 229, 963 (873)-384
- Saint-Christophe-d'Arthabaska – see Victoriaville
- Saint-Claude – see Windsor
- Saint-Cyrille-de-Wendover – (819) 397, 781, 836
- Saint-Denis-de-Brompton – see Sherbrooke
- Saint-Dominique-du-Rosaire – see Amos
- Saint-Donat – (819) 419, 424, (873) 277
- Saint-Edmond-de-Grantham – see Saint-Germain-de-Grantham
- Saint-Édouard-de-Fabre – (819) 634, 670
- Saint-Édouard-de-Maskinongé – see Saint-Paulin
- Saint-Élie-de-Caxton – (819) 221, (873) 409
- Saint-Émile-de-Suffolk – see Namur
- Saint-Étienne-des-Grès – see Trois-Rivières
- Saint-Eugène – Saint-Guillaume
- Saint-Eugène-de-Guigues – (819) 785
- Saint-Félix-de-Kingsey – (819) 512, 848
- Saint-Fortunat – see Ham-Nord
- Saint-François-Xavier-de-Brompton – see Windsor
- Saint-Georges-de-Windsor – see Wotton
- Saint-Germain-de-Grantham – (819) 395, 495, 730
- Saint-Guillaume – (819) 396, 596
- Saint-Herménégilde – see Coaticook
- Saint-Isidore-de-Clifton – (819) 515, 658
- Saint-Justin – see Maskinongé
- Saint-Lambert – see Normétal
- Saint-Léon-le-Grand – see Louiseville
- Saint-Léonard-d'Aston – (819) 399, 615, 937
- Saint-Louis-de-Blandford – see Princeville
- Saint-Luc-de-Vincennes – see Trois-Rivières
- Saint-Lucien – see Drummondville
- Saint-Ludger – (819) 548, (873) 409
- Saint-Majorique-de-Grantham – see Drummondville
- Saint-Malo – see Saint-Isidore-de-Clifton
- Saint-Marc-de-Figuery – see Amos
- Saint-Mathieu-d'Harricana – see Amos
- Saint-Mathieu-du-Parc – (819) 532
- Saint-Maurice – see Trois-Rivières
- Saint-Nazaire-d'Acton – (819) 392, 558
- Saint-Norbert-d'Arthabaska – (819) 261, 369, 882
- Saint-Paulin – (819) 268, (873) 399
- Saint-Pierre-les-Becquets – (819) 263, 745
- Saint-Prosper-de-Champlain – see Trois-Rivières
- Saint-Rémi-de-Tingwick – see Tingwick
- Saint-Roch-de-Mékinac – see Trois-Rives
- Saint-Rosaire – see Victoriaville
- Saint-Samuel – see Saint-Albert
- Saint-Sébastien – (819) 652
- Saint-Sévère – see Saint-Barnabé
- Saint-Sixte – see Saint-André-Avellin
- Saint-Stanislas – see Trois-Rivières
- Saint-Sylvère – (819) 285, 546
- Saint-Valère – see Saint-Albert
- Saint-Venant-de-Paquette – see Saint-Isidore-de-Clifton
- Saint-Wenceslas – (819) 224, 526
- Sainte-Agathe-des-Monts – (819) 216, 217, 219, 222, 321, 323, 324, 325, 326, 507, 603, 774, 863, 896 (873) 648, 649
- Sainte-Angèle-de-Prémont – see Saint-Paulin
- Sainte-Anne-du-Lac – (819) 586, 814
- Sainte-Brigitte-des-Saults – see Sainte-Clotilde-de-Horton
- Sainte-Catherine-de-Hatley – see Magog
- Sainte-Cécile-de-Lévrard – see Saint-Pierre-les-Becquets
- Sainte-Cécile-de-Whitton – see Lac-Mégantic
- Sainte-Christine - see Durham-Sud
- Sainte-Clotilde-de-Horton - (819) 204, 336, 368 (873) 452
- Sainte-Edwidge-de-Clifton - see Coaticook
- Sainte-Élizabeth-de-Warwick - see Warwick
- Sainte-Eulalie – (819) 225, 798
- Sainte-Françoise – see Fortierville
- Sainte-Germaine-Boulé – see Palmarolle
- Sainte-Gertrude-Manneville – see Amos
- Sainte-Hélène-de-Chester – see Chesterville
- Sainte-Hélène-de-Mancebourg – see La Sarre
- Sainte-Lucie-des-Laurentides – see Sainte-Agathe-des-Monts
- Sainte-Marie-de-Blandford – (819) 283, 545
- Sainte-Monique – (819) 289, 530
- Sainte-Perpétue – see Sainte-Clotilde-de-Horton
- Sainte-Séraphine – see Sainte-Clotilde-de-Horton
- Sainte-Sophie-d'Halifax – see Plessisville
- Sainte-Sophie-de-Lévrard – (819) 288, 899
- Sainte-Thérèse-de-la-Gatineau – see Maniwaki
- Sainte-Ursule – see Louiseville
- Saints-Martyrs-Canadiens – see Ham-Nord
- Salluit – (819) 255
- Scotstown – (819) 231, 657
- Senneterre – (819) 737, 952 (873)- 373, 402
- Shawinigan – (819) 247, 529, 531, 533, 534, 536, 537, 538, 539, 540, 556, 719, 729, 731, 805, 852, 913, 989, (873) 271, 378, 405, 737
- Shawville – (819) 509, 647 (873)- 746 862
- Sheenboro – see L'Isle-aux-Allumettes
- Sherbrooke – (819) 200, 212, 238, 239, 240, 257, 276, 300, 340, 342, 345, 346, 347, 348, 349, 366, 416, 432, 434, 437, 446, 452, 481, 541, 542, 560, 562, 563, 564, 565, 566, 569, 570, 571, 572, 573, 574, 575, 577, 578, 580, 588, 612, 620, 636, 640, 674, 678, 679, 742, 780, 791, 812, 820, 821, 822, 823, 829, 846, 861, 864, 891, 919, 933, 942, 943, 969, 987, 993, (873) 371, 389, 500, 600, 601, 602, 603, 604, 605, 606, 607, 608, 609, 826, 888, 989
- Stanstead – (819) 267, 704, 876
- Stanstead-Est – see Stanstead
- Stoke – (819) 258, 543, 878
- Stornoway – see Saint-Sébastien
- Taschereau – (819) 796
- Tasiujaq – (819) 633
- Témiscaming – (819) 220, 627 (873) 997
- Thorne – see Shawville
- Thurso – (819) 659, 707, 985 (873) 337
- Timiskaming First Nation – see Notre-Dame-du-Nord
- Tingwick – (819) 359, 749
- Trécesson – see Amos
- Trois-Rives – (819) 241, 646
- Trois-Rivières – (819) 244, 266, 269, 299, 370, 371, 372, 373, 374, 375, 376, 377, 378, 379, 380, 383, 384, 386, 415, 448, 489, 519, 524, 601, 609, 668, 690, 691, 692, 693, 694, 695, 696, 697, 698, 699, 701, 801, 807, 840, 841, 862, 898, 909, 944, 979, 992, 995, 996, (873) 220, 255, 269, 387, 410, 804, 887, 993
- Ulverton – see Richmond
- Umiujaq – (819) 331
- Val-d'Or – (819) 270, 280, 316, 354, 355, 488, 527, 550, 651, 710, 736, 738, 824, 825, 831, 856, 859, 860, 874, 975 (873)- 381, 395, 561, 770, 841, 860
- Val-David – (819) 320, 322 (873) 276
- Val-des-Bois – (819) 454
- Val-des-Lacs – see Sainte-Agathe-des-Monts
- Val-des-Monts – (819) 457, 671, 813, 903 (873) 336
- Val-des-Sources – (819) 223, 716, 879
- Val-Joli – see Windsor
- Val-Morin – see Sainte-Agathe-des-Monts
- Val-Racine – see Scotstown
- Val-Saint-Gilles – see La Sarre
- Victoriaville – (819) 260, 302, 330, 350, 352, 357, 402, 433, 460, 551, 552, 604, 740, 751, 752, 758, 795, 806, 809, 960, 980, 984, 990, (873) 300 303, 375, 406 430
- Ville-Marie – (819) 622, 629, 702, 946 (873)- 374, 394, 736, 818, 998
- Villeroy – (819) 381, 715
- Waltham – see L'Isle-aux-Allumettes
- Warwick – (819) 358, 559, 641
- Waskaganish – (819) 895 (873) 458
- Waswanipi – (819) 753 (873) 357
- Waterville – (819) 408, 677, 837, (873) 623
- Weedon – (819) 877, (873) 266 823
- Wemindji – (819) 978 (873) 588
- Wemotaci – see La Tuque
- Westbury – see Sherbrooke
- Wickham – (819) 398, 400, 741
- Windsor – (819) 517, 628, 725, 845, 932
- Winneway – see Belleterre
- Wôlinak – see Bécancour
- Wotton – (819) 286, 828
- Yamachiche – (819) 296, 466, 618
- Shared-cost service – (819) 310
- Premium services – 1 (819/873) 976

== See also ==
- List of North American Numbering Plan area codes

Quebec area codes: 367/418/581, 354/450/579, 263/438/514, 468/819/873
	North: 867	
West: 705/249	468/819/873	East: 367/418/581, 709
	South: 207, 450/579, 613/343, 603, 802	
Ontario area codes: 416/437/647/942, 519/226/548/382, 613/343/753, 705/249/683, 807, 905/289/365/742
Newfoundland and Labrador area codes: 709/879
Yukon, Northwest Territories and Nunavut area codes: 867
New Hampshire area codes: 603
Vermont area codes: 802
Maine area codes: 207
