= Outaouais =

Administrative region of Quebec, Canada

- Administrative region
- Coordinates: 45°47′N 75°05′W
- Country: Canada
- Province: Quebec
- Regional County Municipalities (RCM) and Equivalent Territories (ET): 4 RCM, 1 ET: La Vallée-de-la-Gatineau; Les Collines-de-l'Outaouais; Papineau; Pontiac; Gatineau (ET)

Government
  - Regional conference of elected officers: Paulette Lalande (President)

Area
  - Total: 33,442 km^{2} (12,912 sq mi)
  - Land: 30,457.52 km^{2} (11,759.71 sq mi)

Population (2021)
  - Total: 405,158
  - Density: 13.3/km^{2} (34/sq mi)
- Demonym: Outaouaien(ne)
- Time zone: UTC−05:00 (EST)
  - Summer (DST): UTC−04:00 (EDT)
- Postal code prefix: J
- Area codes: 819, 873
- Website: Outaouais.gouv.qc.ca

Outaouais (/uːtəweɪ/, French pronunciation: [utawɛ]; also commonly called The Outaouais) is an administrative region of western Quebec, Canada. It includes the city of Gatineau, the municipality of Val-des-Monts, the municipality of Cantley and the Papineau region. Geographically, it is located on the north side of the Ottawa River opposite Canada's capital, Ottawa. It has a land area of 30,457.52 square kilometres (11,759.71 sq mi) and its population was 405,158 inhabitants as of 2021.

From 2017 to 2021, the Outaouais has a lower per capita disposable income than the rest of Quebec. It was $32,364 in 2021, compared to $34,180 in Quebec overall. In 2021, the unfavourable margin remained stable at 5.3%.

== History ==
The name of the region comes from the French name for the Ottawa River, which in turn comes from the French name for the Indigenous Odawa that lived near the region. Prior to European arrival in the region, the areas along the Ottawa River were commonly used by various tribes to trade and gather.

The oldest European settlement in the region is Hull (now a neighbourhood of Gatineau) which was founded in 1800 by Philemon Wright as Wright's Town. The settlement quickly became involved in the lumber trade, which continued along the Ottawa River until the late 20th century. None of the original town buildings remain today, as they were destroyed in the 1900 Hull–Ottawa fire. Hull remained as a city until 2002, when it was merged with several neighboring cities to form the current city of Gatineau.

== Demography ==
For the next few years, the Outaouais is predicted to enjoy continuous demographic increase.

From 2021 to 2026, the region's population is predicted to expand faster than the rest of Quebec (+4.8% against +4.2%).

Longer-term projections show that the region's population will expand faster than Quebec's for each following five-year period.

Demographic trends and outlook
	2021–2026	2026–2031	2031–2036	2036–2041
Outaouais	4.8 %	2.8%	2.2%	1.8%
The province of Quebec	4.2%	2.4%	1.9%	1.6%

Year after year, the Outaouais' net migration (inflows minus outflows) with other areas is positive.

Yet, for the first time in 20 years, the area had negative net migration in 2020–2021.

Historically, the Outaouais area averaged positive inter-regional migration balances, gaining 541 residents each year for a net rate of +0.14% from 2016 to 2021.

Interregional migration rate

- 2016–2017 : 0.16 %
- 2017–2018 : 0.25 %
- 2018–2019 : 0.19 %
- 2019–2020 : 0.12 %
- 2020–2021 : -0.01 %

== Economy ==
In 2021, the situation on the Outaouais labour market has improved. Employment increased by 9,500 positions.

The participation rate increased to 63.7%. The negative gap between the region's participation rate and that of Quebec narrowed from 1.0 to 0.4 percentage points.

The employment rate increased to 60.2% in the region. The region now has an employment rate comparable to that of Quebec (60.1%).

Since 1999, the Outaouais has generally had a lower unemployment rate than Quebec as a whole. In 2021, this trend continued; the unemployment rate decreased by 2.5 percentage points to 5.6%, compared to 6.1% for Quebec as a whole. This decrease is explained by the improvement in employment.

The Outaouais' industrial structure matches its mission, which is concentrated on government services. As a result, the economy is heavily geared towards the service sector.

In 2021, the primary sector in the Outaouais accounted for a lower proportion of jobs than the primary sector in Quebec as a whole (1.4% vs. 2.2%).

Also, the manufacturing sector employed fewer people than the rest of Quebec (4.0% vs. 11.3%).

Nonetheless, the construction sector employed more people in the Outaouais (8.4%) than in Quebec overall (6.7%).

The region's economy is dominated by tertiarization. The tertiary sector's percentage of total employment (86.1%) is substantially larger than that reported in Quebec overall (79.7%). This finding is explained by the significance of public services.

In 2021, the Outaouais would account for 4.7% of Quebec's population and 4.6% of its jobs.

== Administrative divisions ==
=== Regional county municipalities ===
Regional County Municipality (RCM)	Population Canada 2021 Census.	Change (%)	Land Area	Density (pop. per km^{2})	Seat of RCM
La Vallée-de-la-Gatineau	20,547	▲1.8%	12,362.49 km^{2} (4,773.18 sq mi)	1.7	Gracefield
Les Collines-de-l'Outaouais	54,498	▲11%	2,025.38 km^{2} (782.00 sq mi)	26.9	Chelsea
Papineau	24,308	▲6.5%	2,903.45 km^{2} (1,121.03 sq mi)	8.4	Papineauville
Pontiac	14,764	▲3.6%	12,824.36 km^{2} (4,951.51 sq mi)	1.2	Campbell's Bay
Gatineau (Ottawa-Gatineau (Quebec part))	353,293	▲6.3%	3,381.83 km^{2} (1,305.73 sq mi)	104.5	Gatineau

=== Indian reserves ===
- Kitigan Zibi
- Lac-Rapide

== Major communities ==
- Cantley
- Chelsea
- Déléage
- Gatineau
- Gracefield
- L'Ange-Gardien
- La Pêche
- Maniwaki
- Mansfield-et-Pontefract
- Papineauville
- Pontiac
- Saint-André-Avellin
- Thurso
- Val-des-Monts

== School districts ==
=== Francophone ===
- Centre de services scolaire au Cœur-des-Vallées
- Centre de services scolaire des Draveurs
- Centre de services scolaire des Hauts-Bois-de-l'Outaouais
- Centre de services scolaire des Portages-de-l'Outaouais

=== Anglophone ===
- Western Québec School Board
