= Quebec Route 105 =

Highway in Quebec

Route 105

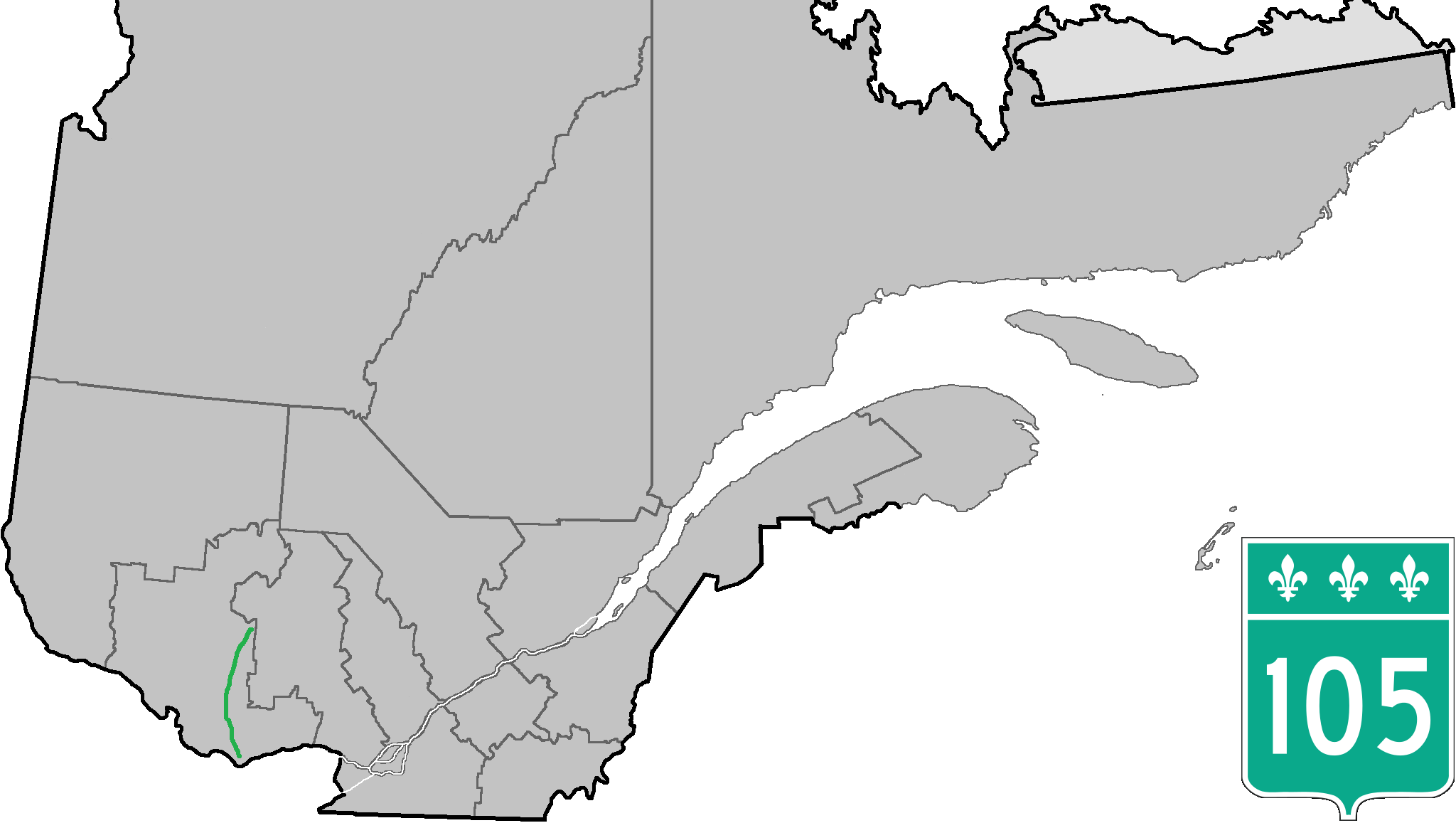

Route information
- Maintained by Transports Québec
- Length: 157 km (98 mi)
- History: Route 11

Major junctions
- South end: A-5 in Gatineau
- A-5 / R-366 in Wakefield; R-301 in Kazabazua; R-107 in Maniwaki
- North end: R-117 (TCH) in Grand-Remous

Location
- Country: Canada
- Province: Quebec

Highway system
- Quebec provincial highways; Autoroutes; List; Former
← R-104	→ R-107

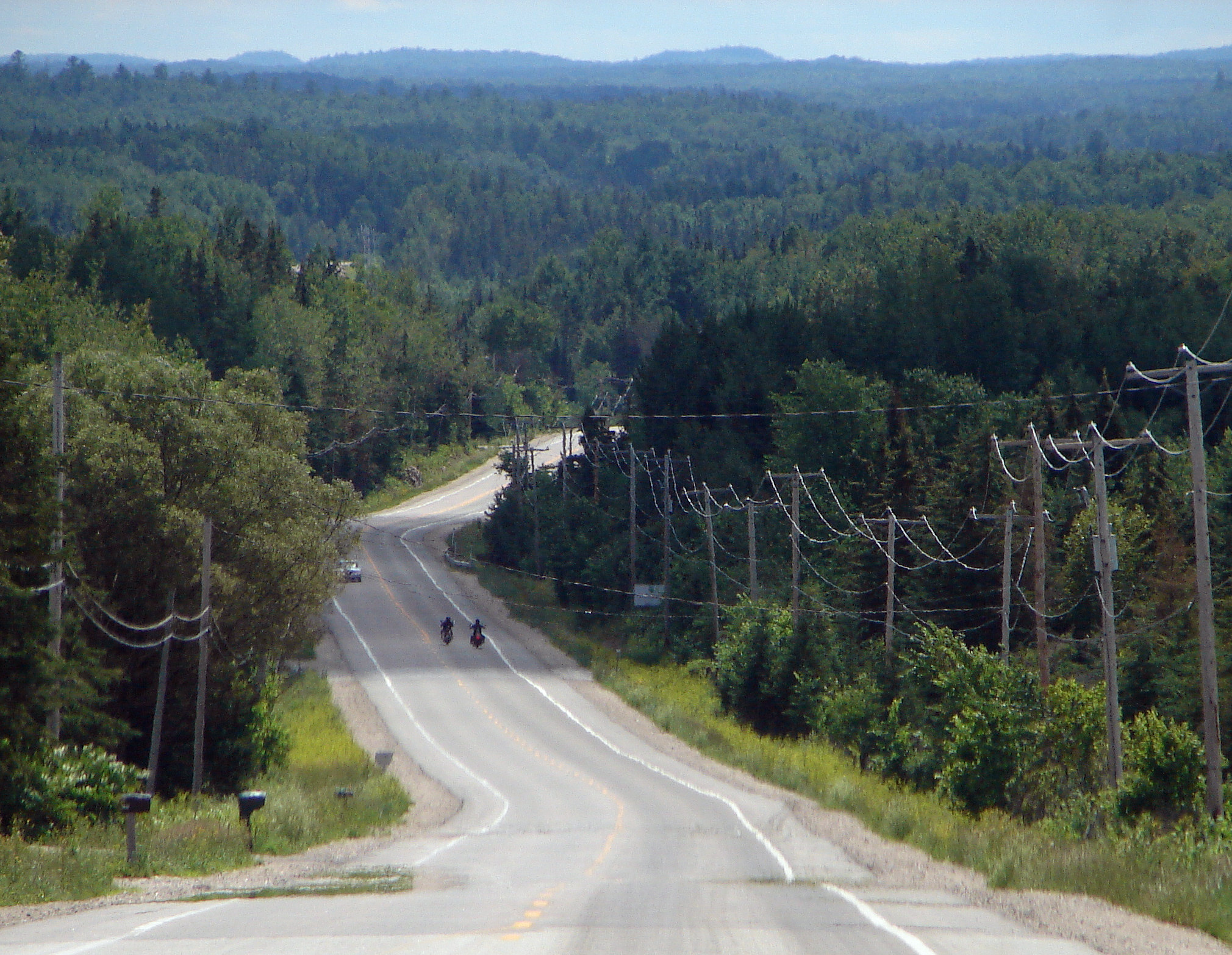
Highway 105 between Bois-Franc and Egan-Sud.

Route 105 is a north-south highway in Quebec, Canada. It runs from Hull (now part of Gatineau), where it is known as Boulevard Saint-Joseph (until the limits with Chelsea), to Grand-Remous where it ends at Route 117.

Route 105 runs mostly in the Gatineau River valley, where it is characterized by twisty and hilly sections. Besides Hull, the only other significant town along the route is Maniwaki.

Originally part of the former Route 11, it was renumbered to 105 in the 1970s, and runs parallel to Autoroute 5 in the Gatineau area.

== Municipalities along Route 105 ==
- Gatineau
- Chelsea
- La Pêche (Wakefield / Alcove / Farrellton)
- Low
- Kazabazua
- Wright
- Gracefield
- Bouchette
- Messines
- Kitigan Zibi
- Maniwaki
- Egan-Sud
- Bois-Franc
- Grand-Remous

== Major intersections ==
RCM or ET	Municipality	Km	Road	Notes
Southern terminus of Route 105
Gatineau	Hull	0.0	A-5 (Exit 5)	5 SOUTH: to Gatineau; 5 NORTH: to Chelsea
Les Collines-de-l'Outaouais	Chelsea	2.0	Chemin Alonzo-Wright	To R-307
Les Collines-de-l'Outaouais	Chelsea	6.5	Chemin d'Old Chelsea	To Old Chelsea
Les Collines-de-l'Outaouais	Chelsea	18.3	A-5 (North end / Exit 21)	5 SOUTH: to Gatineau
Les Collines-de-l'Outaouais	La Pêche	27.3; 30.8	R-366 (Overlap 3.5 km)	366 WEST: to Thorne; 366 EAST: to Val-des-Monts
La Vallée-de-la-Gatineau	Kazabazua	68.9	Chemin du Lac-Sainte-Marie	EAST: to Lac-Sainte-Marie
La Vallée-de-la-Gatineau	Kazabazua	71.1	R-301 (North end)	301 SOUTH: to Alleyn-et-Cawood
La Vallée-de-la-Gatineau	Gracefield	87.0	Chemin du Lac-Cayamant	WEST: to Lac-Cayamant
La Vallée-de-la-Gatineau	Gracefield	88.9	Rue Saint-Eugène	NORTH: to Blue Sea
La Vallée-de-la-Gatineau	Gracefield	96.8	Chemin du Calumet	SOUTH: to Northfield
La Vallée-de-la-Gatineau	Messines	112.1	Chemin de l'Entrée Nord	WEST: to Messines and Blue Sea
La Vallée-de-la-Gatineau	Maniwaki	126.9	R-107 (South end)	107 NORTH: to Déléage
La Vallée-de-la-Gatineau	Bois-Franc	144.0	Chemin de Bois-Franc–Montcerf	WEST: to Montcerf-Lytton
La Vallée-de-la-Gatineau	Grand-Remous	157.0	R-117 (TCH)	117 NORTH: to Val-d'Or; 117 SOUTH: to Mont-Laurier
Northern terminus of Route 105

== See also ==
- List of Quebec provincial highways
