= La Pêche =

- Municipality
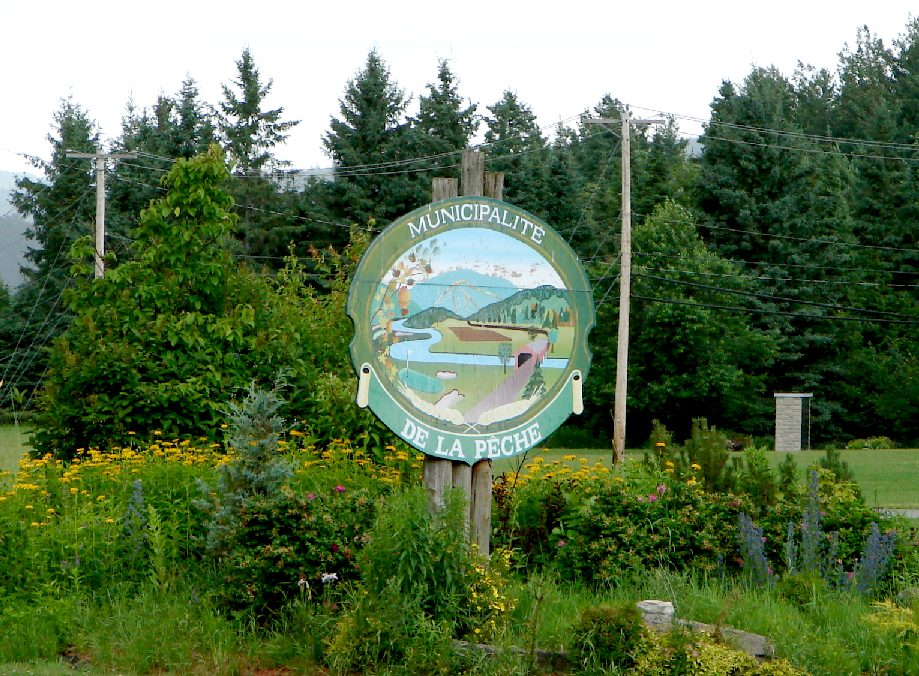

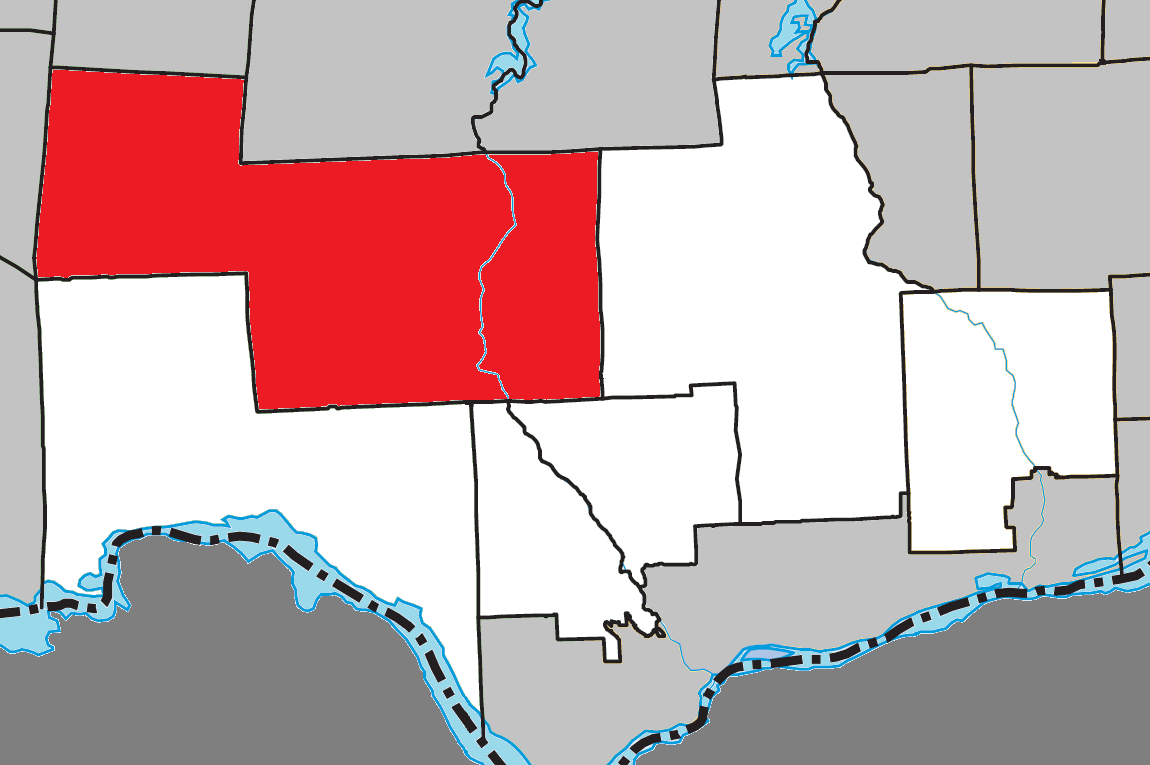
- Location within Les Collines-de-l'Outaouais RCM

- Location in western Quebec
- Coordinates: 45°41′N 75°59′W
- Country: Canada
- Province: Quebec
- Region: Outaouais
- RCM: Les Collines-de-l'Outaouais
- Constituted: January 1, 1975

Government
  - Mayor: Guillaume Lamoureux
  - Federal riding: Pontiac—Kitigan Zibi
  - Prov. riding: Gatineau

Area
  - Total: 616.50 km^{2} (238.03 sq mi)
  - Land: 577.18 km^{2} (222.85 sq mi)

Population (2021)
  - Total: 8,636
  - Density: 15/km^{2} (39/sq mi)
  - Pop 2016–2021: ▲9.8%
  - Dwellings: 4,962
- Time zone: UTC– 05:00 (EST)
  - Summer (DST): UTC– 04:00 (EDT)
- Postal code(s): J0X 2W0
- Area code: 819
- Highways: R-105; R-366
- Website: www.villelapeche.qc.ca

La Pêche (French: [la pɛːʃ], locally [la paɪ̯ʃ]; meaning "Fishing") is a municipality along both sides of the Gatineau River in Les Collines-de-l'Outaouais Regional County Municipality in the Outaouais region of Quebec, Canada, about 30 km (19 mi) north of downtown Gatineau.

Bordering on the north side of the Gatineau Park, La Pêche provides multiple access points to this park.

La Pêche was declared Quebec's first and Canada's second fair trade town on November 9, 2007.

== Communities ==
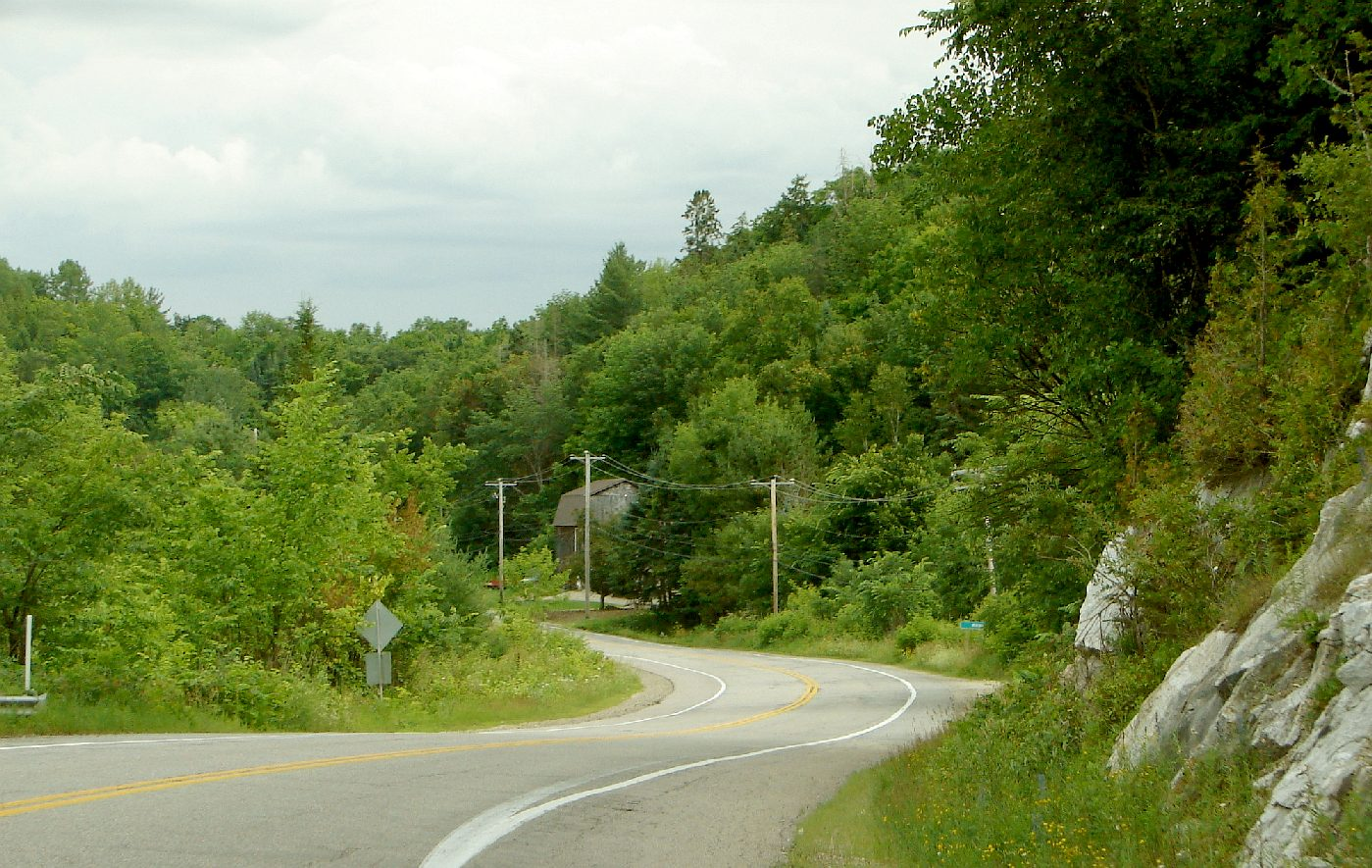
Highway 105 at Alcove.

It includes the following villages and communities:

- Duclos
- East Aldfield
- Edelweiss
- Farrellton
- Lac-des-Loups (Wolf Lake)
- Lascelles, Rupert and Alcove
- Sainte-Cécile-de-Masham
- Saint-François-de-Masham
- Saint-Louis-de-Masham
- Wakefield

== History ==
The geographic townships of Aldfield, Masham, and Wakefield were already plotted on the Gale and Duberger Map of 1795, all named after places in Yorkshire, England. Around 1825, logging began in the area, while European settlement began around 1847 with the arrival of large number of people of York County in England.

La Pêche was formed in 1975 through the merger of the township municipalities of Wakefield and Aldfield, the village of Wakefield, and the municipality of Sainte-Cécile-de-Masham. It was named after La Pêche Lake and La Pêche River.

== Demographics ==
Canada census – La Pêche community profile

	2021	2016	2011
Population	8,636 (+9.8% from 2016)	7,863 (3.2% from 2011)	7,619 (1.9% from 2006)
Land area	577.18 km^{2} (222.85 sq mi)	585.93 km^{2} (226.23 sq mi)	584.65 km^{2} (225.73 sq mi)
Population density	15/km^{2} (39/sq mi)	13.4/km^{2} (35/sq mi)	13.0/km^{2} (34/sq mi)
Median age	46.4 (M: 45.6, F: 46.4)	46.1 (M: 45.9, F: 46.4)	44.5 (M: 44.0, F: 45.1)
Private dwellings	4,962 (total) 3,669 (occupied)	4,665 (total)	4,490 (total)
Median household income	$87,000	$71,936	$67,512

References: 2021 2016 2011

Historical census populations
Year	Pop.	±%
1986	5,394	—
1991	5,854	+8.5%
1996	6,160	+5.2%
2001	6,453	+4.8%
2006	7,477	+15.9%
2011	7,619	+1.9%
2016	7,863	+3.2%
2021	8,636	+9.8%

Mother tongue:

- English as first language: 36.8%
- French as first language: 58.0%
- English and French as first language: 1.8%
- Other as first language: 2.6%

== See also ==
- List of anglophone communities in Quebec
