= Blue Sea Lake =

Lake in Quebec, Canada

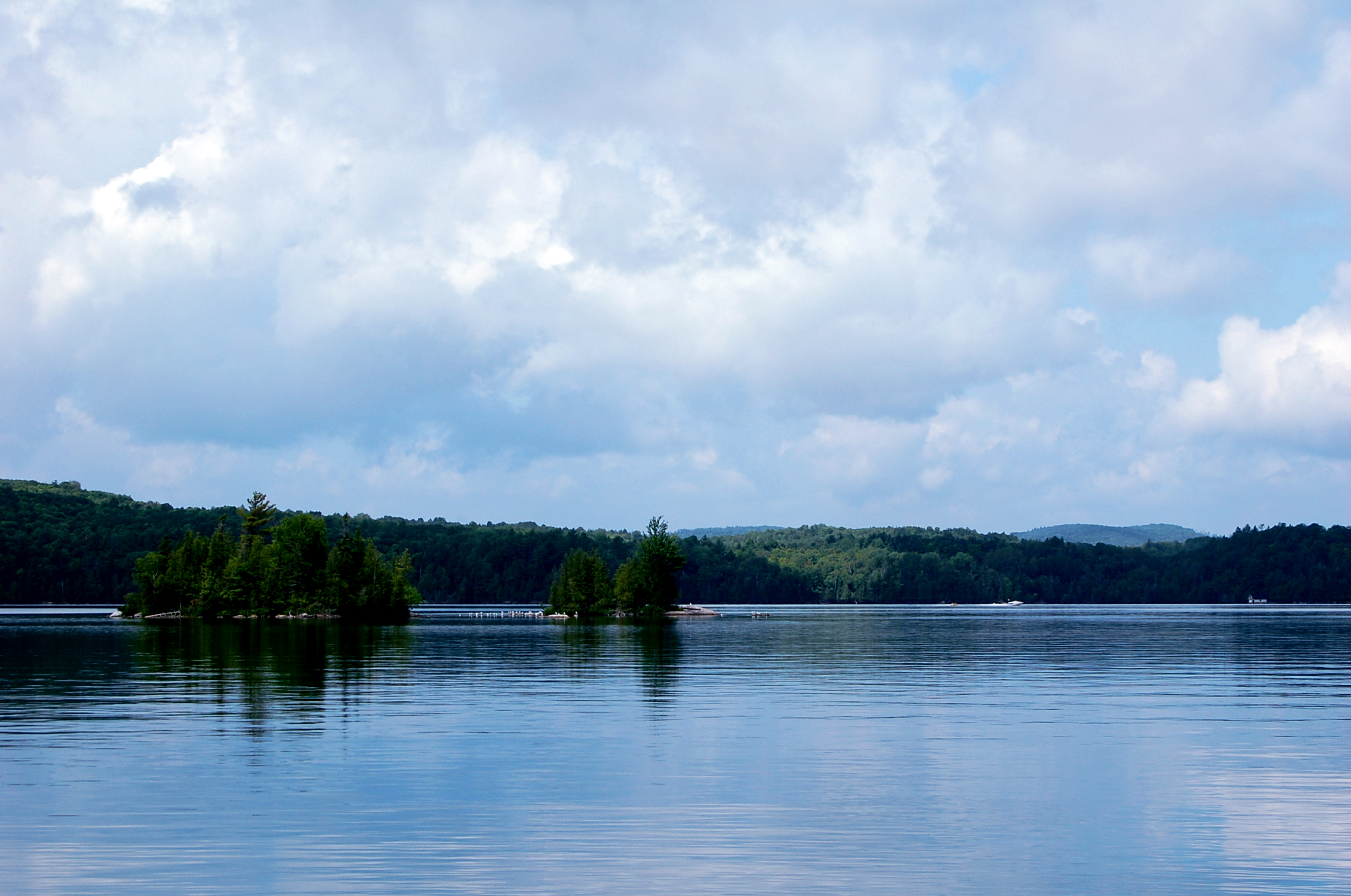

- Location in Quebec
- Location: Blue Sea / Messines, Quebec
- Coordinates: 46°13′0″N 76°03′20″W
- Primary outflows: Blue Sea River
- Basin countries: Canada
- Max. length: 10 km (6.2 mi)
- Max. width: 3.4 km (2.1 mi)
- Surface area: 14 km^{2} (5.4 sq mi)
- Surface elevation: 165 m (541 ft)

Blue Sea Lake (in French: Lac Blue Sea) is a lake in the municipalities of Blue Sea and Messines, Quebec, Canada, about 90 kilometers (56 mi) north of Gatineau. It is known for its crystal clear water and is surrounded by cottages on its shores.

The blue waters of Blue Sea Lake, together with its dimensions and the absence of significant relief around, create the illusion of a sea. It feeds the Blue Sea River which empties into the Picanoc River, in turn a tributary of the Gatineau River. Its name first appeared on a map of Hull County in 1928.

Just over 10 kilometers (6.2 mi) to the west, in Cayamant, is another, somewhat smaller lake called Lac de la Mer Bleue, which also means "Blue Sea Lake". To distinguish between these two lakes, the English name is used for the larger one, even in French.

== Geography ==
The town of Blue Sea is in the centre of what is known as the Upper Gatineau region and is surrounded by a number of other lakes, rivers, ponds, and wetlands — and true wilderness areas. Like so many other areas of Quebec, Blue Sea grew and prospered because of the forest industry, which in turn was dependent on the abundant waterways of the region, especially the Gatineau.

== Local folklore ==
According to legend, a monstrous snake-like animal with a horse head used to live in this lake. Presumably seen by several people between 1913 and 1930, this exceptionally long, large, and fast seahorse has no longer given any signs of life since, except around 1980 in the Baskatong Reservoir, located much further north. His "absence" has been explained by the increase of tourism in the region and, hence, the number of motorized boats travelling on the lake. The Algonquin of Maniwaki called this monster "Misiganebic" or Grand Serpent, who supposedly cut a trail between Blue Sea and Cedar Lakes and would have manifested itself in several surrounding lakes and rivers.

== See also ==
- List of lakes of Quebec
