= Alcove, Quebec =

Community in Quebec, Canada

Coordinates: 45°41′00″N 75°55′50″W

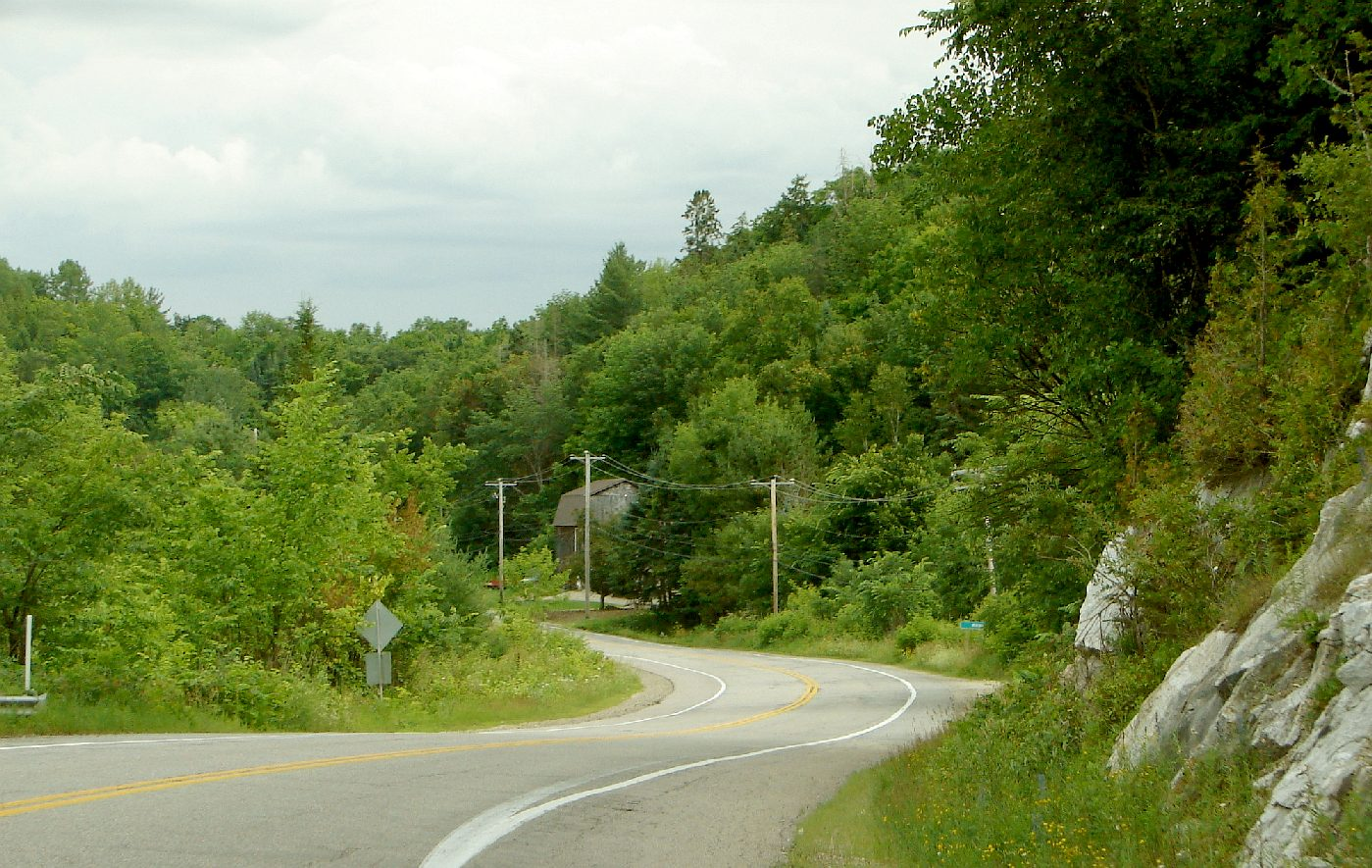
Highway 105 at Alcove

Alcove is a small community in Quebec, Canada, part of the Municipality of La Pêche. It is located along Highway 105 and the Gatineau River approximately 35 minutes north of Ottawa, immediately north of Wakefield and south of Farrellton.

The main features of Alcove are a gas station, church, graveyard and aged buildings. There is road access to the Gatineau River for boat launching. Alcove is also the building/launching site of the famous Wakefield Canada Day raft, constructed by the local youth yearly and floated down the Gatineau river to Wakefield.

The last remaining attraction in Alcove is the secluded graveyard in the centre of the village. It was created by the Pritchard family, the founding family of the area. It is on private property and has not been in use for more than half a century.
