= Kazabazua =

- Municipality
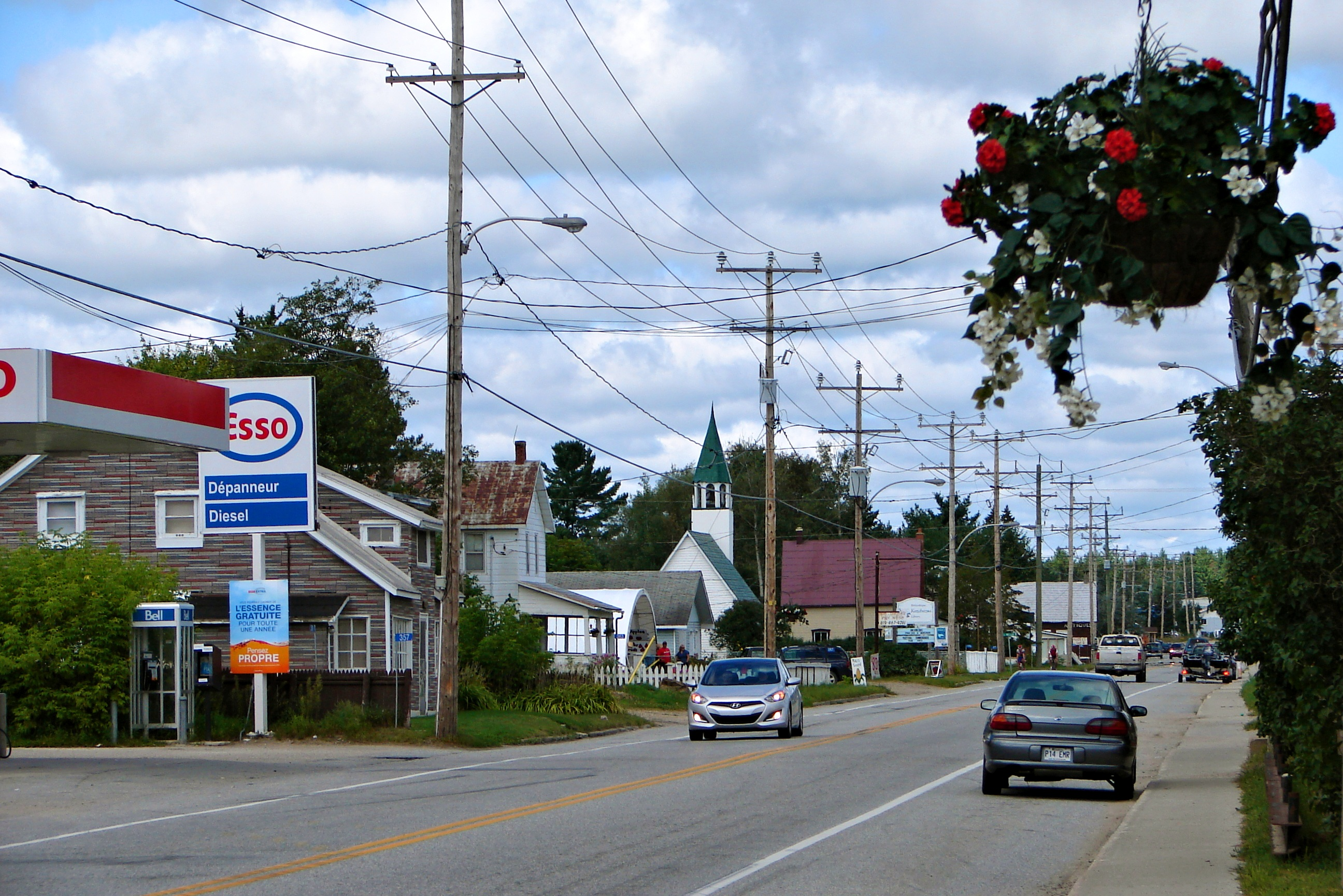
- Nicknames: Kaz, Kazu
- Location in western Quebec
- Coordinates: 45°57′N 76°01′W
- Country: Canada
- Province: Quebec
- Region: Outaouais
- RCM: La Vallée-de-la-Gatineau
- Settled: 1835
- Constituted: January 1, 1862
- Named for: Kazabazua River

Government
  - Mayor: Robert Bergeron
  - Federal riding: Pontiac—Kitigan Zibi
  - Prov. riding: Gatineau

Area
  - Total: 182.17 km^{2} (70.34 sq mi)
  - Land: 172.91 km^{2} (66.76 sq mi)

Population (2021)
  - Total: 1,037
  - Density: 6/km^{2} (16/sq mi)
  - Pop (2016–21): ▲9.7%
  - Dwellings: 832
- Time zone: UTC−5 (EST)
  - Summer (DST): UTC−4 (EDT)
- Postal code(s): J0X 1X0
- Area code: 819
- Access Routes: R-105; R-301
- Website: www.kazabazua.ca

Kazabazua is a village and municipality in La Vallée-de-la-Gatineau Regional County Municipality, Quebec, Canada. The village is about halfway between Maniwaki and Hull at the intersection of Route 105 and Route 301, just west of the Gatineau River.

The village and municipality are named after the Kazabazua River which passes through it. Like many other First Nations names, Kazabazua has had many spellings in English, such as Kazaluzu, Kasubasua, Cazabasua, Cazibazouis, Cazebalzuac, Cajibajouis. This word comes from the Algonquin word kachibadjiwan, from kach ("hidden") and djiwan ("current"), hence it means "underground river". This name is a reflection of the local topography because the Kazabazua River disappears underground and resurfaces a few dozen metres downstream. The river then flows through rapids and passes under a natural stone bridge.

The communities of Kazabazua Station, Aylwin, and Aylwin Station are also located within the municipality.

== Geology ==
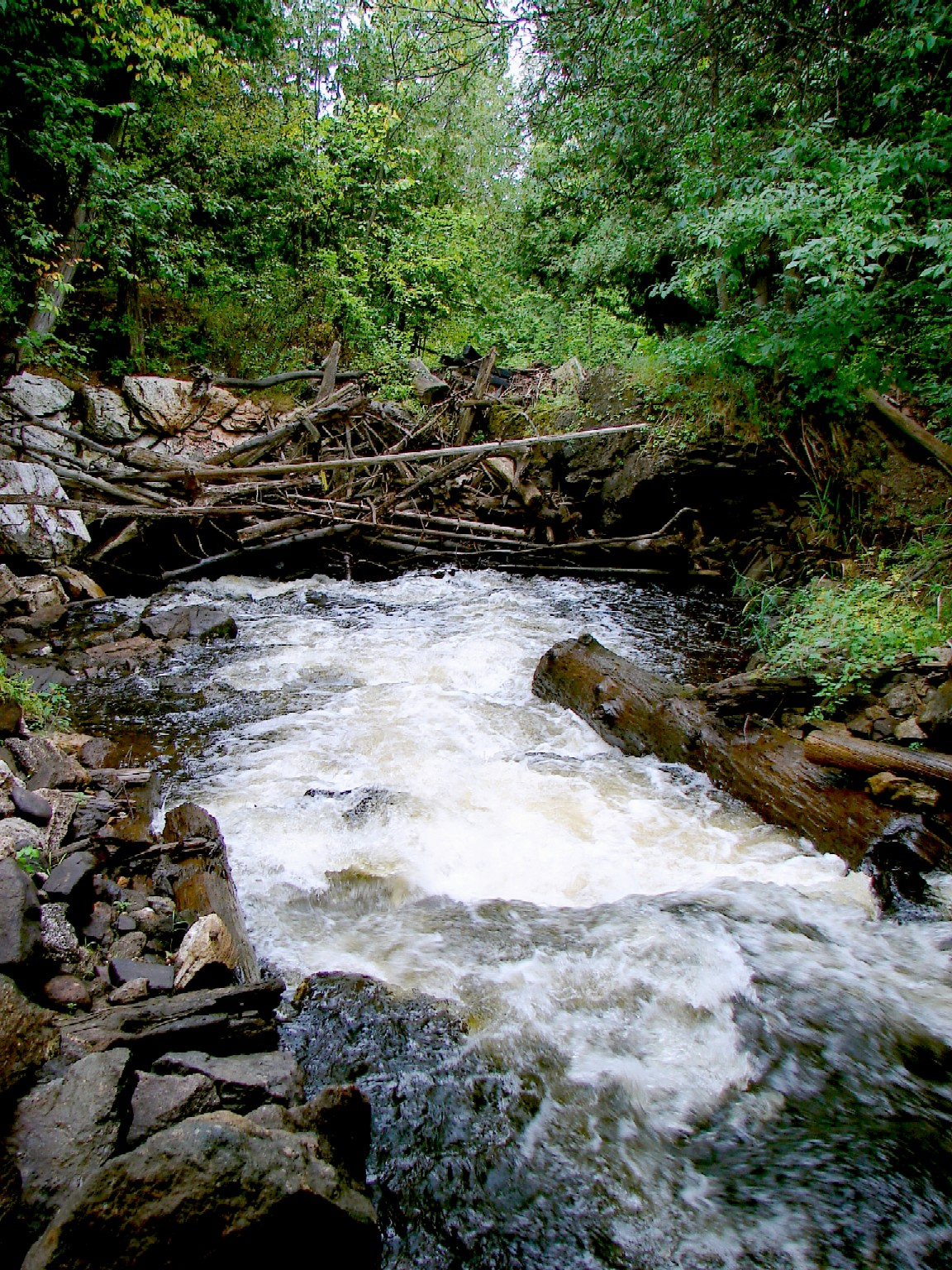
The Kazabazua River disappearing underground.

The bedrock of the region Kazabazua is composed predominantly of marble dating from the Precambrian Era and represent metamorphic sedimentary rocks from the Grenville orogeny.

At the Kazabazua River, marble is calcitic and contains crystals of graphite and grossular garnet. The marble has been chemically and mechanically eroded by water from the river to form a karst stone bridge. The inclusion of gneiss in the marble illustrates erosion differential.

The Kazabazua Plain is a geomorphological phenomenon unique to Quebec. It is made up of metamorphic rocks which are covered with a network of ancient sand dunes and bogs within which many rare plant species and threatened species have been identified. The topography is the result of water and wind action since the withdrawal of the last glacier. After this withdrawal, the region was covered by the Champlain Sea, which left a layer of marine clay. When the sea level lowered, the area was submerged under a postglacial delta which deposited large volumes of sand.

== History ==
Circa 1835, the area began to be settled and the community was originally called Hoganville, in memory of the first pioneers, the Hogan family, who were soon joined by the Gabie, Chamberlain, and Pritchard families.

In 1858, the Aylwin Township was formed, followed in 1862 by the township municipality with the same name. These were named after judge and politician Thomas Cushing Aylwin (1806–1871). Also in 1862, the local post office opened, named Kazubazua. As evidenced by Lovell's Gazetteer of 1873, the village itself also began to be popularly known as Kazubazua.

In 1932, the name was changed to Kazabazua and the municipality legally took this name in 1976. It is often shortened to "Kaz" by locals.

== Demographics ==
Historical census populations – Kazabazua

Year	Pop.	±%
1976	577	—
1981	645	+11.8%
1986	656	+1.7%
1991	636	−3.0%
1996	759	+19.3%

Year	Pop.	±%
2001	786	+3.6%
2006	839	+6.7%
2011	847	+1.0%
2016	945	+11.6%
2021	1,037	+9.7%

Source: Statistics Canada

Private dwellings occupied by usual residents (2021): 484 (total dwellings: 832)

Languages:

- English as first language: 42.3%
- French as first language: 53.4%
- English and French as first language: 3.7%

== See also ==
- List of anglophone communities in Quebec
