= Little Cedar =

Little Cedar can mean either of the following places:

- Little Cedar Lake, a lake in the Canadian province of Quebec
- Little Cedar, Iowa, a community in the United States
