= Quebec Route 107 =

Highway in Quebec, Canada

Route 107

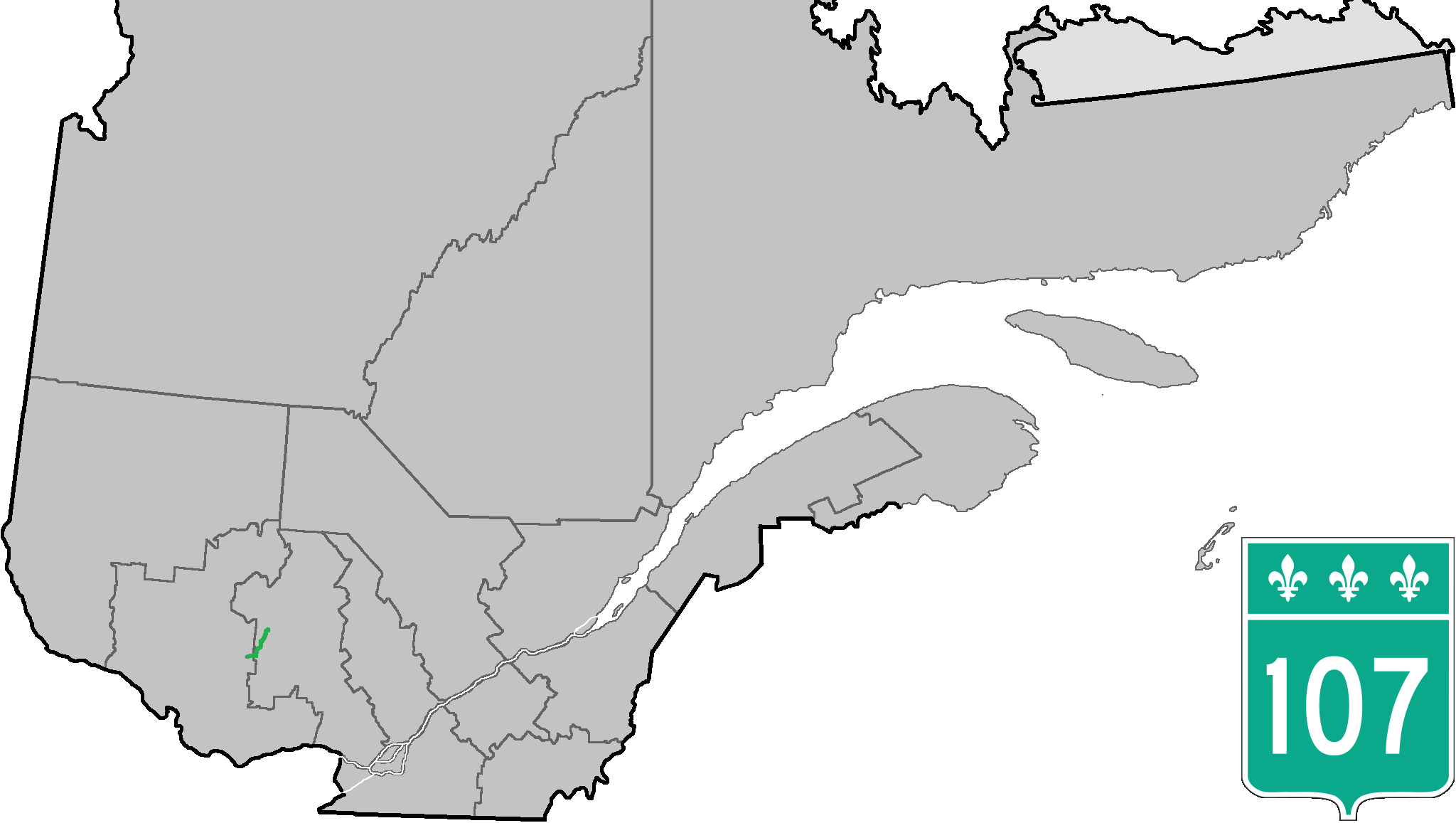

Route information
- Maintained by Transports Québec
- Length: 38.8 km (24.1 mi)

Major junctions
- South end: R-105 in Maniwaki
- North end: R-117 (TCH) in Grand-Remous

Location
- Country: Canada
- Province: Quebec

Highway system
- Quebec provincial highways; Autoroutes; List; Former
← R-105	→ R-108

Route 107 is a north/south highway on the north shore of the Saint Lawrence River. Its southern terminus is in Maniwaki at the junction of Route 105 and its northern terminus is in Grand-Remous at the junction of Route 117.

== Municipalities along Route 107 ==
- Maniwaki
- Déléage
- Aumond
- Grand-Remous

== Major intersections ==
RCM or ET	Municipality	Km	Junction	Notes
Southern terminus of Route 107
La Vallée-de-la-Gatineau	Maniwaki	0.0	R-105	105 SOUTH: to Gatineau; 105 NORTH: to Grand-Remous
La Vallée-de-la-Gatineau	Déléage	5.7	Chemin de Sainte-Thérèse-de-la-Gatineau	SOUTH: to Sainte-Thérèse-de-la-Gatineau
La Vallée-de-la-Gatineau	Grand-Remous	38.8	R-117 (TCH)	117 SOUTH: to Mont-Laurier; 117 NORTH: to Val-d'Or
Northern terminus of Route 107

== See also ==
- List of Quebec provincial highways
