= Grand-Remous =

- Municipality
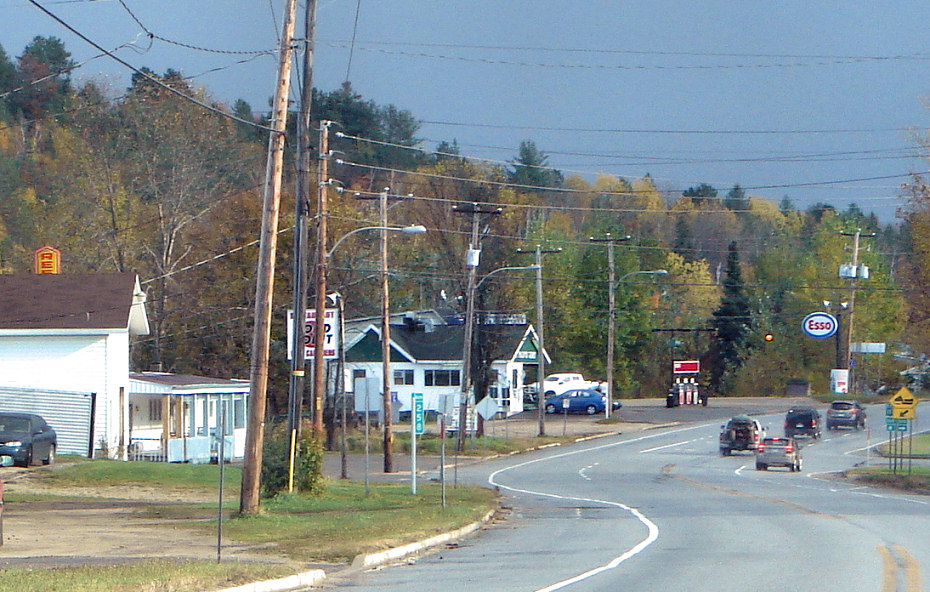

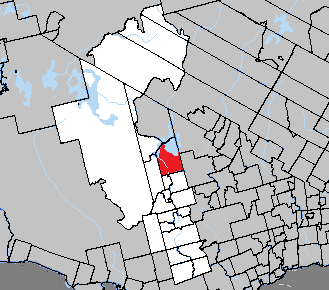
- Location within La Vallée-de-la-Gatineau RCM.

- Location in western Quebec
- Coordinates: 46°37′N 75°54′W
- Country: Canada
- Province: Quebec
- Region: Outaouais
- RCM: La Vallée-de-la-Gatineau
- Constituted: April 29, 1937

Government
  - Mayor: Jocelyne Lyrette
  - Federal riding: Pontiac—Kitigan Zibi
  - Prov. riding: Gatineau

Area
  - Total: 509.89 km^{2} (196.87 sq mi)
  - Land: 351.63 km^{2} (135.77 sq mi)

Population (2021)
  - Total: 1,159
  - Density: 3.3/km^{2} (8.5/sq mi)
  - Pop (2016–21): ▼0.2%
  - Dwellings: 778
- Time zone: UTC−5 (EST)
  - Summer (DST): UTC−4 (EDT)
- Postal code(s): J0W 1E0
- Area code: 819
- Website: www.grandremous.ca

Grand-Remous is a town and municipality in La Vallée-de-la-Gatineau Regional County Municipality, Quebec, Canada. The municipality is south of the Baskatong Reservoir, spanning both sides of the Gatineau River. The town is situated at the intersection of Route 117 and Route 105.

"Grand-Remous" is French for "great eddy" and is a reference to a large whirlpool on the Gatineau River near the Grand Remous Chute. This name matches the Atikamekw name "Obémiticwang", also meaning "choppy waters" or "big stir."

Its territory consists of low hills which vary between 200 meters (660 ft) and 380 meters (1,250 ft) above sea level, and which are partly cleared, mostly around Grand-Remous and along highway 105.

== History ==
The township municipality, formed in 1937, was first called Sicotte, named in honour of Louis-Victor Sicotte (1812-1889), County Deputy of Saint-Hyacinthe from 1857 to 1863. The local post office was also named Sicotte in 1927, but renamed to Grand-Remous in 1933. In 1973, the municipality changed its name to conform to the name of the village where the majority of the population lived.

On October 11, 2003, the Township Municipality of Grand-Remous became the Municipality of Grand-Remous.

== Demographics ==
Historical census populations – Grand-Remous

| Year | Pop. | ±% |
|---|---|---|
| 1941 | 310 | — |
| 1951 | 375 | +21.0% |
| 1956 | 893 | +138.1% |
| 1961 | 900 | +0.8% |
| 1966 | 872 | −3.1% |
| 1971 | 971 | +11.4% |
| 1976 | 1,029 | +6.0% |
| 1981 | 1,145 | +11.3% |

| Year | Pop. | ±% |
|---|---|---|
| 1986 | 1,161 | +1.4% |
| 1991 | 1,184 | +2.0% |
| 1996 | 1,257 | +6.2% |
| 2001 | 1,261 | +0.3% |
| 2006 | 1,249 | −1.0% |
| 2011 | 1,168 | −6.5% |
| 2016 | 1,161 | −0.6% |
| 2021 | 1,159 | −0.2% |

Includes revised count for 2001.
Source: Statistics Canada

Private dwellings occupied by usual residents (2021): 563 (out of 778 total)

Languages:

- English as first language: 5.6%
- French as first language: 90.7%
- English and French as first language: 1.6%
- Other as first language: 2.0%
