= Bois-Franc, Quebec =

Bois-Franc
- Municipality
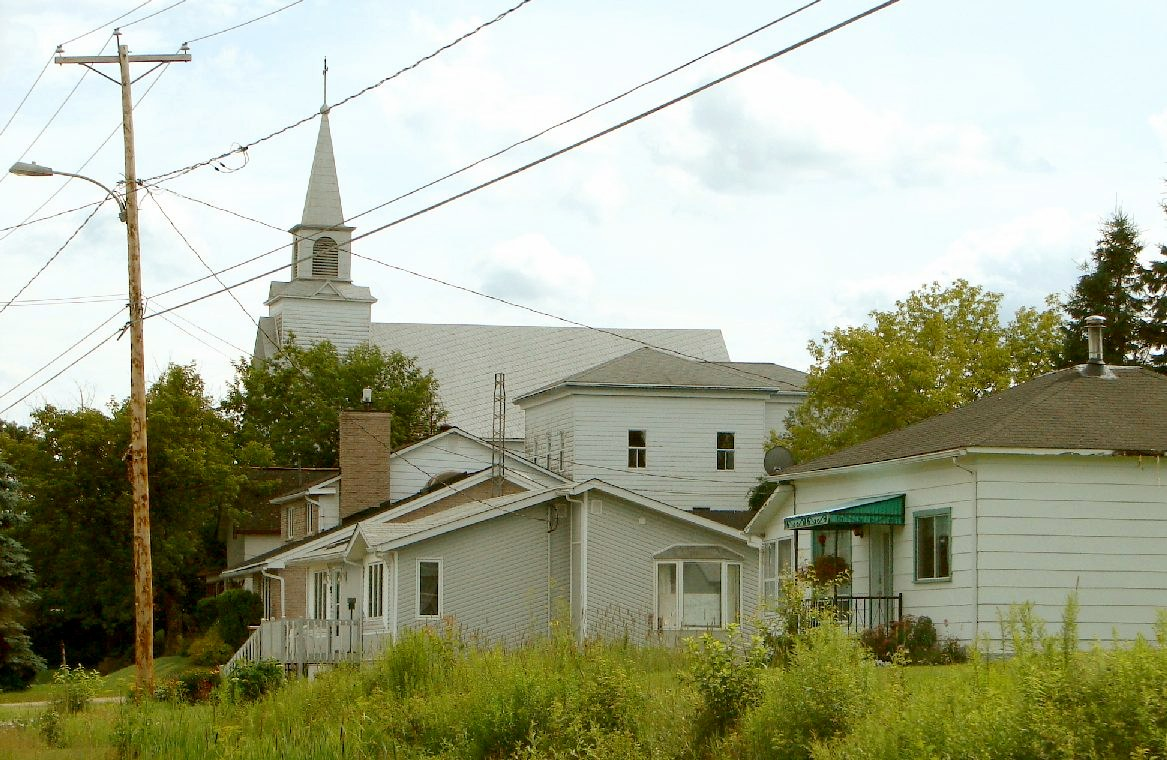

- Location in western Quebec
- Coordinates: 46°30′N 75°59′W
- Country: Canada
- Province: Quebec
- Region: Outaouais
- RCM: La Vallée-de-la-Gatineau
- Constituted: November 17, 1920

Government
  - Mayor: Julie Jolivette
  - Federal riding: Pontiac—Kitigan Zibi
  - Prov. riding: Gatineau

Area
  - Total: 74.31 km^{2} (28.69 sq mi)
  - Land: 71.56 km^{2} (27.63 sq mi)

Population (2021)
  - Total: 411
  - Density: 5.7/km^{2} (15/sq mi)
  - Pop (2016–21): ▼2.4%
  - Dwellings: 215
- Time zone: UTC−5 (EST)
  - Summer (DST): UTC−4 (EDT)
- Postal code(s): J9E 3A9
- Area code: 819
- Website: www.bois-franc.ca

Bois-Franc (French pronunciation: [bwa fʁɑ̃]) is a municipality in the La Vallée-de-la-Gatineau Regional County Municipality, Quebec, Canada, 15 kilometres (9.3 mi) north of Maniwaki. Its territory is along the western shores of the upper Gatineau River.

The adjective franc has its origin in the western regions of France and means "excellent, good, strong, solid, hard." Therefore, the name Bois-Franc can be translated as "hardwood" and is a reference to magnificent stands of hardwoods found within the municipality, including beech, ash, maple and birch.

== History ==
Its first European settlers came in 1870. Its post office, named Bois-Franc, opened in 1886. In 1920, the Municipality of Bois-Franc was founded when it separated from the Egan Municipality Township.

== Demographics ==
Historical census populations – Bois-Franc, Quebec

Year	Pop.	±%
1921	481	—
1931	461	−4.2%
1941	441	−4.3%
1951	406	−7.9%
1956	430	+5.9%
1961	409	−4.9%
1966	321	−21.5%
1976	358	+11.5%
1981	482	+34.6%

Year	Pop.	±%
1986	471	−2.3%
1991	437	−7.2%
1996	425	−2.7%
2001	422	−0.7%
2006	449	+6.4%
2011	447	−0.4%
2016	421	−5.8%
2021	411	−2.4%

Source: Statistics Canada

Private dwellings occupied by usual residents (2021): 192 (out of 215 total)

Languages:

- French as first language: 95.1%
- English as first language: 3.7%
- Other as first language: 0%

== Economy ==
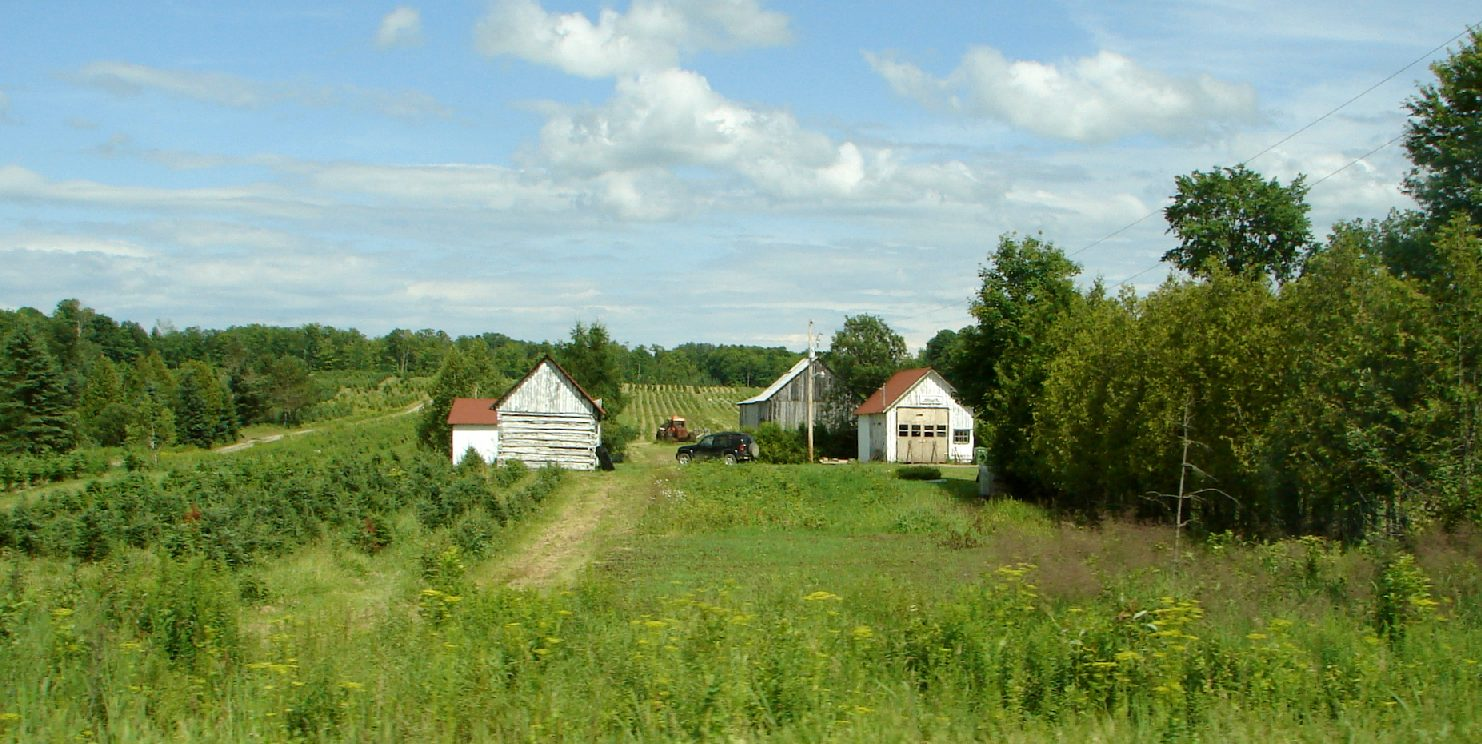
Rural scene in Bois-Franc

Its primary industry is logging and forestry. Industrial Park "Réjean Lafrenière" is home to the oriented strand board factory Louisiana-Pacific Canada ltd. Division Quebec; one of the largest plants of its kind in North America.

== Government ==
List of former mayors:

- Joseph Brosseau (1921–1923)
- Léon Lyrette (1923–1929)
- Arthur Branchaud (1929–1954)
- Jean-Claude Branchaud (1954–1977)
- Gabriel Pilon (1977–1987)
- Marcel Hubert (1987–1991)
- Neil Brennan (1991–1997)
- Joël Branchaud (1997–2003)
- Armand Hubert (2003–2013)
- Julie Jolivette (2013–present)
