= Blue Sea, Quebec =

Blue Sea
- Municipality
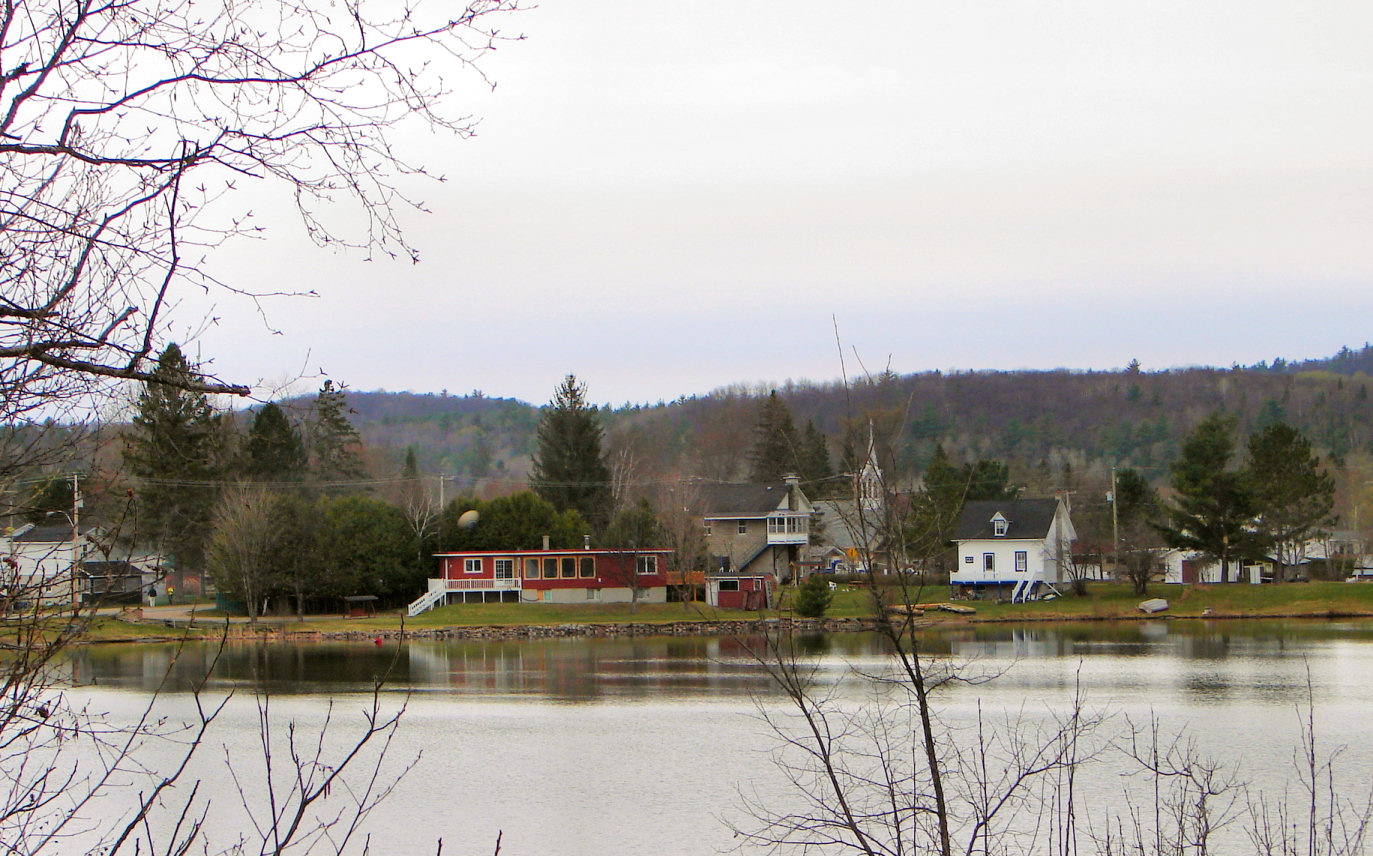

- Location in western Quebec
- Coordinates: 46°12′N 76°05′W
- Country: Canada
- Province: Quebec
- Region: Outaouais
- RCM: La Vallée-de-la-Gatineau
- Constituted: January 31, 1921

Government
  - Mayor: Laurent Fortin
  - Federal riding: Pontiac—Kitigan Zibi
  - Prov. riding: Gatineau

Area
  - Total: 87.52 km^{2} (33.79 sq mi)
  - Land: 72.97 km^{2} (28.17 sq mi)

Population (2021)
  - Total: 696
  - Density: 9.5/km^{2} (25/sq mi)
  - Pop (2016–21): ▲8.9%
  - Dwellings: 639
- Time zone: UTC−5 (EST)
  - Summer (DST): UTC−4 (EDT)
- Postal code(s): J0X 1C0
- Area code: 819
- Website: www.bluesea.ca

Blue Sea is a municipality in the Outaouais region of Quebec, Canada, and part of La Vallée-de-la-Gatineau Regional County Municipality. It encompasses the southern portion of Blue Sea Lake.

The village of Blue Sea is located at the extreme southern end of Blue Sea Lake, north of the larger city of Gracefield and south of Maniwaki.

== History ==
The Gauthier, Courchesne, Beaudoin, Lacroix, Tremblay, Fortin and Bénard were among the first European families to settle at the lake since the late nineteenth century. Almost at the same time, led by the construction of railways, the first vacationers established on the shores of the lake as well.

In 1921, the small location was first called Bouchette-South, then renamed to Blue Sea in 1931.

With the growth of tourism in the early 1940s, Blue Sea quickly became an attractive destination, which it has remained today.

== Demographics ==
Historical census populations – Blue Sea, Quebec

Year	Pop.	±%
1976	472	—
1981	489	+3.6%
1986	508	+3.9%
1991	520	+2.4%
1996	595	+14.4%

Year	Pop.	±%
2001	570	−4.2%
2006	608	+6.7%
2011	674	+10.9%
2016	639	−5.2%
2021	696	+8.9%

Source: Statistics Canada

Dwellings (2021):

- Total private dwellings: 639
- Private dwellings occupied by usual residents: 359

Languages:

- English as first language: 6.6%
- French as first language: 93.4%
