= Kazabazua River =

Kazabazua River Rivière Kazabazua
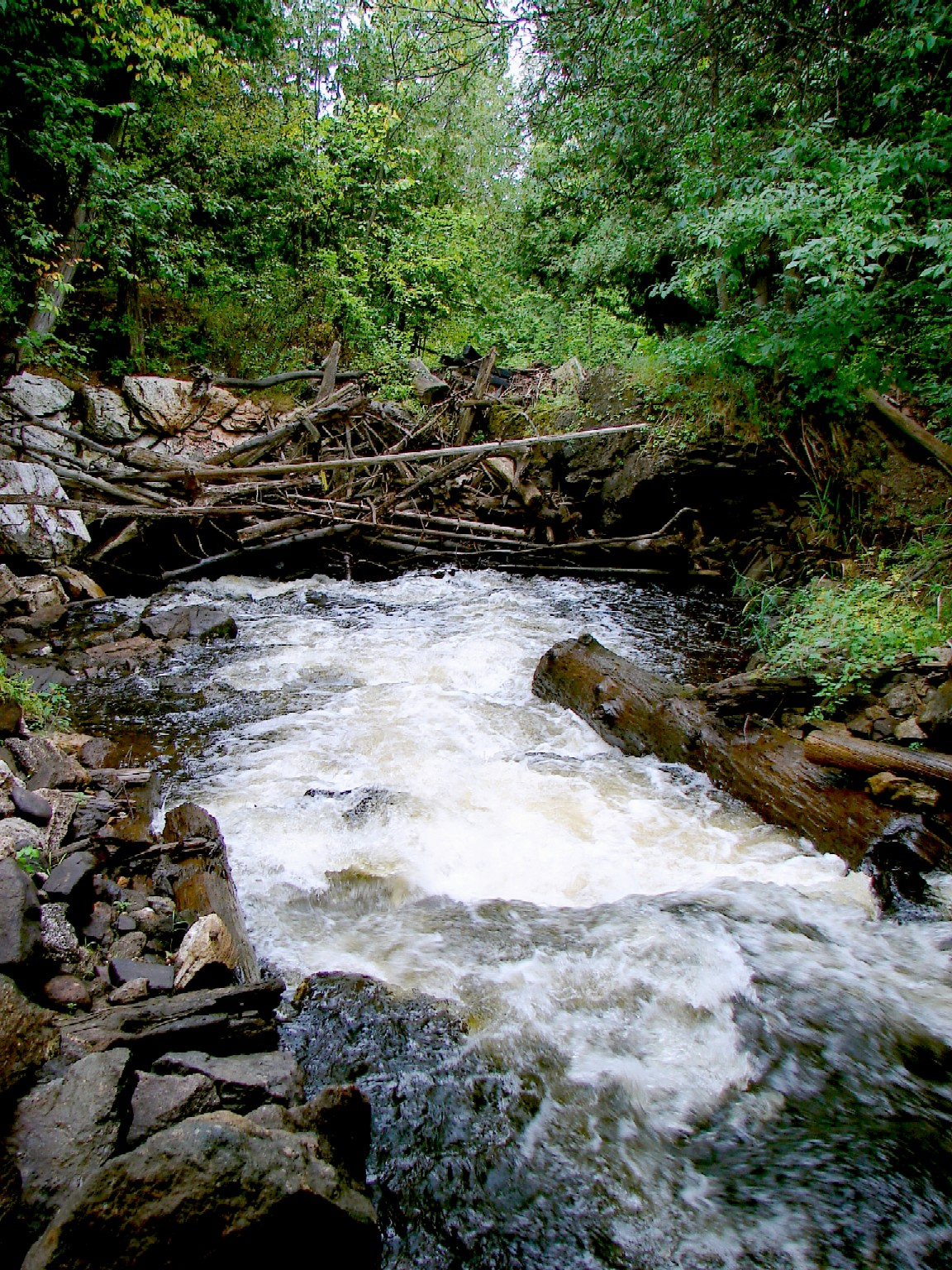
- The Kazabazua River disappearing underground.

Location
- Country: Canada
- Province: Quebec
- Region: Outaouais

Physical characteristics
- Mouth: Gatineau River
  - location: Kazabazua
  - coordinates: 45°56′53″N 75°58′23″W

Basin features
- Progression: Gatineau→ Ottawa→ St. Lawrence→ Gulf of St. Lawrence
- River system: Ottawa River drainage basin

The Kazabazua River is a tributary of the Gatineau River in western Quebec, Canada.

The river gives its name to Kazabazua, a village in La Vallée-de-la-Gatineau Regional County Municipality. Derived from the Algonquin language, the name of this river has had many spellings including "Kazaluzu", "Kasubasua", "Cazabasua", "Cazibazouis", "Cazebalzuac", and "Cajibajouis". The name is said to be derived from kachibadjiwan (kach meaning "hidden" and djiwan meaning "current")—a reflection of local topography as the Kazabazua briefly becomes an underground river before resurfacing a few dozen metres downstream. The river then flows through rapids and passes under a natural stone bridge.

== Geography ==
The geography of Kazabazua River includes calcitic marble containing crystals of graphite and grossular garnet. The marble has been chemically and mechanically eroded by water from the river to form a karst stone bridge. The inclusion of gneiss in the marble illustrates erosion differential.

Both this river and Picanoc River flow directly through local towns and are used for recreational activities such as fishing, rowing, and swimming. Cottages and homes are along the riverbanks. The pollution of the Gatineau, Kazabazua, and Pontiac rivers by both treated and untreated leachate has been a recent concern and "could have devastating effects upon residents and tourism throughout the region." One third of the local watershed—including any toxic effluent that might be present—flows into the Kazabazua River system. When water levels rise, the Kazabazua and Pontiac rivers sometimes back up into Lac Shea causing pollutants that they carry end up in this lake. The Kazabuza and Picanoc rivers are among several local bodies of water in Pontiac Regional County Municipality in which delicate aquatic and semi-aquatic animals such as wood turtles have been studied.

== See also ==
- List of rivers of Quebec
