= East Aldfield =

Small hamlet in Outaouais region of Quebec, Canada

Coordinates: 45°44′45″N 76°11′00″W

East Aldfield is a small hamlet in the Outaouais region of Quebec, Canada, part of the Municipality of La Pêche. It is located approximately 60 kilometres northwest of Ottawa, on the Cleo Fournier Road, north of the intersection with Quebec Route 366.
