= La Pêche River =

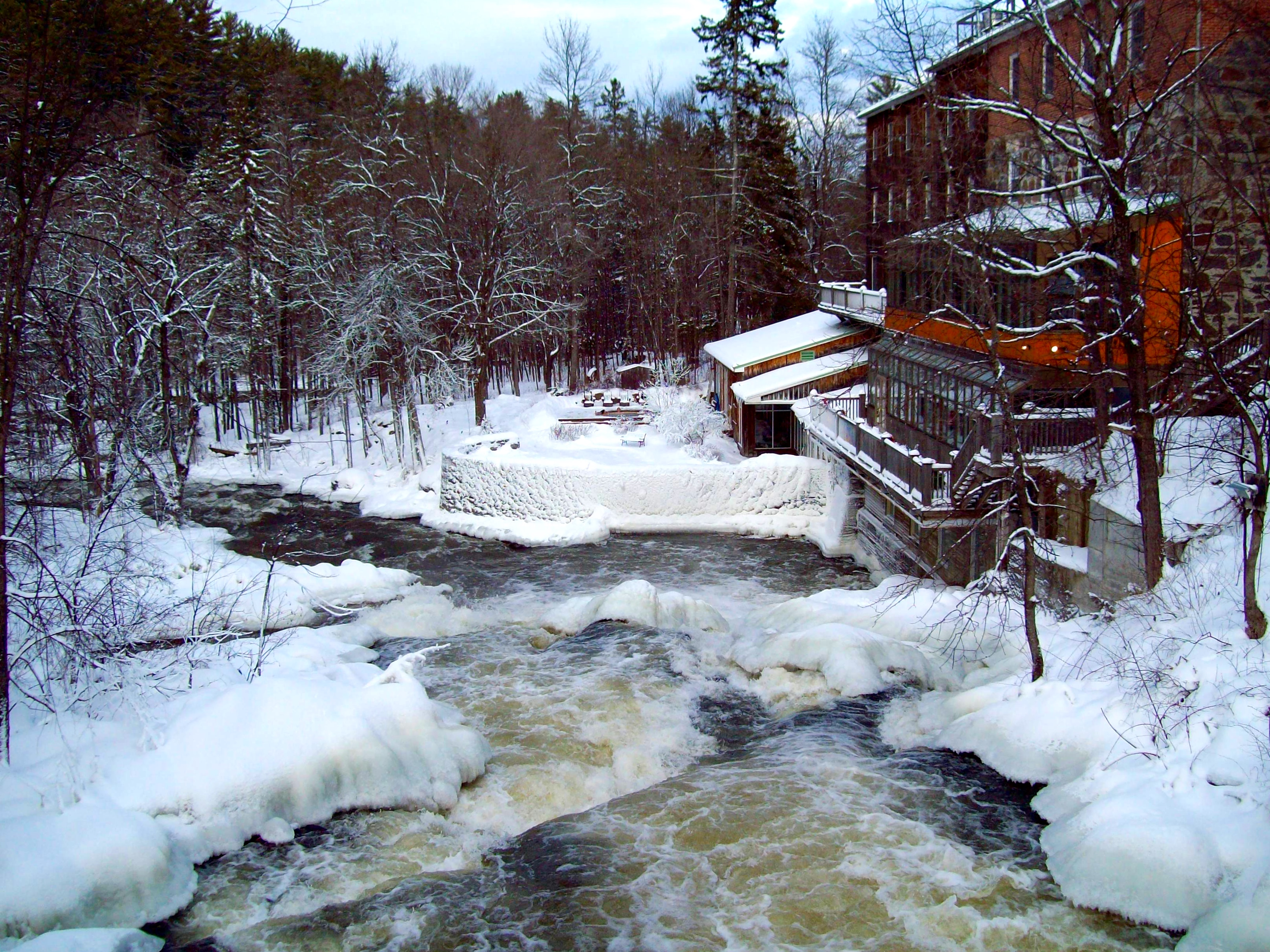
- La Pêche River at Wakefield

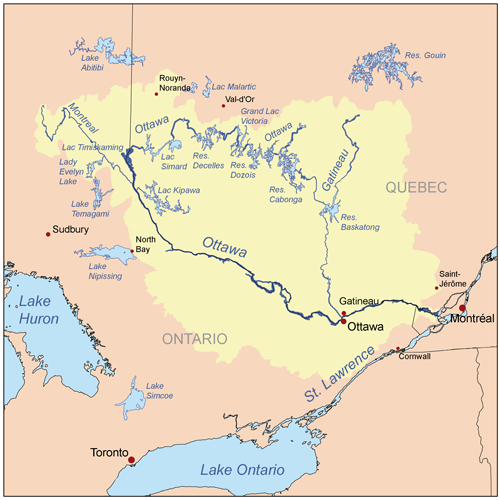
- Map of the Ottawa River drainage basin
- Native name: Rivière La Pêche (French)

Location
- Country: Canada
- Province: Quebec
- Region: Outaouais
- Regional county: Les Collines-de-l'Outaouais Regional County Municipality

Physical characteristics
- Source: La Pêche Lake
  - location: Pontiac
  - coordinates: 45°37′36″N 76°11′21″W
- Mouth: Gatineau River
  - location: Wakefield
  - coordinates: 45°38′14″N 75°55′48″W
- Length: 20 km (12 mi)
- Discharge
  - location: Wakefield

The La Pêche River (French: Rivière la Pêche) is a river in western Quebec, in Canada, which drains La Pêche Lake (Lac La Pêche) in Gatineau Park and empties into the Gatineau River at Wakefield.

== Geography ==
The south shore of La Pêche Lake is just 7.5 kilometres (4.7 mi) north of the Ottawa River. The mouth of the lake is at 17.5 kilometres (10.9 mi) in direct line from the mouth of the La Pêche river.

From its source at La Pêche Lake in the Pontiac municipality, the La Pêche River flows for about 20 kilometres (12 mi) to the east, partly in the Gatineau Park, sometimes in woodlands, agricultural or urban. La Pêche Lake receives water discharges of several lakes (to the west and north), including: Martin, Serpent, à Guilbeault, Fisher, Trois Monts, Malverson, du Loup and La Loutre. The mouth of La Pêche Lake is at its northern end.

La Pêche river flows towards the north-east, then east, where it will run along more or less the 366 West Main Road to its mouth. On its way to the east, La Pêche River collects various branches dumps lakes:

- South side - Branch of Eardley, including lakes: Ben, Hawley, Blind, Ramsay, Kidder, Gervais, Richard and Leblanc;
- South side - Branch of "chemin du lac-Philipe" (Road of Lake-Philipe), including lakes: Racine, Monette and Kingbury;
- North side - Outlet of lake Gingras.
- North side - Branch of Kennedy Road, particularly lakes: Gauvreau, Jean-Venne, Anderson and Kennedy;
- North side - Branch of "chemin Horace-Cross" (Road Horace-Cross), particularly lakes: Wills, Fraser and Bell.

La Pêche river empties into the Gatineau River at 1.2 kilometres (0.75 mi) south of the covered bridge of Wakefield, northern sector of the city of Gatineau, and 27 kilometres (17 mi) upstream of the mouth of the Gatineau River in Ottawa River.

== Toponymy ==
At the beginning of the 19th century, Joseph Bureau, among other explorers, described this lake as a very fishy lake, abounding especially pike and trout. Accessibility of La Pêche Lake, near the Ottawa River and Ottawa city, in (Ontario), favoured sport fishing.

The toponym "La Pêche River" was recorded as of December 24, 1976, at the "Bank of place names" in Commission de toponymie du Québec (Geographical Names Board of Québec). The toponyms of the lake and river are related together.

== History ==
A grain mill was built in 1838 on the river at MacLaren Falls near Wakefield and is now operated as an inn, the Moulin Wakefield Inn and Spa. A textile mill and a sawmill at the same location helped to provide the impetus for the development of a settlement at Wakefield.

== See also ==
- List of Quebec rivers
- Les Collines-de-l'Outaouais Regional County Municipality
