= Messines, Quebec =

Messines
- Municipality
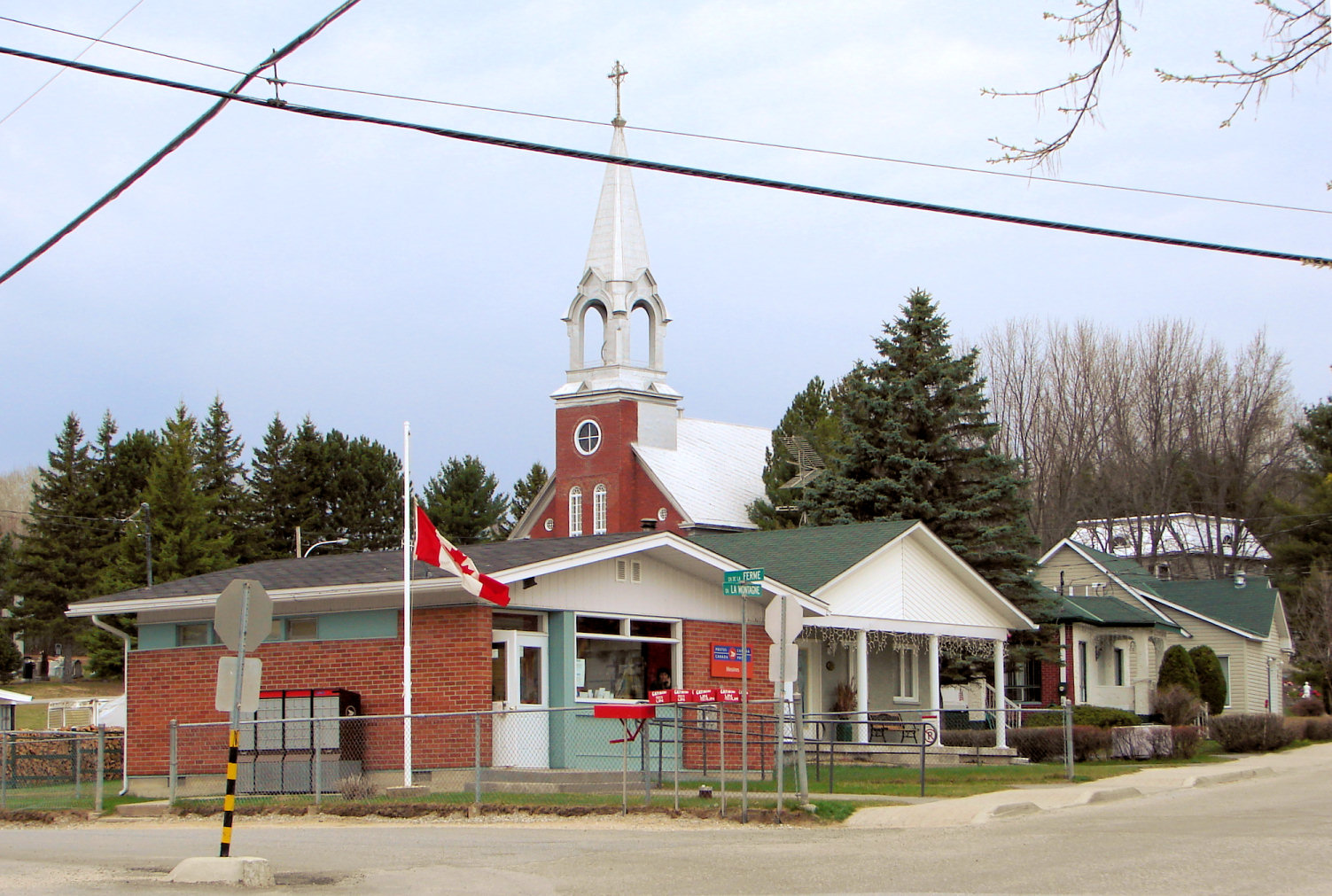

- Location in western Quebec
- Coordinates: 46°14′N 76°01′W
- Country: Canada
- Province: Quebec
- Region: Outaouais
- RCM: La Vallée-de-la-Gatineau
- Constituted: August 19, 1921

Government
  - Mayor: Ronald Cross
  - Federal riding: Pontiac—Kitigan Zibi
  - Prov. riding: Gatineau

Area
  - Total: 129.48 km^{2} (49.99 sq mi)
  - Land: 110.11 km^{2} (42.51 sq mi)

Population (2021)
  - Total: 1,655
  - Density: 15/km^{2} (39/sq mi)
  - Pop (2016–21): ▲0.1%
  - Dwellings: 1,047
- Time zone: UTC−5 (EST)
  - Summer (DST): UTC−4 (EDT)
- Postal code(s): J0X 2J0
- Area code: 819
- Website: www.messines.ca

Messines is a municipality in the Canadian province of Quebec. It includes the population centres of Messines and Farley.

Maniwaki Airport is located in Messines.

== History ==
Settlement began in 1840, and the village came to be known as Burbidge or Burbridge by 1906, named after Deputy Minister of Justice George Wheelock Burbidge. Further development resulted from agriculture and forestry, and consolidation of the community, at the start of the 1900s, was thanks to the arrival of the railway, which for more than a century connected Hull (Gatineau) to Maniwaki. The Saint-Raphaël parish was legally constituted in 1906.

On August 19, 1921, the municipality was established when it separated from the Township Municipality of Bouchette. Although the new municipality was named after Messines, Belgium (in honour of the Canadians who fought there during World War I), it was misspelled as Messine (no "s") when incorporated. It was not until 1986 when this was officially corrected. The first municipal council was elected in 1921 with Louis Lécuyer as its first mayor.

In the middle of the 20th century, Messines was very active in growing potatoes thanks to its sandy soil, ideal for extensive exploitation of this staple. For many years, an important agricultural co-operative was formed between the local and regional farmers of the day. The original main building of the co-op today houses a sawmill. During the second half of the century, the municipality’s economy gradually changed to tourism and cottagers, thanks to the presence of its magnificent lakes. Some of the more popular ones are: Blue Sea Lake, Big Cedar and Little Cedar Lakes. There are also many forested areas which allow for outdoor activities throughout the year. Today, the municipality is also known for its hunting and fishing territories, and for a wide variety of recreational activities available all year long.

== Demographics ==
Canada census – Messines community profile

	2021	2016
Population	1,655 (+2.9% from 2016)	1,609 (+0.1% from 2011)
Land area	110.11 km^{2} (42.51 sq mi)	111.97 km^{2} (43.23 sq mi)
Population density	15/km^{2} (39/sq mi)	14.4/km^{2} (37/sq mi)
Median age	52.8 (M: 53.6, F: 52.8)	50.8 (M: 50.9, F: 50.8)
Private dwellings	1,047 (total) 787 (occupied)	1,057 (total)
Median household income	$68,500	$57,152

References: 2021 2016

Historical census populations – Messines, Quebec

Year	Pop.	±%
1976	993	—
1981	1,164	+17.2%
1986	1,177	+1.1%
1991	1,249	+6.1%
1996	1,517	+21.5%

Year	Pop.	±%
2001	1,322	−12.9%
2006	1,610	+21.8%
2011	1,608	−0.1%
2016	1,609	+0.1%
2021	1,655	+2.9%

Source: Statistics Canada

== Local government ==
List of former mayors:

- 2001: Ronald Cross (current)
- 1997–2001: Normand St-Jacques
- 1993–1997: Ronald Cross
- 1987–1993: Marc Beaulieu
- 1985–1987: Joseph Mayer
- 1983–1985: Marcel Lévesque
- 1978–1983: Léo Lafontaine
- 1977–1978: Viateur Saumure
- 1972–1977: Jean-Louis Latourelle
- 1971–1972: Rolland Jolivette
- 1968–1971: Jean-Paul Dault
- 1965–1968: Rolland Jolivette
- 1961–1965: Oscar St-Jacques
- 1953–1961: Ludger Beaudoin
- 1951–1953: Alexandre Lafrenière
- 1947–1951: Oscar St-Jacques
- 1945–1947: Alexandre Lafrenière
- 1943–1945: Anastase Saumure
- 1942–1943: Frank Nault
- 1937–1941: Alexandre Lafrenière
- 1935–1937: Louis Lécuyer
- 1933–1935: Alexandre Lafrenière
- 1931–1933: Ernest Noël
- 1929–1931: Harmidas Latourelle
- 1928–1929: Louis Corbeil
- 1926–1927: Louis Lécuyer
- 1923–1926: Louis Corbeil
- 1921–1923: Louis Lécuyer
