= Rupert, Quebec =

Rupert
- Location within Quebec
- Coordinates: 45°41′10″N 75°59′32.1″W
- Country: Canada
- Province: Quebec

Rupert is a village located about 10 kilometers NNW of Wakefield, Quebec, at the convergence of the Shouldice Road and Maple Drive.

On December 9, 1944, a fire destroyed the Rupert General Store. The article from the Evening Citizen (now the Ottawa Citizen) on that date reads: "Fire Razes Home And Rupert General Store. WAKEFIELD, Dec, 9 -(Special)- Despite a determined effort by neighbors to extinguish the blaze, a fire of undetermined origin destroyed the general store and home of Wes Shouldice at Rupert, Que, about five o'clock this morning. No estimate of the damage could be obtained but the loss is said to be partly covered by insurance. The fire started in the store and quickly spread to the home next door. Immediately the blaze was noticed, residents formed a bucket brigade to combat the flames. None of the stock could be removed from the store but several household articles were taken from the burning home."

Rupert has an ice rink, community center, and a library. It is served by a United Church located in the village.
