= La Pêche Lake =

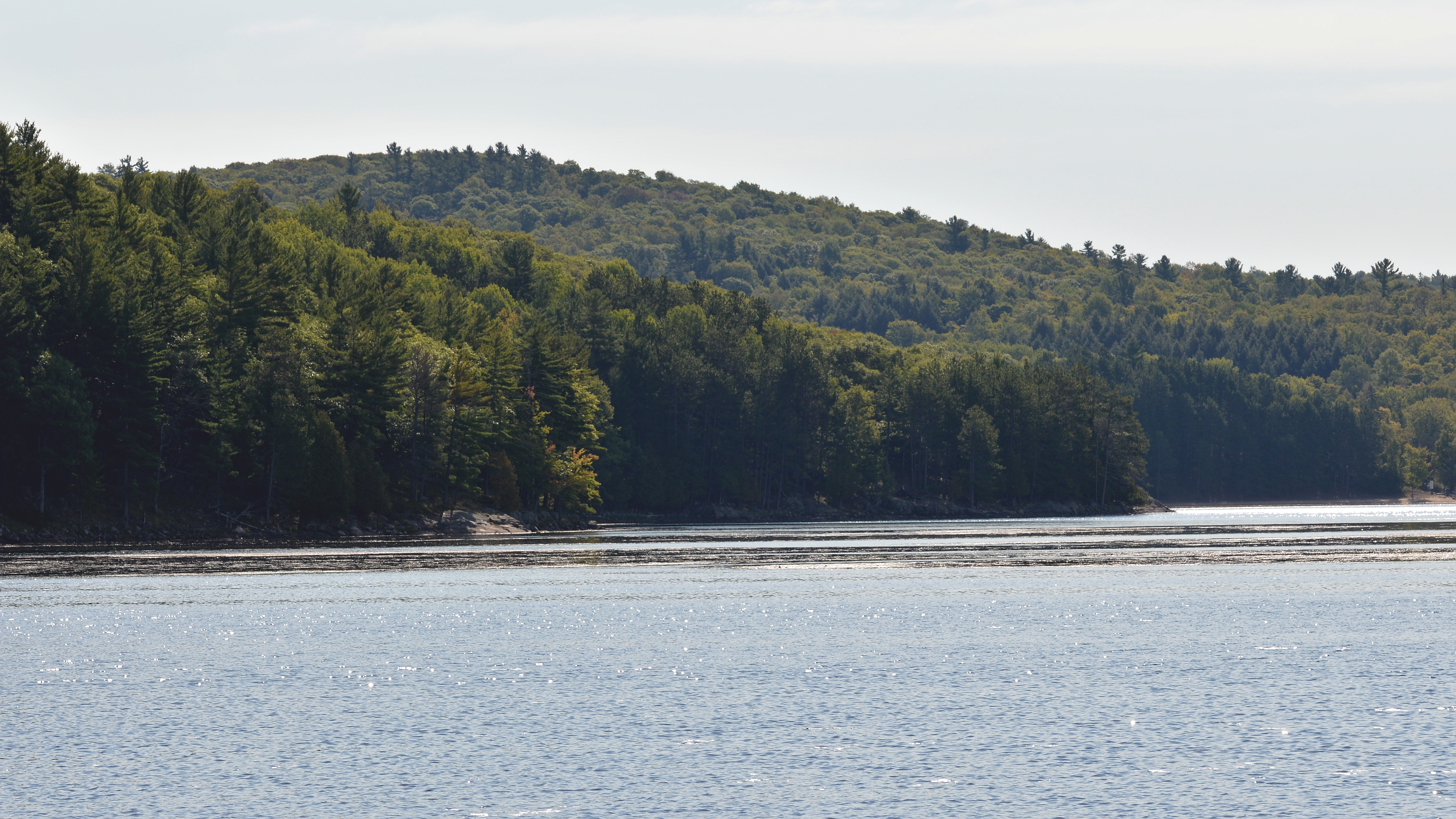
- Lac la Pêche, Gatineau Park

- Location within Quebec
- Location: Gatineau Park, Quebec, Canada
- Coordinates: 45.62364°N 76.18658°W
- Type: lake

La Pêche Lake is a lake in Gatineau Park, Quebec, Canada. It lies in the northwest part of the municipality of Pontiac, in Les Collines-de-l'Outaouais Regional County Municipality.

== See also ==
- Gatineau Park
- Wakefield, municipality
- Pontiac, municipality
- La Pêche River
