= Picanoc River =

Coordinates: 46°04′26″N 76°03′19″W

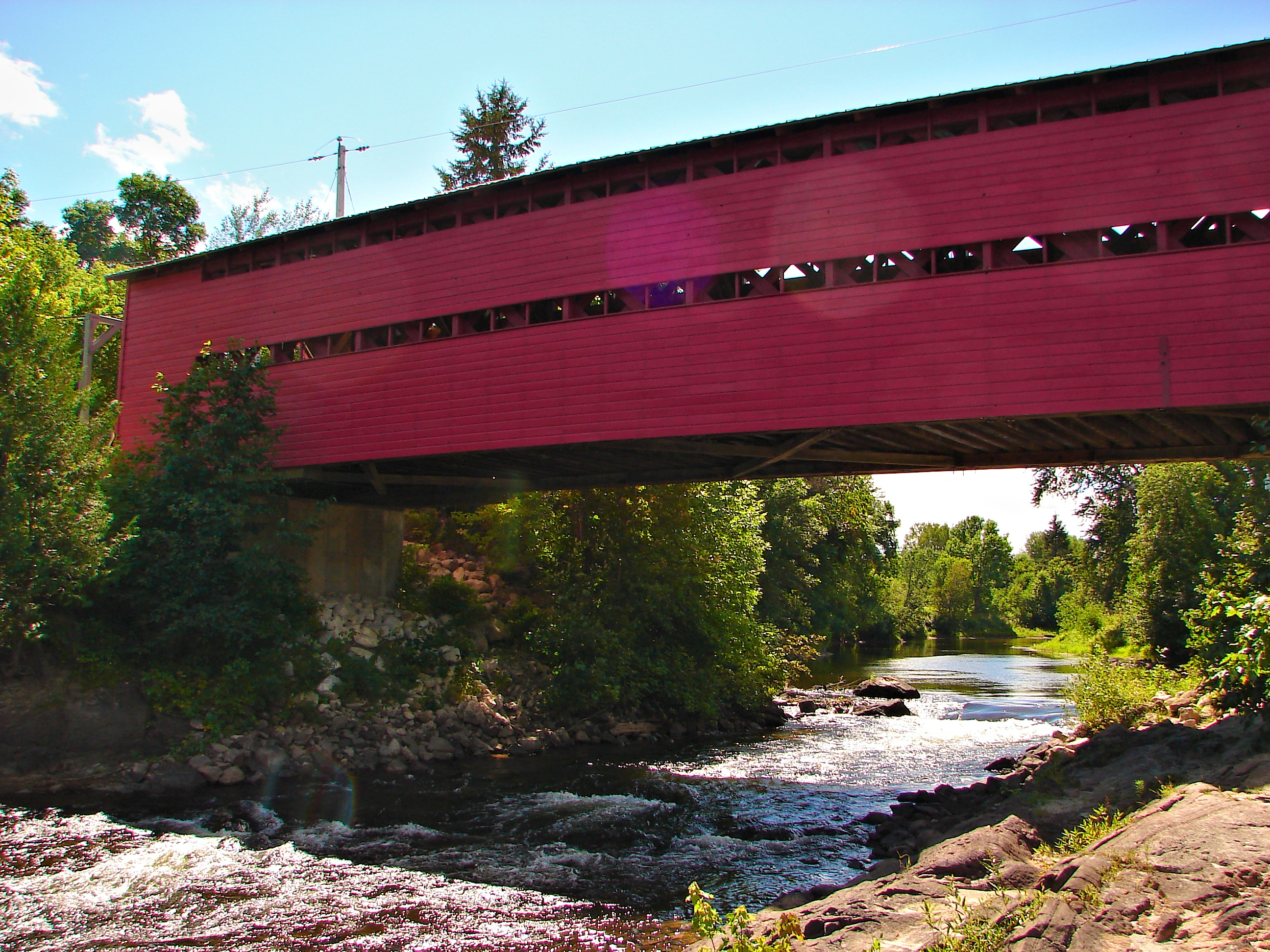
- Covered bridge over the Picanoc River west of Gracefield

Location
- Country: Canada
- Province: Quebec
- Region: Outaouais

Physical characteristics
- Mouth: Gatineau River
  - location: Gracefield, La Vallée-de-la-Gatineau Regional County Municipality
- Length: 85 km (53 mi)

Basin features
- Progression: Gatineau→ Ottawa→ St. Lawrence→ Gulf of St. Lawrence
- River system: Ottawa River drainage basin

The Picanoc River (pikanak or pakânâk) is a tributary of the Gatineau River in the administrative region of Outaouais of Quebec, Canada.

The Picanoc River begins in the unorganized territory of Lac-Nilgaut, Quebec in Pontiac Regional County Municipality and ends in Gracefield in La Vallée-de-la-Gatineau Regional County Municipality.

== Geography ==
Its headwaters originate 10 kilometres (6.2 mi) southeast of Lake Usborne and north of Lac Dumont in Pontiac County. It generally flows eastward by making a large loop to the south for a distance of 85 kilometres (53 mi). The Picanoc then widens forming Lac à la Loutre (Otter Lake) and discharges into Gatineau River at Wright (South of Gracefield municipality), in the MRC of La Vallée-de-la-Gatineau Regional County Municipality. It is part of Saint Lawrence River/Gulf of Saint Lawrence watershed.

Narrow and tumultuous, it is highly regarded by outdoor enthusiasts. It is 95 kilometres (59 mi) long, a class/grade II river with sections reaching class/grade III difficulty (based upon the International Scale of River Difficulty).

== Historical and topographical landmarks ==
According to Eugène Rouillard (1906) quoting Father Georges Lemoine, "Pikanook" or "Picanock" is a variant of "pakanak", "walnut", of "Pakan", nuts, probably so named because of the nuts found there. Probably around this river were populated walnut, a wood prized by Native Americans for making their bows. The spelling and pronunciation of the Native American name underwent several consecutive changes to language contact. Thus do we find the form on a map Pikanook 1906 Wright Township, Pickanok on that of the Ministry of Mines and Fisheries of 1925 and on the Pickinock County Hull, also from 1925.

The current form "Picanoc" appears on a map of the Department of Lands and Forests in 1927. Picanoc also means a bridge, three lanes of communication and a small stream; the term was also used in the old name of the municipality of Gracefield.

The place name "River Picanoc" was formalized December 5, 1968, by the Commission de toponymie du Québec (Quebec Names Board).

== See also ==
- Gracefield, Quebec, a municipality
- Kazabazua River, a river
- Ottawa River, a river
