= Gracefield, Quebec =

Gracefield
- City
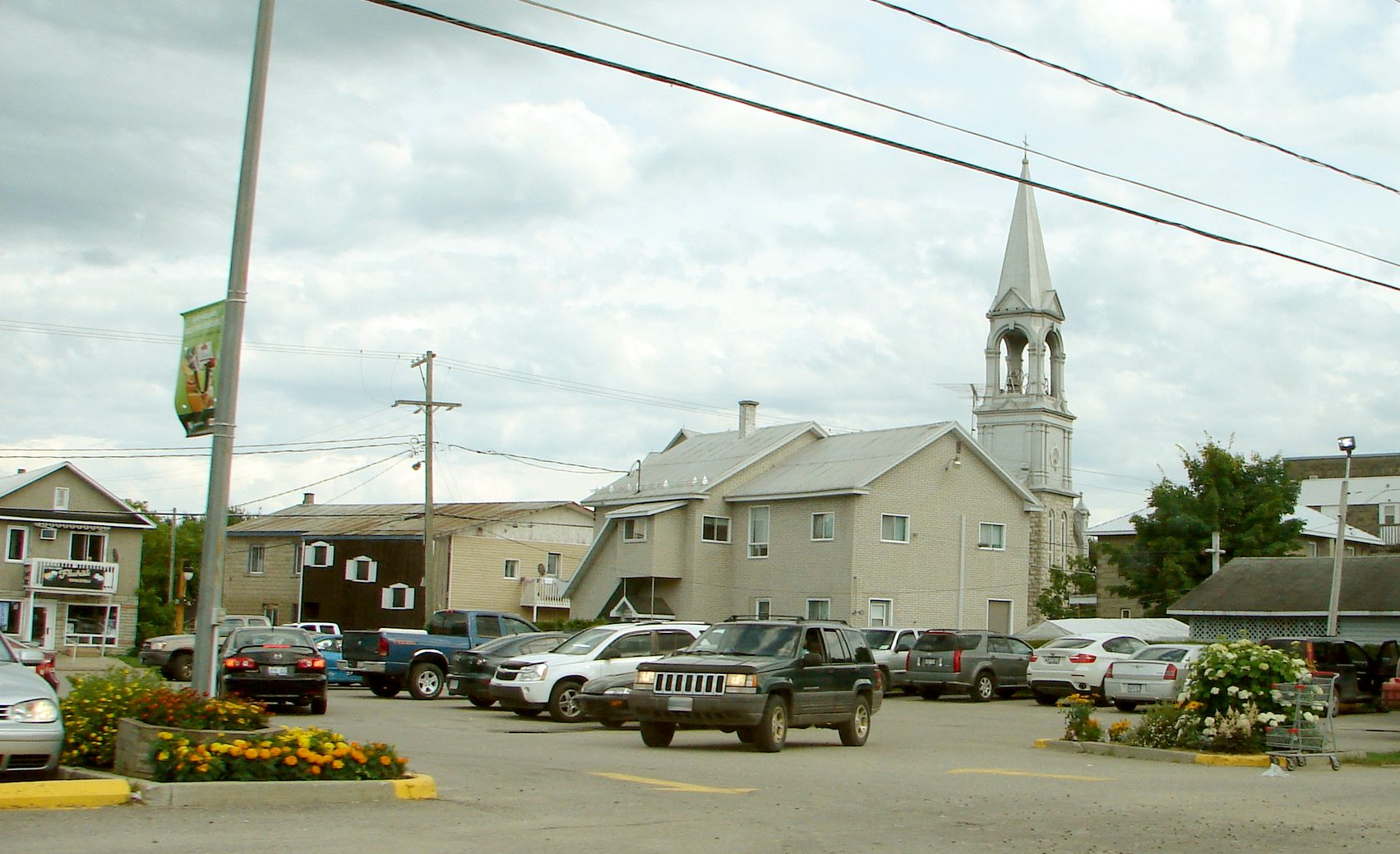

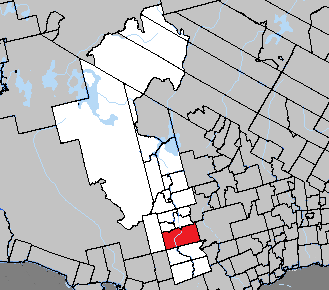
- Location within La Vallée-de-la-Gatineau RCM

- Location in western Quebec
- Coordinates: 46°06′N 76°03′W
- Country: Canada
- Province: Quebec
- Region: Outaouais
- RCM: La Vallée-de-la-Gatineau
- Constituted: March 13, 2002

Government
  - Mayor: Mathieu Caron
  - Federal riding: Pontiac—Kitigan Zibi
  - Prov. riding: Gatineau

Area
  - Total: 454.85 km^{2} (175.62 sq mi)
  - Land: 380.94 km^{2} (147.08 sq mi)

Population (2021)
  - Total: 2,376
  - Density: 6.2/km^{2} (16/sq mi)
  - Pop (2016–21): ▼3.5%
  - Dwellings: 1,880
- Time zone: UTC−5 (EST)
  - Summer (DST): UTC−4 (EDT)
- Postal code(s): J0X 1W0
- Area code: 819
- Highways: R-105
- Website: www.gracefield.ca

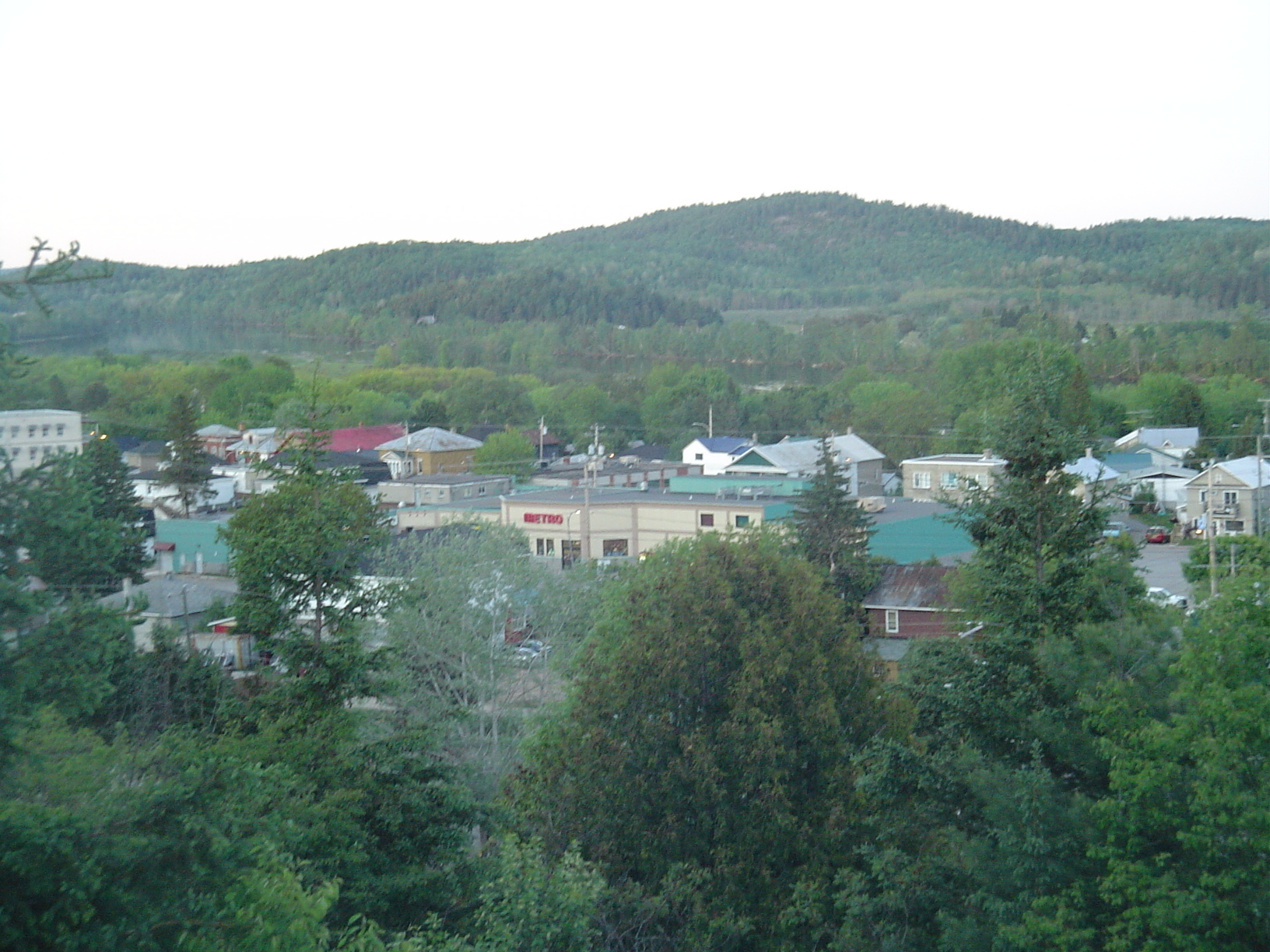
Gracefield in 2007

Gracefield is a city in La Vallée-de-la-Gatineau Regional County Municipality in the Outaouais region of Quebec, Canada. It was reorganized on 13 March 2002 when three former municipalities (Gracefield, Northfield, and Wright) were merged into one.

Its name comes from Patrick Grace who opened there the first business and was mayor of Wright from 1885 to 1890.

Gracefield is located along the Gatineau River and Picanoc River. Its area is dotted with many lakes, most of which are lined with numerous summer camps and cottages.

== History ==
In 1840, Augustin Ethier, originally from Saint-Martin on Île Jésus, became the first settler in Gracefield. Settlers built the first church in 1841 which also served as school during the week. In 1845, Gracefield counted 20 families forming a small village core. New families settled on the banks of the Gatineau River, in what would become Northfield, which was at that time the periphery of the village in the canton of Wright.

Since the beginning of colonization, the population of these three municipalities lived in close relation, always sharing multiple services and infrastructure. Therefore, it was logical to reorganize them into one municipality in 2002, called Wright-Gracefield-Northfield and renamed to Gracefield on 22 February 2003.

The great flood of 1974 is an event remembered by the local population. On May 14, 1974, the waters of the Gatineau river and lakes linked to the River overflowed. The water rose at a rate of three to six inches an hour. Many residences in the Gracefield area were flooded and approximately 50% of the village had to be evacuated. Although no one was injured, damages reached many millions of dollars.

On June 23, 2010, Gracefield was struck by a magnitude 5.0 earthquake that rocked Central Canada. A state of emergency was declared after several buildings were damaged, including the church, some of the city's administration buildings and the Vimy Hotel.

Gracefield had many mica mines in the late 19th century to early 20th century but they have now all closed. There has been some interest in mining zinc since discovering an important quantity in Wright around the Calument Road area corner of the 105 provincial Road.

The Canadian Pacific Maniwaki subdivision linked Gracefield with Wakefield, but it was abandoned in 1986.

== Demographics ==
In the 2021 Census of Population conducted by Statistics Canada, Gracefield had a population of 2,376 living in 1,131 of its 1,880 total private dwellings, a change of −3.5% from its 2016 population of 2,462. With a land area of 380.94 km^{2} (147.08 sq mi), it had a population density of 6.2/km^{2} (16.2/sq mi) in 2021.

Canada census – Gracefield community profile

	2021	2016
Population	2,376 (-3.5% from 2016)	2,462 (4.5% from 2011)
Land area	380.94 km^{2} (147.08 sq mi)	386.84 km^{2} (149.36 sq mi)
Population density	6.2/km^{2} (16/sq mi)	6.4/km^{2} (17/sq mi)
Median age	54.8 (M: 55.2, F: 54.0)	52.4 (M: 52.6, F: 52.1)
Private dwellings	1,880 (total) 1,131 (occupied)	2,069 (total)
Median household income	$57,600	$44,544

References: 2021 2016

Historical census populations – Gracefield, Quebec
Year	Pop.	±%
2006	2,439	—
2011	2,355	−3.4%
2016	2,462	+4.5%
2021	2,376	−3.5%
Source: Statistics Canada

Populations prior to amalgamation:

- Populations in 2001:
  - Gracefield: 615
  - Northfield: 521
  - Wright: 1137
- Population in 1996:
  - Gracefield: 713
  - Northfield: 516
  - Wright: 1202
- Population in 1991:
  - Gracefield: 703
  - Northfield: 514
  - Wright: 1157

Mother tongue (2021):

- English as first language: 9.6%
- French as first language: 86.8%
- English and French as first language: 2.6%
- Other as first language: 1.3%

== Local government ==
List of former mayors since formation of current city:

- Yves Côté (2002–2005)
- Réal Rochon (2005–2013, 2017–2021)
- Joanne Poulin (2013–2017)
- Mathieu Caron (2021–present)

== See also ==
- List of anglophone communities in Quebec
