= Little Cedar Lake =

Lake in Messines, Quebec, Canada

- Location within Quebec
- Location: Messines / Kitigan Zibi, La Vallée-de-la-Gatineau Regional County Municipality, Quebec
- Coordinates: 46°17′30″N 76°04′48″W
- Basin countries: Canada
- Max. length: 2.5 mi (4.0 km)
- Max. width: 0.6 mi (0.97 km)
- Max. depth: 120 ft (37 m)

Little Cedar Lake (or Petit lac des Cèdres) is a 2.5 mile-long lake located in Messines, Quebec, 90 minutes from Ottawa. Recreational activities include swimming, fishing and watersports. It is a very shallow and sandy area in parts, but is 120 feet deep in spots with crystal clean water, with lake trout sitting around 80 feet in the summer. There is also bass and pike fishing.

== See also ==
- List of lakes in Canada
