= Gatineau River =

River in western Quebec, Canada

Gatineau River Rivière Gatineau
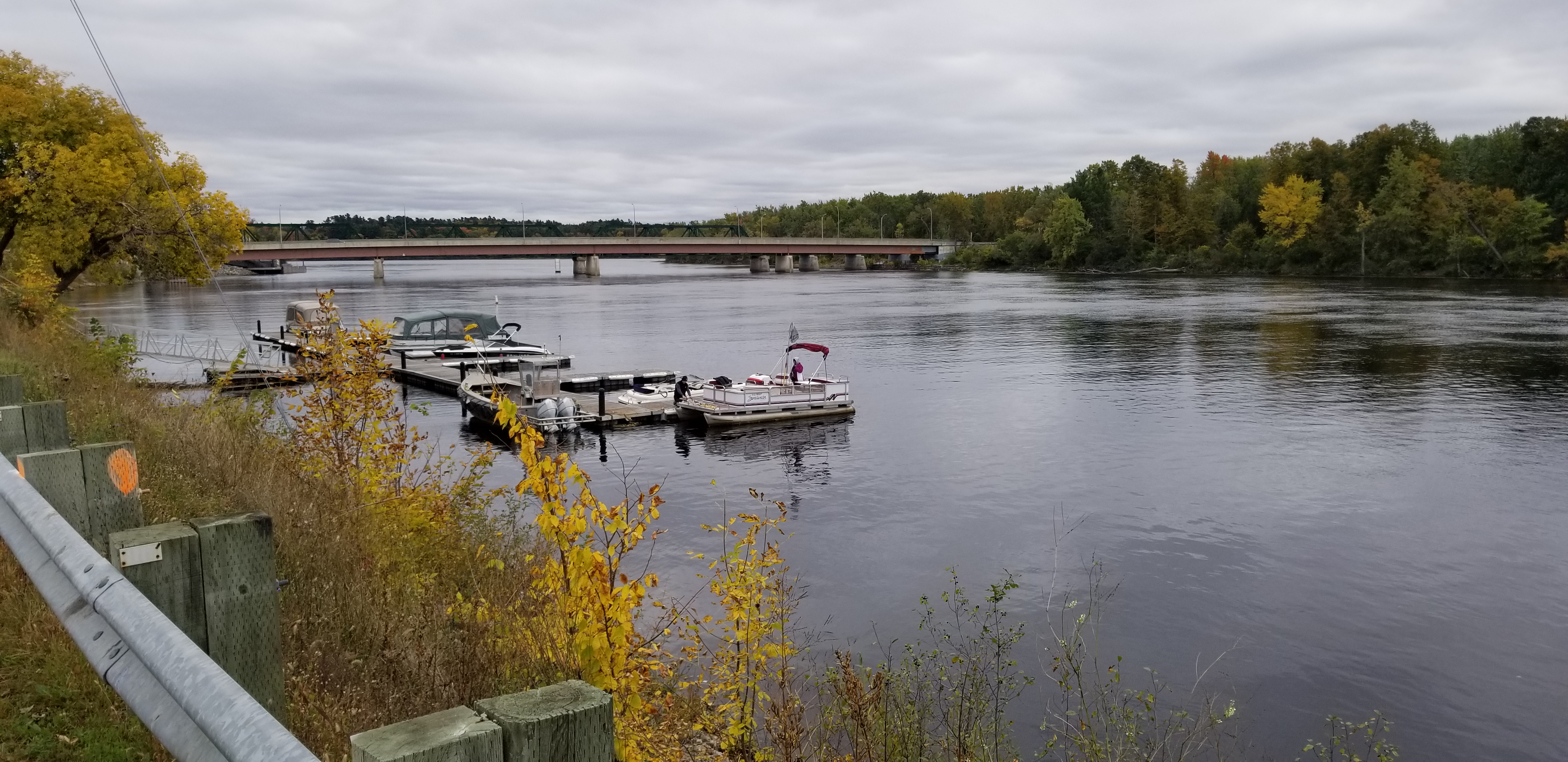
- Lady-Aberdeen bridge in City of Gatineau

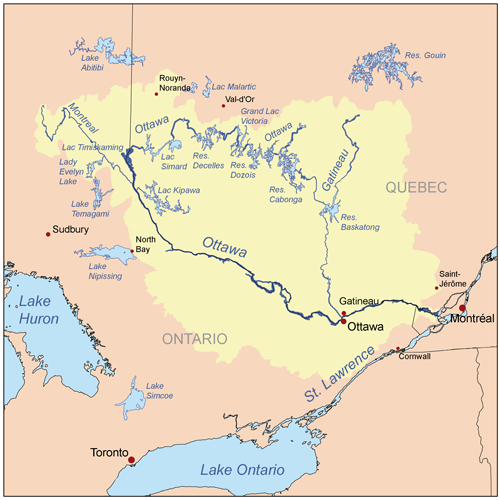
- Map of the Ottawa River drainage basin with the Gatineau River

Location
- Country: Canada
- Province: Quebec
- Region: Outaouais

Physical characteristics
- Source: Unnamed wilderness
  - location: near boundary between Outaouais and Mauricie regions
- Mouth: Ottawa River
  - location: City of Gatineau
  - coordinates: 45°27′15″N 75°41′42″W
- Length: 386 km (240 mi)
- Basin size: 23,724 km^{2} (9,160 sq mi)
- Discharge
  - location: Paugan Power Station
  - average: 350 m^{3}/s (12,000 cu ft/s)

Basin features
- Progression: Ottawa River→ St. Lawrence River→ Gulf of St. Lawrence
- River system: Ottawa River drainage basin

The Gatineau River (French: Rivière Gatineau, pronounced [gatino]) is a river in western Quebec, Canada, which rises in lakes north of the Baskatong Reservoir and flows south to join the Ottawa River at the city of Gatineau, Quebec. The river is 386 kilometres (240 mi) long and drains an area of 23,700 square kilometres (9,200 sq mi).

== Toponomy ==
According to the Bulletin des recherches historiques (1895), the land-surveyor Noël Beaupré wrote an official report on the river on February 3, 1721, but without naming it, leaving it unclear if its current name was in use in the 18th century.

There are two hypotheses to explain the origin of the river's name. It would be either of indigenous origin or of French origin:

1. The name of the river and the city would come from the Anishinaabemowin (language of the Algonquin Anishinaabeg) Tenagatino Zibi, according to the elders of Kitigan Zibi.
2. In his 1889 article published in the Echo de la Gatineau, Benjamin Sulte wrote: "One hundred years ago, the Gatineau family was extinct, or thereabouts; it is hardly likely that we waited for its disappearance to consecrate the memory of the three or four fur traders it produced. The custom must have been established during the lifetime of these men, and because they traded in these places. Of the latter fact, for instance, I am not certain." In his own words, Sulte writes that he is creating a myth and that the story that the Gatineau family gave the river its name is a myth, invented by Sulte himself. According to Sulte, the name Gatineau comes from the Gastineau family - not Gatineau - one of its members, Nicolas Gastineau sieur Duplessis (1627-1689).

The toponym Lettinoe, Gateno, Gatteno and Gatineau appears:

- The name Lettinoe, in a report by a Lieutenant Jones in 1783;
- The names Gateno, Gatteno, and Gatenoe in several documents and letters written by Philemon Wright, Colonel John By, and by surveyor Theodore Davis (1800 to 1831);
- On the topographical description of the area in 1831 by Canadian surveyor Joseph Bouchette;
- In a letter dated May 22, 1838 from Bishop Lartigue of Montreal to Bishop Patrick Phelan of Kingston;
- On William Henderson's map of 1831;
- On Thomas Devine's map in 1861.

== Geography ==
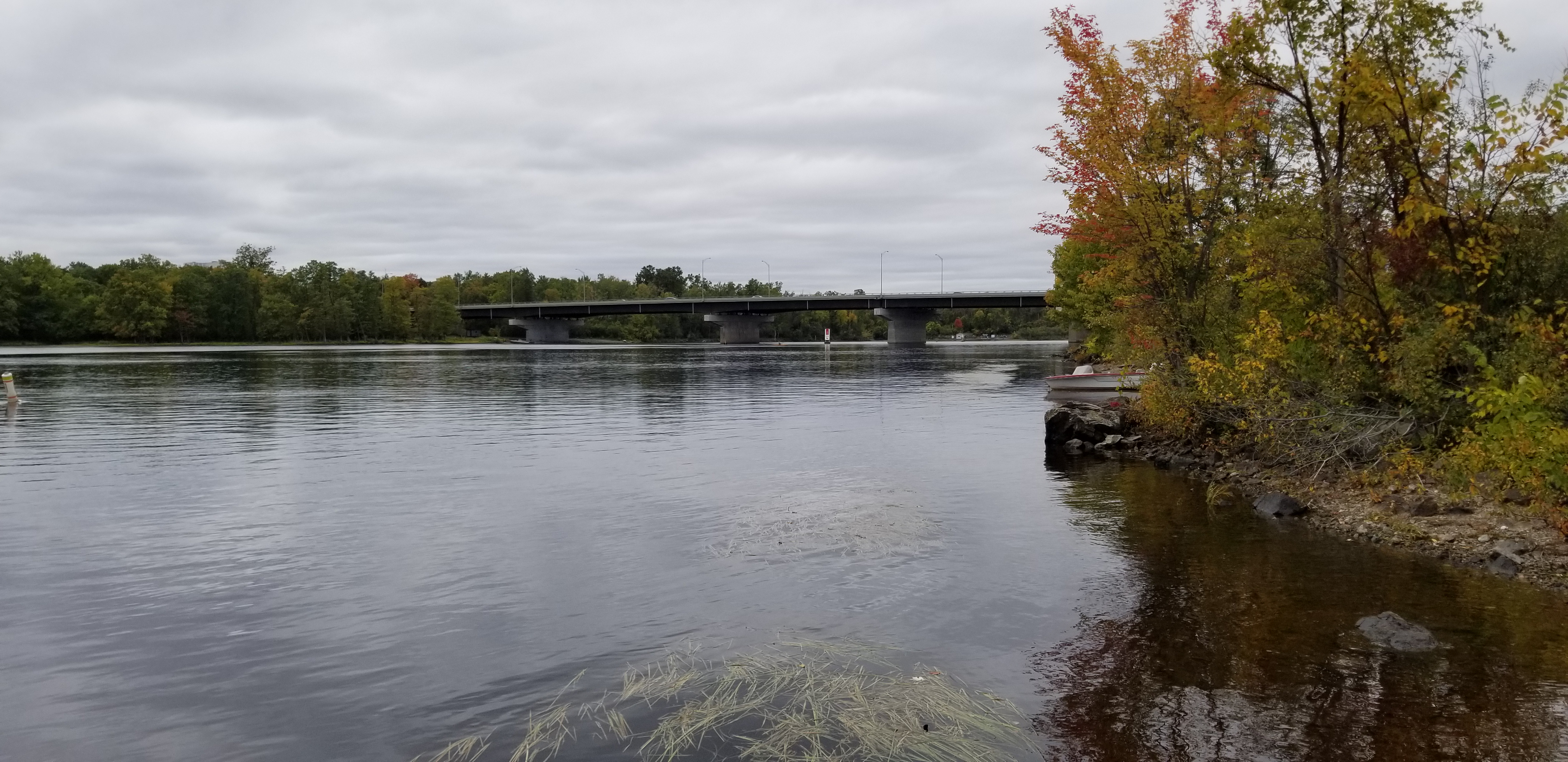
Draveurs Bridge (highway 50-route 148) crossing Gatineau River (view upstream on October 7, 2018, from Jacques-Cartier street).

The geography of the area was altered with the construction of the Baskatong Reservoir, and it is still possible to travel upstream on the Gatineau and reach a point where a small portage leads to the headwaters of the Ottawa River. The Ottawa River then flows northwest and turns south where it eventually flows more easterly and connects with the Gatineau.

The river flows through the communities of:

- Maniwaki
- Gracefield
- Low
- Wakefield
- Chelsea
- Cantley
- Gatineau

A covered wooden bridge over the river at Wakefield, built in 1915, was destroyed by arson in 1984, but has been rebuilt.

=== Tributaries ===
Major tributaries of the Gatineau River in upstream order are:

- La Pêche River
- Kazabazua River
- Picanoc River
- Grand Lac Rond
  - Thirty-one Mile Lake
- Rivière Désert
  - Rivière de l'Aigle (Eagle River)
  - Tomasine River
  - Désert Lake
    - Ignace River
- Baskatong Reservoir
  - Gens de Terre River
    - Wapus River
    - Belinge River
    - Cabonga Reservoir
  - Rivière d'Argent
  - Notawassi River
  - Petawaga River
    - Petawaga Lake
- Bazin River
  - Rivière aux Bleuets
  - Rivière à la Marte (Marten River)
  - Dandurand River
- Rivière du Canot (Canoe River)
- Choquette River
- Chabot River
- Fortier River
- Chouart River
- Tamarac River
- Clova River

== History ==
=== Exploration ===
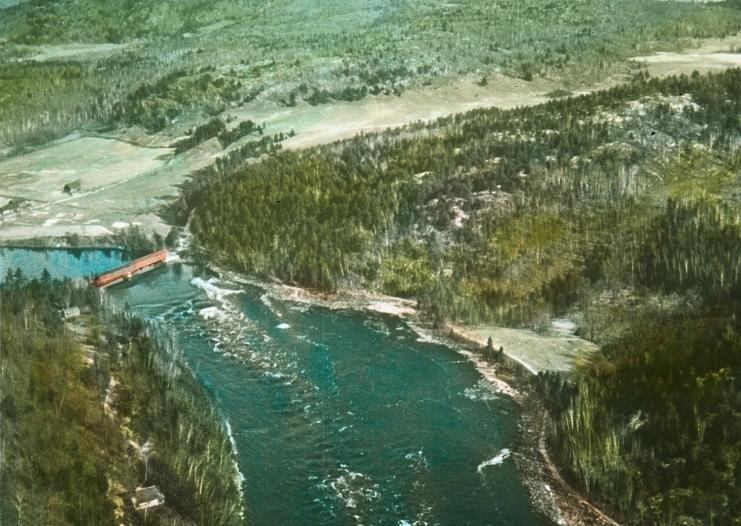
Gatineau River near Farrellton, circa 1930

This river was an important transportation corridor for native people of the region and early explorers. On June 4, 1613, Samuel de Champlain passed here while travelling on the Ottawa River to L'Isle-aux-Allumettes. He noted this "river coming from the north" but did not give its name.

=== Economic uses ===
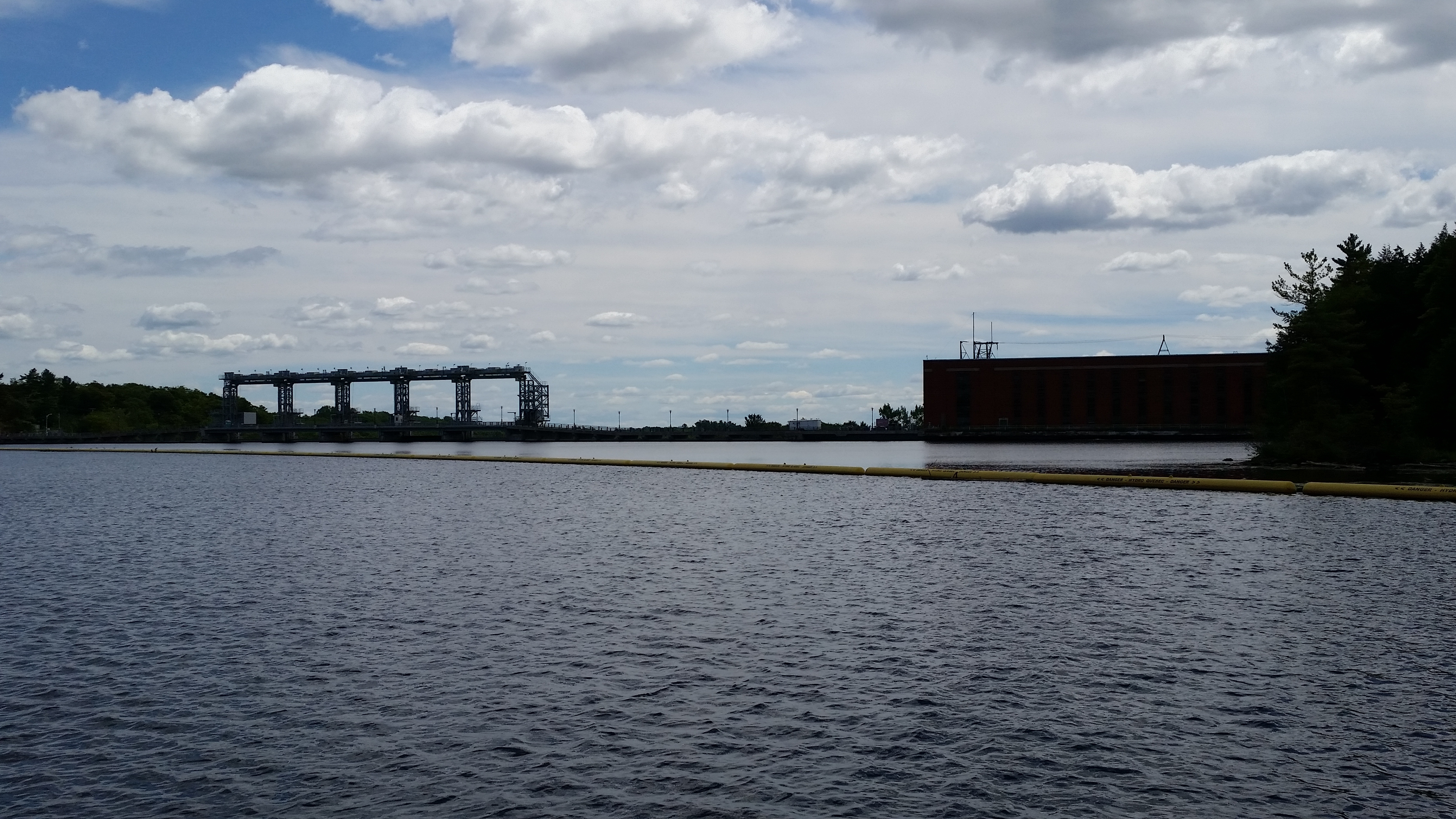
Chelsea Hydroelectric Station and dam

From the 19th century until 1991, the river was used to transport logs to sawmills near the mouth of the river. Philemon Wright and his descendants played an important role in the development of the lumber industry in the Gatineau valley. In more recent times, with declining quality in the forests of the region, logs were used for pulp and paper.

The river has been extensively dammed and is an important source of hydroelectric power. In 1925, three hydroelectric dams were constructed along the lower Gatineau River, making them one of the biggest economic and industrial projects in the region's history. These are now known today as the Paugan, Chelsea and Rapides-Farmers Hydroelectric Stations (Centrale Paugan, Centrale Chelsea and Centrale Rapides-Farmers). The stations are located within the municipalities of Low, Cantley and Gatineau.

The Hull–Chelsea–Wakefield Railway, a tourist steam train, followed a route up the Gatineau valley to Wakefield.

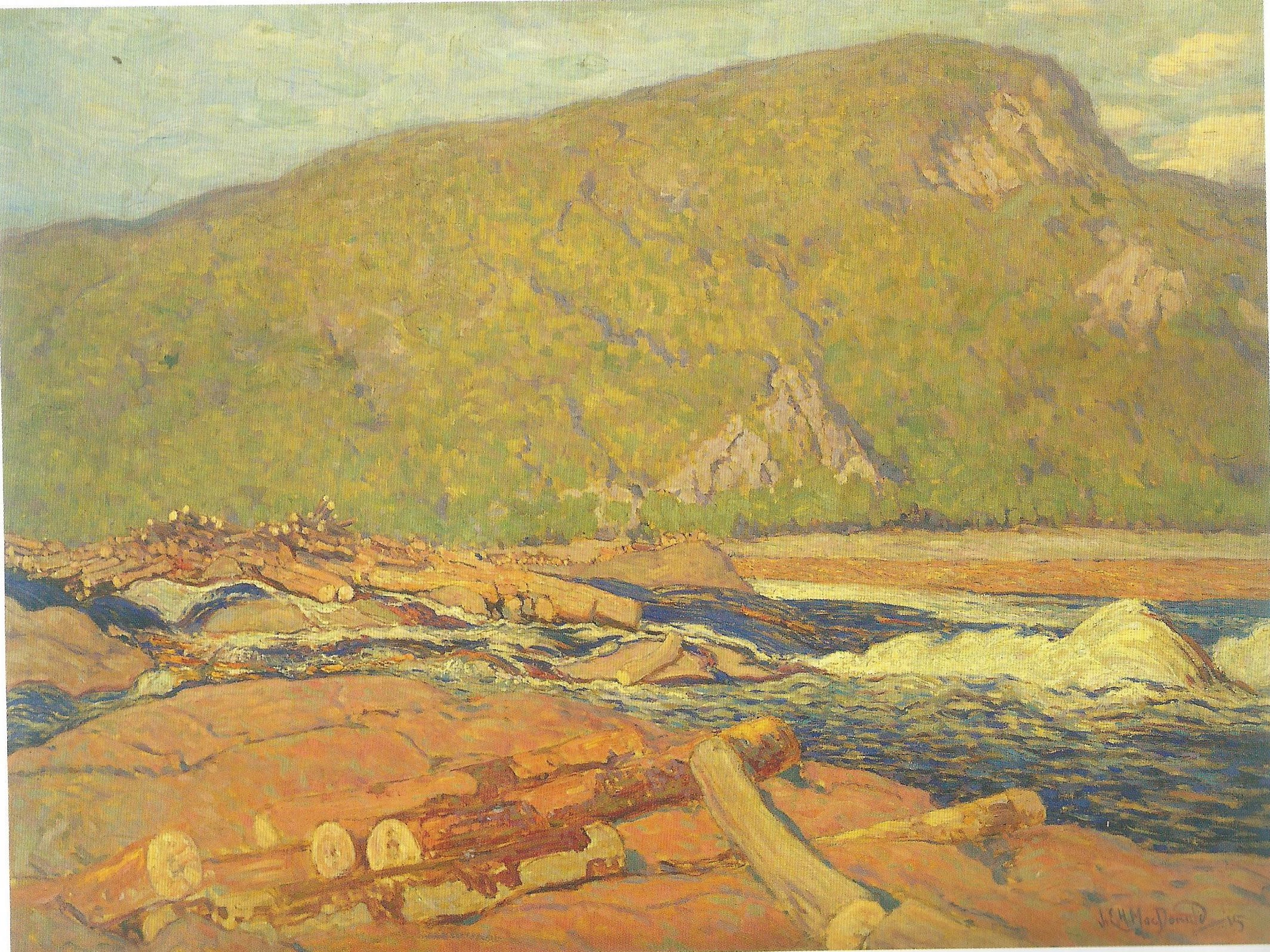
J. E. H. MacDonald, Logs on the Gatineu, 1915. Remai Modern Art Gallery of Saskatchewan, Saskatoon

In 1915, Canadian artist and member of the Group of Seven J. E. H. MacDonald would depict logging operations on the river is his painting, Logs on the Gatineau.

=== Flooding ===
In the spring of 1974, there was extensive flooding along the Gatineau.

== See also ==
- Chemin de fer de l'Outaouais
- List of Quebec rivers
