= Cabonga Reservoir =

Man-made lake in Quebec, Canada

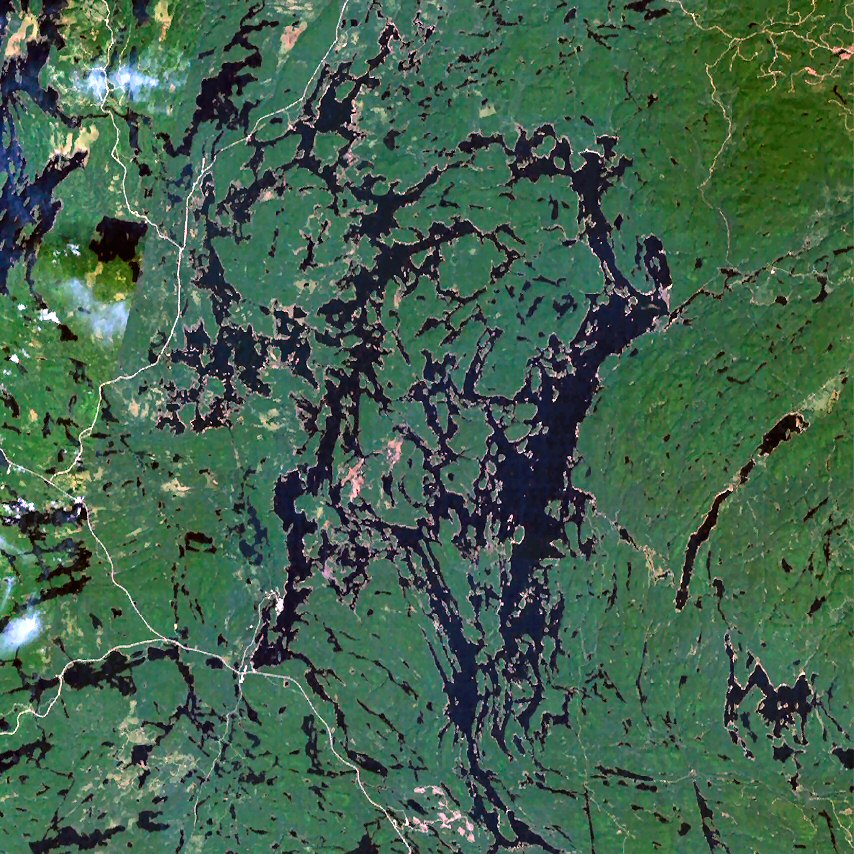

- Location within Quebec
- Location: Lac-Pythonga and Réservoir-Dozois, La Vallée-de-l'Or Regional County Municipality, Quebec
- Coordinates: 47°19′57″N 76°34′37″W
- Type: Artificial
- Primary inflows: Cabonga River
- Primary outflows: Gens de Terre River; Ottawa River
- Basin countries: Canada
- Surface area: 677 km^{2} (261 sq mi)
- Shore length^{1}: 4,500 km (2,800 mi)
- Surface elevation: 361 m (1,184 ft)
- ^{1} Shore length is not a well-defined measure.

The Cabonga Reservoir (French: Réservoir Cabonga) is a man-made lake in central Quebec, Canada, with a total surface area of 677 square kilometres (261 sq mi) and a net area (water only) of 484 square kilometres (187 sq mi). It is located on the boundary between the unorganized territories of Lac-Pythonga and Réservoir-Dozois, and fully within the La Vérendrye Wildlife Reserve. The First Nations reserve of Rapide Lake is on its western shores.

Its name is derived from the Algonquin kakibonga and means "completely blocked by sand."

The reservoir has two outlets: the Gens de Terre River flowing to the south-east which is a tributary of the Baskatong Reservoir and Gatineau River; and an outflow to the north-west flowing directly into Barrière Lake which is part of the Ottawa River system. Both outflows are controlled by dams to regulate the flow on the respective rivers.

Many fishing magazines and websites consider Cabonga Reservoir one of North America's top 20 walleye and northern pike waters. Also, Outdoor Canada magazine includes it among its "simply the best" hot spots for lake trout fishing.

== History ==
Before its impoundment, Lake Cabonga was considered the largest body of water between the Gatineau and Ottawa Rivers. In 1851, the Hudson's Bay Company established a trading post at this lake (named Kakabonga at that time). The post burned down in 1873, and was not rebuilt but replaced by a new post on Barrière Lake. In 1928-1929, a dam at the outlet of the lake, the Gens de Terre River, was constructed to create a water reserve for logging companies to float their logs downstream. Some 37 natural lakes were thus combined and formed a single reservoir with an area of 404 square kilometres (156 sq mi), dotted with innumerable islands (some with considerable proportions) and deep bays.

Surveyor H. C. Symmes, in a report dating from 1864, used "Kakibonga" to designate the lake. In 1911, one map named it "Lake Kakabonga". Finally in 1924, the Commission de Géographie approved its current name.

== Fauna ==
Fish species found in the lake are: lake trout, yellow walleye, northern pike, lake sturgeon, lake whitefish, sauger, white sucker, and yellow perch.

== See also ==
- Zec Capitachouane
- Dozois Reservoir, nearby large reservoir downstream on the Ottawa River
