= Jean-Paul Bordeleau =

Canadian politician (1943–2022)

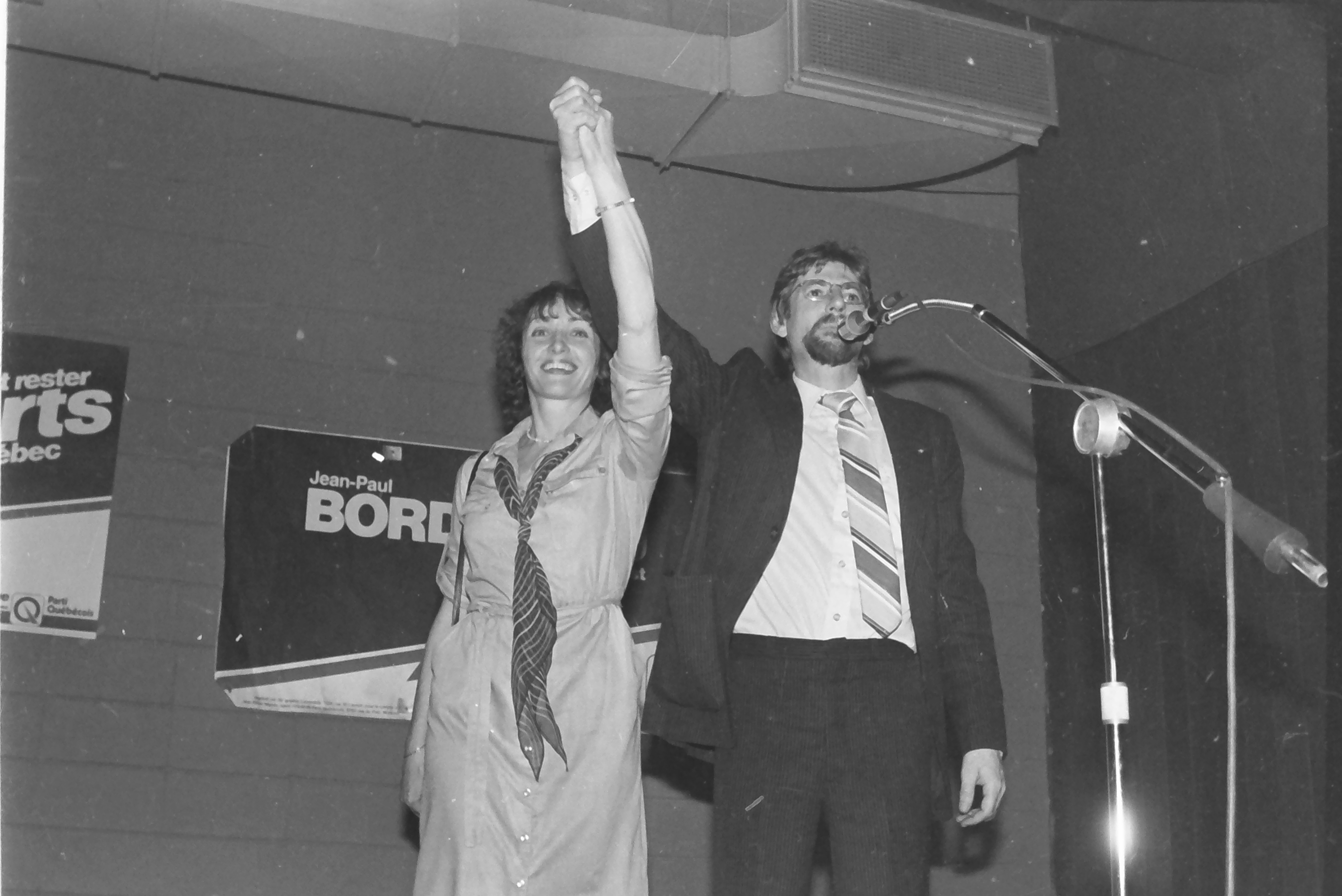
- Jean-Paul Bordeleau with his spouse Suzanne after winning the 1981 election

Member of the National Assembly of Quebec
- In office 1976–1985
- Preceded by: Roger Houde
- Succeeded by: Raymond Savoie
- Constituency: Abitibi-Est

Personal details
- Born: 31 January 1943 Chazel, Quebec, Canada
- Died: 29 January 2022 (aged 78) Abitibi-Témiscamingue, Quebec, Canada
- Party: PQ

Jean-Paul Bordeleau (31 January 1943 – 29 January 2022) was a Canadian politician. He represented the constituency of Abitibi-Est in the National Assembly of Quebec from 1976 to 1985 under the banner of the Parti Québécois.

== Biography ==
Bordeleau began his career as an architect, working from 1966 to 1976. He was elected for the first time in 1976 and re-elected in 1981 alongside Gilles Baril from Rouyn-Noranda–Témiscamingue. During his mandate, he collaborated with Val-d'Or mayor André Pelletier to build a bypass around the city. He was also parliamentary assistant to the Minister of Energy and Resources and the Minister of Manpower and Income Security. He was also vice-president of the council of deputies of the Parti Québécois and Chairman of the Committee on Economics and Labor prior to his defeat in 1985.

In 1985, Bordeleau's parliamentary office was vandalized and multiple files were stolen. During this time, demonstrators had been demanding the reopening of a factory, which had closed its doors the year prior. Workers who had been laid off set up camp outside his office and condemned his absence in the drive to reopen the factory. After his departure from the National Assembly of Quebec, he was political attaché to André Pelletier from 1994 to 1999.

Bordeleau served on the Conseil des aînés from 2001 to 2005. He was also President of the Comité de toponymie de la Ville de Val-d'Or and President of the Association Québec-France pour l'Abitibi-Témiscamingue. In October 2013, he wrote the book Parole de gauchers alongside Léandre Normand. He was a member of the organizing committee of the Prix littéraire jeunesse Télé-Québec. He also sat on the omité de rétablissement du caribou de Val-d'Or.

Jean-Paul Bordeleau died in Abitibi-Témiscamingue on 29 January 2022, two days shy of his 79th birthday.
