= Abitibi-Est =

Provincial electoral district in Quebec, Canada

Coordinates: 48.02°N 77.80°W

Quebec electoral district
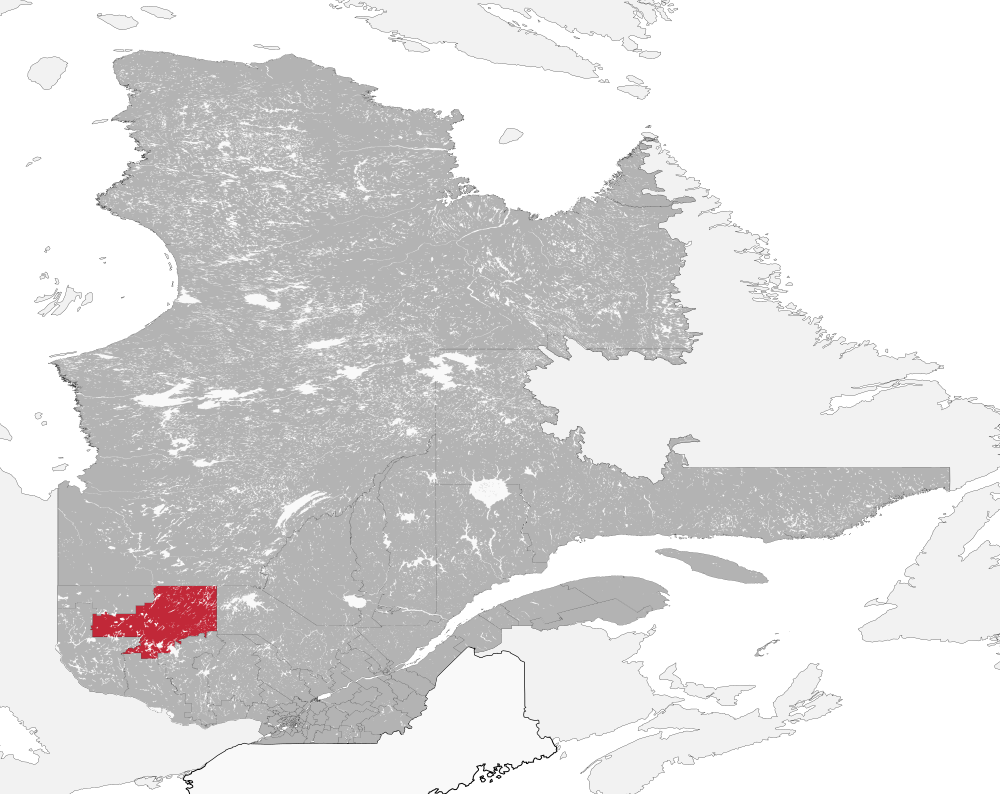

Provincial electoral district
- Legislature: National Assembly of Quebec
MNA
Stéphane Tremblay
Parti Québécois
- District created: 1944
- First contested: 1944
- Last contested: 2026

Demographics
- Electors (2014): 33,638
- Area (km²): 29,201.8
- Census division(s): La Vallée-de-l'Or (all), Rouyn-Noranda (part)
- Census subdivision(s): Rouyn-Noranda (part), Belcourt, Malartic, Rivière-Héva, Senneterre (parish), Senneterre (city), Val-d'Or; Lac-Simon, Kitcisakik; Lac-Granet, Lac-Metei, Matchi-Manitou, Réservoir-Dozois

Abitibi-Est (French pronunciation: [abitibi ɛst]) is a provincial electoral district in the Abitibi-Témiscamingue region of Quebec, Canada, that elects members to the National Assembly of Quebec. The district notably includes eastern portions of the city of Rouyn-Noranda as well as Val-d'Or, Malartic and Senneterre.

The riding was created for the 1944 election from a part of Abitibi.

In the change from the 2001 to the 2011 electoral map, Abitibi-Est lost the municipality of Barraute and its share of the unorganized territory of Lac-Despinassy to Abitibi-Ouest.

== Members of the Legislative Assembly / National Assembly ==
Legislature	Years	Member	Party
Riding created from Abitibi
22nd	1944–1948	Henri Drouin	Liberal
23rd	1948–1952	Jacques Miquelon	Union Nationale
24th	1952–1956	Jacques Miquelon	Union Nationale
25th	1956–1960	Jacques Miquelon	Union Nationale
26th	1960–1962	Lucien Cliche	Liberal
27th	1962–1966	Lucien Cliche	Liberal
28th	1966–1970	Lucien Cliche	Liberal
29th	1970–1973	Ronald Tétrault	Ralliement créditiste
30th	1973–1976	Roger Houde	Liberal
31st	1976–1981	Jean-Paul Bordeleau	Parti Québécois
32nd	1981–1985	Jean-Paul Bordeleau	Parti Québécois
33rd	1985–1989	Raymond Savoie	Liberal
34th	1989–1994	Raymond Savoie	Liberal
35th	1994–1998	André Pelletier	Parti Québécois
36th	1998–2003	André Pelletier	Parti Québécois
37th	2003–2007	Pierre Corbeil	Liberal
38th	2007–2008	Alexis Wawanoloath	Parti Québécois
39th	2008–2012	Pierre Corbeil	Liberal
40th	2012–2014	Élizabeth Larouche	Parti Québécois
41st	2014–2018	Guy Bourgeois	Liberal
42nd	2018–2022	Pierre Dufour	Coalition Avenir Québec
43rd	2022–2025	Pierre Dufour	Coalition Avenir Québec
43rd	2025–2026	Pierre Dufour	Independent
44th	2026–Present	Stéphane Tremblay	Parti Québécois

== Election results ==
2026 Quebec general election
** Preliminary results — Not yet official **
Party	Candidate	Votes	%	±%
Parti Québécois	Stéphane Tremblay	7,192	34.65	+22.26
Conservative	Jean-Philip Girard	4,609	22.20	+10.19
Liberal	Pierre Dufour	4,292	20.68	+5.97
Coalition Avenir Québec	Manon Barbe	2,587	12.46	–34.71
Québec solidaire	Sara Germain	1,956	9.42	–4.29
Climat Québec	Christian Savard	123	0.59	N/A
Total valid votes		20,759	98.01	–0.08
Total rejected, unmarked, and declined ballots		422	1.99	+0.08
Turnout		21,181	63.29	+0.72
Eligible voters		33,465		
Parti Québécois gain from Coalition Avenir Québec		Swing		+6.04
Source: Élections Québec

2022 Quebec general election
Party	Candidate	Votes	%	±%
Coalition Avenir Québec	Pierre Dufour	9,762	47.17	+4.45
Liberal	Jean-Maurice Matte	3,044	14.71	-4.04
Québec solidaire	Benjamin Gingras	2,838	13.71	-1.91
Parti Québécois	Jacline Rouleau	2,565	12.39	-7.09
Conservative	Maxym Perron-Tellier	2,486	12.01	–
Total valid votes		20,695	98.09	–
Total rejected ballots		404	1.91	–
Turnout		21,099	62.57	
Electors on the lists		33,723		

2018 Quebec general election
Party	Candidate	Votes	%	±%
Coalition Avenir Québec	Pierre Dufour	8,967	42.72	+23.68
Parti Québécois	Élizabeth Larouche	4,090	19.48	-11.15
Liberal	Guy Bourgeois	3,936	18.75	-22.34
Québec solidaire	Lyne Cyr	3,287	15.66	+8.54
Green	Mélina Paquette	356	1.7	
Citoyens au pouvoir	Éric Caron	355	1.69	
Total valid votes		20,991	97.44	
Total rejected ballots		551	2.56	
Turnout		21,542	63.79	
Eligible voters		33,770		
Coalition Avenir Québec gain from Liberal		Swing		+17.42
Source(s) "Rapport des résultats officiels du scrutin". Élections Québec.

2014 Quebec general election
Party	Candidate	Votes	%	±%
Liberal	Guy Bourgeois	8,476	41.09	+6.24
Parti Québécois	Élizabeth Larouche	6,317	30.63	-7.78
Coalition Avenir Québec	Sylvain Martel	3,927	19.04	+0.55
Québec solidaire	Valérie Dufour	1,469	7.12	+2.35
Option nationale	Richard Trudel	235	1.14	-0.92
Conservative	Maxym Perron-Tellier	202	0.98	
Total valid votes		20,626	97.52	–
Total rejected ballots		525	2.48	–
Turnout		21,151	62.88	
Electors on the lists		33,638	–	–
Liberal gain from Parti Québécois		Swing		

2012 Quebec general election
Party	Candidate	Votes	%	±%
Parti Québécois	Élizabeth Larouche	8,430	38.39	-4.53
Liberal	Pierre Corbeil	7,653	34.85	-11.18
Coalition Avenir Québec	Samuel Dupras	4,059	18.49	+9,73
Québec solidaire	Sarah Charbonneau-Beaulieu	1,047	4.77	+2.49
Option nationale	Richard Trudel	452	2.06	
Green	Yvette Poucachiche	316	1.44	
Total valid votes		21,957	97.97	–
Total rejected ballots		454	2.03	–
Turnout		22,411	67.38	
Electors on the lists		33,261	–	–
Parti Québécois gain from Liberal		Swing		+3.32

^ Change is from redistributed results. CAQ change is from ADQ.

2008 Quebec general election
Party	Candidate	Votes	%
Liberal	Pierre Corbeil	8,942	45.74
Parti Québécois	Alexis Wawanoloath	8,427	43.11
Action démocratique	Samuel Dupras-Doroftei	1,742	8.91
Québec solidaire	Lizon Boucher	438	2.24

2007 Quebec general election
Party	Candidate	Votes	%
Parti Québécois	Alexis Wawanoloath	8,262	37.71
Liberal	Pierre Corbeil	7,545	34.44
Action démocratique	Gilles Gagnon	5,060	23.10
Québec solidaire	France-Claude Goyette	1,042	4.76

== See also ==
- List of Quebec provincial electoral districts
- Canadian provincial electoral districts
