= Matchi-Manitou =

- Unorganized territory
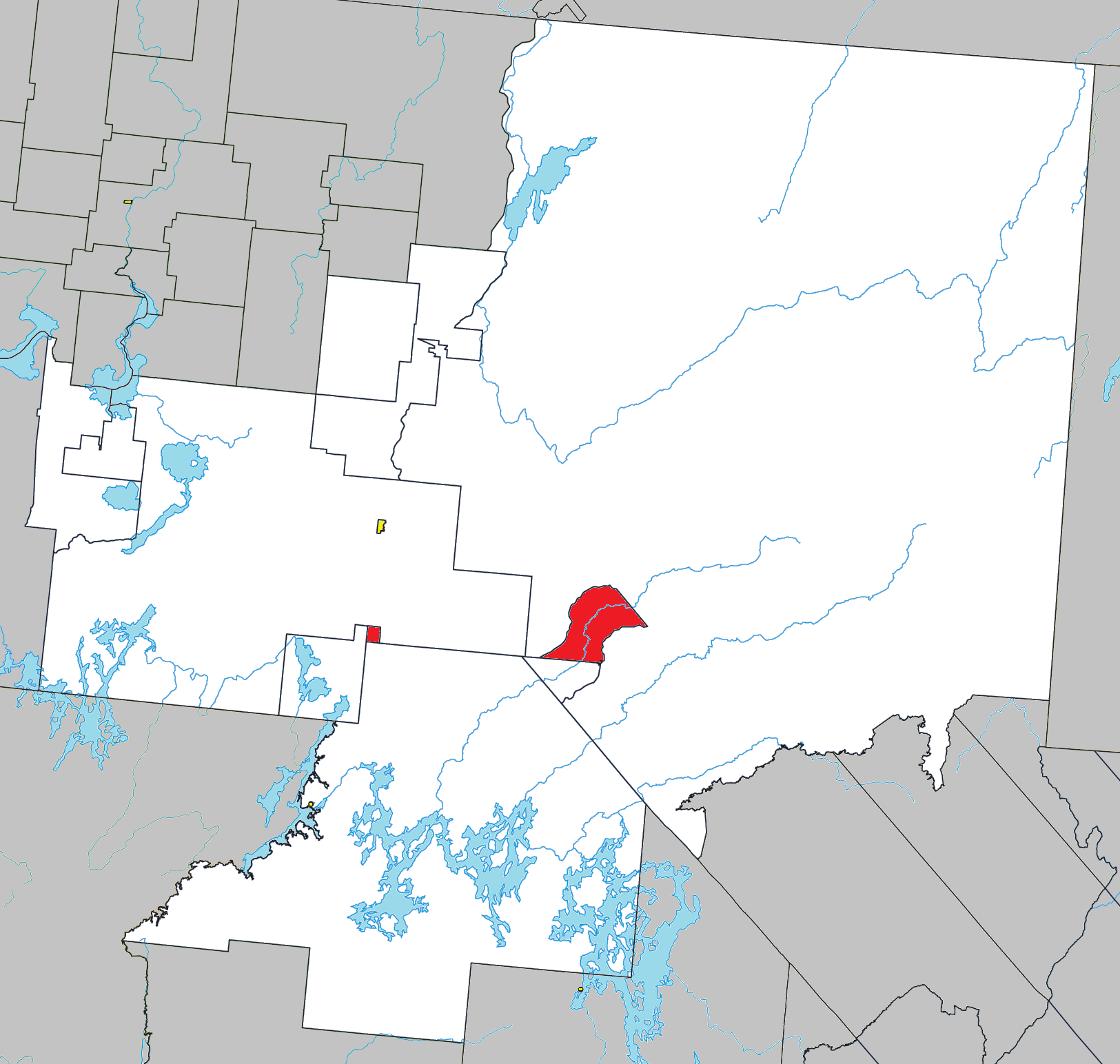
- Location within La Vallée-de-l'Or RCM

- Location in western Quebec
- Coordinates: 48°01′N 77°03′W
- Country: Canada
- Province: Quebec
- Region: Abitibi-Témiscamingue
- RCM: La Vallée-de-l'Or
- Constituted: January 1, 1986

Government
  - Federal riding: Abitibi—Baie-James— Nunavik—Eeyou
  - Prov. riding: Abitibi-Est

Area
  - Total: 164.58 km^{2} (63.54 sq mi)
  - Land: 164.77 km^{2} (63.62 sq mi)
- There is an apparent contradiction between two authoritative sources

Population (2021)
  - Total: 0
  - Density: 0/km^{2} (0/sq mi)
  - Pop (2006-21): 0.0%
  - Dwellings: 0
- Time zone: UTC−05:00 (EST)
  - Summer (DST): UTC−04:00 (EDT)
- Highways: No major routes

Matchi-Manitou is an unorganized territory in the Abitibi-Témiscamingue region of Quebec, Canada. It is one of five unorganized territories in La Vallée-de-l'Or Regional County Municipality.

Until July 6, 1996, Matchi-Manitou was a vast unorganized territory encompassing a land area of 16,760 km^{2} (6,470 sq mi). On that day, most of it was added to the City of Senneterre and a smaller portion to the City of Val-d'Or. It retained only two small non-contiguous areas, of which its eastern part is a section of land straddling both banks of the Chochocouane River and mostly part of the La Vérendrye Wildlife Reserve.

It is named after Matchi-Manitou Lake (48°00′45″N 77°02′56″W), which used to be within its limits, but since 1996 is part of Senneterre and Val-d'Or. Its name is taken from both the Cree and Innu languages and means "evil spirit".

== Demographics ==
Population:

Historical census populations – Matchi-Manitou

Year	Pop.	±%
1986	251	—
1991	240	−4.4%
1996	241	+0.4%
2001	0	−100.0%

Year	Pop.	±%
2006	0	0.00%
2011	0	0.00%
2016	0	0.00%
2021	0	0.00%

Population counts are not adjusted for boundary changes.
Source: Statistics Canada
