= Lac-Granet =

- Unorganized territory
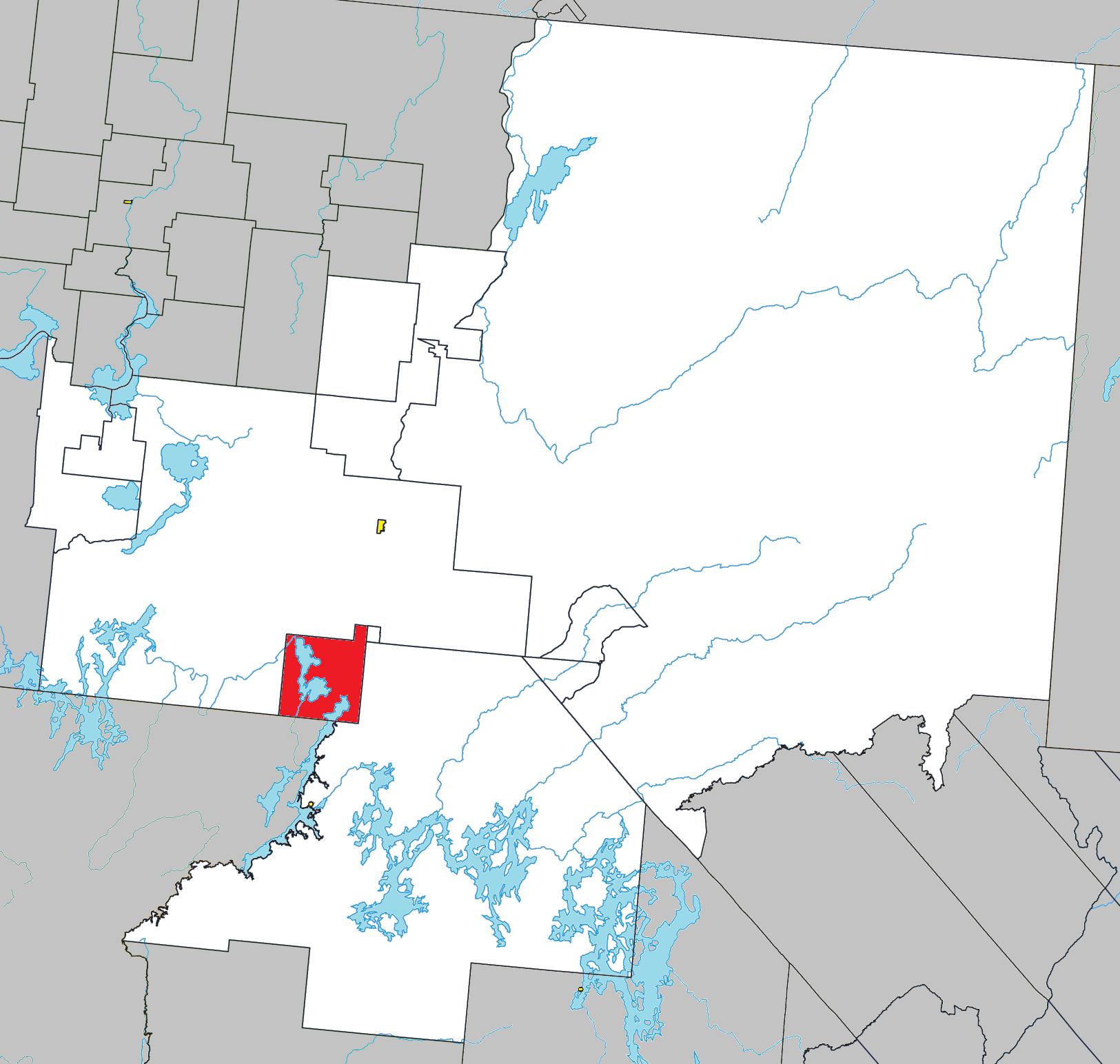
- Location within La Vallée-de-l'Or RCM

- Location in western Quebec
- Coordinates: 47°47′N 77°31′W
- Country: Canada
- Province: Quebec
- Region: Abitibi-Témiscamingue
- RCM: La Vallée-de-l'Or
- Constituted: January 1, 1986

Government
  - Federal riding: Abitibi—Baie-James— Nunavik—Eeyou
  - Prov. riding: Abitibi-Est

Area
  - Total: 273.16 km^{2} (105.47 sq mi)
  - Land: 217.77 km^{2} (84.08 sq mi)

Population (2021)
  - Total: 0
  - Density: 0/km^{2} (0/sq mi)
  - Pop (2016-21): 0.0%
  - Dwellings: 0
- Time zone: UTC−05:00 (EST)
  - Summer (DST): UTC−04:00 (EDT)
- Highways: No major routes

Lac-Granet is an unorganized territory in the Abitibi-Témiscamingue region of Quebec, Canada. It is one of five unorganized territories in the La Vallée-de-l'Or Regional County Municipality.

Until July 6, 1996, Lac-Granet was a large unorganized territory encompassing 1,320.5 km^{2} (509.8 sq mi). On that day, most of it was added to the City of Val-d'Or. It retained only two small non-contiguous areas totalling 303.81 km^{2} (117.30 sq mi), of which its western part was a small section of land straddling the north shore of Lake Lemoine and its eastern part is an almost square tract surrounding Lake Granet, mostly part of the La Vérendrye Wildlife Reserve.

On August 29, 2009, Lac-Granet was reduced in size again when its western portion, together with the Unorganized Territory of Lac-Fouillac, were added to the Municipality of Rivière-Héva. The remaining territory is uninhabited.

== Demographics ==
Historical census populations – Lac-Granet
Year	Pop.	±%
1991	5	—
1996	6	+20.0%
2001	94	+1466.7%
2006	92	−2.1%
2011	0	−100.0%
2016	0	0.00%
2021	0	0.00%
Population counts are not adjusted for boundary changes. Source: Statistics Canada
