= Lac-Pythonga =

- Unorganized territory
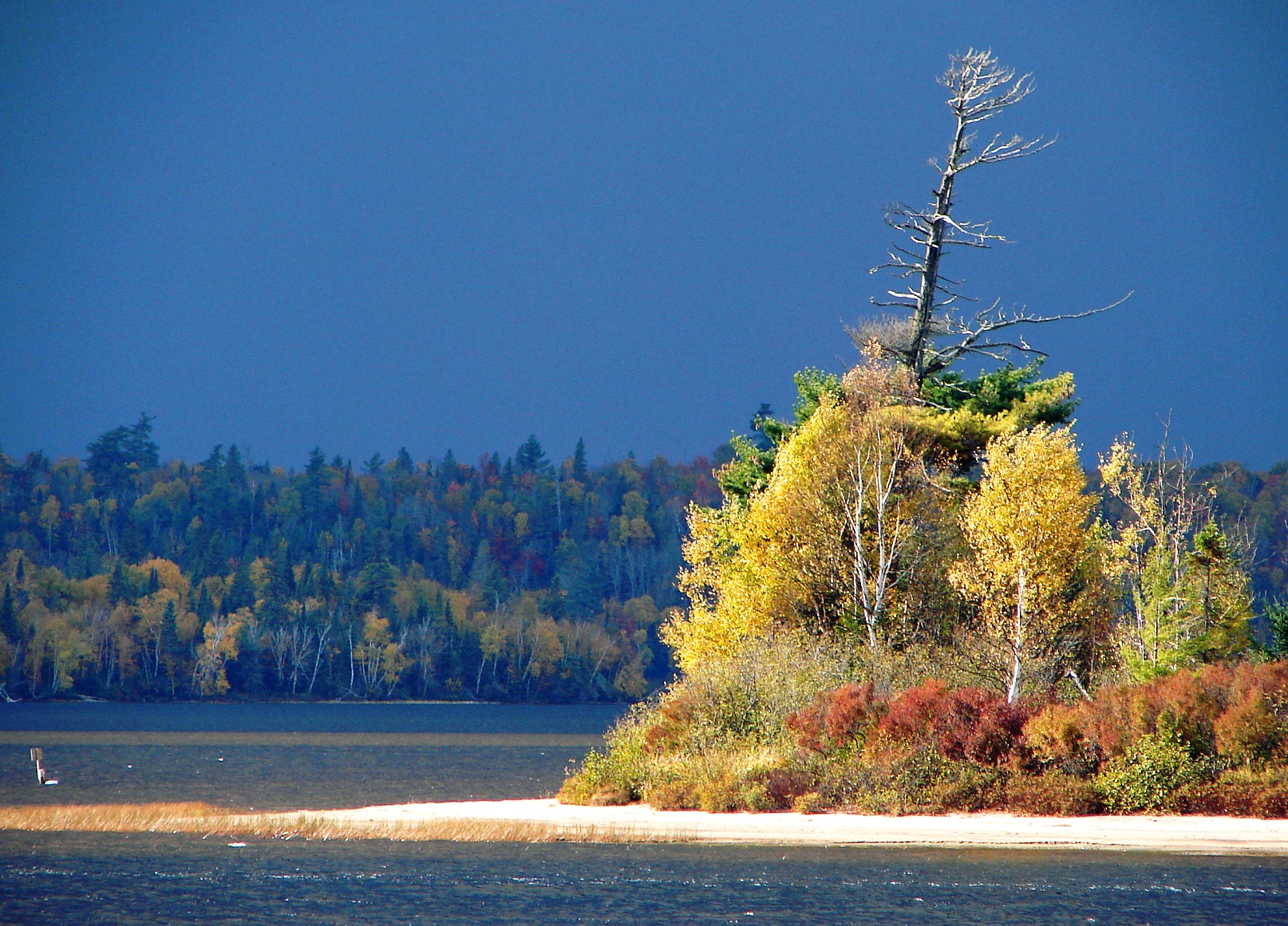
- Jean-Peré Lake in La Vérendrye Wildlife Reserve

- Location in western Quebec
- Coordinates: 46°23′N 76°26′W
- Country: Canada
- Province: Quebec
- Region: Outaouais
- RCM: La Vallée-de-la-Gatineau
- Constituted: January 1, 1986

Government
  - Fed. riding: Pontiac—Kitigan Zibi
  - Prov. riding: Gatineau

Area
  - Total: 5,929.49 km^{2} (2,289.39 sq mi)
  - Land: 5,061.54 km^{2} (1,954.27 sq mi)

Population (2021)
  - Total: 0
  - Density: 0/km^{2} (0/sq mi)
  - Change (2016–21): N/A
  - Dwellings: 0
- Time zone: UTC−05:00 (EST)
  - Summer (DST): UTC−04:00 (EDT)

Lac-Pythonga is an unorganized territory in the Outaouais region of Quebec, Canada. It surrounds Lake Pythonga and is the largest of the five unorganized territories in the La Vallée-de-la-Gatineau Regional County Municipality.

More than half the area of Lac-Pythonga is protected within the La Vérendrye Wildlife Reserve, and most of the remainder is part of Zec Bras-Coupé–Désert and Zec Pontiac. The Rapid Lake First Nation reserve, located on the western shore of Cabonga Reservoir, is an enclave within this territory.

Its name is of Algonquin origin and means "there is a long stretch of sand to approach by paddling".

== Demographics ==
Historical census populations – Lac-Pythonga

Year	Pop.	±%
1981	6	—
1986	5	−16.7%
1991	0	−100.0%
1996	0	0.00%
2001	0	0.00%

Year	Pop.	±%
2006	0	0.00%
2011	0	0.00%
2016	0	0.00%
2021	0	0.00%

Source: Statistics Canada
