= Pierre Dufour (politician) =

Canadian politician

The Honourable Pierre Dufour
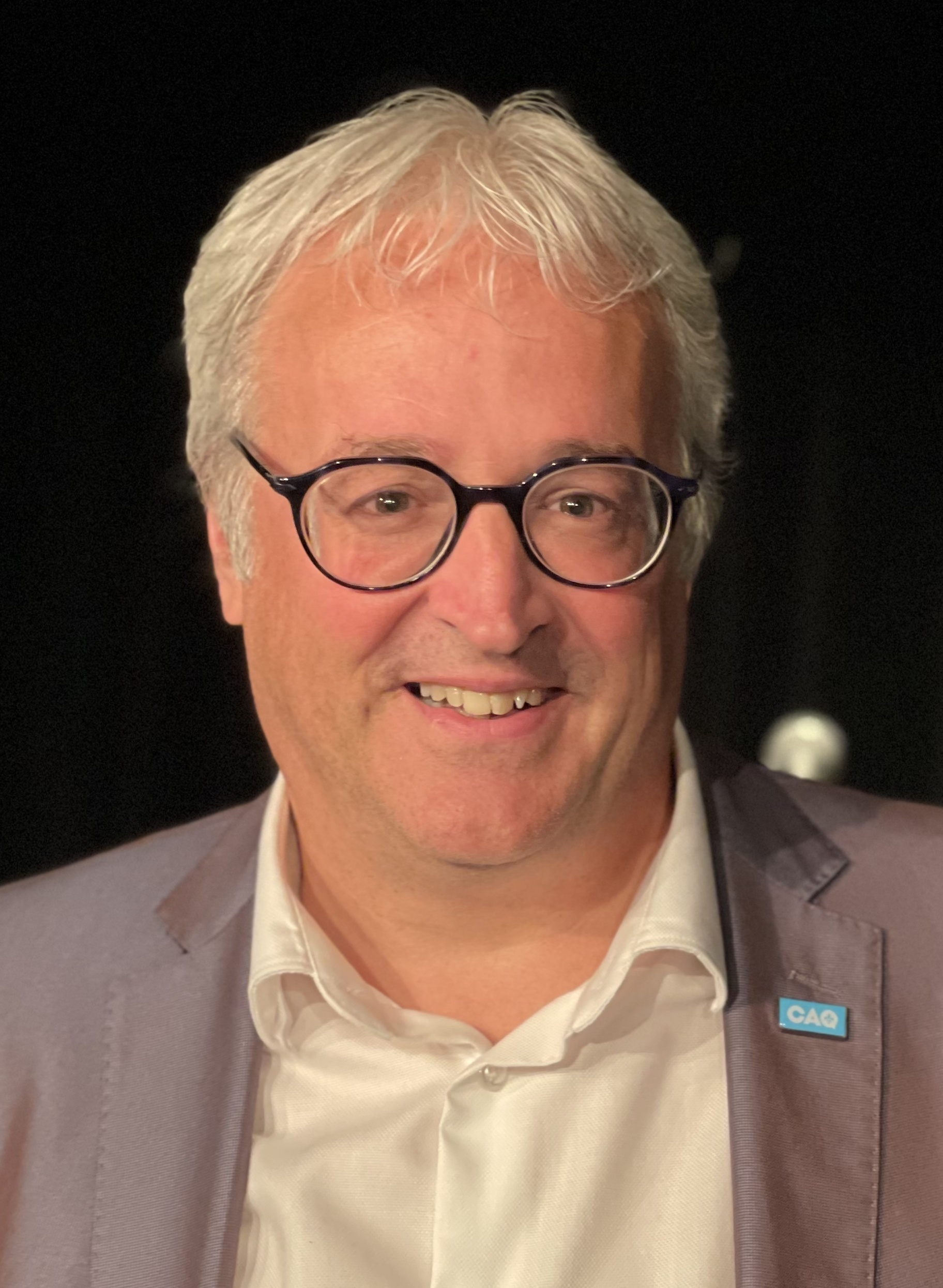

Member of the National Assembly of Quebec for Abitibi-Est
- In office October 1, 2018 – October 5, 2026
- Preceded by: Guy Bourgeois
- Succeeded by: Stéphane Tremblay

Personal details
- Born: 1965 (age 60–61) Thetford Mines, Quebec
- Party: Quebec Liberal Party (provincial, since 2026)
- Other political affiliations: Independent (provincial, 2025-2026) Coalition Avenir Québec (provincial, until 2025) Liberal (federal)

Pierre Dufour is a Canadian politician and businessman, who was elected to the National Assembly of Quebec in the 2018 provincial election. He represented the electoral district of Abitibi-Est as a member of the Coalition Avenir Québec.

He previously ran as a Liberal Party of Canada candidate for the district of Abitibi—Baie-James—Nunavik—Eeyou in the 2015 federal election, but lost to the NDP's Romeo Saganash.

In 2025, he was removed from the CAQ caucus after handing in an ultimatum demanding a ministerial role.

In the 2026 Quebec general election, he stood in Abitibi-Est as a Quebec Liberal Party candidate but was unseated by Stéphane Tremblay from the Parti Québécois (PQ).

== Electoral records ==
2018 Quebec general election: Abitibi-Est
Party	Candidate	Votes	%	±%
Coalition Avenir Québec	Pierre Dufour	8,967	42.72	+23.68
Parti Québécois	Élizabeth Larouche	4,090	19.48	-11.15
Liberal	Guy Bourgeois	3,936	18.75	-22.34
Québec solidaire	Lyne Cyr	3,287	15.66	+8.54
Green	Mélina Paquette	356	1.7	
Citoyens au pouvoir	Éric Caron	355	1.69	
Total valid votes		20,991	97.44	
Total rejected ballots		551	2.56	
Turnout		21,542	63.79	
Eligible voters		33,770		
Coalition Avenir Québec gain from Liberal		Swing		+17.42
Source(s) "Rapport des résultats officiels du scrutin". Élections Québec.

2015 Canadian federal election: Abitibi—Baie-James—Nunavik—Eeyou
Party	Candidate	Votes	%	±%	Expenditures
New Democratic	Roméo Saganash	12,778	37.02	-7.80	$33,061.53
Liberal	Pierre Dufour	11,094	32.14	+21.67	$29,180.64
Bloc Québécois	Luc Ferland	6,398	18.54	+0.27	$31,842.28
Conservative	Steven Hébert	3,211	9.30	-13.25	$11,040.28
Green	Patrick Benoît	779	2.26	-1.63	$2,173.92
Rhinoceros	Mario Gagnon	258	0.75	–	$3.70
Total valid votes/Expense limit		34,518	100.0		$247,914.66
Total rejected ballots		609	–	–	
Turnout		35,127	55.55	–	
Eligible voters		63,226			
New Democratic hold		Swing		-14.73	
Source: Elections Canada

Quebec provincial government of François Legault
Cabinet post (1)
Predecessor	Office	Successor
Luc Blanchette	Minister of Forests, Wildlife and Parks; October 18, 2018 – October 20, 2022	Maïté Blanchette Vézina (Forests) and Benoit Charette (Wildlife and Parks)
