= Lac-Metei =

- Unorganized territory
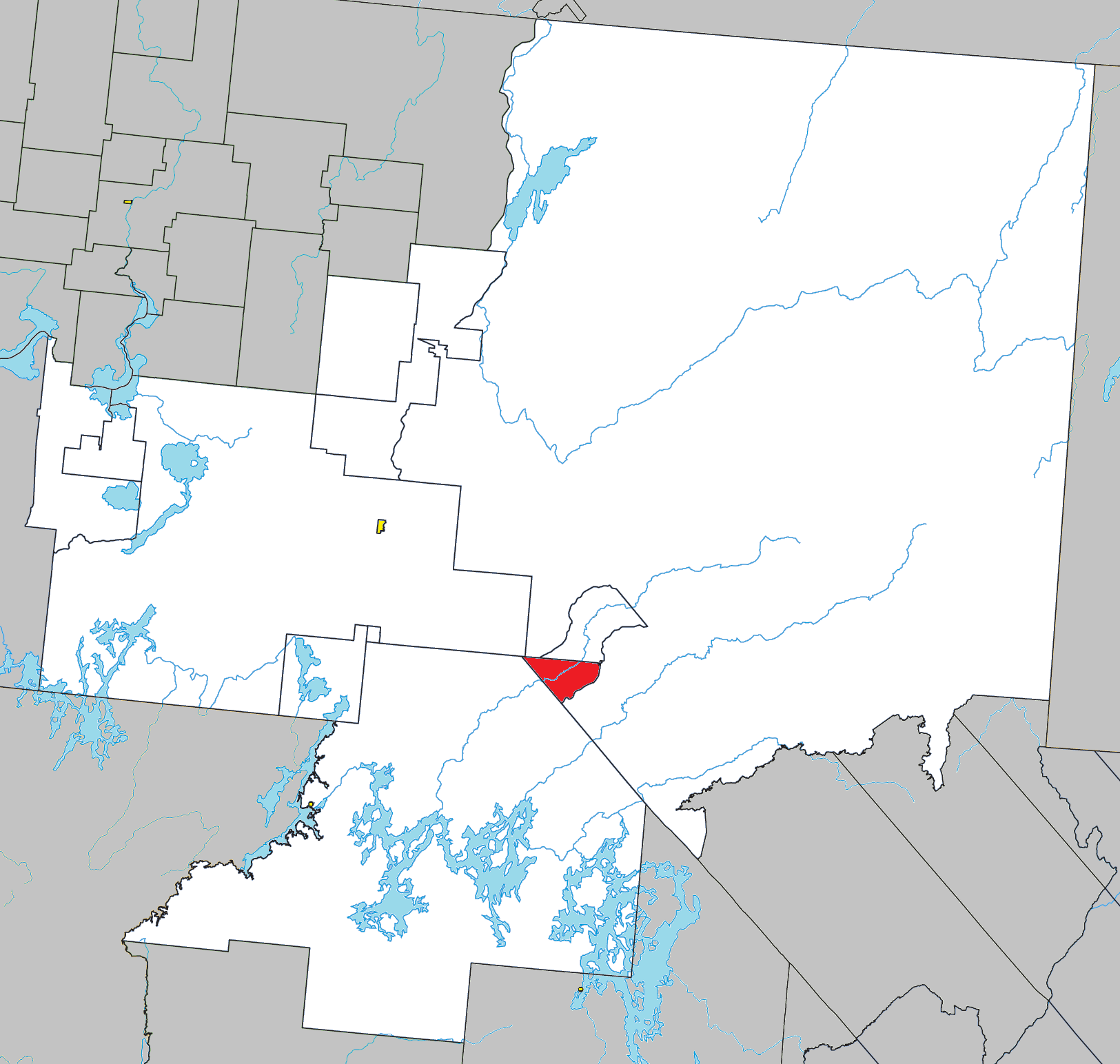
- Location within La Vallée-de-l'Or RCM

- Location in western Quebec
- Coordinates: 47°45′N 76°23′W
- Country: Canada
- Province: Quebec
- Region: Abitibi-Témiscamingue
- RCM: La Vallée-de-l'Or
- Constituted: January 1, 1986

Government
  - Federal riding: Abitibi—Baie-James— Nunavik—Eeyou
  - Prov. riding: Abitibi-Est

Area
  - Total: 78.50 km^{2} (30.31 sq mi)
  - Land: 72.12 km^{2} (27.85 sq mi)

Population (2021)
  - Total: 0
  - Density: 0/km^{2} (0/sq mi)
  - Pop (2016-21): 0.0%
  - Dwellings: 0
- Time zone: UTC−05:00 (EST)
  - Summer (DST): UTC−04:00 (EDT)
- Highways: No major routes

Lac-Metei is an unorganized territory in the Abitibi-Témiscamingue region of Quebec, Canada. It is one of five unorganized territories in the La Vallée-de-l'Or Regional County Municipality. Most of it is inside La Vérendrye Wildlife Reserve.

It was formed on July 6, 1996, when most of the former unorganized territory of Lac-Bricault (which was 1,038.06 km^{2} (400.80 sq mi) in area) was added to the City of Senneterre. It retained only a small wedge-shaped piece of land that was renamed to Lac-Metei, after Lake Metei found within is boundaries. The name Metei comes from the Innu language, meaning "heart".

== Demographics ==
The territory has never had any permanent population since its formation in 1996.
