= Dozois =

Dozois is a surname. Notable people with the surname include:

- Gardner Dozois (1947–2018), American writer and editor
- Marilou Dozois-Prévost (born 1986), Canadian weightlifter
- Paul Dozois (1908–1984), Canadian politician

== See also ==
- Dozois Reservoir, reservoir in Quebec, Canada
