= Lac-Fouillac =

- Interactive map of Lac-Fouillac
- Coordinates: 48°02′N 78°18′W
- Country: Canada
- Province: Quebec
- Region: Abitibi-Témiscamingue
- Regional county: La Vallée-de-l'Or
- Formed: January 1, 1986
- Dissolved: August 29, 2009

Government
  - Type: Unorganized territory

Area
  - Total: 263.00 km^{2} (101.54 sq mi)
  - Land: 240.70 km^{2} (92.93 sq mi)

Population (2006)
  - Total: 91
  - Density: 0.4/km^{2} (1.0/sq mi)
- Time zone: UTC−05:00 (EST)
  - Summer (DST): UTC−04:00 (EDT)

Lac-Fouillac (French pronunciation: [lak fujak]) is a former unorganized territory in the Abitibi-Témiscamingue region of Quebec, Canada, now part the Municipality of Rivière-Héva in the La Vallée-de-l'Or Regional County Municipality.

In July 2007, the residents of Lac-Fouillac overwhelmingly rejected the amalgamation of their territory with the City of Malartic. 96% of voters voted against annexation in a referendum. But two years later on August 29, 2009, Lac-Fouillac, together with the western portion of the Unorganized Territory of Lac-Granet, was merged into the Municipality of Rivière-Héva.

== Demographics ==
Population:

- Population in 2006: 91
- Population in 2001: 77
- Population in 1996: 174
- Population in 1991: 168
