= Réservoir-Dozois =

- Unorganized territory
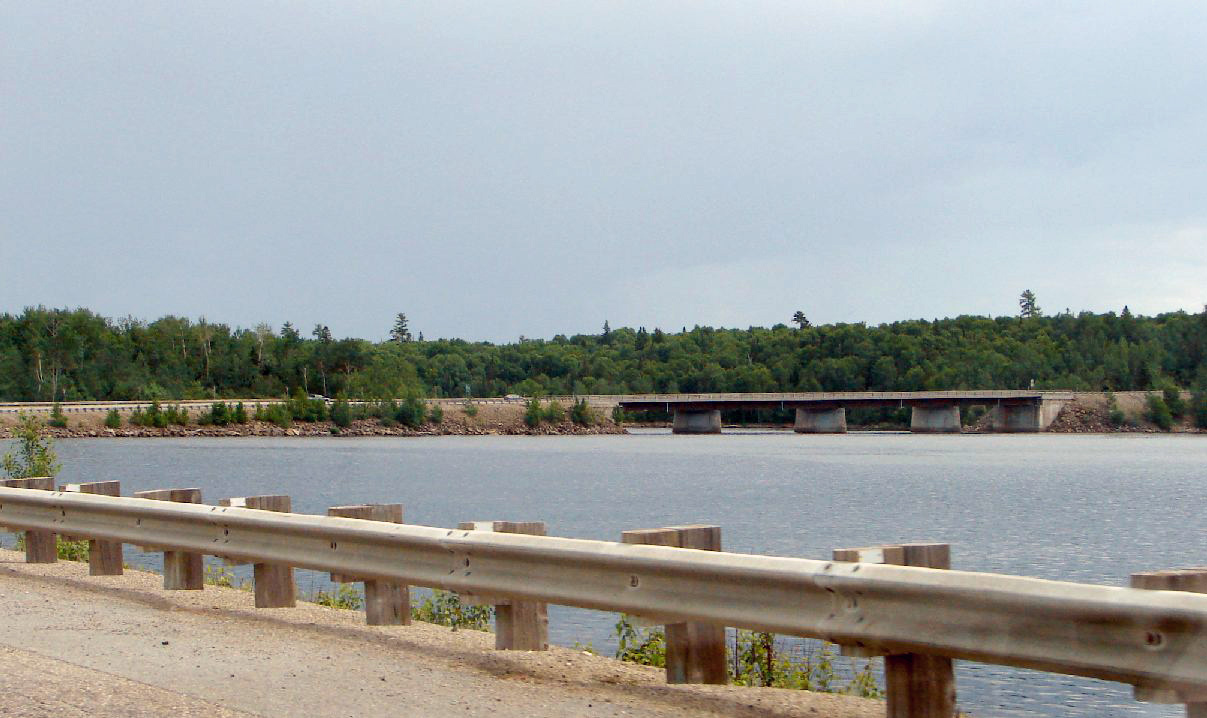
- Dozois Reservoir and Quebec Route 117

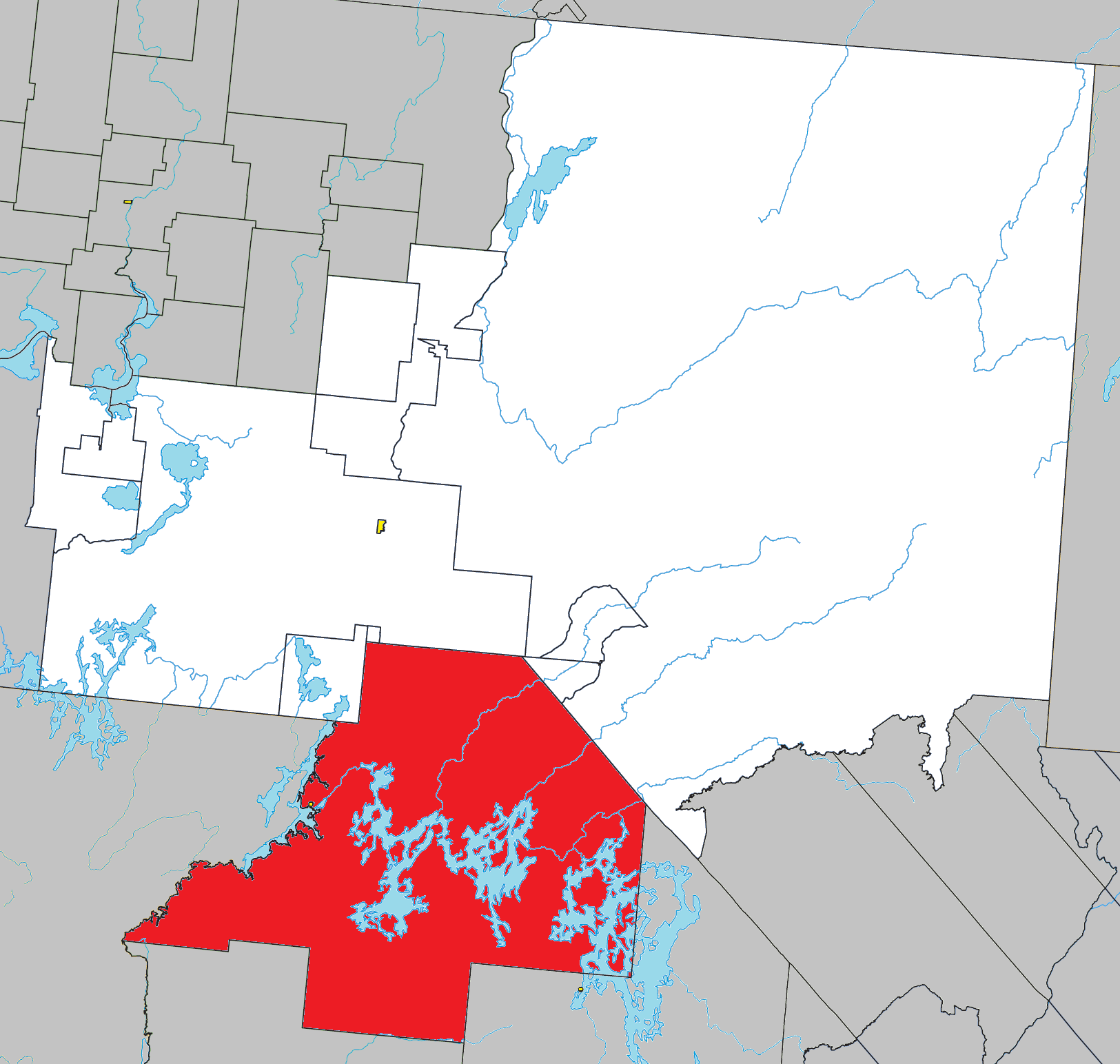
- Location within La Vallée-de-l'Or RCM

- Location in western Quebec
- Coordinates: 47°30′N 77°05′W
- Country: Canada
- Province: Quebec
- Region: Abitibi-Témiscamingue
- RCM: La Vallée-de-l'Or
- Constituted: January 1, 1986

Government
  - Federal riding: Abitibi—Baie-James— Nunavik—Eeyou
  - Prov. riding: Abitibi-Est

Area
  - Total: 4,691.20 km^{2} (1,811.28 sq mi)
  - Land: 3,832.68 km^{2} (1,479.81 sq mi)

Population (2021)
  - Total: 0
  - Density: 0/km^{2} (0/sq mi)
  - Pop (2016-21): 0.0%
  - Dwellings: 3
- Time zone: UTC−5 (EST)
  - Summer (DST): UTC−4 (EDT)
- Highways: R-117 (TCH)

Réservoir-Dozois (French pronunciation: [ʁezɛʁvwaʁ dozwa]) is an unorganized territory in the Abitibi-Témiscamingue region of Quebec, Canada. It is the largest of five unorganized territories in the La Vallée-de-l'Or Regional County Municipality and entirely part of the La Vérendrye Wildlife Reserve.

It is named after the Dozois Reservoir, a large reservoir which formed after the construction of the Bourque Dam on the Ottawa River in 1949. In turn, the name Dozois comes from Nazaire-Servule Dozois (1859-1932), a missionary in the Témiscamingue area and assistant general of the Oblates from 1904 to 1932.

== Demographics ==
The territory has had no inhabitants in any census since 1986, except in 1991, when it had a population of 115.
