= Dozois Reservoir =

Reservoir lake in Quebec, Canada

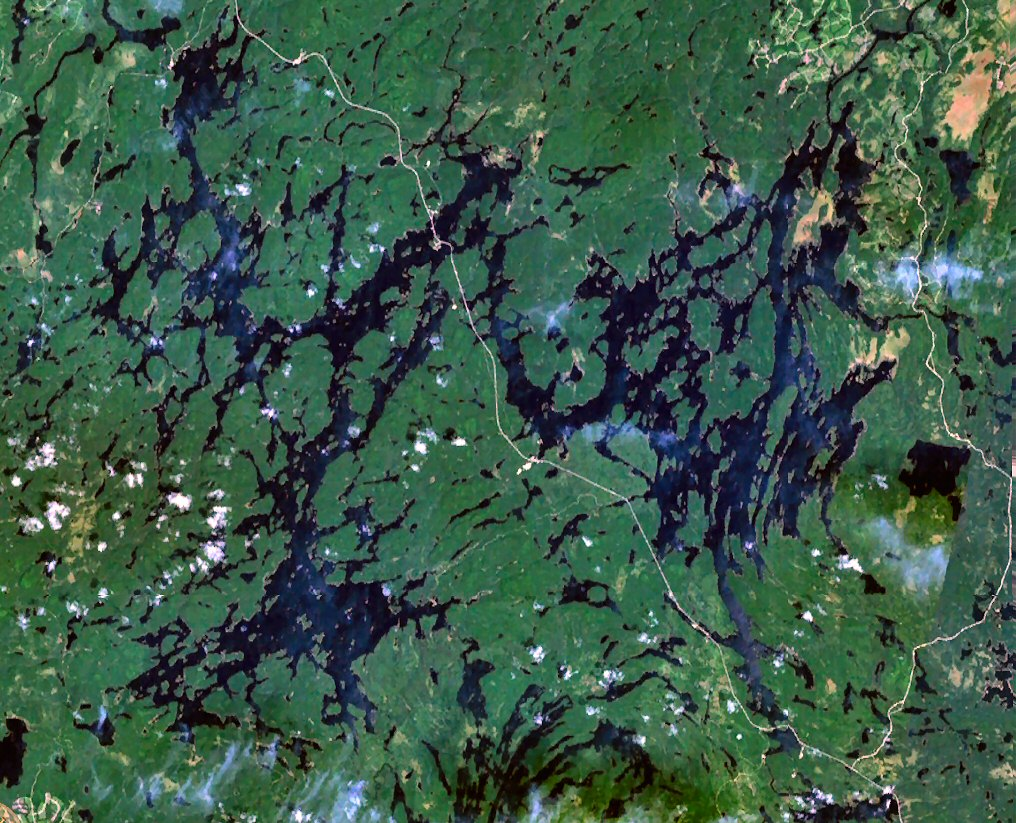

- Location within Quebec
- Location: Réservoir-Dozois, La Vallée-de-l'Or Regional County Municipality, Quebec
- Coordinates: 47°30′00″N 77°05′00″W
- Type: Artificial
- Primary inflows: Ottawa River
- Primary outflows: Ottawa River
- Basin countries: Canada
- Max. length: 61 km (38 mi)
- Max. width: 34 km (21 mi)
- Surface area: 319 km^{2} (123 sq mi)
- Surface elevation: 336.80 m (1,105.0 ft) to 345.95 m (1,135.0 ft)

The Dozois Reservoir (French: Réservoir Dozois) is a man-made lake in central Quebec, Canada. It is fully within the unorganized territory of Réservoir-Dozois and the La Vérendrye Wildlife Reserve.

Dozois Reservoir, located about 10 kilometers west of Cabonga Reservoir and about 15 km east of Great Victoria Lake, is fed by the Chochocouane, Capitachouane, and Ottawa Rivers. It is accessible directly off Quebec Route 117.

== History ==
In 1949, construction of the Bourque Dam began on the Ottawa River, forming Dozois Reservoir. The rising waters flooded numerous smaller lakes, including Lake Soulier, Déléage Bay, and Lake Dozois. The reservoir took its name from Lake Dozois, which in turn was named after Nazaire-Servule Dozois (1859-1932), missionary in Témiscamingue and Assistant General of the Oblates from 1904 to 1932. The name Lake Dozois has been in use since circa 1913, when it replaced "Birch Lake" which appeared on the map of Quebec in 1911.

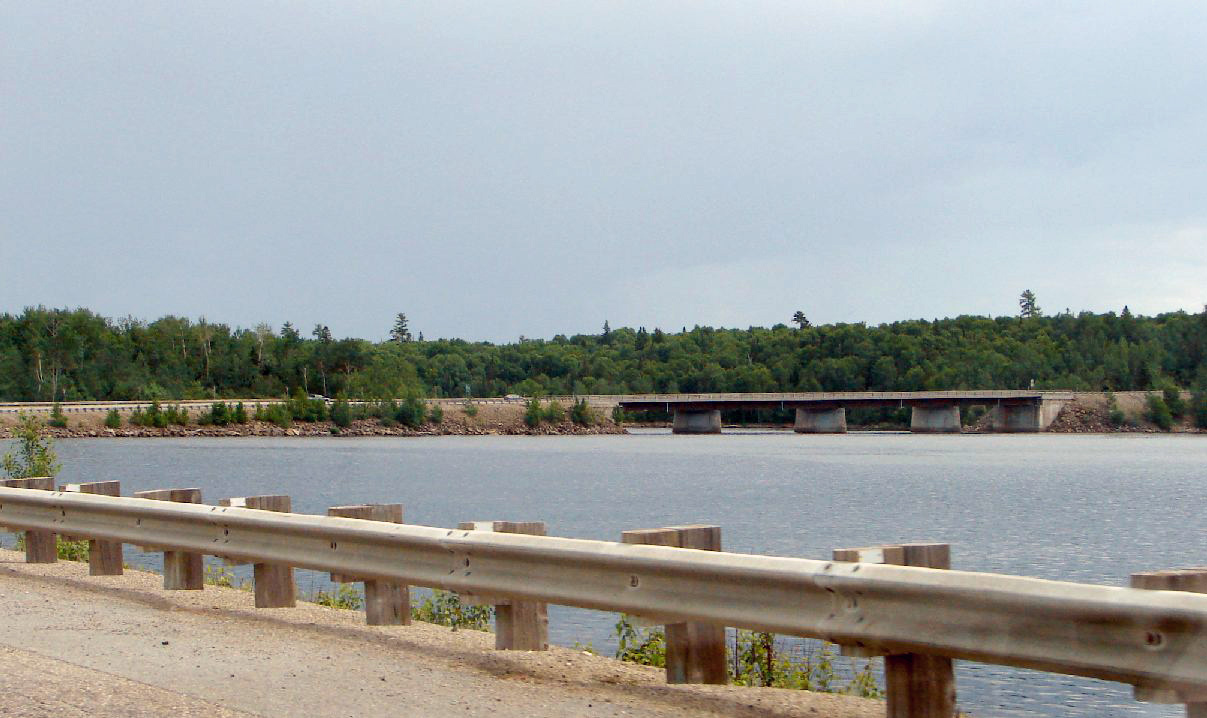
Reservoir Dozois at Quebec Route 117.
