= Lucien Cliche =

Canadian politician (1916–2005)

Member of the Legislative Assembly of Quebec for Abitibi-Est
- In office 1960–1970
- Preceded by: Jacques Miquelon
- Succeeded by: Ronald Tétrault

President of the Legislative Assembly of Quebec
- In office September 20, 1960 – December 20, 1961
- Preceded by: Maurice Tellier
- Succeeded by: John Richard Hyde

Personal details
- Born: August 4, 1916 Vallée-Jonction, Quebec
- Died: June 2, 2005 (aged 88) Val-d'Or, Quebec
- Party: Liberal

Lucien Cliche (French pronunciation: [lysjɛ̃ kliʃ]; August 4, 1916 – June 2, 2005) was a lawyer and political figure in Quebec. He represented Abitibi-Est in the Legislative Assembly of Quebec and then the Quebec National Assembly from 1960 to 1970 as a Liberal. Cliche was Speaker of the Legislative Assembly from 1960 to 1961.

He was born in Vallée-Jonction, Quebec, the son of Vital Cliche and Anne-Marie Cloutier. Cliche was educated at the Séminaire de Québec and the Université Laval. He was called to the Quebec bar in 1940 and set up practice first in Vallée-Jonction and then in Val-d'Or. In 1960, he was named Queen's Counsel. Cliche was bâtonnier for the Abitibi-Témiscamingue bar. He also was recorder and then attorney for the town of Val D'Or, as well as serving on the municipal council for Val-d'Or. In 1954, with Alcide Courcy and Jean-Pierre Bonneville, he founded Le Progrès de Rouyn-Noranda. He served as president of the Chamber of Commerce for Val-d'Or-Bourlamaque.

He served in the Quebec cabinet as Minister of Municipal Affairs from 1961 to 1962 and Minister of Lands and Forests from 1962 to 1966.

Cliche was married twice: to Clara Morrison in 1943 and to Rose Lannan in 1971. He died in Val-d'Or at the age of 88. His wife died in 2007 aged 88.
