= Guy Bourgeois =

Canadian politician

Member of the National Assembly of Quebec for Abitibi-Est
- In office April 7, 2014 – October 1, 2018
- Preceded by: Élizabeth Larouche
- Succeeded by: Pierre Dufour

Personal details
- Born: February 26, 1958 (age 68) Amos, Quebec, Canada
- Party: Quebec Liberal Party

Guy Bourgeois (born February 26, 1958) is a Canadian politician. Bourgeois was elected to the National Assembly of Quebec in the 2014 election. He represented the electoral district of Abitibi-Est as a member of the Quebec Liberal Party.

== Electoral record ==
2022 Quebec general election: Abitibi-Ouest
Party	Candidate	Votes	%	±%
Coalition Avenir Québec	Suzanne Blais	10,399	46.75	+12.63
Parti Québécois	Samuel Doré	4,619	20.76	-12.50
Québec solidaire	Alexis Lapierre	3,623	16.29	-0.30
Conservative	François Vigneault	2,293	10.31	+9.21
Liberal	Guy Bourgeois	1,153	5.18	-6.13
Union Nationale	Jonathan Blanchette	159	0.71	–
Total valid votes		22,246	98.59	–
Total rejected ballots		319	1.41	–
Turnout		22,565	63.70	
Electors on the lists		35,424		

2018 Quebec general election: Abitibi-Est
Party	Candidate	Votes	%	±%
Coalition Avenir Québec	Pierre Dufour	8,967	42.72	+23.68
Parti Québécois	Élizabeth Larouche	4,090	19.48	-11.15
Liberal	Guy Bourgeois	3,936	18.75	-22.34
Québec solidaire	Lyne Cyr	3,287	15.66	+8.54
Green	Mélina Paquette	356	1.7	
Citoyens au pouvoir	Éric Caron	355	1.69	
Total valid votes		20,991	97.44	
Total rejected ballots		551	2.56	
Turnout		21,542	63.79	
Eligible voters		33,770		
Coalition Avenir Québec gain from Liberal		Swing		+17.42
Source(s) "Rapport des résultats officiels du scrutin". Élections Québec.

2014 Quebec general election
Party	Candidate	Votes	%	±%
Liberal	Guy Bourgeois	8,476	41.09	+6.24
Parti Québécois	Élizabeth Larouche	6,317	30.63	-7.78
Coalition Avenir Québec	Sylvain Martel	3,927	19.04	+0.55
Québec solidaire	Valérie Dufour	1,469	7.12	+2.35
Option nationale	Richard Trudel	235	1.14	-0.92
Conservative	Maxym Perron-Tellier	202	0.98	
Total valid votes		20,626	97.52	–
Total rejected ballots		525	2.48	–
Turnout		21,151	62.88	
Electors on the lists		33,638	–	–
Liberal gain from Parti Québécois		Swing		
