= Gens de Terre River =

Gens de Terre River Rivière Gens de Terre
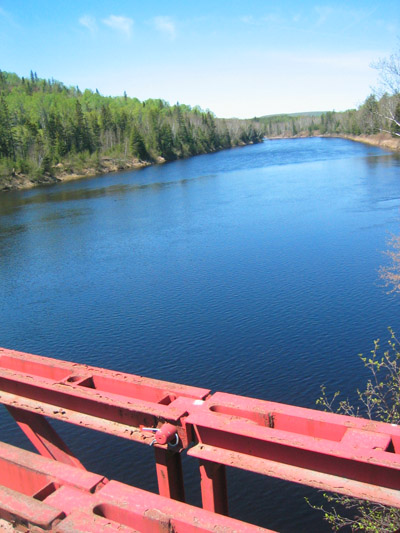

Location
- Country: Canada
- State: Quebec
- Region: Outaouais

Physical characteristics
- Source: Cabonga Reservoir
  - coordinates: 47°18′34″N 76°28′6″W
  - elevation: 355 m (1,165 ft)
- Mouth: Baskatong Reservoir
  - coordinates: 46°52′6″N 75°57′18″W
  - elevation: 235 m (771 ft)
- Length: 115 km (71 mi)

The Gens de Terre River (in French: Rivière Gens de Terre, literal meaning: "people of the land") is a river in central Quebec, Canada. It is located on the eastern edge of the La Vérendrye Wildlife Reserve in the La Vallée-de-la-Gatineau Regional County Municipality in the Outaouais region. Its source is the Cabonga Reservoir from where it flows in a mostly southern direction for 115 km and drains into the Gens de Terre Bay of the Baskatong Reservoir.

Tributaries include:

- Bélinge River
- Wapus River
- Serpent River

The section of the river between the Wapus River and the iron bridge downstream runs through a gorge with 25 meters (82 ft) cliffs on both sides. This 25 kilometers (16 mi) section is marked by continuous class II-IV whitewater, and should only be paddled by expert canoers. The flow of the river depends greatly on the water level management in the Cabonga Reservoir.

== History ==
The name of the river may be attributed to Louis Antoine de Bougainville (1729-1811), aide-de-camp to Marquis de Montcalm. In 1757, he wrote in his journal: "Têtes-de-Boule brought by the Nipissings. Those savages are also called people of the land (gens des terres), live in the woods, are great hunters, mediocre warriors, neither have police nor politics, trade more with the English at the Hudson Bay than with us". And in a memo from 1759, Bougainville wrote: "The nations that deal there are the Têtes-de-Boules (Atikamekw) or people of the land and the Namcosakio who come from towards the Hudson Bay."

The name "Gens de Terre" was probably assigned by voyageurs or fur traders as a reminder of this native American nomadic tribe, whose territory stretched between the upper basins of the Saint-Maurice, Gatineau, and Ottawa Rivers. It has been used in official documents since at least 1867.

In the early twentieth century, the river was called Bark River by the English.

The river was used for a long time by loggers for log driving. The log drivers were nicknamed La Maline (the malignant) because of the obstacles and difficulties that were found along the route.
