= Roger Houde =

Canadian politician (born 1938)

Member of the National Assembly of Quebec for Abitibi-Est
- In office 1973–1976
- Preceded by: Ronald Tétrault
- Succeeded by: Jean-Paul Bordeleau

Personal details
- Born: April 22, 1938 (age 87) Val-d'Or, Quebec
- Party: Liberal

Roger Houde (born April 22, 1938) is a former Canadian politician.

Born in Val-d'Or, Quebec, Houde studied at Université Laval before obtaining a Master of Industrial Relations in 1968. He first ran for the National Assembly of Quebec in the riding of Abitibi-Est in 1970 as the Liberal candidate losing to Ronald Tétrault. From 1970 to 1973, he was the Chief of Staff to Minister of Lands and Forests. He was elected in 1973. From 1973 to 1975, he was the Parliamentary Assistant to Minister of Lands and Forests. From 1975 to 1976, he was the Parliamentary Assistant to the Minister of Agriculture. He did not run in 1976.

In 2001, he was appointed to the Immigration and Refugee Board of Canada.
