= Pierre Corbeil =

Canadian politician and dentist (born 1955)

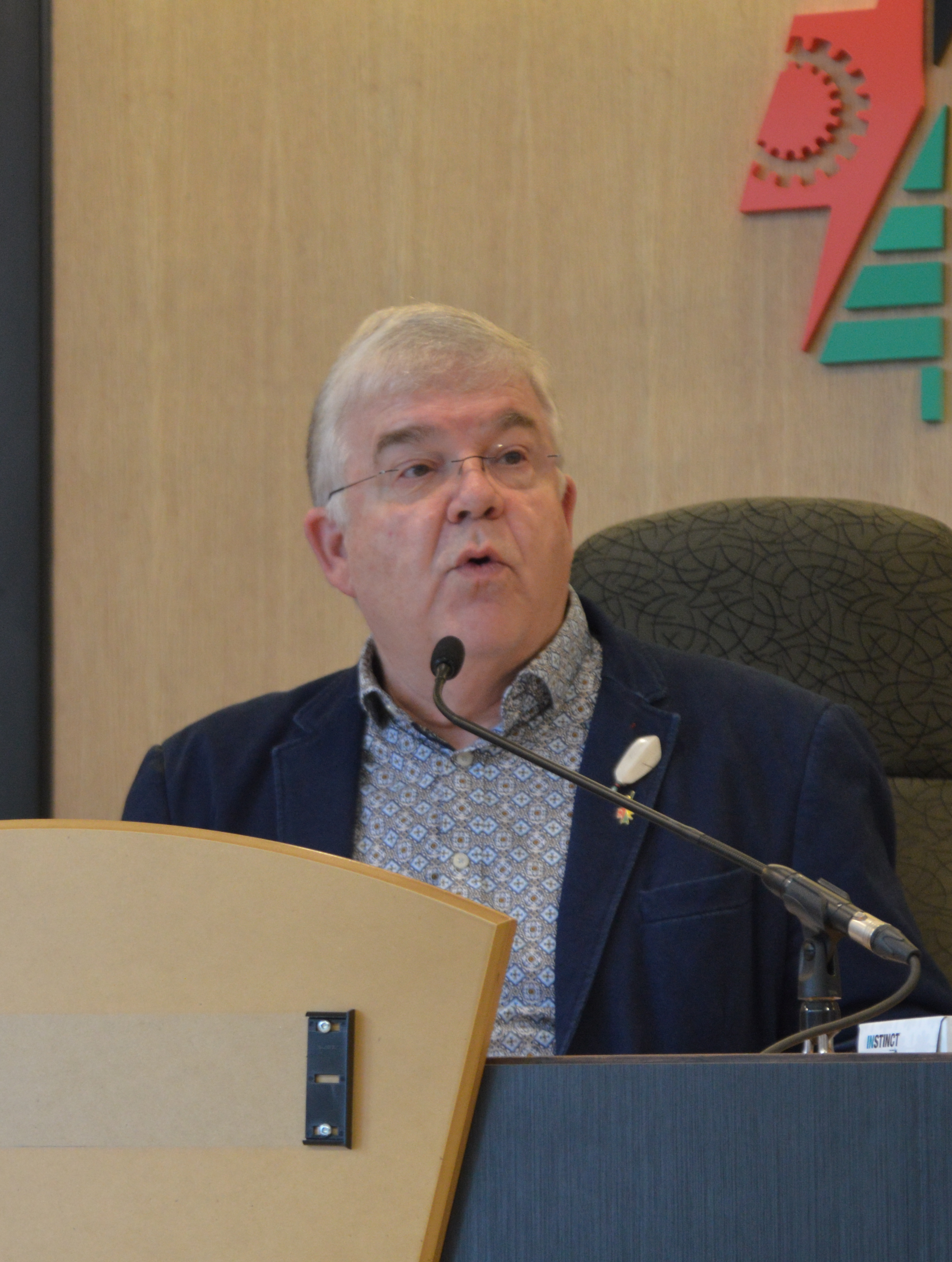

Member of the National Assembly of Quebec for Abitibi-Est
- In office December 8, 2008 – September 4, 2012
- Preceded by: Alexis Wawanoloath
- Succeeded by: Élizabeth Larouche
- In office April 14, 2003 – March 26, 2007
- Preceded by: André Pelletier
- Succeeded by: Alexis Wawanoloath

Mayor of Val-d'Or
- In office 2013–2021
- Preceded by: Fernand Trahan
- Succeeded by: Céline Brindamour

Personal details
- Born: June 23, 1955 (age 71) Saint-Hyacinthe, Quebec
- Party: Quebec Liberal Party
- Spouse: Hélène Ayotte
- Profession: Dentist
- Cabinet: Minister Responsible for Indian Affairs

Pierre Corbeil (born June 23, 1955 in Saint-Hyacinthe, Quebec) is a Quebec politician and dentist. He was the mayor of Val-d'Or, Quebec from 2013 to 2021. He was also a Member of National Assembly of Quebec (MNA) for Abitibi-Est as a member of the Quebec Liberal Party and served as a cabinet minister in the government of Jean Charest.

Corbeil went to the Université de Montréal and obtained a doctor's degree in dentistry in 1978 before becoming an associate at a local dental clinic. He would later become the manager and vice-president of the Quebec Association of Dental Surgeons. He would also be the president of the Val-d'Or Chamber of Commerce, a municipal councillor in Val-d'Or for nearly ten years and president of a local hockey league.

Corbeil jumped into provincial politics in 2003 when he was elected as MNA for Abitibi-Est as the Liberals under the leadership of Jean Charest. He would become the Minister of Forest, Wildlife and Parks in 2003 and during a cabinet shuffle in 2005 would become Minister of Natural Resources and Wildlife.

His term was marked by several closures of plants and sawmills in the lumber sector, including Domtar, which cost several hundred jobs for regions such as the Outaouais, Nord-du-Québec and Abitibi-Témiscamingue. Restructuring plans were tabled by the Minister in order to re-launch the economy of several towns affected by the closures due to the softwood lumber dispute.

Corbeil was defeated in the 2007 election by the Parti Québécois's aboriginal candidate Alexis Wawanoloath. He was re-elected in the 2008 election and named the minister responsible for Indian Affairs which was previously held by Benoit Pelletier who did not seek re-election.

Political offices
Preceded by new/modified portfolio	Minister of Forest, Wildlife and Parks (Quebec); 2003–2005	Succeeded by Wildlife and Forest: Pierre Corbeil; Parks: Line Beauchamp
Preceded by Wildlife and Forest: Pierre Corbeil; Natural Resources: Sam Hamad	Minister of Natural Resources, Forests and Wildlife and (Quebec); 2005–2007	Succeeded by Claude Bechard
Preceded by Benoit Pelletier	Minister responsible for Indian Affairs; 2008–?	Succeeded by incumbent
