= Rapid Lake =

Rapid Lake Lac-Rapide
- First Nations reserve

- Location within Quebec
- Coordinates: 47°15′N 76°42′W
- Country: Canada
- Province: Quebec
- Region: Outaouais
- Regional county: none
- Founded: 1961 (reserve)

Government
  - Chief: Tony Wawatie
  - Federal riding: Pontiac—Kitigan Zibi
  - Prov. riding: Gatineau

Area
  - Land: 1.05 km^{2} (0.41 sq mi)

Population (2022)
  - Total: 582
- Time zone: UTC-5 (EST)
  - Summer (DST): UTC-4 (EDT)
- Postal Code: J0W 2C0
- Area code: 819

Rapid Lake (French: Lac-Rapide, pronounced [lak ʁapid]) is a First Nation reserve on the western shore of Cabonga Reservoir in the Outaouais region of Quebec, Canada. It belongs to the Algonquins of Barriere Lake of the Algonquin Nation.

The reserve is an enclave within the Lac-Pythonga unorganized territory and in the middle of the La Vérendrye Wildlife Reserve. It is accessible by a short road from Quebec Route 117, approximately 80 kilometres (50 mi) north of Grand-Remous. In recent years, the community has been troubled by poor living conditions, financial difficulties, governance disputes, school closure, and protests.

== History ==
The Algonquin have long lived in the Outaouais, following a traditional nomadic life. Evidence has been found of Algonquin presence at Lake Barrière on the Ottawa River from the 18th century. Not until 1851 did the Hudson's Bay Company establish a trading post first at the former Lake Cabonga (named Kakabonga at that time). When this post burned down in 1873, it was replaced by a new post on Lake Barrière in 1874, that was identified as Mitakanabikong or Mitchikanabikong, and as Barrière from 1876 on.

On September 7, 1961, the Rapid Lake Reserve was formed when the Government of Quebec transferred control and administration of 69 acres (28 ha) in the geographic township of Émard to the Government of Canada. It took its name from the former Rapide Lake, which was submerged below the waters of Cabonga Reservoir, created in 1929. Despite these lands being reserved for use by the Algonquins, they continued to regularly visit the site at Barrière Lake about 30 kilometres (19 mi) north because of their historic ties to it. Even today, many families continue to go to Barrière Lake to practice traditional activities.

In 1995, because of a leadership dispute, some families left the reserve and settled on Jean-Peré Lake, not far to the south, also in La Vérendrye Park. Another result was that the traditional oral rules for leadership selection were codified in writing for the first time in 1996. However, leadership disputes arose again in 2006 when two separate band councils were selected by separate Elder Councils, embroiling the community in legal proceedings and governance disputes until today.

On October 6, 2008, seventy-five members of the Barrière Lake Algonquins set up a roadblock on Highway 117, demanding that the federal and provincial governments honour a resource-sharing agreement signed twenty years earlier. This protest was repeated a month later on November 19. Both protests disrupted traffic for hours by dragging logs onto the road, and ending with police confrontation.

== Education ==
There is one school on the reserve, Rapid Lake School, with classes for pre-kindergarten to Secondary grade 3. Since 1995, the school is under the jurisdiction of the Band Council, that can tailor the school's curriculum to local cultural realities in accordance with provincial standards. In addition to recognized provincial programs, the school also teaches the Algonquin language.

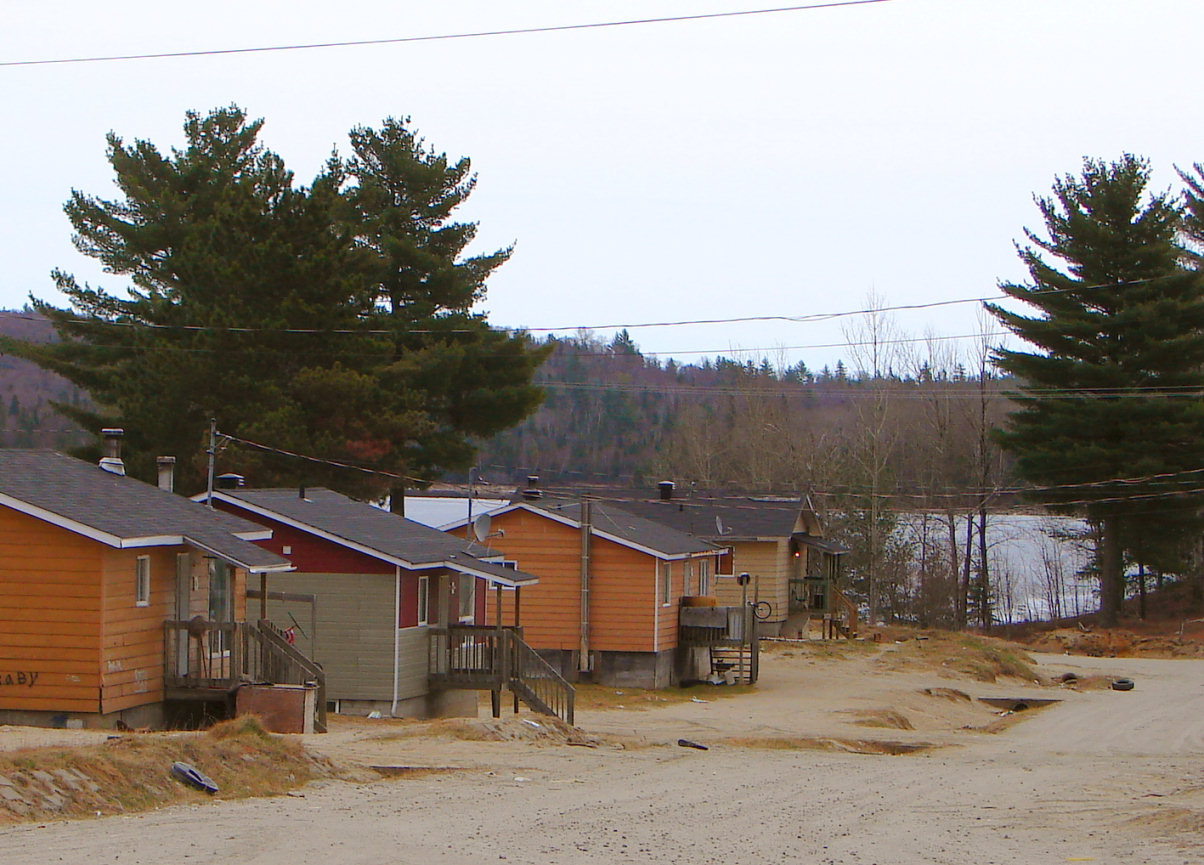
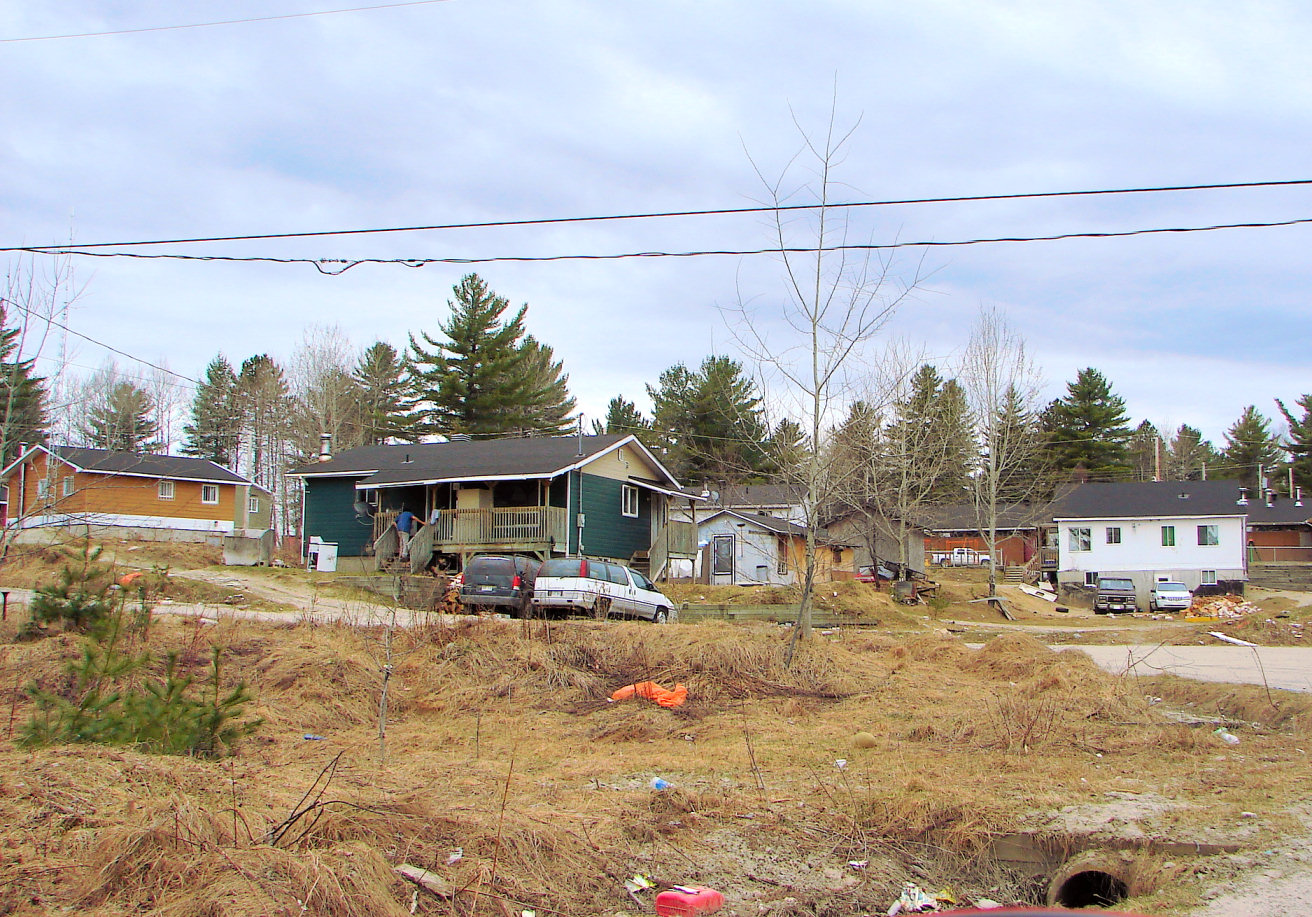
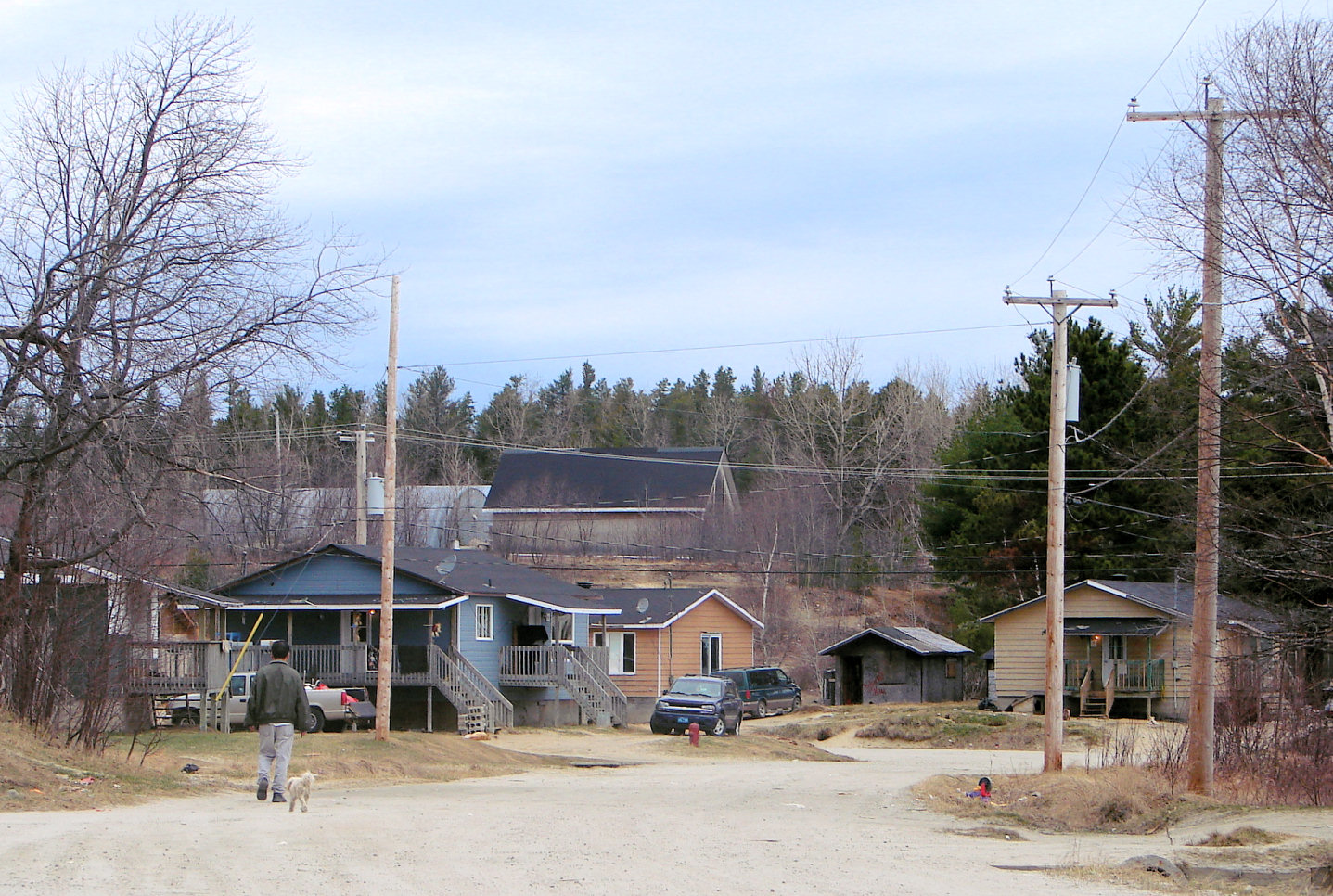
Rapid Lake reserve with Cabonga Reservoir in background
