= Stéphane Tremblay =

Quebec politician

Stéphane Tremblay MNA

Member of the National Assembly for Abitibi-Est
- Incumbent
- Assumed office October 5, 2026
- Preceded by: Pierre Dufour

Personal details
- Party: Parti Québécois

Stéphane Tremblay is a Quebec politician who was the elected to the National Assembly of Quebec for Abitibi-Est in the 2026 Quebec general election as a member of the Parti Québécois. He is a graduate from the Cégep de Sherbrooke.
