= Alexis Wawanoloath =

Canadian politician (born 1982)

MNA for Abitibi-Est
- In office April 25, 2007 – November 5, 2008
- Preceded by: Pierre Corbeil
- Succeeded by: Pierre Corbeil

Personal details
- Born: July 15, 1982 (age 44) Val-d'Or, Quebec
- Party: Parti Québécois

Alexis Wawanoloath (born July 15, 1982) is a lawyer in Indigenous peoples' law and was a Canadian politician. He was a member of National Assembly of Quebec for the riding of Abitibi-Est, representing the Parti Québécois. He is a member of the Abenaki First Nation.

The son of Christine Sioui-Wawanoloath and Gaston Larouche and descendant of Gray Lock, he studied at the Cégep de l'Abitibi-Témiscamingue. Wawanoloath worked as a technician in social work at the l'Or-et-des-Bois School Board, an educator at a child daycare centre and a host for the Centre polyvalent pour jeunes autochthones in Val-d'Or. He was the president of the youth aboriginal council and an administrator at the Abitibi-Témiscamingue youth forum.

Wawanoloath became the first aboriginal member ever elected to the National Assembly since Ludger Bastien, defeating Liberal incumbent Pierre Corbeil in the 2007 elections. He was named the PQ critic for youth by André Boisclair. He ran again in the 2008 election and was defeated by Corbeil.

On December 1, 2013, he was elected as councillor in the Abenakis of Odanak council.

He subsequently completed his law studies at the Université de Sherbrooke. In June 2021, after obtaining a Bachelor of Laws, a J.D., and completing Bar School, he became a lawyer specializing in the rights of Indigenous peoples at Neashish & Champoux. He is also a lecturer in Indigenous peoples' law at the Faculty of Law at Laval University. Wawanoloath is also interested in the world of communications; he is a contributor to Noovo Le Fil, to the Debaters of Noovo, and co-hosts the weekly radio show Kwé-Bonjour on Canal M.
