= Henri Drouin =

Canadian politician

Member of the Legislative Assembly of Quebec for Abitibi-Est
- In office 1944–1948
- Preceded by: District created
- Succeeded by: Jacques Miquelon

Personal details
- Born: December 6, 1911 L'Annonciation, Quebec
- Died: March 29, 1992 (aged 80) Amos, Quebec
- Party: Liberal

Henri Drouin (December 6, 1911 – March 29, 1992) was a Canadian lawyer, politician, and judge.

Born in L'Annonciation, Quebec, Drouin studied at the Université de Montréal before being called to the Bar of Quebec in 1936. From 1936 to 1950, he was a practising lawyer in Amos, Quebec. From 1950 to 1976 he was a judge of the Superior Court.

He was elected to the Legislative Assembly of Quebec in the riding of Abitibi-Est in 1944. A Liberal, he was defeated in 1948.
