= Rivière-Héva =

- Municipality
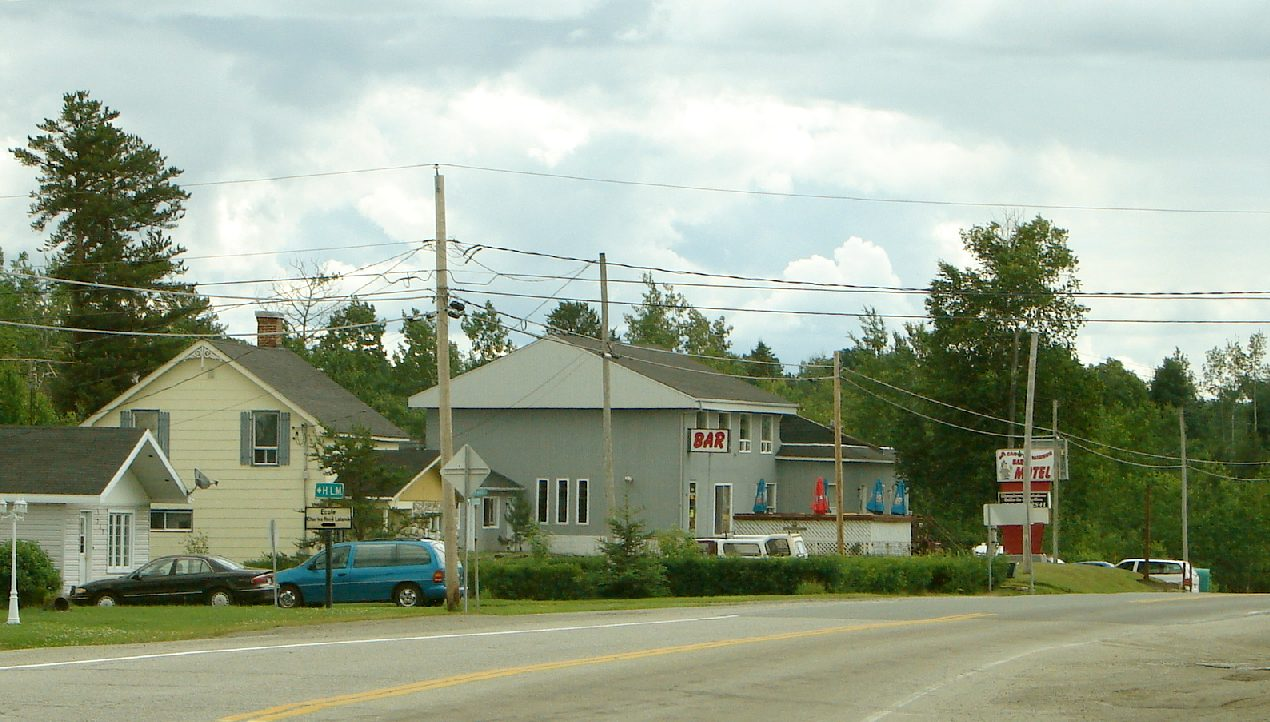

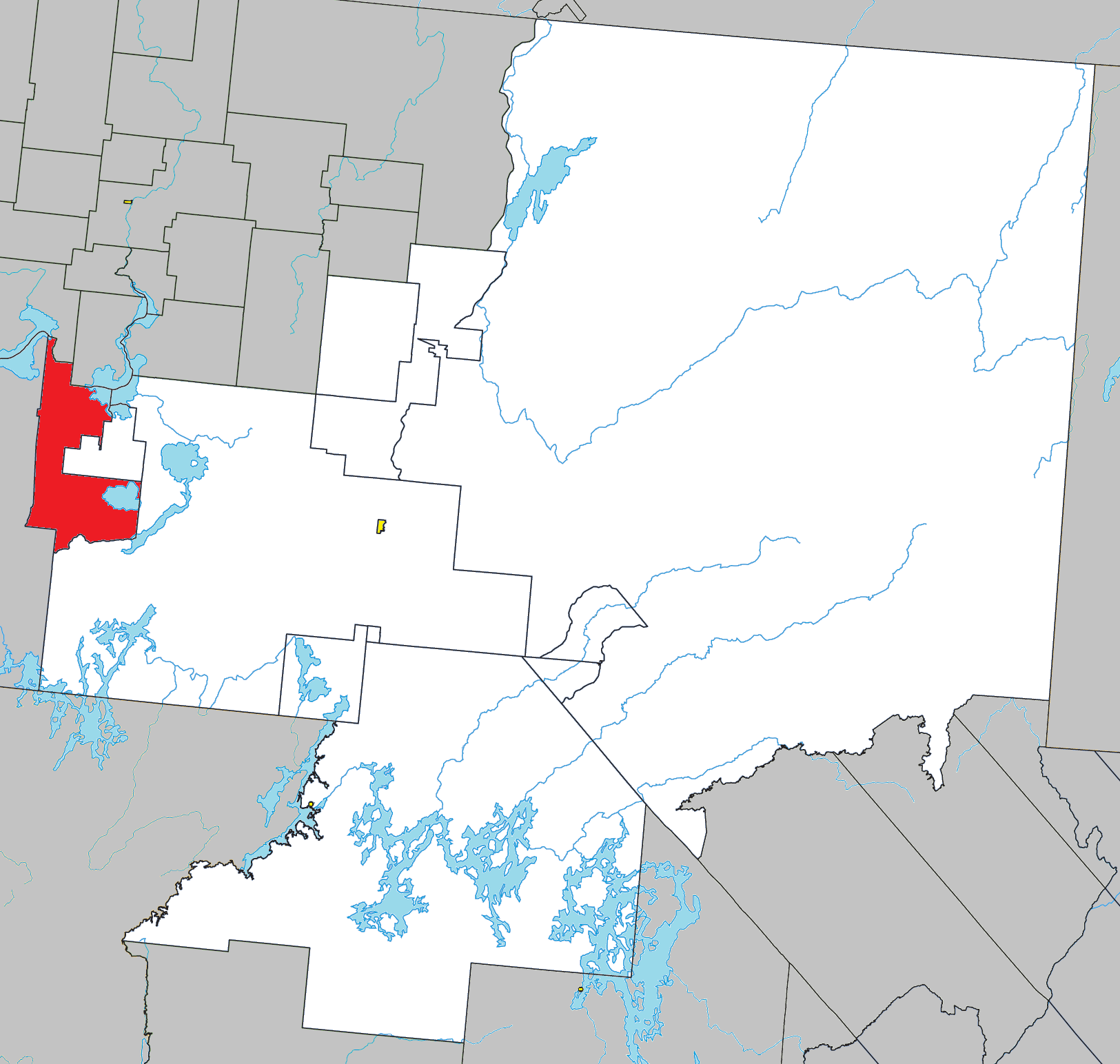
- Location within La Vallée-de-l'Or RCM

- Location in western Quebec
- Coordinates: 48°14′N 78°13′W
- Country: Canada
- Province: Quebec
- Region: Abitibi-Témiscamingue
- RCM: La Vallée-de-l'Or
- Settled: 1935
- Constituted: January 1, 1982

Government
  - Mayor: Chantal Thibault
  - Federal riding: Abitibi—Baie-James— Nunavik—Eeyou
  - Prov. riding: Abitibi-Est

Area
  - Total: 492.88 km^{2} (190.30 sq mi)
  - Land: 423.27 km^{2} (163.43 sq mi)

Population (2021)
  - Total: 1,495
  - Density: 3.5/km^{2} (9.1/sq mi)
  - Pop (2016-21): ▲5.4%
  - Dwellings: 729
- Time zone: UTC−05:00 (EST)
  - Summer (DST): UTC−04:00 (EDT)
- Postal code(s): J0Y 2H0
- Area code: 819
- Highways: R-109 R-117 (TCH)
- Website: www.riviere-heva.com

Rivière-Héva (French pronunciation: [ʁivjɛʁ eva]) is a municipality in northwestern Quebec, Canada, in the La Vallée-de-l'Or Regional County Municipality.

It is named after the Héva River, which flows through the municipality. This name, as well as Lac Heva (without accents), was used on maps from at least 1929. Its origin is uncertain, but possibly it refers to Éva Girard, wife of the surveyor Fernand Fafard, who surveyed several townships of Abitibi between 1912 and 1920. Another hypothesis is that it came from the Norman or Dutch word hève, meaning "hollow rock". Or it may even be inspired by a place in Acadia near Port-Royal called La Hève.

== History ==
In 1935 as part of the Vautrin Settlement Plan, the place was colonized and was originally called Aux Quatre-Coins (French for "At Four Corners"). It first settlers came from Amos and Barraute to cultivate the fertile soil along Lake Malartic. The settlement was named after the nearby Héva River.

On March 8, 1982, it was incorporated as a municipality from previously unorganized territory, with Guy Authier as first mayor. In 1988, the municipality acquired the former presbytery to become its town hall.

On August 29, 2009, Rivière-Héva was greatly enlarged when it absorbed the Unorganized Territory of Lac-Fouillac and the western portion of the Unorganized Territory of Lac-Granet.

== Demographics ==
Historical census populations – Rivière-Héva

| Year | Pop. | ±% |
|---|---|---|
| 1986 | 861 | — |
| 1991 | 1,043 | +21.1% |
| 1996 | 1,096 | +5.1% |
| 2001 | 1,119 | +2.1% |

| Year | Pop. | ±% |
|---|---|---|
| 2006 | 1,056 | −5.6% |
| 2011 | 1,433 | +35.7% |
| 2016 | 1,419 | −1.0% |
| 2021 | 1,495 | +5.4% |

Population counts are not adjusted for boundary changes.
Source: Statistics Canada

Mother tongue (2021):

- English as first language: 1.7%
- French as first language: 97.3%
- English and French as first language: 0.7%
- Other as first language: 0.3%

== Local government ==
List of former mayors:

- Guy Authier (1982–1985)
- Edouard Janneteau (1985–1989)
- Jean Cote (1989–...)
- Ginette Noël Gravel (...–2005)
- Réjean Guay (2005–2021)
- Chantal Thibault (2021–present)
