= Ronald Tétrault =

Canadian politician (1936–2026)

Member of the National Assembly of Quebec for Abitibi-Est
- In office 1970–1973
- Preceded by: Lucien Cliche
- Succeeded by: Roger Houde

Personal details
- Born: June 16, 1936 Val-d'Or, Quebec, Canada
- Died: October 21, 2026 (aged 90)
- Party: Ralliement créditiste du Québec

Ronald Tétrault (June 16, 1936 – October 21, 2026) was a Canadian politician in Quebec, who was a Member of the National Assembly of Quebec (MNA).

== Early life ==
Tétrault was born in Val-d'Or, Abitibi-Témiscamingue on June 16, 1936. He was the son of Social Credit politician Oza Tétrault, who was a Member of Parliament from 1968 to 1974.

== Member of the legislature ==
Tétrault ran as a candidate of the newly formed provincial wing of the Ralliement créditiste in the 1970 election and won, becoming the Member of the National Assembly for the district of Abitibi-Est.

During his term of office, the party was plagued by internal divisions. While three MNAs remained loyal to Leader Camil Samson, Tétrault and the rest of the caucus withdrew their support and appointed Armand Bois as temporary leader, until a leadership convention could determine a new leader. Eventually, Yvon Dupuis was chosen as party leader. Nonetheless, Tétrault and most of his colleagues lost their bid for re-election in the 1973 election.

== Mayor ==
Tétrault served as Mayor of Val-d'Or from 1976 to 1980 and from 1992 to 2000.

== Federal politics ==
Tétrault also ran as a Liberal candidate in the federal district of Abitibi in the 1979 federal election. He finished second against Social Credit candidate Armand Caouette.

== Death ==
Tétrault died on October 21, 2026, at the age of 90.
