= Jacques Miquelon =

Canadian politician (1911–2004)

Member of the Legislative Assembly of Quebec for Abitibi-Est
- In office 1948–1960
- Preceded by: Henri Drouin
- Succeeded by: Lucien Cliche

Personal details
- Born: October 4, 1911 Danville, Quebec
- Died: June 16, 2004 (aged 92) Montreal, Quebec
- Party: Union Nationale
- Relations: André Bourbeau, nephew Jacques Picard, grandfather

Jacques Miquelon (French pronunciation: [ʒak miklɔ̃]; October 4, 1911 – June 16, 2004) was a lawyer, judge and political figure in Quebec. He represented Abitibi-Est in the Legislative Assembly of Quebec from 1948 to 1960 as a member of the Union Nationale.

He was born in Danville, Quebec, the son of Arsène-Cyr Miquelon and Éveline Picard, who was the daughter of Jacques Picard. Educated in Danville, at the Séminaire de Québec and at the Université Laval, Miquelon was called to the Quebec bar in 1934 and set up practice first at Quebec City and then, in 1937, at Malartic. Miquelon served as solicitor for the Department of the Attorney General and for the Liquor Commission at Amos. He was director of two mining companies and also was president of the Chamber of Commerce for Malartic. He married Suzanne Turcotte in 1938; he later married Germaine Voyer after his Turcotte's death. In 1946, he was named King's Counsel. Miquelon served in the Quebec cabinet as Minister of State from 1952 to 1959, Attorney General in 1959 and 1960, and Minister of Lands and Forests in 1960. He was defeated when he ran for reelection in 1960 and 1962. In 1962, Miquelon returned to the practice of law in Montreal. From 1968 to 1978, he was judge in the Social Welfare Court at Montreal. He died in Montreal at the age of 92.

His nephew André Bourbeau also served in the Quebec assembly.
