= Belcourt, Quebec =

Belcourt
- Municipality
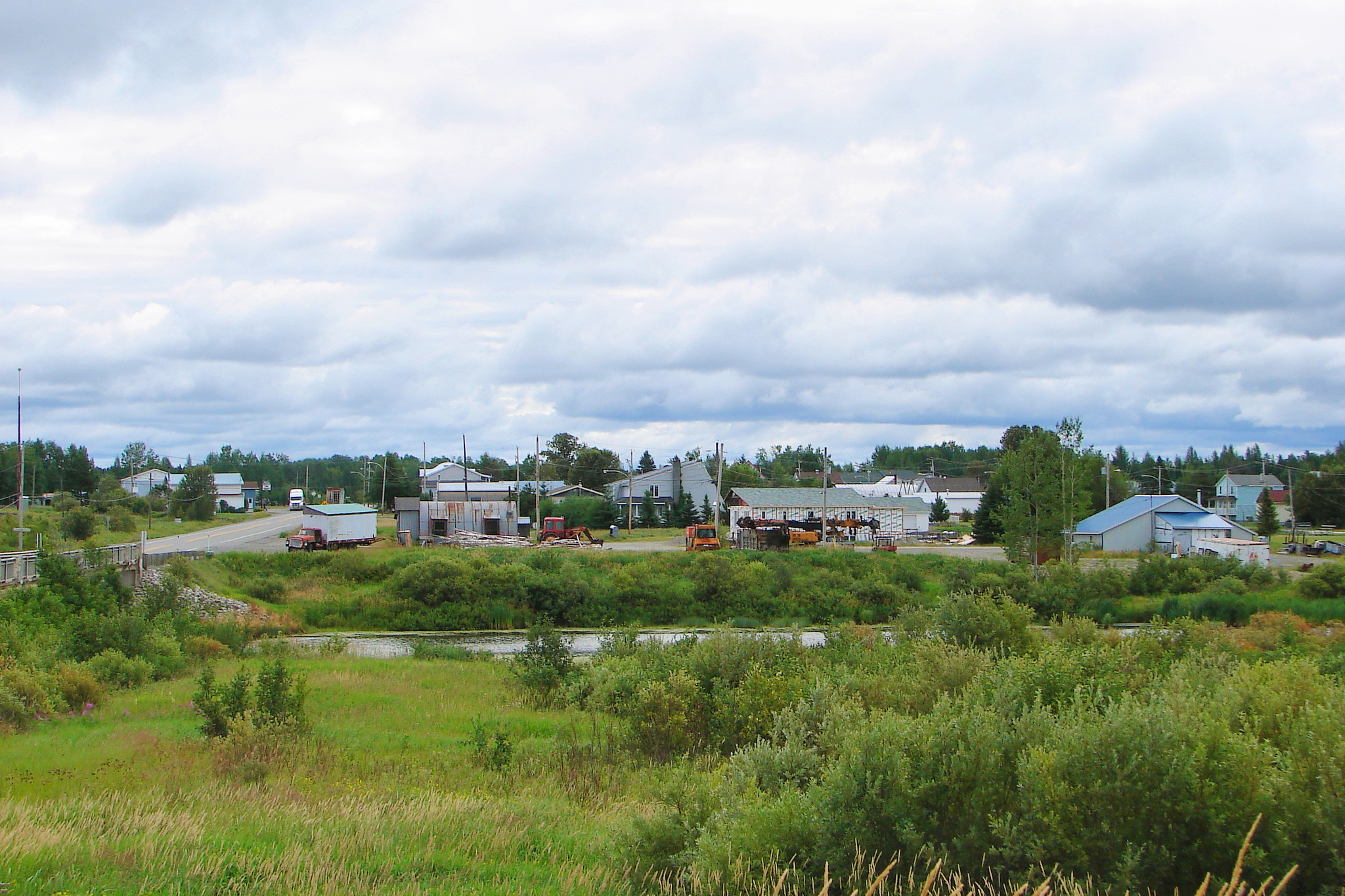

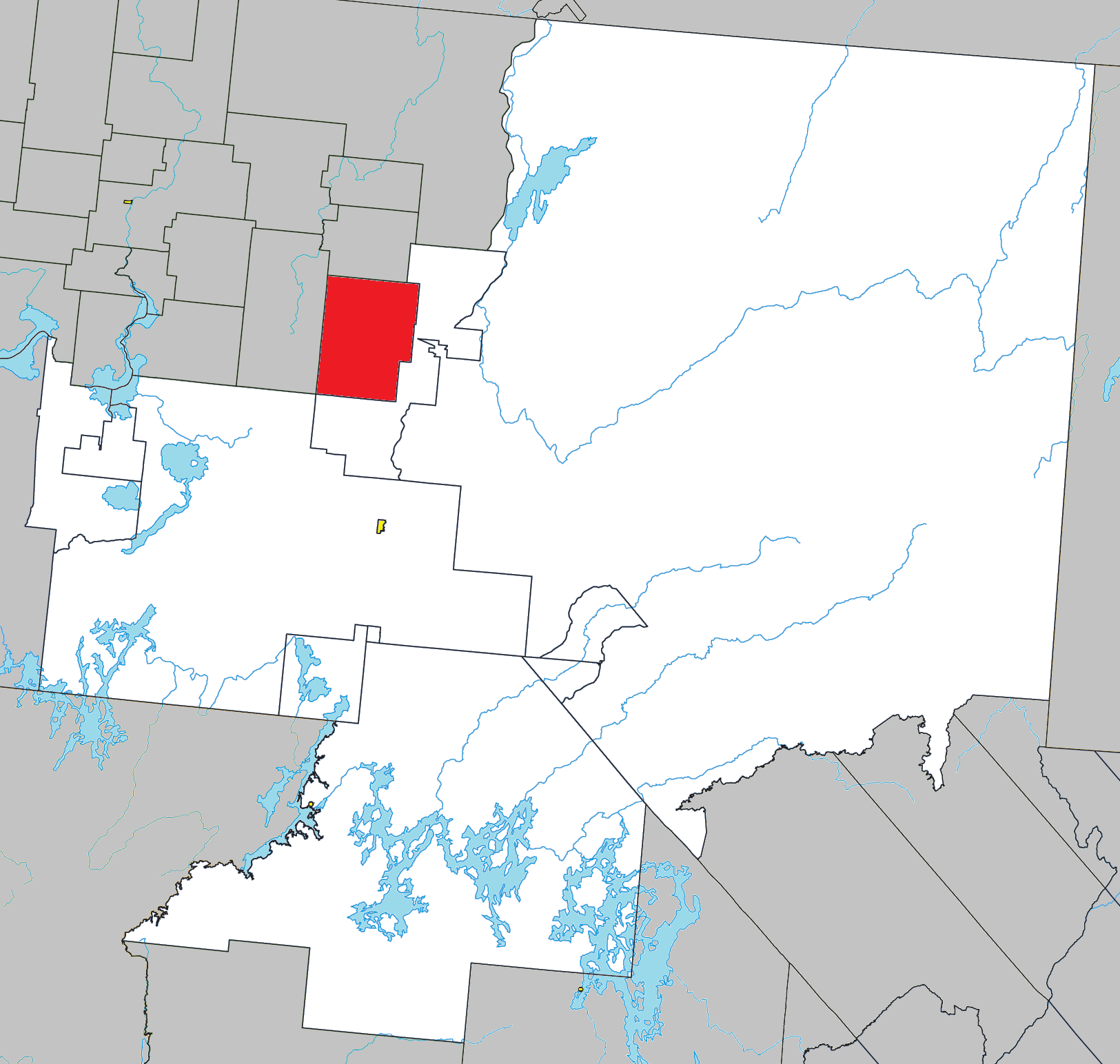
- Location within La Vallée-de-l'Or RCM

- Location in province of Quebec
- Coordinates: 48°24′N 77°21′W
- Country: Canada
- Province: Quebec
- Region: Abitibi-Témiscamingue
- RCM: La Vallée-de-l'Or
- Settled: 1915
- Constituted: October 24, 1918

Government
  - Mayor: Lise Lafrance (2025)
  - Federal riding: Abitibi—Baie-James— Nunavik—Eeyou
  - Prov. riding: Abitibi-Est

Area
  - Total: 423.85 km^{2} (163.65 sq mi)
  - Land: 409.74 km^{2} (158.20 sq mi)

Population (2021)
  - Total: 219
  - Density: 0.5/km^{2} (1.3/sq mi)
  - Pop (2016-21): ▼2.7%
  - Dwellings: 120
- Time zone: UTC−5 (EST)
  - Summer (DST): UTC−4 (EDT)
- Postal code(s): J0Y 2M0
- Area code: 819
- Highways: R-386
- Website: munbelcourt.ca

Belcourt (French pronunciation: [bɛlkuʁ]) is a municipality in northwestern Quebec, Canada, in the La Vallée-de-l'Or Regional County Municipality.

Its economy depends on forestry, as well as businesses and industries in Senneterre.

== History ==
Following the construction of the National Transcontinental Railway, the area opened up for colonization. The new settlement was originally called Café or Coffee, taken from the railway station name, but renamed to Goulet, after the first permanent settler, Louis Goulet. In 1915, he arrived with his family and employees, 68 people in all, to operate a sawmill that he had built on the banks of the Taschereau River, between Carpentier and Courville Lakes.

In 1918, the place was incorporated as the United Township Municipality of Carpentier-et-Courville, but the settlement continued to be called Goulet. Since there already was a Goulet Post Office in Bellechasse County, it was renamed to Belcourt in 1927, in honour of Napoléon-Antoine Belcourt (1860-1932). In 1958, the municipality was also renamed and changed statutes at the same time to become the Municipality of Belcourt.

In 1962, it lost part of its territory when the Municipality of Champneuf was created.

== Demographics ==
Historical census populations – Belcourt, Quebec

Year	Pop.	±%
1921	297	—
1931	527	+77.4%
1941	546	+3.6%
1951	460	−15.8%
1956	495	+7.6%
1961	544	+9.9%

Year	Pop.	±%
1966	450	−17.3%
1971	387	−14.0%
1976	375	−3.1%
1981	395	+5.3%
1986	345	−12.7%
1991	292	−15.4%

Year	Pop.	±%
1996	285	−2.4%
2001	272	−4.6%
2006	256	−5.9%
2011	239	−6.6%
2016	225	−5.9%
2021	219	−2.7%

Population counts are not adjusted for boundary changes.
Source: Statistics Canada

Private dwellings occupied by usual residents (2021): 114 (total dwellings: 120)

Mother tongue (2021):

- English as first language: 2 %
- French as first language: 98 %
- English and French as first language: 0 %
- Other as first language: 0 %

== Local government ==
List of former mayors:

- Alphonse Vézina (1924)
- Francis Simard (1925)
- Roméo Castonguay (1927)
- Albéric Trempe (1927–1933)
- Alfred Goulet (1933–1937)
- William Abel (1937–1939)
- Sylva St-Amant (1939–1945)
- Émile Garneau (1945–1957, 1963–1965, 1969–1972)
- Raoul Roy (1957–1959)
- Roger Langlois (1959–1963)
- Irenée Lizotte (1965–1969)
- Gaston Labbée (1972–1975)
- Roger Fairfield (1975–1981)
- Jacqueline Goulet (1981–1985)
- Marcel Vaillancourt (1985–1997)
- Michel Lahaie (1997–2005)
- Carol Nolet (2005–2021)
- Guylaine Labbée (2021–2025)
- Lise Lafrance (2025–present)
