= Élizabeth Larouche =

Canadian politician

MNA for Abitibi-Est
- In office September 4, 2012 – April 7, 2014
- Preceded by: Pierre Corbeil
- Succeeded by: Guy Bourgeois

Personal details
- Party: Parti Québécois

Élizabeth Larouche is a former Canadian politician, who was elected to the National Assembly of Quebec in the 2012 provincial election. She was defeated by Guy Bourgeois of the Quebec Liberal Party in the 2014 election. She represented the electoral district of Abitibi-Est as a member of the Parti Québécois caucus.
