= André Pelletier (Abitibi politician) =

Canadian politician (born 1941)

MNA for Abitibi-Est
- In office September 12, 1994 – April 14, 2003
- Preceded by: Raymond Savoie
- Succeeded by: Pierre Corbeil

Personal details
- Born: 23 February 1941 Évain (Rouyn-Noranda), Quebec, Canada
- Parents: Hector Pelletier (Father), Miner; Madeleine Lachapelle (Mother), Housewife

André Pelletier (born 23 February 1941) is a former Canadian politician and a two-term Member of the National Assembly of Quebec from 1994 to 2003.

== Life ==
He was a city councillor in Val-d'Or from 1976 to 1980, and then mayor from 1980 to 1992.

He ran successfully as the Parti Québécois candidate in the 1994 Quebec election in Abitibi-Est. He was re-elected in 1998 election, but he did not run for re-election in the 2003.
