= Minister of Energy and Resources (Quebec) =

The Minister of Energy and Resources is a former government ministry in the Canadian province of Quebec.

The ministry was discontinued in 1994, when Daniel Johnson became premier of Quebec. The last minister to hold the position was Lise Bacon.
