= La Vallée-de-l'Or Regional County Municipality =

La Vallée-de-l'Or
- Regional county municipality
- Coordinates: 48°23′N 77°14′W
- Country: Canada
- Province: Quebec
- Region: Abitibi-Témiscamingue
- Effective: April 8, 1981
- County seat: Val-d'Or

Government
  - Type: Prefecture
  - Prefect: Martin Ferron

Area
  - Total: 27,349.47 km^{2} (10,559.69 sq mi)
  - Land: 24,094.84 km^{2} (9,303.07 sq mi)

Population (2021)
  - Total: 43,347
  - Density: 1.8/km^{2} (4.7/sq mi)
  - Change (2016-21): ▲0.3%
  - Dwellings: 20,944
- Time zone: UTC−5 (EST)
  - Summer (DST): UTC−4 (EDT)
- Area code: 819
- Website: mrcvo.qc.ca

La Vallée-de-l'Or (French pronunciation: [la vale də lɔʁ]) is a regional county municipality in the Abitibi-Témiscamingue region in Northwestern Quebec, Canada. The seat is in Val-d'Or. It is named for its gold deposits in the Harricana River and Bell River valleys.

== History ==
Originally part of Abitibi RCM, it was created in April 1981 as Vallée-de-l'Or Regional County Municipality. The name, adjusted to La Vallée-de-l'Or on October 11, 2003, means "The Valley of Gold" and refers to the area at the sources of the Harricana River where the Abitibi gold rush took place in the 1930s.

== Subdivisions ==
There are 10 subdivisions within the RCM:

Cities & Towns (3)

- Malartic
- Senneterre
- Val-d'Or

Municipalities (2)

- Belcourt
- Rivière-Héva

Parishes (1)

- Senneterre

Unorganized Territory (4)

- Lac-Granet
- Lac-Metei
- Matchi-Manitou
- Réservoir-Dozois

Indian Settlement or Reserve (2)
(not associated with RCM)

- Kitcisakik
- Lac-Simon

== Demographics ==
=== Population ===
Canada census – La Vallée-de-l'Or community profile

	2021	2016	2011
Population	43,347 (+0.3% from 2016)	43,226 (+0.8% from 2011)	42,896 (+2.4% from 2006)
Land area	24,094.84 km^{2} (9,303.07 sq mi)	24,292.04 km^{2} (9,379.21 sq mi)	24,294.28 km^{2} (9,380.07 sq mi)
Population density	1.8/km^{2} (4.7/sq mi)	1.8/km^{2} (4.7/sq mi)	1.8/km^{2} (4.7/sq mi)
Median age	42.8 (M: 42.4, F: 43.6)	42.2 (M: 41.4, F: 43.2)	41.3 (M: 40.3, F: 42.3)
Private dwellings	20,944 (total) 19,648 (occupied)	20,224 (total) 19,040 (occupied)	19,532 (total)
Median household income	$73,500	$62,540	$53,665

References: 2021 2016 2011

Historical Census Data - La Vallée-de-l'Or Regional County Municipality, Quebec

Year	Pop.	±%
1986	40,344	—
1991	43,121	+6.9%
1996	44,389	+2.9%
2001	42,375	−4.5%

Year	Pop.	±%
2006	41,896	−1.1%
2011	42,896	+2.4%
2016	43,226	+0.8%
2021	43,347	+0.3%

Source: Statistics Canada

=== Language ===
Canada Census Mother Tongue - La Vallée-de-l'Or Regional County Municipality, Quebec
Census	Total	French			English			French & English			Other		
Year	Responses	Count	Trend	Pop %	Count	Trend	Pop %	Count	Trend	Pop %	Count	Trend	Pop %
2016	42,780	39,735	▲1.0%	92.88%	1,105	▼8.3%	2.58%	250	▼13.8%	0.58%	1,690	▲13.8%	3.95%
2011	42,340	39,360	▲3.6%	92.96%	1,205	▲25.5%	2.85%	290	▲1.8%	0.68%	1,485	▼27.7%	3.51%
2006	41,275	37,975	▼2.1%	92.00%	960	▼5.4%	2.33%	285	▼5.0%	0.69%	2,055	▲18.4%	4.98%
2001	41,845	38,795	▼4.4%	92.71%	1,015	▼19.8%	2.43%	300	▼15.5%	0.72%	1,735	▼8.1%	4.15%
1996	43,780	40,565	n/a	92.66%	1,265	n/a	2.89%	355	n/a	0.81%	1,595	n/a	3.64%

== Transportation ==
=== Access Routes ===
Highways and numbered routes that run through the municipality, including external routes that start or finish at the county border:

- Autoroutes
  - None
- Principal Highways
  - R-109
  - R-111
  - R-113
  - R-117 (TCH)
- Secondary Highways
  - R-386
  - R-397
- External Routes
  - None

== See also ==
- List of regional county municipalities and equivalent territories in Quebec
