= La Vérendrye Wildlife Reserve =

Wildlife reserve in Quebec, Canada

- Réserve faunique La Vérendrye
- La Vérendrye Wildlife Reserve in 2026

- Location within Quebec
- Location: Quebec, Canada
- Nearest city: Grand-Remous, Quebec
- Coordinates: 47°02′N 76°32′W
- Area: 12,589 km^{2} (4,861 sq mi)
- Established: 1939
- Governing body: Sépaq
- Website: www.sepaq.com/rf/lvy/en/

La Vérendrye Wildlife Reserve is one of the largest reserves in the province of Quebec, Canada, covering 12,589 square kilometres (4,861 mi^{2}) of contiguous land and lake area (Assinica Reserve is the largest in the province, but its territory is broken up in four non-contiguous parts). It is named after Pierre Gaultier de Varennes, sieur de La Vérendrye, a French-Canadian explorer. Located 180 kilometres (110 mi) north of Ottawa (Canada’s capital), it is traversed from south to north by Route 117.

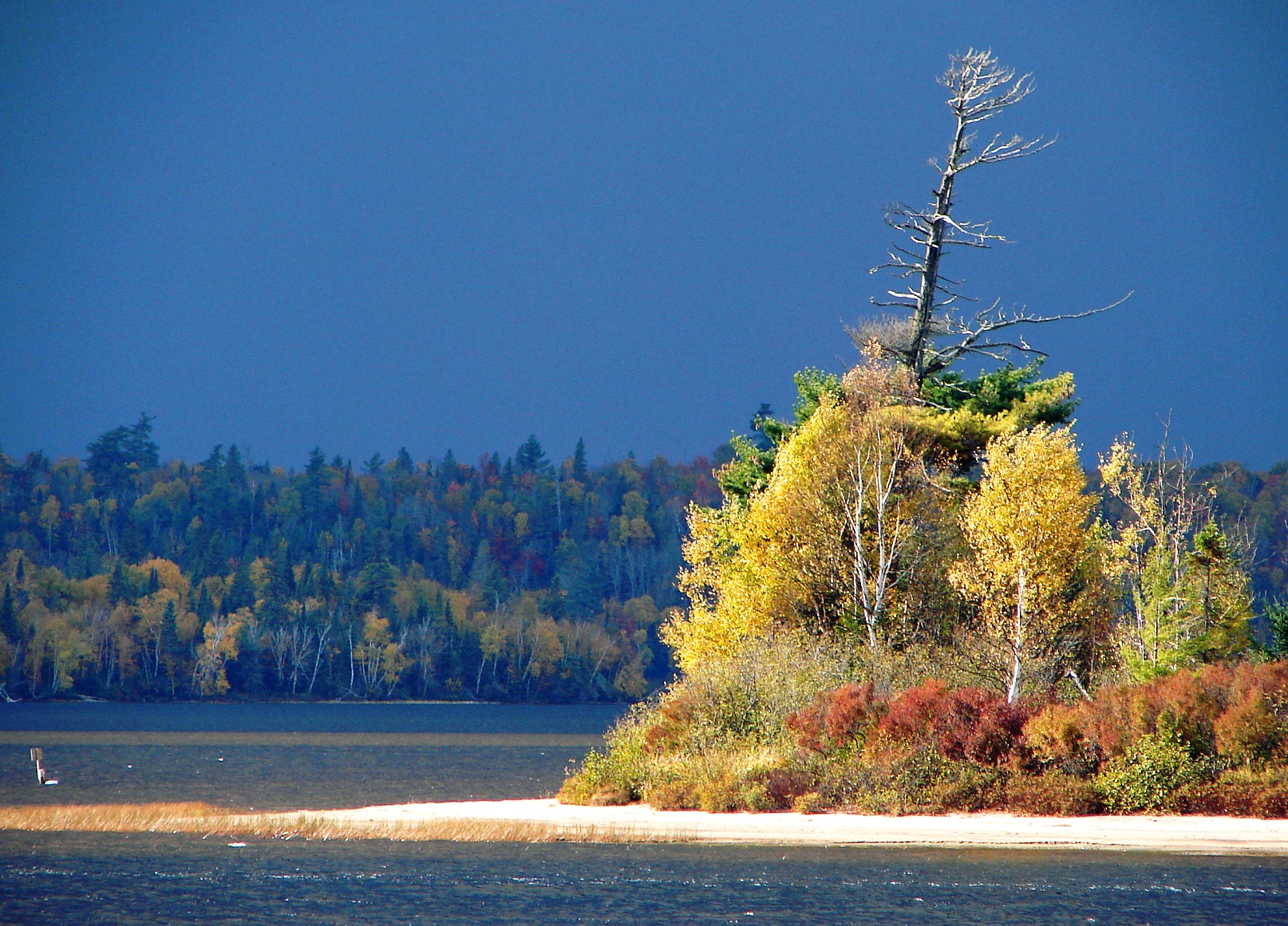
Jean-Peré Lake at Le Domaine

With more than 4000 lakes and rivers and two huge reservoirs (Cabonga and Dozois), the wilderness territory is a venue of choice for outdoor enthusiasts. In addition to hunting and fishing, it also offers the opportunity to practice wilderness camping or canoe camping on more than 800 kilometres (500 mi) of interconnecting canoe routes.

Two First Nation communities are found within the boundaries of the wildlife reserve: Kitcisakik on Great Victoria Lake and Lac-Rapide on Cabonga Reservoir.

== History ==
The reserve was established in 1939 with the name Reserve Route-Mont-Laurier-Senneterre. It was that year that the road linking Mont-Laurier to Abitibi (now known as Route 117) was expected to be completed. Because the new road made an exceptionally rich wildlife territory accessible to thousands of hunters and fishermen, its protection thus became important.

In 1950, the government transformed the hunting and fishing reservation into a park and renamed it in honour of the explorer Pierre Gaultier de Varennes, sieur de La Vérendrye, on the 200th anniversary of his death (1749). It gained the status of wildlife reserve in 1979.

Two women with a large fish at La Vérendrye, about 1960

== Activity ==
La Vérendrye Reserve is a popular park for outdoor activities in all seasons. In the winter, snowmobiling can be done on trails through the park. In the spring, there are whitewater rivers to canoe, particularly the Gens de Terre River. In the summer, it is a great place for fishing, hiking, swimming, and canoe camping. In the autumn, hunting is permitted. Popular game animals include moose and white-tailed deer (black bear hunting in the spring). Permits and payment of fees are required for any of these activities.

Le Domaine is the community along Route 117 where most of the park services are concentrated, and permits, fuel, and food can be obtained.

== Flora ==
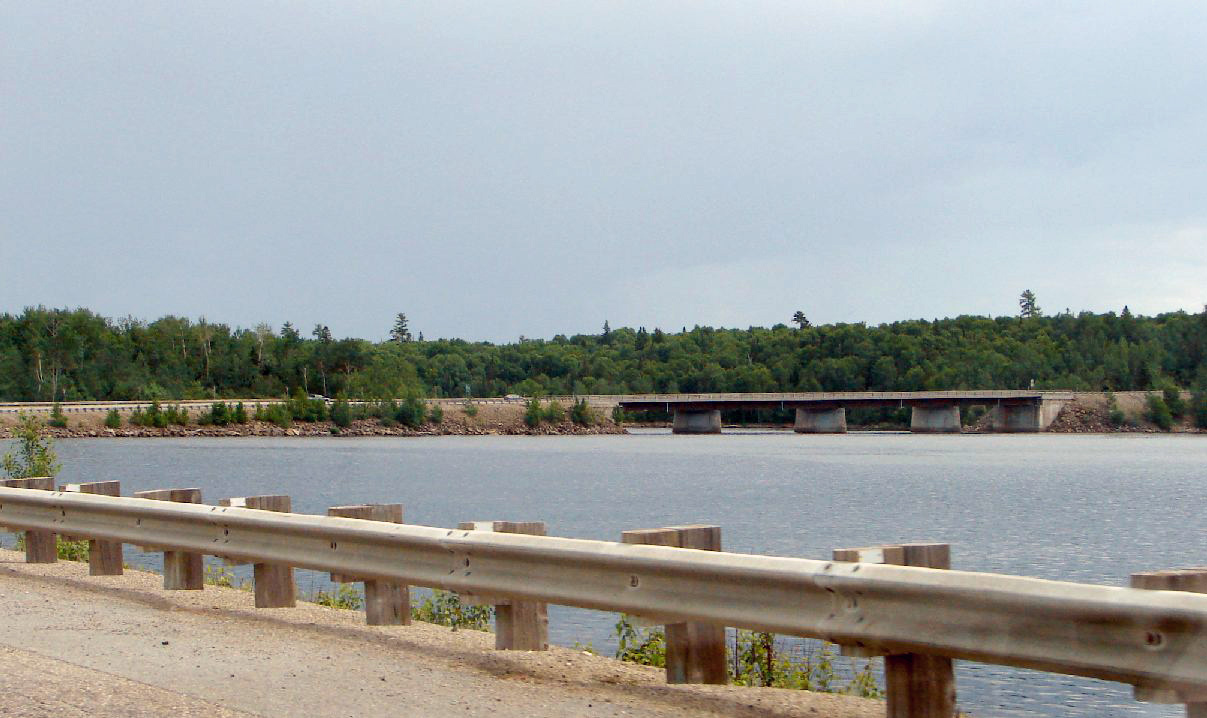
Dozois Reservoir and Highway 117

La Vérendrye's landscape is typical of the Canadian Shield. The main tree species include black spruce, white spruce, jack pine, eastern white pine, red pine, and white birch.

== Fauna ==
There are over 40 species of mammals, including moose, white-tailed deer, black bears, wolves, gray and red foxes, beavers, snowshoe hares (among others), and over 150 species of birds, including spruce grouse and ruffed grouse.

=== Fish ===
Walleye, northern pike, lake trout (salmon trout), smallmouth bass, and lake sturgeon.

A few bodies of water, in the southern part of the reserve, contain brook trout (speckled trout).
