= Centre de services scolaire des Laurentides =

The Centre de services scolaire des Laurentides is a francophone school service centre in the Canadian province of Quebec, headquartered in Sainte-Agathe-des-Monts. It comprises several primary schools and high schools across municipalities in the Laurentides region. The commission is overseen by a board of elected school trustees.

== Schools ==
Secondary schools:

- École Polyvalente des Monts (Sainte-Agathe-des-Monts)
- Pavillon Sacré-Cœur (Saint-Donat)
- École Vert-Pré (Huberdeau)
- École secondaire Curé-Mercure (Mont-Tremblant)
- École secondaire Augustin-Norbert-Morin (Sainte-Adèle)

Primary schools:

- Chante-au-Vent (Sainte-Adèle)
- Fleur-des-Neiges (Sainte-Agathe-des-Monts)
- L'Arc-en-ciel (Huberdeau)
- L'Odyssée (Mont-Tremblant)
- La Relève (La Minerve)
- Le Carrefour (Saint-Rémi-d'Amherst)
- Le Tremplin (Labelle)
- Lionel-Groulx / Monseigneur-Bazinet (Has two campuses in Sainte-Agathe-des-Monts: Pavillon Lionel-Groulx and Pavillon Monseigneur-Bazinet)
- Monseigneur-Lionel-Sheffer (Sainte-Marguerite-du-Lac-Masson)
- Monseigneur-Ovide-Charlebois (Sainte-Marguerite-du-Lac-Masson)
- Notre-Dame-de-la-Sagesse (Sainte-Agathe-des-Monts)
- Campus primaire Mont-Tremblant (has four campuses in Mont-Tremblant: Pavillon Fleur-Soleil, Pavillon La Ribambelle, Pavillon Tournesol, and Pavillon Trois-Saisons)
- Sacré-Cœur (Has two campuses in Saint-Donat: Pavillon Notre-Dame-de-Lourdes and Pavillon Sainte-Bernadette)
- Saint-Jean-Baptiste / Sainte-Marie (has two campuses in Val-David: Pavillon Saint-Jean-Baptiste and Pavillon Sainte-Marie)
- Saint-Joseph (Sainte-Adèle)
- École primaire de Saint-Sauveur (has two campuses in Saint-Sauveur: Pavillon De la Vallée and Pavillon Marie-Rose)
