= YCC =

YCC may refer to:

- National Young Composers Challenge
- Volvo YCC, a concept car from Volvo
- YCbCr a family of colour spaces used in video systems
- YCC, the IATA code for Cornwall Regional Airport
- Y Chromosome Consortium, a geneticist team who work to standardize classification for human Y-DNA
- Y Country Camp, a Jewish summer camp near Montreal
- Yield curve control, a monetary policy action by a central bank
- Yorkshire Coast College a further education college located over three sites in Scarborough, North Yorkshire, England
- Young Comrades Club, founded 1927, the youth wing of the Communist Party of Australia
- Young Critics Circle, an award-giving body for cinema in the Philippines
- Youth Conservation Corps, a youth program of the U.S. National Park Service providing jobs and environmental education
