= Ivry-sur-le-Lac =

- Municipality
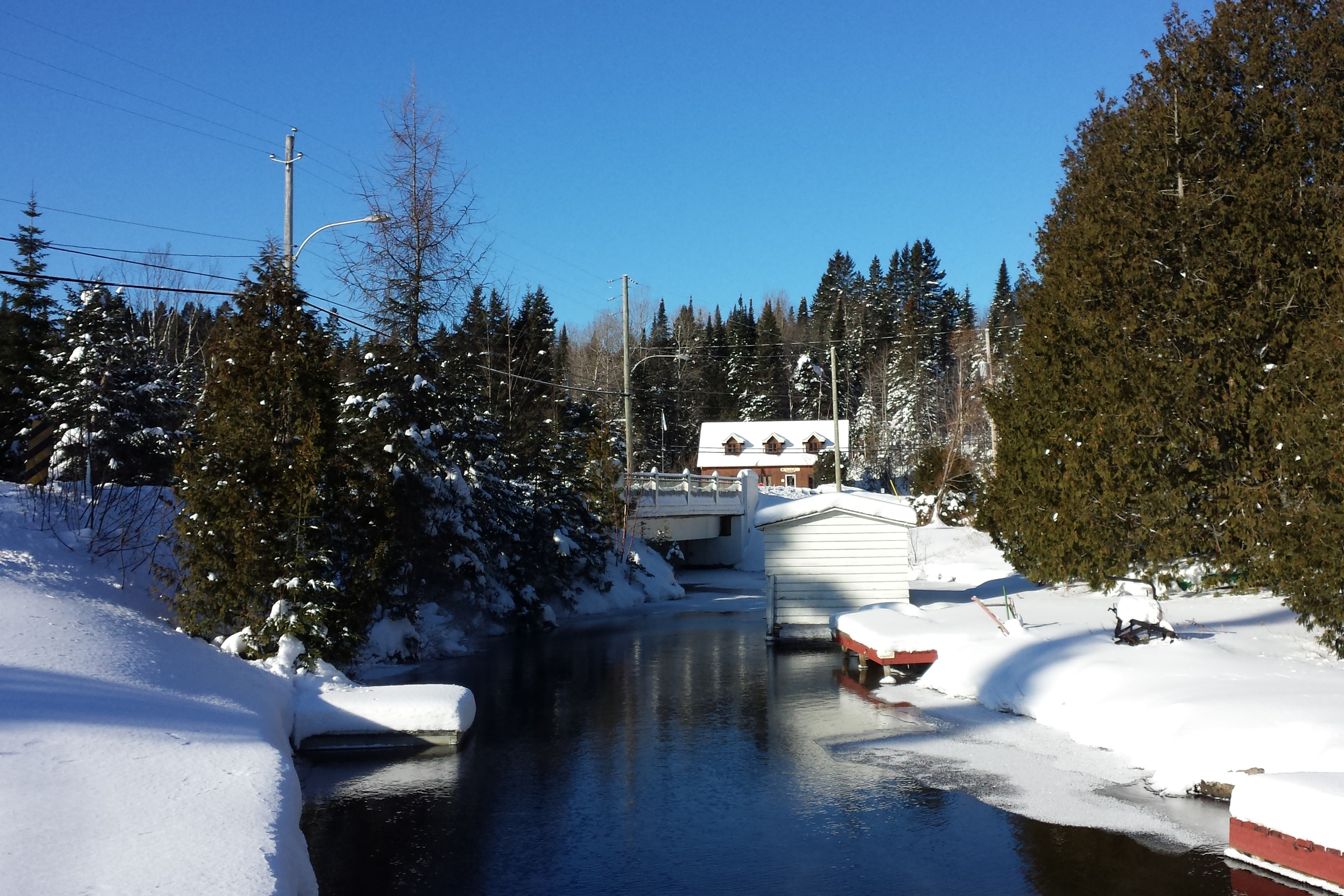

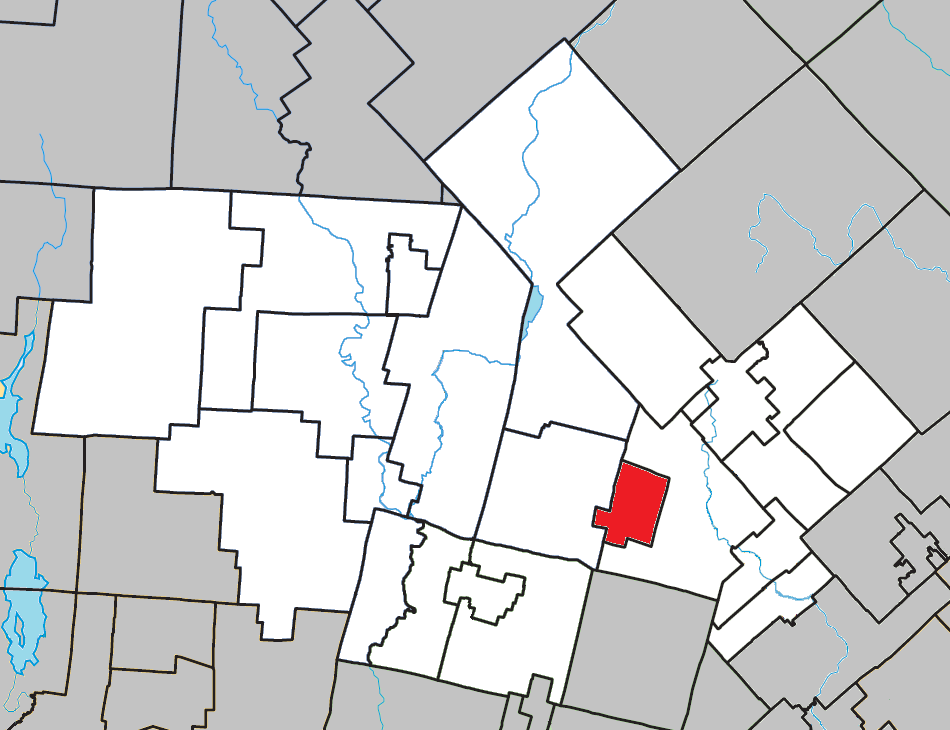
- Location within Les Laurentides RCM

- Location in central Quebec
- Coordinates: 46°04′N 74°21′W
- Country: Canada
- Province: Quebec
- Region: Laurentides
- RCM: Les Laurentides
- Settled: 1852
- Constituted: January 1, 2006

Government
  - Mayor: André Ibghy
  - Fed. riding: Laurentides—Labelle
  - Prov. riding: Bertrand

Area
  - Total: 34.91 km^{2} (13.48 sq mi)
  - Land: 29.30 km^{2} (11.31 sq mi)

Population (2021)
  - Total: 391
  - Density: 13.3/km^{2} (34/sq mi)
  - Change 2016-21: ▲1.0%
  - Dwellings: 398
- Time zone: UTC−5 (EST)
  - Summer (DST): UTC−4 (EDT)
- Postal code(s): J8C 2Z8
- Area code: 819
- Highways: R-117 (TCH)
- Website: www.ivry-sur-le-lac.qc.ca

Ivry-sur-le-Lac (French pronunciation: [ivʁi syʁ lə lak], literally Ivry on the Lake) is a village and municipality in the Laurentides region of Quebec, Canada, part of the Les Laurentides Regional County Municipality. The municipality completely encompasses Lake Manitou which is a popular cottage vacation location.

The village of Ivry-sur-le-Lac is located at the head of the north-east bay (Lacasse Bay), and the hamlet of Lac-Manitou-Sud is at the head of the south-east bay of Lake Manitou.

== History ==
From 1852 onwards, settlers came to the shores of Lake Manitou because of its beauty. In 1891, Countess Angela Ogier d'Ivry, from Le Mans (France), bought a farm for her son Viscount Raoul Ogier d'Ivry, who chose the name of the new municipality which formed in 1912 by separating from the parishes of Sainte-Agathe and Saint-Faustin. The post office opened in 1903, designated as Lac-Manitou until 1913 and as Ivry-Nord until 1958.

On February 27, 2002, Ivry-sur-le-Lac was amalgamated with Sainte-Agathe-des-Monts in province-wide municipal reorganizations, but it was reinstated as a municipality on January 1, 2006.

== Demographics ==
Historical census populations – Ivry-sur-le-Lac

Year	Pop.	±%
1921	292	—
1931	273	−6.5%
1941	306	+12.1%
1951	263	−14.1%
1956	234	−11.0%
1961	244	+4.3%
1966	235	−3.7%
1971	290	+23.4%
1976	229	−21.0%

Year	Pop.	±%
1981	309	+34.9%
1986	194	−37.2%
1991	311	+60.3%
1996	346	+11.3%
2001	401	+15.9%
2006	397	−1.0%
2011	425	+7.1%
2016	387	−8.9%
2021	391	+1.0%

Source: Statistics Canada

Private dwellings occupied by usual residents (2021): 200 (total dwellings: 398)

Mother tongue (2021):

- English as first language: 24.4%
- French as first language: 71.8%
- Other as first language: 3.8%
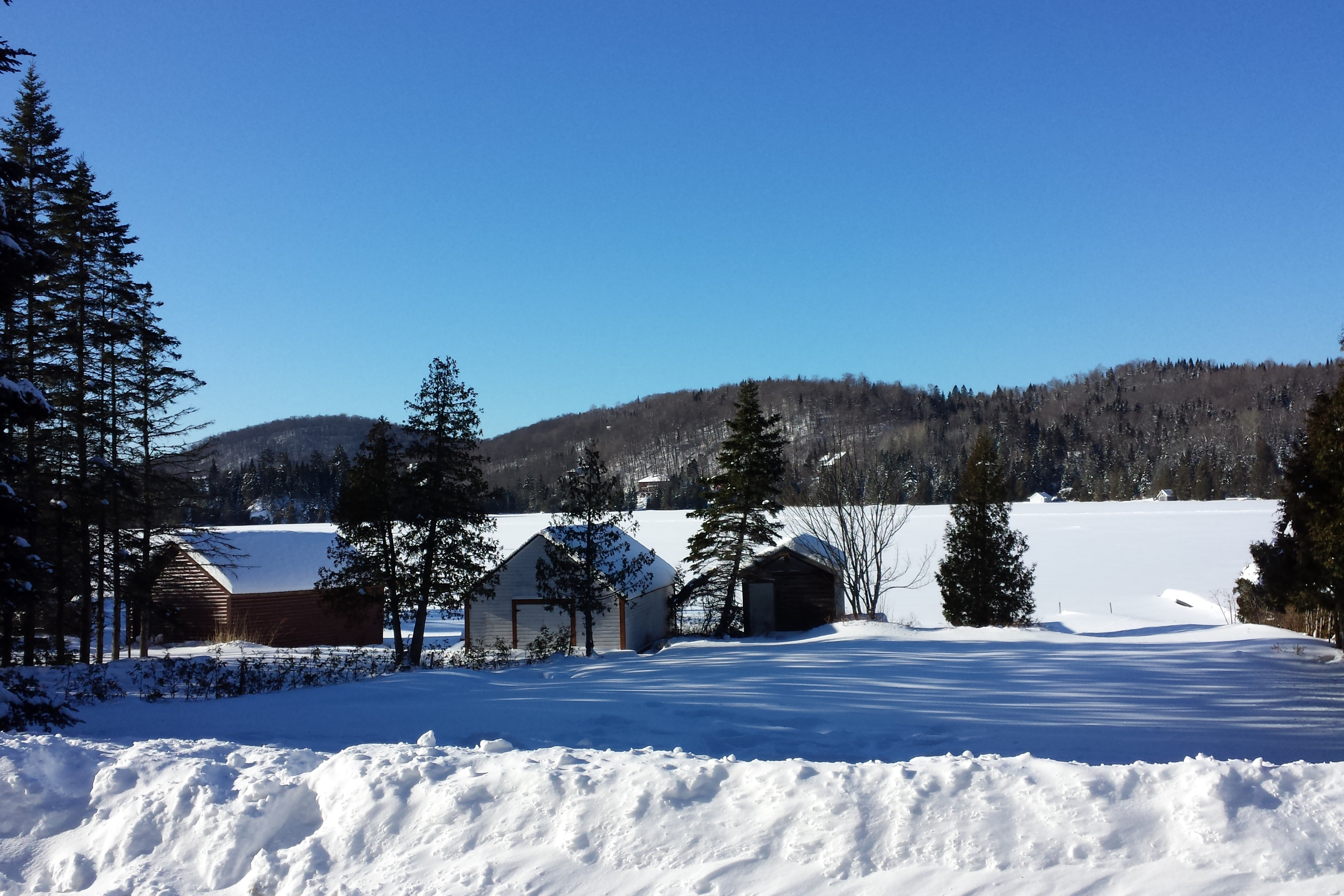
Lac Manitou

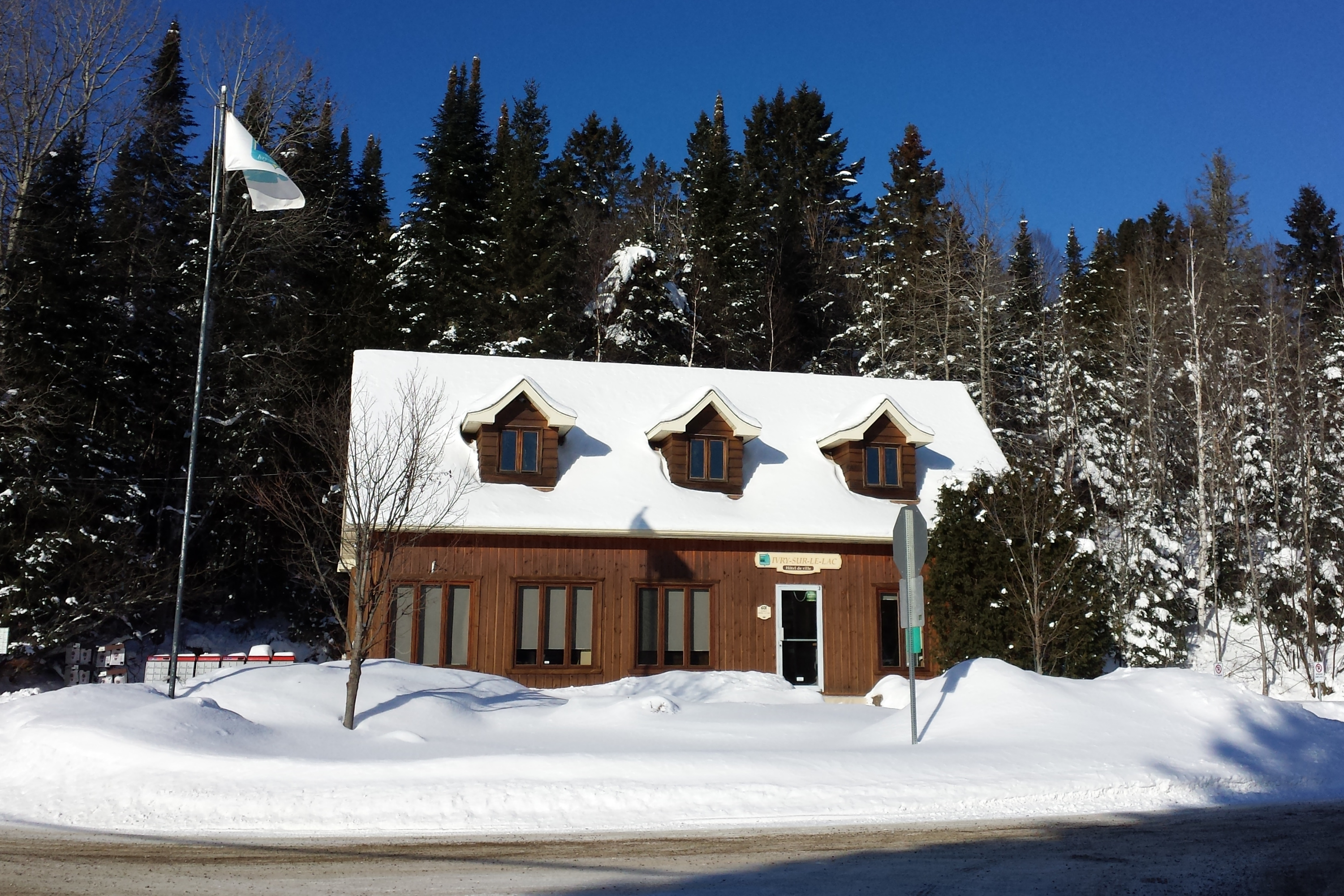
Town hall

== Education ==
Sainte-Agathe Academy of the Sir Wilfrid Laurier School Board, located in Sainte-Agathe-des-Monts, provides English-language public education for residents of Ivry-sur-le-Lac at both the elementary and secondary levels. The school follows the Quebec Education Program and offers instruction from pre-kindergarten through Secondary V.

French-language public education in Ivry-sur-le-Lac is provided by the Centre de services scolaire des Laurentides (CSSL), a French-language school service centre headquartered in Sainte-Agathe-des-Monts. The CSSL administers educational services across 32 municipalities and one territory, with Ivry-sur-le-Lac falling within its central sector (secteur centre), and provides schooling from the preschool through secondary levels as well as adult and vocational education.

== See also ==
- List of anglophone communities in Quebec
