= NYCC =

NYCC may refer to:

- National Young Composers Challenge
- New York Chiropractic College
- New York City Center
- New York City Council
- New York Comic Con
- New York Communities for Change
- North Yorkshire County Council
- New York Cycle Club, a recreational bicycle club
- N.Y.C.C., a former Eurodance project who charted with a cover of "(You Gotta) Fight for Your Right (To Party!)"
