= Brébeuf, Quebec =

Brébeuf
- Municipality
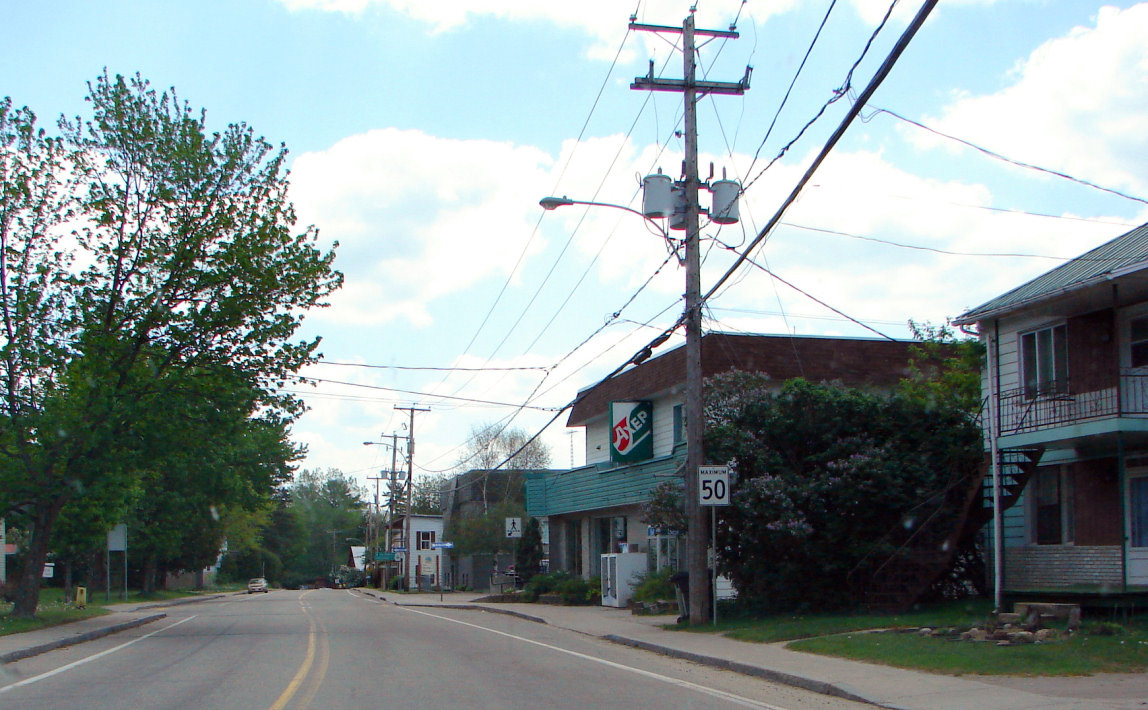
- Road 323 in Brébeuf

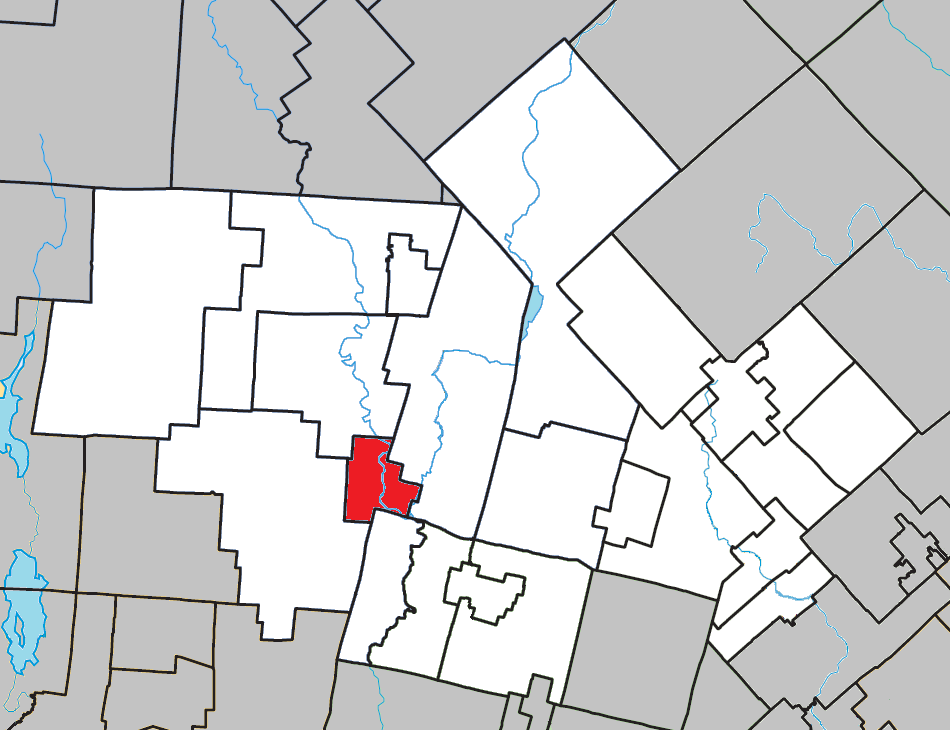
- Location within Les Laurentides RCM.

- Location in central Quebec.
- Coordinates: 46°04′N 74°40′W
- Country: Canada
- Province: Quebec
- Region: Laurentides
- RCM: Les Laurentides
- Constituted: June 4, 1910
- Named for: Jean de Brébeuf

Government
  - Mayor: Ronald Provost
  - Federal riding: Laurentides—Labelle
  - Prov. riding: Labelle

Area
  - Total: 37.60 km^{2} (14.52 sq mi)
  - Land: 35.78 km^{2} (13.81 sq mi)

Population (2021)
  - Total: 1,009
  - Density: 28.2/km^{2} (73/sq mi)
  - Pop 2016-2021: ▲3.4%
  - Dwellings: 620
- Time zone: UTC−5 (EST)
  - Summer (DST): UTC−4 (EDT)
- Postal code(s): J0T 1B0
- Area code: 819
- Highways: R-323
- Website: www.brebeuf.ca

Brébeuf (French pronunciation: [bʁebœf]) is a municipality in the Laurentides region of Quebec, Canada, part of Les Laurentides Regional County Municipality. It is located along the Rouge River (Rivière Rouge), near Mont-Tremblant.

== Demographics ==
In the 2021 Census of Population conducted by Statistics Canada, Brébeuf had a population of 1,009 living in 495 of its 620 total private dwellings, a change of 3.4% from its 2016 population of 976. With a land area of 35.78 km^{2} (13.81 sq mi), it had a population density of 28.2/km^{2} (73.0/sq mi) in 2021.

Population:

- Population in 2021: 1,009 (2016 to 2021 population change: 3.4%)
- Population in 2016: 976
- Population in 2011: 1,012
- Population in 2006: 939
- Population in 2001: 800
- Population in 1996: 695
- Population in 1991: 609
- Population in 1986: 611
- Population in 1981: 538
- Population in 1976: 426
- Population in 1971: 374
- Population in 1966: 380
- Population in 1961: 410
- Population in 1956: 417
- Population in 1951: 469
- Population in 1941: 384
- Population in 1931: 308
- Population in 1921: 340
- Population in 1911: 325

Mother tongue:

- English as first language: 3%
- French as first language: 95%
- English and French as first language: 1.5%
- Other as first language: 1%
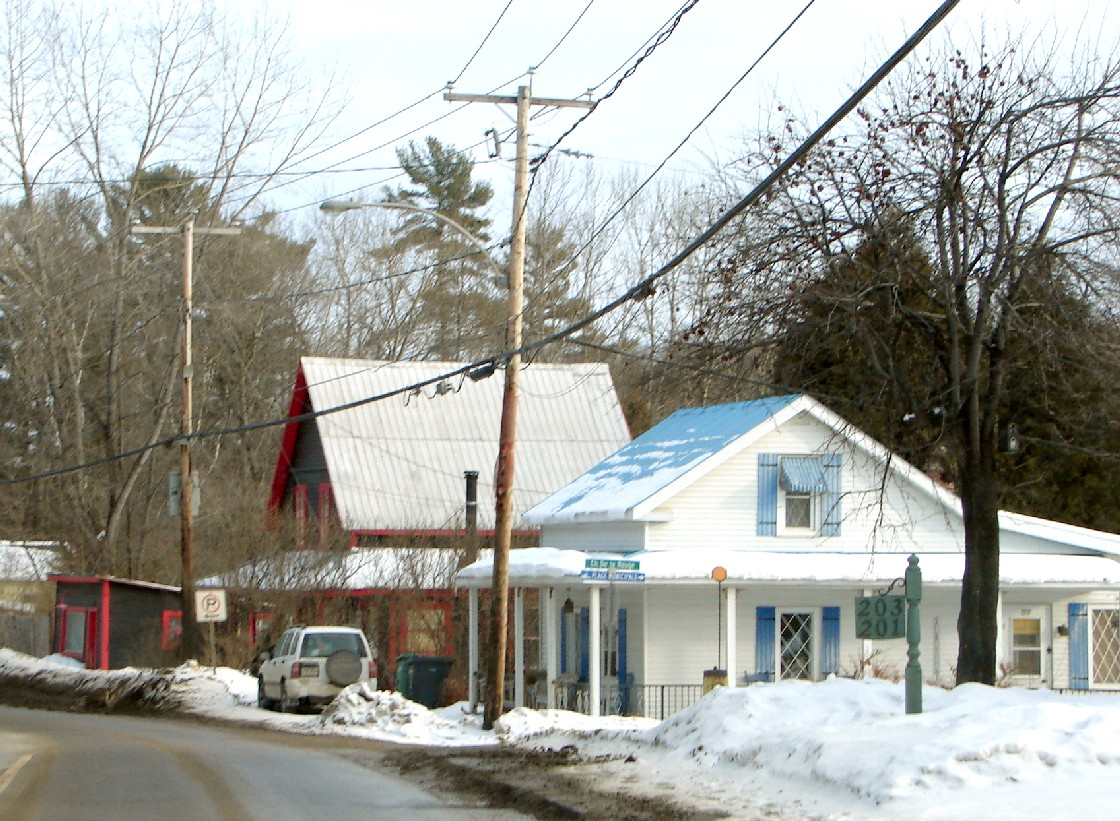

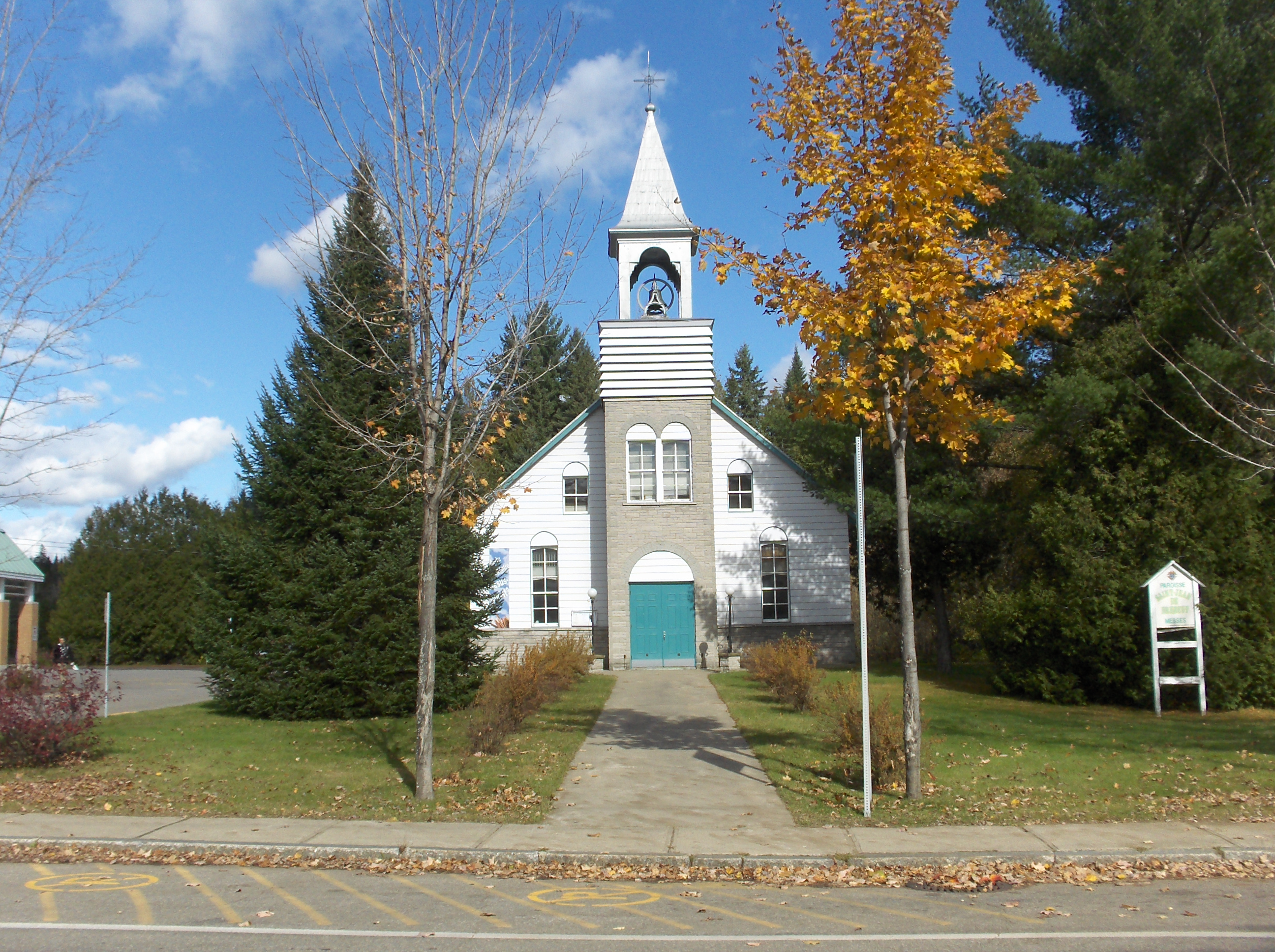

== Education ==
Sir Wilfrid Laurier School Board operates English-language schools:

- Arundel Elementary School in Arundel
- Sainte Agathe Academy (for high school only) in Sainte-Agathe-des-Monts
