= Sainte Agathe Academy =

Coordinates: 46.0525°N 74.2919°W

Sainte Agathe Academy (SAA; French: Académie Sainte Agathe) is a public anglophone primary and secondary school in Sainte-Agathe-des-Monts, Quebec. It is operated by the Sir Wilfrid Laurier School Board.

Persons from the following communities are zoned to this school for the elementary level: Sainte-Agathe-des-Monts, Doncaster, Ivry-sur-le-Lac, L'Ascension, La Conception, La Macaza, La Minerve, Labelle, Lac-Supérieur, Lantier, Mont-Blanc, Mont-Tremblant, Rivière-Rouge, Saint-Donat, Sainte-Agathe-des-Monts, Sainte-Lucie-des-Laurentides, Val-David, Val-des-Lacs, and Val-Morin, as well as the northern half of Saint-Adolphe-d'Howard. All areas zoned for the elementary level are also zoned for the secondary level. In addition, students from other areas are assigned to secondary classes here; they include: Amherst, Arundel, Barkmere, Brébeuf, and Huberdeau.
