= Les Laurentides Regional County Municipality =

Les Laurentides
- Regional county municipality
- Location in province of Quebec
- Coordinates: 46°07′N 74°36′W
- Country: Canada
- Province: Quebec
- Region: Laurentides
- Effective: January 1, 1983
- County seat: Mont-Blanc

Government
  - Type: Prefecture
  - Prefect: Marc L’Heureux

Area
  - Total: 2,599.70 km^{2} (1,003.75 sq mi)
  - Land: 2,457.53 km^{2} (948.86 sq mi)

Population (2021)
  - Total: 50,777
  - Density: 20.7/km^{2} (54/sq mi)
  - Change 2016-2021: ▲10.6%
  - Dwellings: 37,057
- Time zone: UTC−5 (EST)
  - Summer (DST): UTC−4 (EDT)
- Area code: 819
- Website: www.mrclaurentides.qc.ca

Les Laurentides (French pronunciation: [le lɔʁɑ̃tid], The Laurentians) is a regional county municipality in the Laurentides region of Quebec, Canada. The seat is in Mont-Blanc. It is named after the Laurentian Mountains.

The population was 50,777 according to the 2021 Canadian Census.

== Subdivisions ==
There are 20 subdivisions within the RCM:

Cities & towns (3)

- Barkmere
- Mont-Tremblant
- Sainte-Agathe-des-Monts

Municipalities (14)

- Brébeuf
- Huberdeau
- Ivry-sur-le-Lac
- Labelle
- La Conception
- Lac-Supérieur
- Lac-Tremblant-Nord
- La Minerve
- Lantier
- Mont-Blanc
- Montcalm
- Sainte-Lucie-des-Laurentides
- Val-des-Lacs
- Val-Morin

Townships (2)

- Amherst
- Arundel

Villages (1)

- Val-David

Indian reserves (1)
(not associated with RCM)

- Doncaster

== Transportation ==
=== Access routes ===
Highways and numbered routes that run through the municipality, including external routes that start or finish at the county border:

- Autoroutes
  - A-15 (TCH)
- Principal highways
  - R-117 (TCH)
- Secondary highways
  - R-323
  - R-327
  - R-329
  - R-364
- External routes
  - None

== See also ==
- List of regional county municipalities and equivalent territories in Quebec
