= Sainte-Lucie-des-Laurentides =

- Municipality
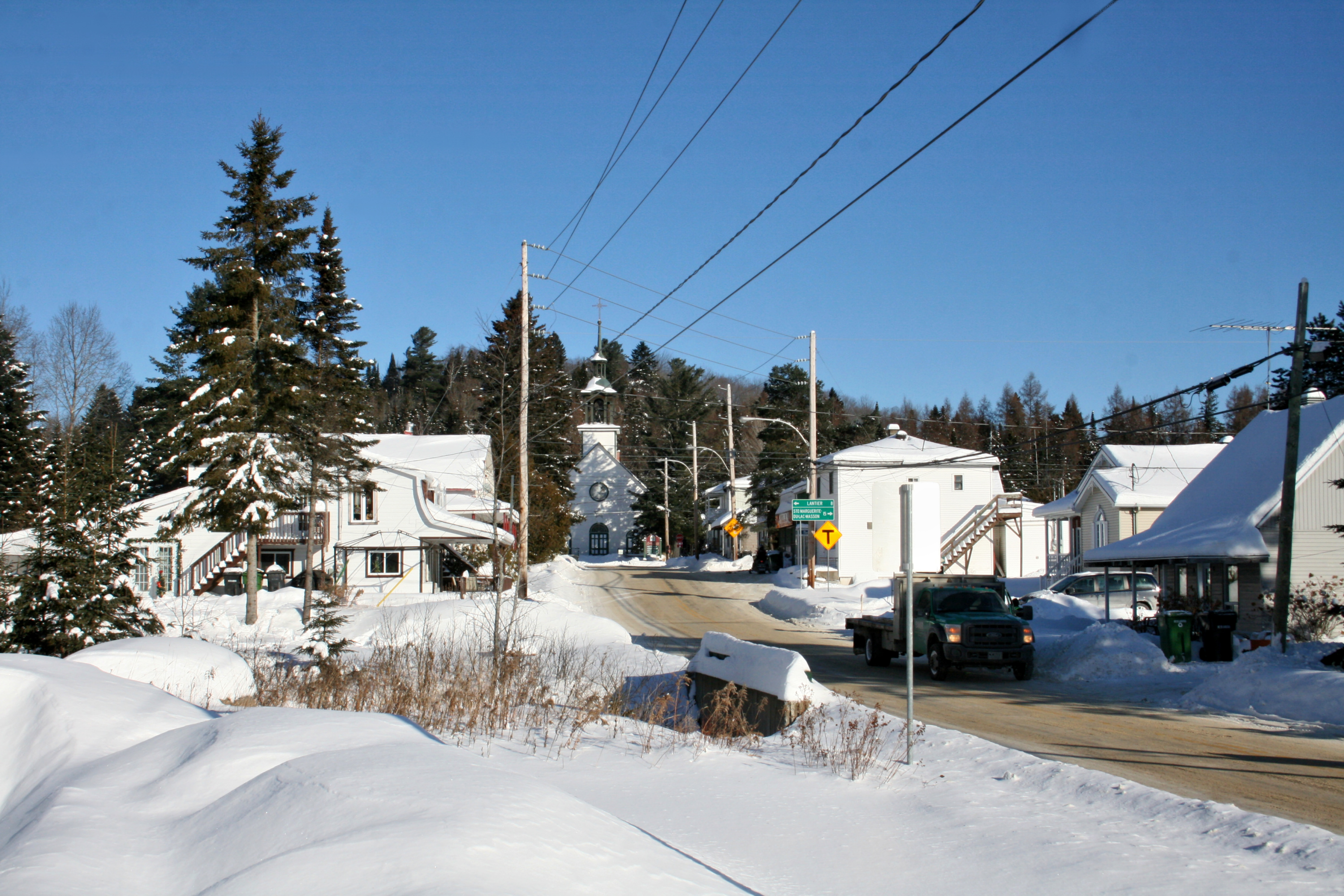

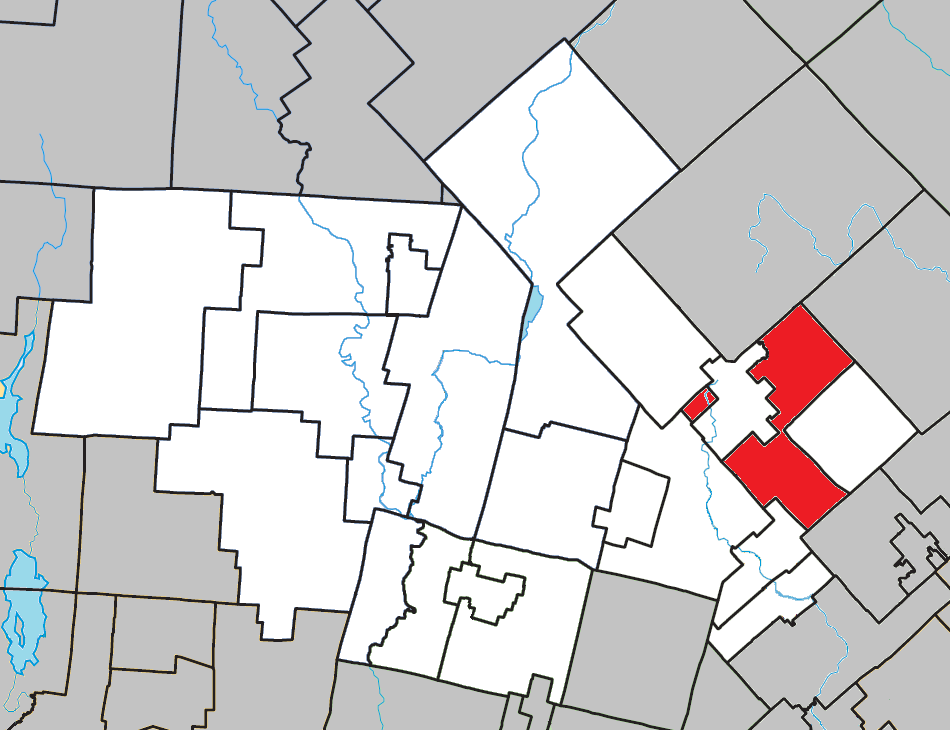
- Location within Les Laurentides RCM

- Location in central Quebec
- Coordinates: 46°08′N 74°11′W
- Country: Canada
- Province: Quebec
- Region: Laurentides
- RCM: Les Laurentides
- Constituted: January 1, 1874

Government
  - Mayor: Sylvain Loranger
  - Fed. riding: Laurentides—Labelle
  - Prov. riding: Bertrand

Area
  - Total: 111.41 km^{2} (43.02 sq mi)
  - Land: 108.98 km^{2} (42.08 sq mi)

Population (2021)
  - Total: 1,445
  - Density: 13.3/km^{2} (34/sq mi)
  - Change 2016-21: ▲15.0%
  - Dwellings: 953
- Time zone: UTC−5 (EST)
  - Summer (DST): UTC−4 (EDT)
- Postal code(s): J0T 2J0
- Area code(s): 819
- Highways: No major routes
- Website: msldl.ca

Sainte-Lucie-des-Laurentides (French pronunciation: [sɛ̃t lysi de lɔʁɑ̃tid]) is a municipality in the Laurentides region of Quebec, Canada, part of the Les Laurentides Regional County Municipality.

== History ==
In 1858, the geographic Township of Doncaster was proclaimed, named after the city in South Yorkshire, England. It is believed that the township municipality was established in 1874, although there are no official documents to confirm this. In 1878, the local parish was founded, named Sainte-Lucie-de-Doncaster after Saint Lucy. The following year, its post office opened.

In 1948, it lost part of its territory when the Municipality of Lantier was created.

On December 30, 1961, the Township Municipality of Doncaster changed its statutes and name to become the Municipality of Sainte-Lucie. It was renamed again on September 13, 1975, to Sainte-Lucie-des-Laurentides to reflect its location in the Laurentians.

== Geography ==
Mount Kaaikop, a 838 metres (2,749 ft) high barren and rocky mountain, is located in the territory of the municipality.

=== Hydrography ===
From its source, Lake Dufresne, the River Dufresne flows eastwards through the municipality. Lake Vaillancourt, the source of the River Doncaster, which flows from north to south, is situated on the south-eastern boundary of the municipality.

== Demographics ==
Historical census populations – Sainte-Lucie-des-Laurentides

Year	Pop.	±%
1881	876	—
1891	694	−20.8%
1901	874	+25.9%
1911	908	+3.9%
1921	780	−14.1%
1931	726	−6.9%
1941	784	+8.0%
1951	434	−44.6%

Year	Pop.	±%
1956	390	−10.1%
1961	381	−2.3%
1966	409	+7.3%
1971	409	+0.0%
1976	500	+22.2%
1981	716	+43.2%
1986	750	+4.7%
1991	891	+18.8%

Year	Pop.	±%
1996	999	+12.1%
2001	923	−7.6%
2006	1,138	+23.3%
2011	1,269	+11.5%
2016	1,256	−1.0%
2021	1,445	+15.0%

Population counts are not adjusted for boundary changes.
Source: Statistics Canada

Private dwellings occupied by usual residents (2021): 688 (total dwellings: 953)

Mother tongue (2021):

- English as first language: 3.2%
- French as first language: 93.3%
- English and French as first languages: 1.4%
- Other as first language: 1.8%

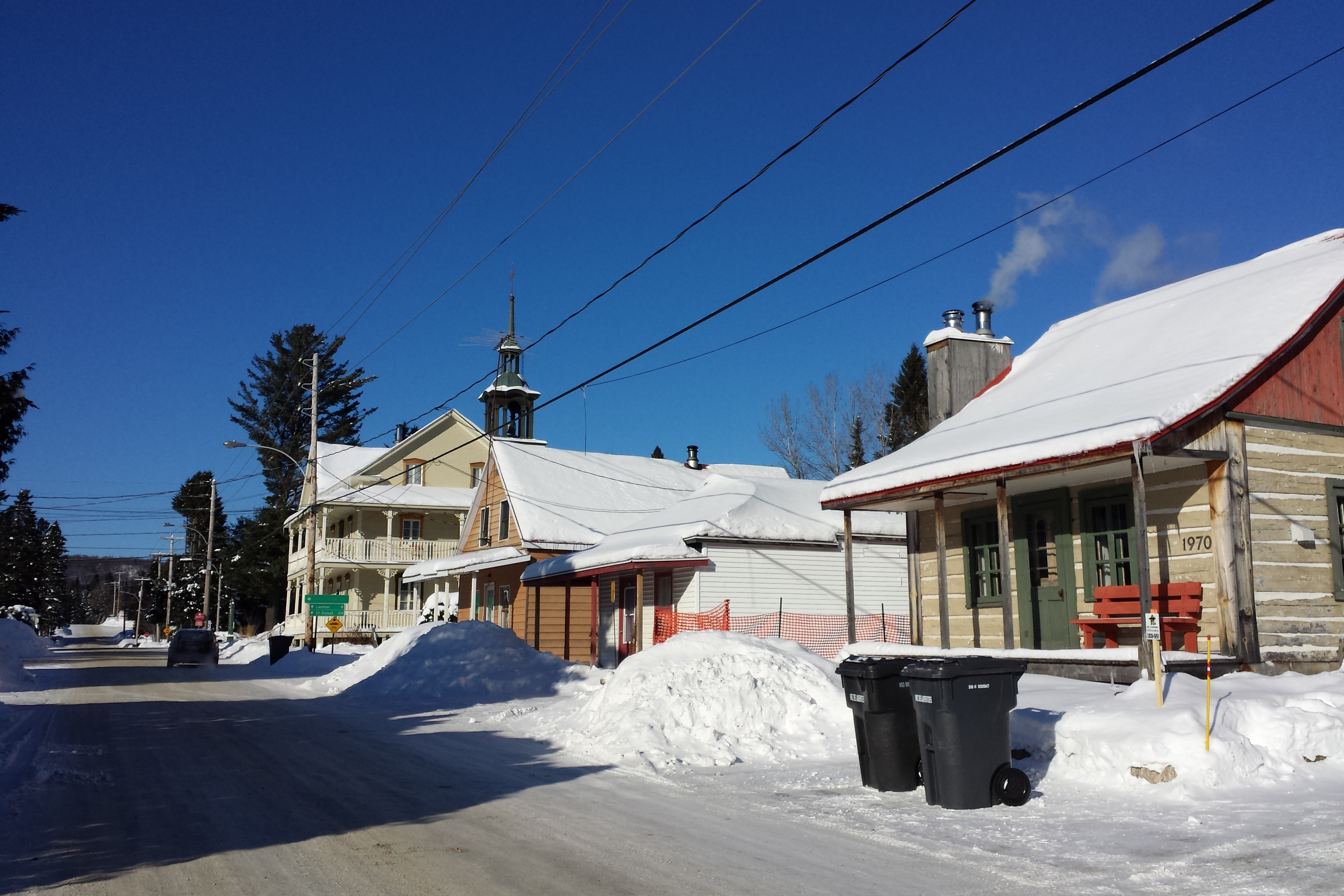
Chemin de Hauteurs

== Economy ==
Sainte-Lucie-des-Laurentides has an economy characteristic of small Quebec rural municipalities, with activities shaped by its natural environment and recently growing residential community.

== Government ==
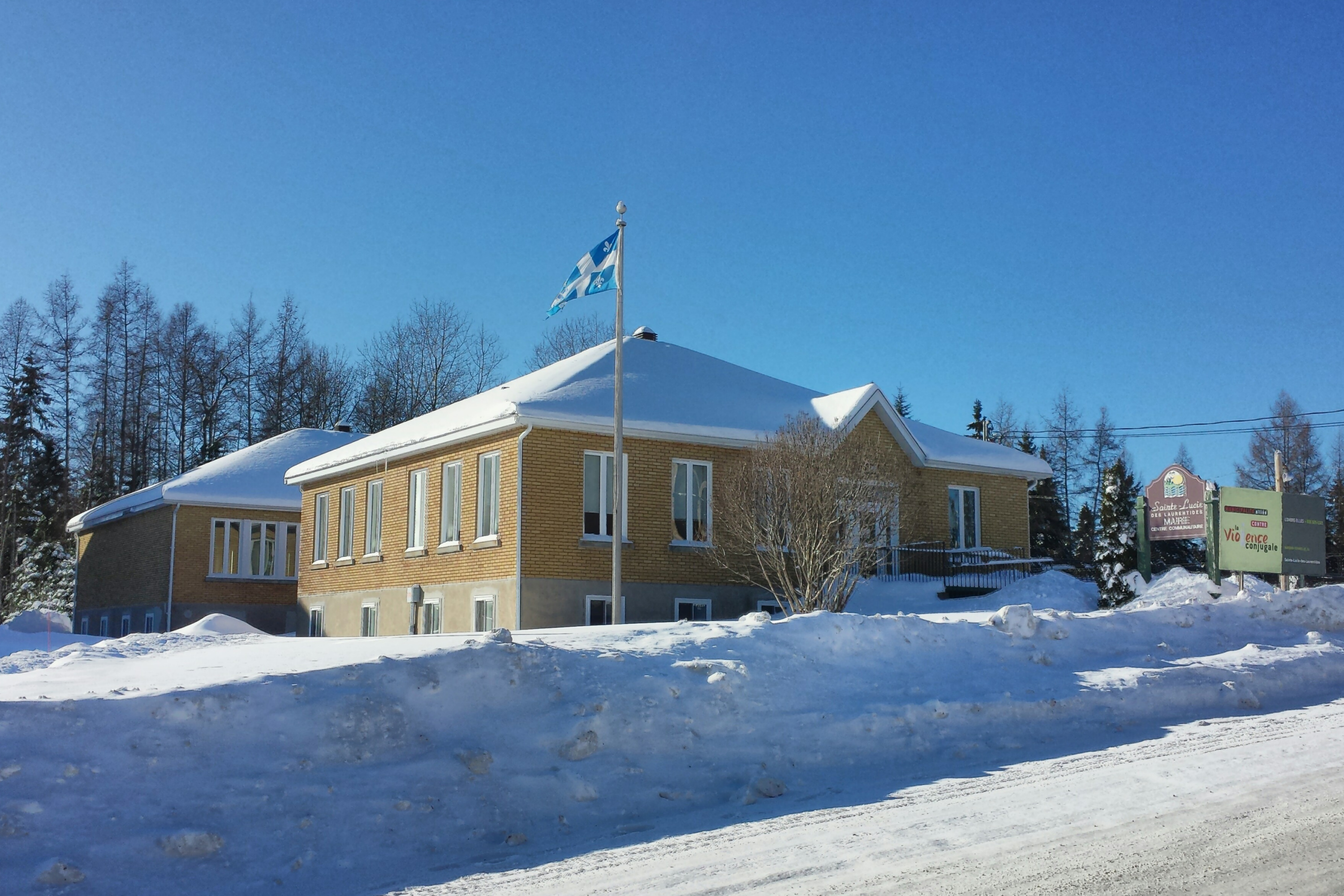
Town hall

List of former mayors:

- Denis Deslauriers (...–2005)
- Ghislain Shoeb (2005–2013)
- Serge Chénier (2013–2017)
- Anne Guylaine Legault (2017–2021)
- Francis Corbeil (2021–2023)
- Luc Grenon (2023–2025)
- Sylvain Loranger (2025–present)

== Education ==
Sainte Agathe Academy (of the Sir Wilfrid Laurier School Board) in Sainte-Agathe-des-Monts serves English-speaking students in this community for both elementary and secondary levels.
