= Y Country Camp =

Location
- 130 Chemin du Lac Blanc; Huberdeau, Quebec, JOT 1G0
- Coordinates: 46.03458°N 74.65592°W

Information
- Former name: YM-YWHA Country Camp
- Type: Jewish summer camp
- Religious affiliation: Judaism
- Established: 1962; 64 years ago
- Director: Marni Schlomowitz
- Gender: Co-educational
- Age range: 7-17
- Website: ycountrycamp.com

The Harry Bronfman Y Country Camp (YCC), formerly known as the YM-YWHA Country Camp, is a Jewish summer camp in Huberdeau, Quebec. It affiliated with the Sylvan Adams YM-YWHA in Montreal.

== History ==
The YM-YWHA Country Camp was founded in 1962 with a capital fund campaign led by Joe Rubin, with Saidye and Samuel Bronfman as "honorary patrons." It began operating in June 1963, social worker Bernard Scotch serving as its first director. The camp hosted 545 children in its first year of operation, and some 800 by 1965.

In 1977, YCC merged with Camp Wooden Acres due to low registration at the former. Plans to open a senior citizen's section were cancelled to accommodate the new campers.
