= La Minerve, Quebec =

La Minerve
- Municipality
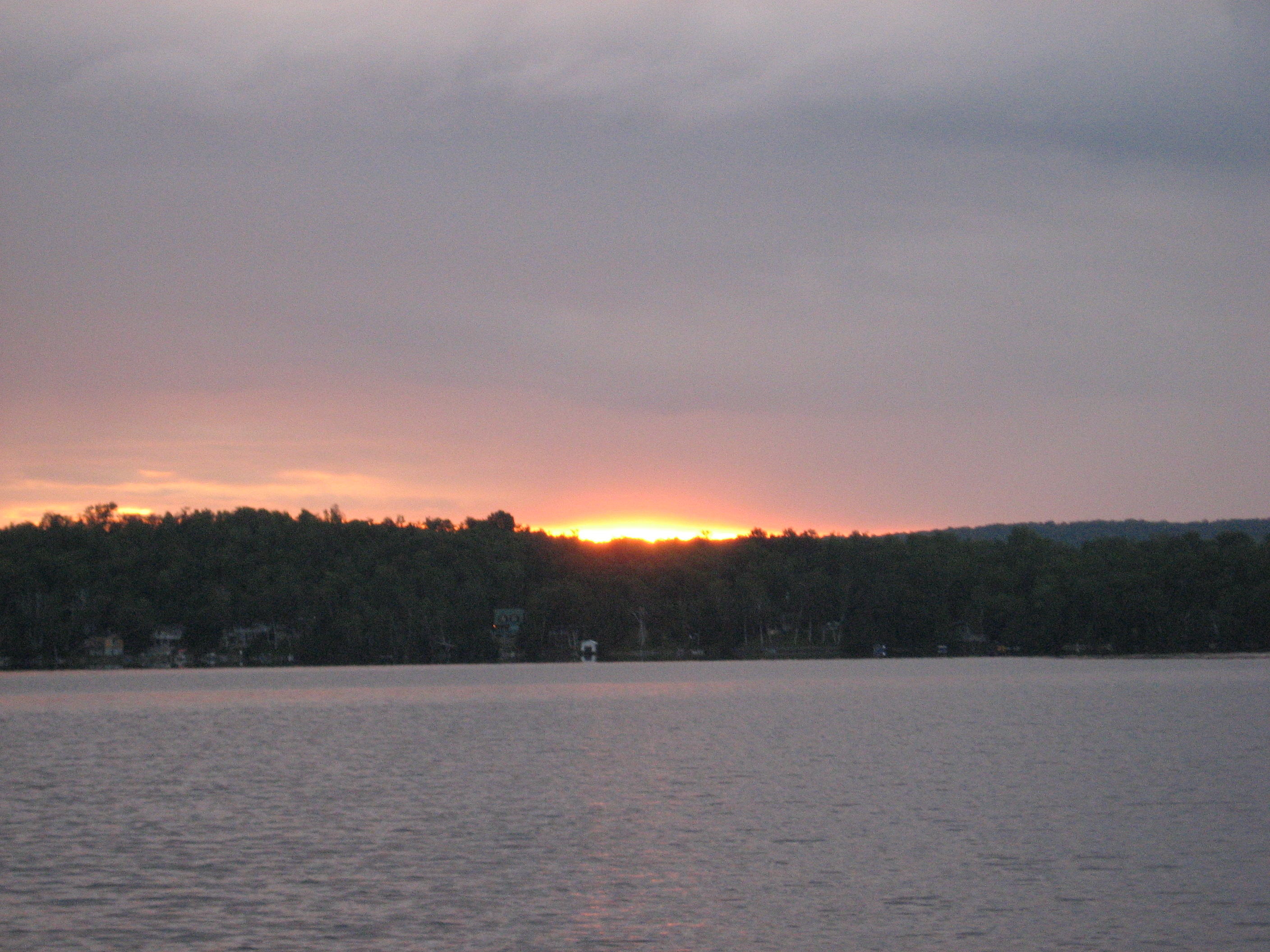
- Lake Marie-Louise in La Minerve

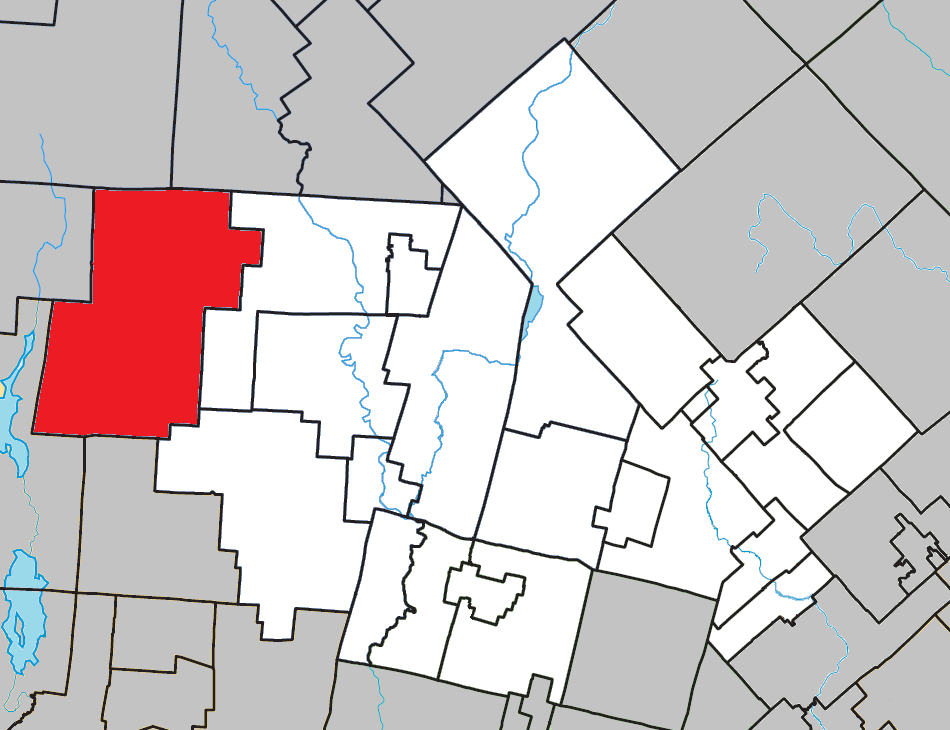
- Location within Les Laurentides RCM

- Location in central Quebec
- Coordinates: 46°15′N 74°56′W
- Country: Canada
- Province: Quebec
- Region: Laurentides
- RCM: Les Laurentides
- Settled: 1885
- Constituted: December 30, 1892

Government
  - Mayor: Johnny Salera
  - Federal riding: Laurentides—Labelle
  - Prov. riding: Labelle

Area
  - Total: 328.10 km^{2} (126.68 sq mi)
  - Land: 274.92 km^{2} (106.15 sq mi)

Population (2021)
  - Total: 1,421
  - Density: 5.2/km^{2} (13/sq mi)
  - Pop (2016-21): ▲17.9%
  - Dwellings: 1,638
- Time zone: UTC−5 (EST)
  - Summer (DST): UTC−4 (EDT)
- Postal code(s): J0T 1S0
- Area code: 819
- Highways: No major routes
- Website: www.municipalite. laminerve.qc.ca

La Minerve (French pronunciation: [la minɛʁv]) is a village and municipality in the Laurentides region of Quebec, Canada, part of the Les Laurentides Regional County Municipality.

Located in the Laurentian Mountains, La Minerve is still fairly forested and covered with many lakes, notably Chapleau, Désert, and La Minerve Lakes. Its southern portion is part of the Papineau-Labelle Wildlife Reserve. The area is popular for cottage vacationing. In the summer, the small local population swells with nearly 15,000 tourists.

== History ==
Before the arrival of missionary colonizer Antoine Labelle, journalists of the Montreal newspaper "La Minerve" explored this region between 1880 and 1885. At that time, the Club Island was known as "Governor Island" and belonged to Sir Joseph-Adolphe Chapleau, controller of the newspaper. Afterwards, employees of La Minerve began to strongly encourage the settlement of the area which came to be named after this newspaper. The 30 January 1886 edition of La Minerve reported:

"From Iroquois Chute, you can go on a good road to Minerva Township, where there are several inhabitants and where the chapel, the sawmill needs to be built soon. The site of the village is wonderful. At two miles away, opposite Lake Desert, is Chapleau Lake, one of the most beautiful lakes in this region. There is a beautiful island of 3200 acres of land, fertile and well wooded, which belongs to the Honorable Secretary of State. There is enough to make a princely mansion and enjoy in summer all the benefits of country life and the most beautiful lakes."

During the years 1880 to 1890, the government granted the first land concessions. The first settler, Isaac Grégoire, arrived in 1885, and in the fall of the same year, notary Joseph Lefebvre, from Waterloo in the Eastern Townships, and some of his friends came to the area taking possession of some lots in La Minerve. Lefebvre opened a flour mill and a sawmill on the shores of Lake Desert.

In 1892, the Township of La Minerve and its township municipality were formed. In 1896, the post office opened, named Minerve (but renamed to La Minerve in 1949). In 1897, there were 331 acres (1.34 km^{2}) under cultivation, 13 houses, 4 barns, 40 arpents of fencing (about 2.34 km). Twenty years later in 1917, there were 125 families with a total of 677 inhabitants.

On January 1, 1995, La Minerve absorbed the unorganized territories of Lac-Marie-Le Franc and Lac-aux-Castors located in the Labelle and Gagnon townships, but subsequently lost about 20 square kilometres (7.7 sq mi) to the Municipality of Labelle. In 1998, the Township Municipality of La Minerve obtained a new legal status and became the Municipality of La Minerve.

== Demographics ==
=== Population ===
Canada census – La Minerve community profile

	2021	2016	2011
Population	1,421 (+17.9% from 2016)	1,205 (-2.4% from 2011)	1,234 (-4.7% from 2006)
Land area	274.92 km^{2} (106.15 sq mi)	278.49 km^{2} (107.53 sq mi)	278.01 km^{2} (107.34 sq mi)
Population density	5.2/km^{2} (13/sq mi)	4.3/km^{2} (11/sq mi)	4.4/km^{2} (11/sq mi)
Median age	62.0 (M: 62.4, F: 62.0)	60.9 (M: 61.8, F: 59.8)	57.7 (M: 57.9, F: 57.6)
Private dwellings	1,638 (total) 767 (occupied)	1,674 (total)	1,586 (total)
Median household income	$57,600	$51,021	$45,601

References: 2021 2016 2011

Historical Census Data - La Minerve, Quebec

Year	Pop.	±%
1901	307	—
1911	463	+50.8%
1921	684	+47.7%
1932	578	−15.5%
1941	722	+24.9%
1951	813	+12.6%
1956	813	+0.0%

Year	Pop.	±%
1961	808	−0.6%
1966	762	−5.7%
1971	751	−1.4%
1976	686	−8.7%
1981	734	+7.0%
1986	736	+0.3%
1991	880	+19.6%

Year	Pop.	±%
1996	927	+5.3%
2001	1,080	+16.5%
2006	1,295	+19.9%
2011	1,234	−4.7%
2016	1,205	−2.4%
2021	1,421	+17.9%

Source: Statistics Canada

Mother tongue (2021):

- English as first language: 5.3%
- French as first language: 91.2%
- English and French as first language: 1.4%
- Other as first language: 1.4%

== Education ==
Sainte Agathe Academy (of the Sir Wilfrid Laurier School Board) in Sainte-Agathe-des-Monts serves English-speaking students in this community for both elementary and secondary levels.
