= Val-Morin =

- Municipality
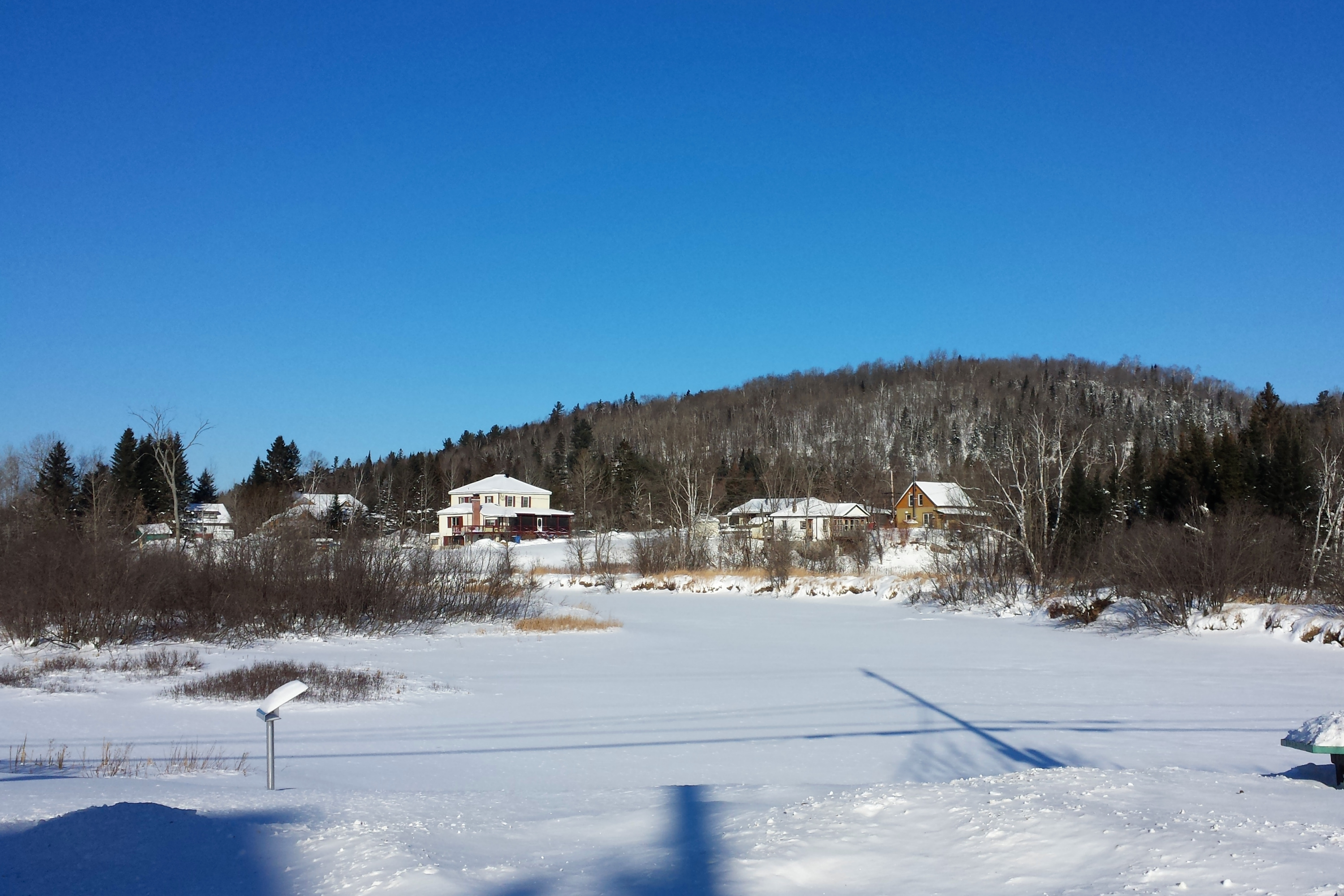

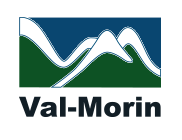
- Seal

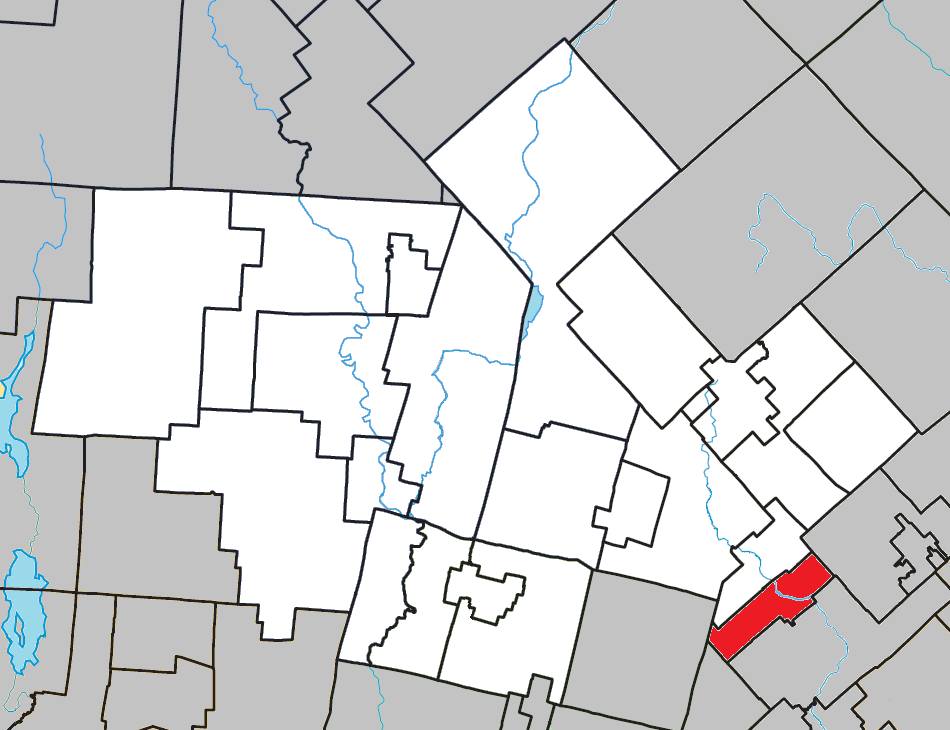
- Location within Les Laurentides RCM

- Location in central Quebec Val-Morin (Canada)
- Coordinates: 46°00′N 74°11′W
- Country: Canada
- Province: Quebec
- Region: Laurentides
- RCM: Les Laurentides
- Settled: 1850s
- Constituted: June 27, 1922

Government
  - Mayor: Pierre Asselin
  - Fed. riding: Laurentides—Labelle
  - Prov. riding: Bertrand

Area
  - Total: 41.39 km^{2} (15.98 sq mi)
  - Land: 39.20 km^{2} (15.14 sq mi)
- Elevation: 309 m (1,014 ft)

Population (2021)
  - Total: 3,123
  - Density: 79.7/km^{2} (206/sq mi)
  - Change 2016-21: ▲8.8%
  - Dwellings: 2,077
- Time zone: UTC−5 (EST)
  - Summer (DST): UTC−4 (EDT)
- Postal code(s): J0T 2R0
- Area code(s): 819
- Highways A-15 (TCH): R-117
- Website: www.val-morin.ca

Val-Morin (French pronunciation: [val mɔʁɛ̃]) is a municipality in the Laurentides region of Quebec, Canada, part of the Les Laurentides Regional County Municipality.

== History ==
The geographic area now called Val-Morin was likely inhabited by First Nations people either Montagnais-Naskapi, Algonkin or Cree prior to European settlement.

In 1852, the Morin Township was formed. It was named after its founder and 19th-century politician Augustin-Norbert Morin (1803-1865) who already had a huge farm of more than 3 square kilometres (1.2 sq mi) on the banks of the Rivière du Nord, built around 1850-1860 and included a home, saw mill, and flour mill. Morin was among the first residents and helped many settlers to settle here. In 1887, the Val-Morin Post Office opened, and in 1922, the Municipality of Val-Morin was established.

Originally farmers, residents of Val-Morin have turned to the development of Alpine ski resorts and outdoor activities in recent times.

== Geography ==
Val-Morin is located in the Laurentian Mountains, along the Rivière du Nord and on the shores of Lake Raymond at an elevation of 309 metres (1,014 ft), about 15 kilometres (9.3 mi) south-east of Sainte-Agathe-des-Monts. Its territory includes numerous lakes such as La Salle, Lavallée, Bélair in the east, and Beauvais, Normand, and Valiquette in the west.

=== Climate ===
Climate data for Val-Morin
| Month | Jan | Feb | Mar | Apr | May | Jun | Jul | Aug | Sep | Oct | Nov | Dec | Year |
|---|---|---|---|---|---|---|---|---|---|---|---|---|---|
| Record high °C (°F) | 10 (50) | 12.5 (54.5) | 18.5 (65.3) | 29.5 (85.1) | 33.3 (91.9) | 34 (93) | 35 (95) | 36.1 (97.0) | 33.5 (92.3) | 26.1 (79.0) | 19 (66) | 13 (55) | 36.1 (97.0) |
| Mean daily maximum °C (°F) | −7.1 (19.2) | −4.3 (24.3) | 1.3 (34.3) | 9.1 (48.4) | 17.2 (63.0) | 22.1 (71.8) | 24.3 (75.7) | 23.2 (73.8) | 18.1 (64.6) | 10.4 (50.7) | 3 (37) | −4 (25) | 9.4 (48.9) |
| Daily mean °C (°F) | −12.5 (9.5) | −10.4 (13.3) | −4.5 (23.9) | 3.7 (38.7) | 11.5 (52.7) | 16.6 (61.9) | 19 (66) | 17.9 (64.2) | 13.2 (55.8) | 6.2 (43.2) | −0.6 (30.9) | −8.6 (16.5) | 4.3 (39.7) |
| Mean daily minimum °C (°F) | −17.9 (−0.2) | −16.4 (2.5) | −10.4 (13.3) | −1.7 (28.9) | 5.6 (42.1) | 11.1 (52.0) | 13.6 (56.5) | 12.6 (54.7) | 8.2 (46.8) | 1.9 (35.4) | −4.2 (24.4) | −13.1 (8.4) | −0.9 (30.4) |
| Record low °C (°F) | −40 (−40) | −41.7 (−43.1) | −33.3 (−27.9) | −22.2 (−8.0) | −6.7 (19.9) | −0.6 (30.9) | 3.9 (39.0) | 1.1 (34.0) | −5 (23) | −9 (16) | −25.6 (−14.1) | −36.5 (−33.7) | −41.7 (−43.1) |
| Average precipitation mm (inches) | 90.3 (3.56) | 71.3 (2.81) | 79.7 (3.14) | 91.9 (3.62) | 98.9 (3.89) | 121.9 (4.80) | 105.9 (4.17) | 101 (4.0) | 109.6 (4.31) | 109.8 (4.32) | 108.6 (4.28) | 104 (4.1) | 1,192.9 (46.96) |
Source: Environment Canada based on the St. Hippolyte weather station

== Demographics ==
Historical census populations – Val-Morin

| Year | Pop. | ±% |
|---|---|---|
| 1931 | 398 | — |
| 1941 | 466 | +17.1% |
| 1951 | 688 | +47.6% |
| 1956 | 697 | +1.3% |
| 1961 | 752 | +7.9% |
| 1966 | 701 | −6.8% |
| 1971 | 899 | +28.2% |
| 1976 | 1,112 | +23.7% |
| 1981 | 1,302 | +17.1% |

| Year | Pop. | ±% |
|---|---|---|
| 1986 | 1,241 | −4.7% |
| 1991 | 1,366 | +10.1% |
| 1996 | 2,043 | +49.6% |
| 2001 | 2,216 | +8.5% |
| 2006 | 2,756 | +24.4% |
| 2011 | 2,772 | +0.6% |
| 2016 | 2,870 | +3.5% |
| 2021 | 3,123 | +8.8% |

Source: Statistics Canada

Private dwellings occupied by usual residents (2021): 1,487 (total dwellings: 2,077)

Mother tongue (2021):

- English as first language: 4.9%
- French as first language: 89.7%
- English and French as first languages: 2.0%
- Other as first language: 2.9%

== Economy ==
Val-Morin benefits from its close proximity to Montreal and the much traveled Highway 15. The "Le Petit Train du Nord" bike path and cross country ski trail and linear park cuts through Val-Morin bringing many cyclists and cross-country skiers through its territory. The Parc Dufresne regional park also attracts many hikers and cross-country skiers.

== Government ==
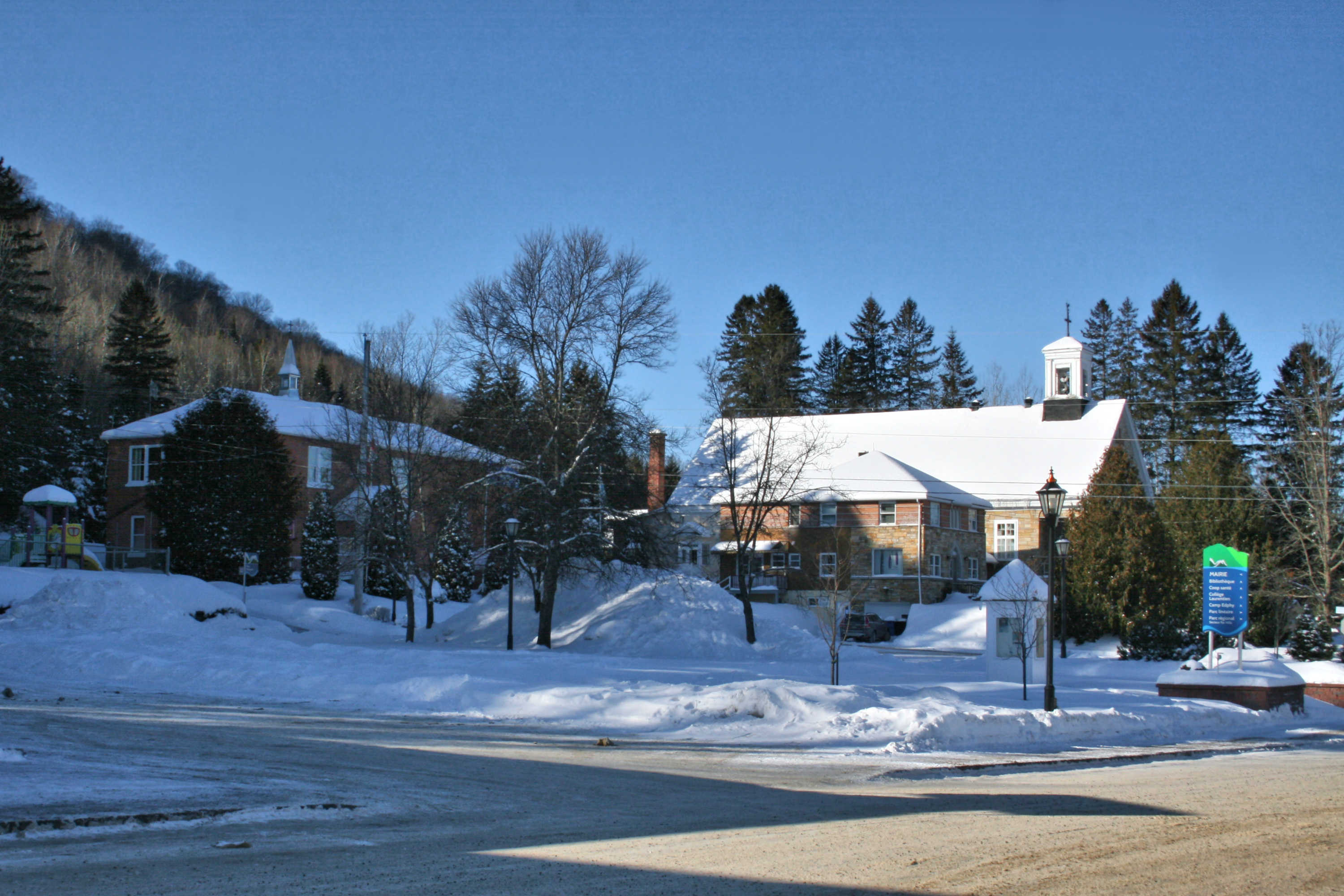
Val-Morin town centre, with a town hall on the left.

List of former mayors:

- Diane Demers (...–2005)
- Jacques Brien (2005–2011)
- Serge St-Hilaire (2011–2013)
- Guy Drouin (2013–2017)
- Benoît Perreault (2017–2020)
- Donna Salvati (2020–2025)
- Pierre Asselin (2025–present)

== Education ==
Sainte Agathe Academy (of the Sir Wilfrid Laurier School Board) in Sainte-Agathe-des-Monts serves English-speaking students in this community for both elementary and secondary levels.
