= Lantier, Quebec =

Lantier
- Municipality
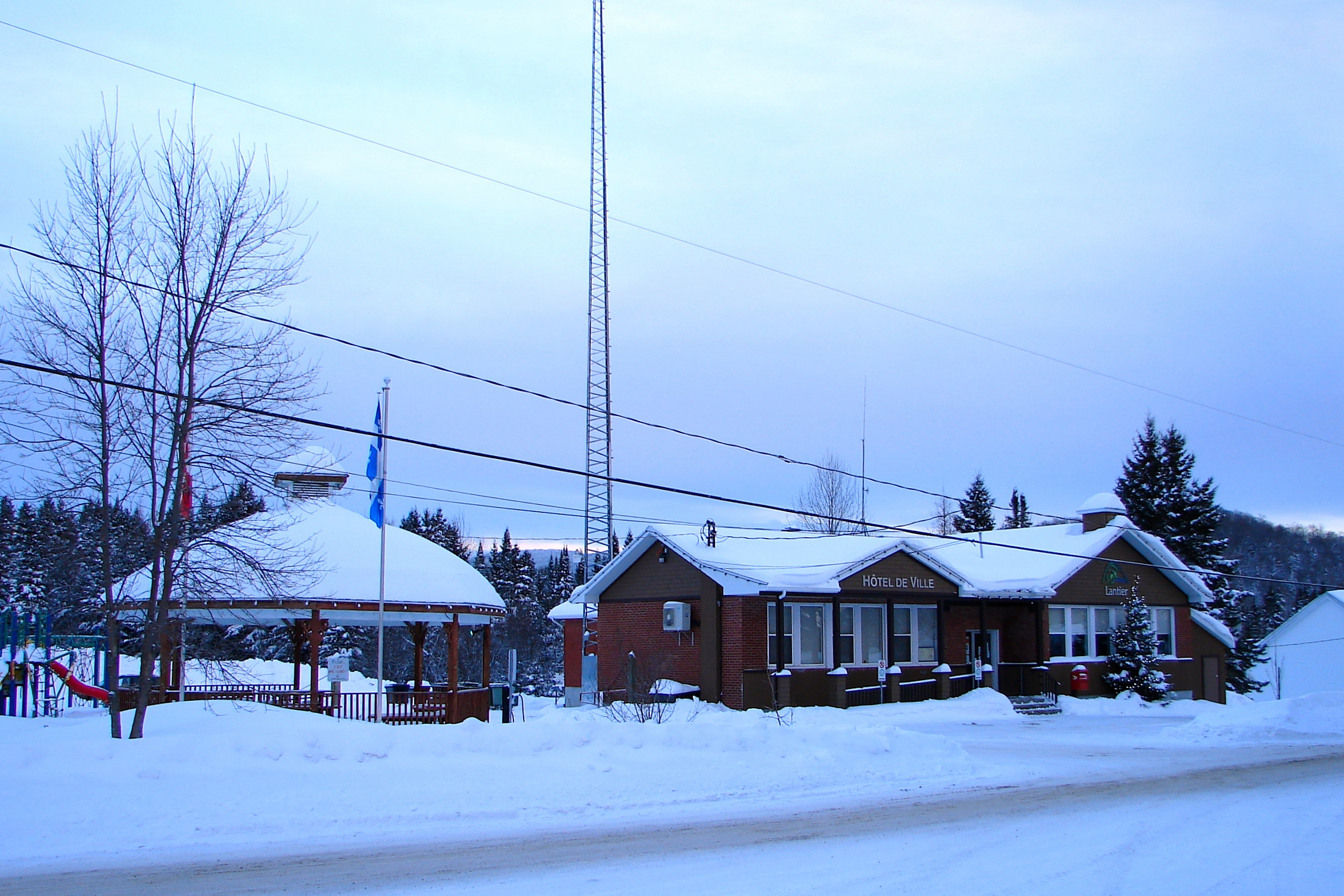
- Municipal hall
- Motto: En pleine nature (Surrounded by nature)
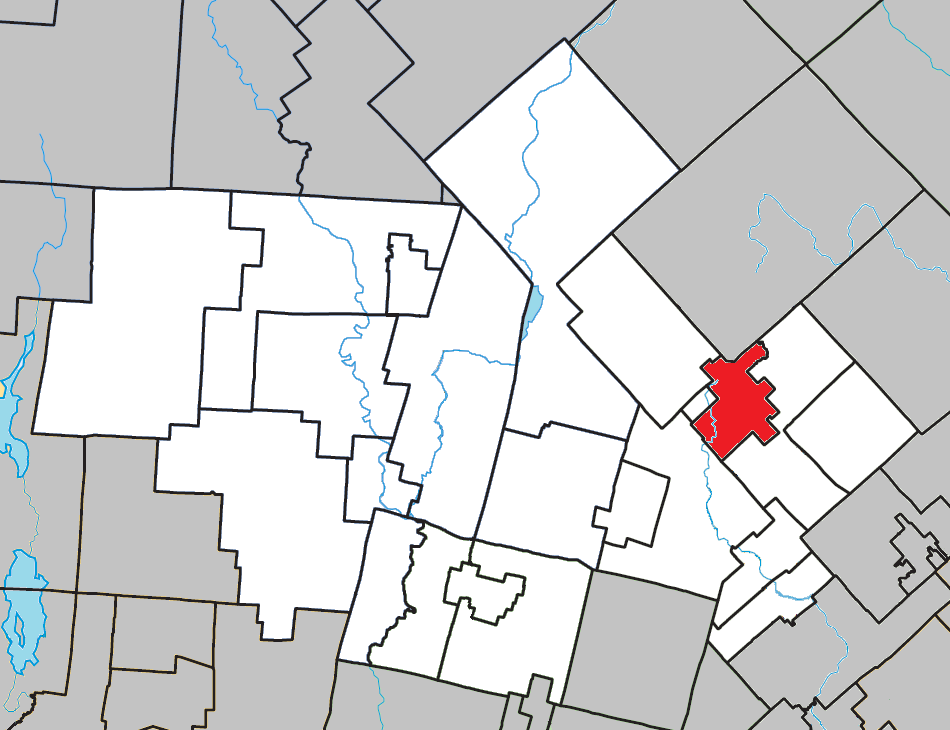
- Location within Les Laurentides RCM

- Location in central Quebec
- Coordinates: 46°09′N 74°15′W
- Country: Canada
- Province: Quebec
- Region: Laurentides
- RCM: Les Laurentides
- Constituted: January 1, 1948

Government
  - Mayor: Richard Forget
  - Fed. riding: Laurentides—Labelle
  - Prov. riding: Bertrand

Area
  - Total: 53.93 km^{2} (20.82 sq mi)
  - Land: 48.19 km^{2} (18.61 sq mi)

Population (2021)
  - Total: 891
  - Density: 18.5/km^{2} (48/sq mi)
  - Change 2016-21: ▲6.8%
  - Dwellings: 819
- Time zone: UTC−5 (EST)
  - Summer (DST): UTC−4 (EDT)
- Postal code(s): J0T 1V0
- Area code(s): 819
- Highways: R-329
- Website: lantier.quebec

Lantier (French: [lɑ̃tje], Canadian French: [lɑ̃tsje]) is a village and municipality in the Laurentides region of Quebec, Canada, part of the Les Laurentides Regional County Municipality.

== History ==
The municipality was formed in 1948 when it separated from the Township Municipality of Doncaster (now Sainte-Lucie-des-Laurentides). It was named after Ludger Lanthier, a former postmaster of Doncaster Township.

== Demographics ==
Historical census populations – Lantier, Quebec

Year	Pop.	±%
1951	397	—
1956	357	−10.1%
1961	418	+17.1%
1966	453	+8.4%
1971	434	−4.2%
1976	466	+7.4%
1981	508	+9.0%
1986	433	−14.8%

Year	Pop.	±%
1991	680	+57.0%
1996	631	−7.2%
2001	654	+3.6%
2006	825	+26.1%
2011	828	+0.4%
2016	834	+0.7%
2021	891	+6.8%

Source: Statistics Canada

Private dwellings occupied by usual residents (2021): 442 (total dwellings: 819)

Mother tongue (2021):

- English as first language: 11.2%
- French as first language: 84.8%
- English and French as first language: 1.7%
- Other as first language: 1.7%

== Government ==
Municipal council:

- Mayor: Richard Forget (mayor since 2009)
- Councillors: Line Beauregard, Jessica Cloutier, Marilyn Dagenais, Nathalie Dupont, Marie-Josée Leroux, Steve Martin

== Education ==
Sainte Agathe Academy (of the Sir Wilfrid Laurier School Board) in Sainte-Agathe-des-Monts serves English-speaking students in this community for both elementary and secondary levels.
