= Amherst, Quebec =

Amherst
- Township municipality
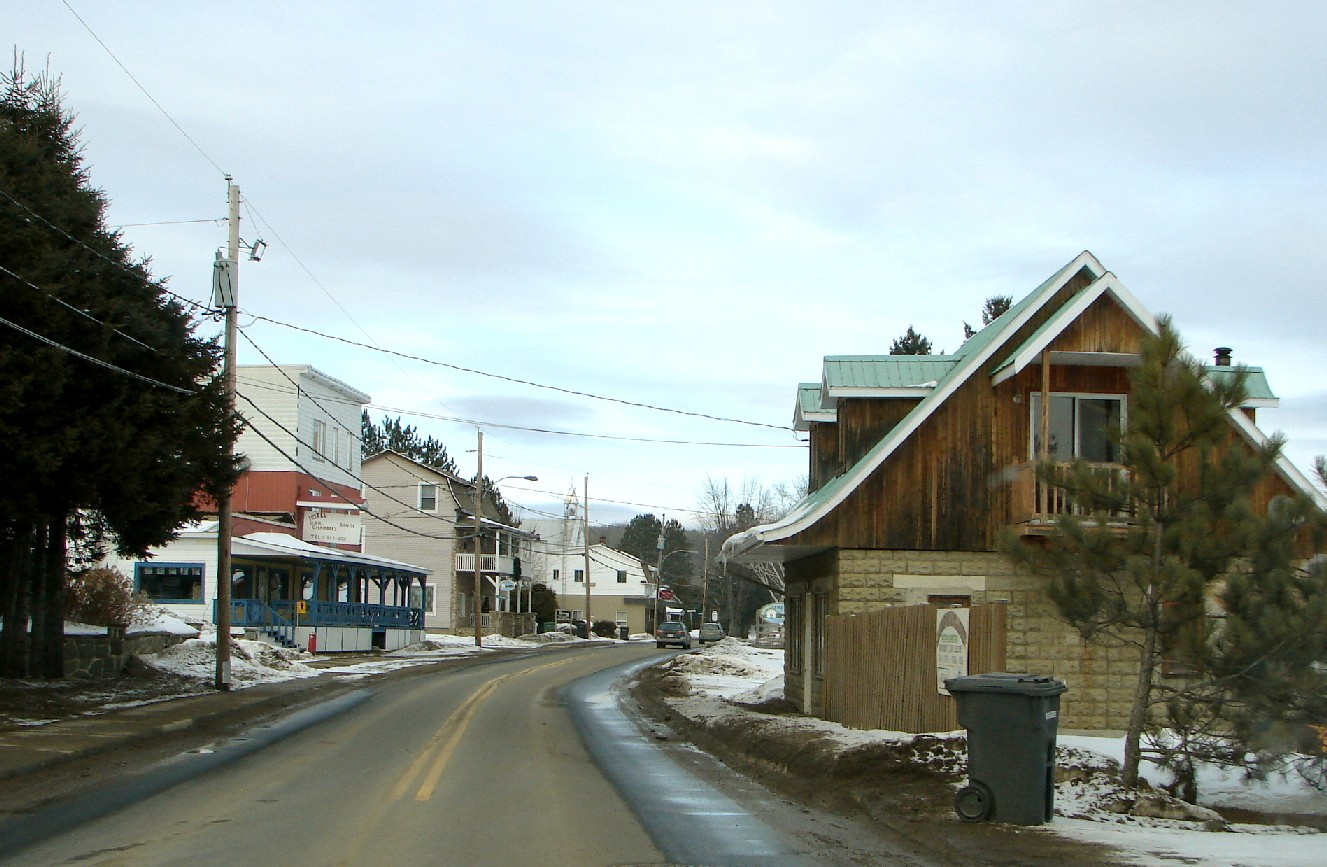
- Road 323 in Amherst

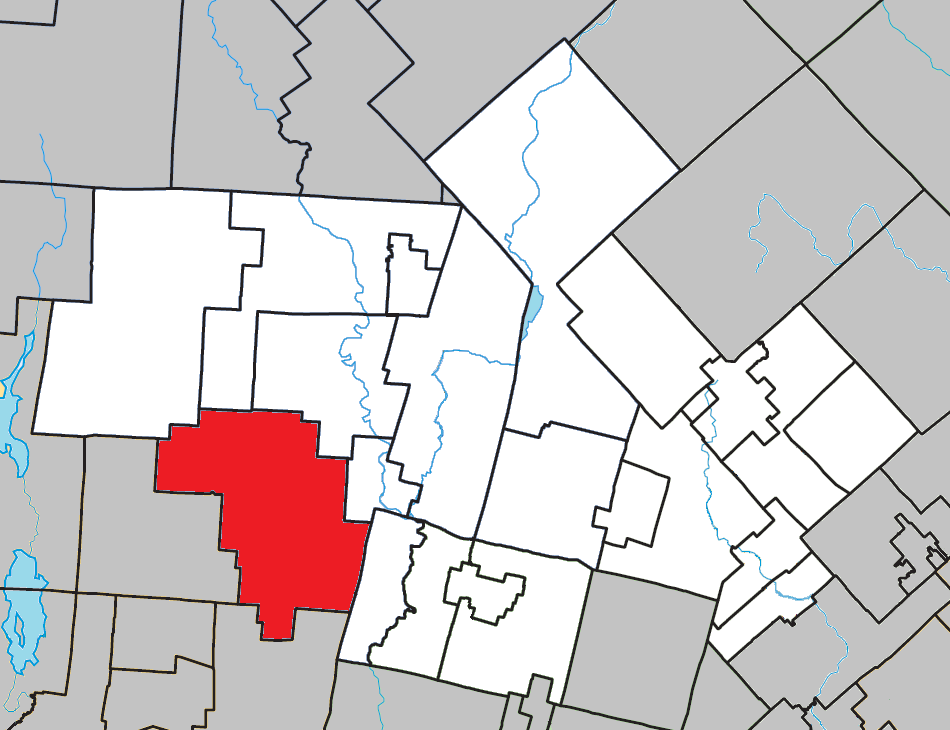
- Location within Les Laurentides RCM

- Location in central Quebec
- Coordinates: 46°03′N 74°46′W
- Country: Canada
- Province: Quebec
- Region: Laurentides
- RCM: Les Laurentides
- Constituted: March 9, 1887
- Named for: Jeffery Amherst

Government
  - Mayor: Jean-Guy Galipeau
  - Fed. riding: Laurentides—Labelle
  - Prov. riding: Labelle

Area
  - Total: 249.53 km^{2} (96.34 sq mi)
  - Land: 227.86 km^{2} (87.98 sq mi)

Population (2021)
  - Total: 1,559
  - Density: 7.6/km^{2} (20/sq mi)
  - Change 2016-21: ▲5.1%
  - Dwellings: 1,613
- Time zone: UTC−5 (EST)
  - Summer (DST): UTC−4 (EDT)
- Postal code(s): J0T 2L0 & J0T 2T0
- Area code(s): 819
- Highways: R-323 R-364
- Website: municipalite.amherst.qc.ca

Amherst is a township municipality in the Canadian province of Quebec, located within Les Laurentides Regional County Municipality.

The village of Vendée is also located within the municipality.

== Demographics ==
In the 2021 Census of Population conducted by Statistics Canada, Amherst had a population of 1,559 living in 784 of its 1,613 total private dwellings, a change of 5.1% from its 2016 population of 1,484. With a land area of 227.86 km^{2} (87.98 sq mi), it had a population density of 6.8/km^{2} (17.7/sq mi) in 2021.

Historical census populations – Amherst, Quebec

Year	Pop.	±%
1891	388	—
1901	605	+55.9%
1911	708	+17.0%
1921	835	+17.9%
1931	827	−1.0%
1941	1,086	+31.3%
1951	921	−15.2%

Year	Pop.	±%
1956	841	−8.7%
1961	757	−10.0%
1966	617	−18.5%
1971	564	−8.6%
1976	560	−0.7%
1981	708	+26.4%
1986	711	+0.4%

Year	Pop.	±%
1991	883	+24.2%
1996	1,145	+29.7%
2001	1,214	+6.0%
2006	1,421	+17.1%
2011	1,524	+7.2%
2016	1,484	−2.6%
2021	1,559	+5.1%

2021 Population figure based on revised count. Population counts are not adjusted for boundary changes.
Source: Statistics Canada

Private dwellings occupied by usual residents (2021): 784 (total dwellings: 1,613)

Mother tongue (2021):

- English as first language: 4.9%
- French as first language: 92.5%
- English and French as first languages: 1.4%
- Other as first language: 1.4%

== Education ==
Sir Wilfrid Laurier School Board operates English-language schools:

- Arundel Elementary School in Arundel
- Sainte Agathe Academy (for high school only) in Sainte-Agathe-des-Monts
