= Val-David =

- Village municipality
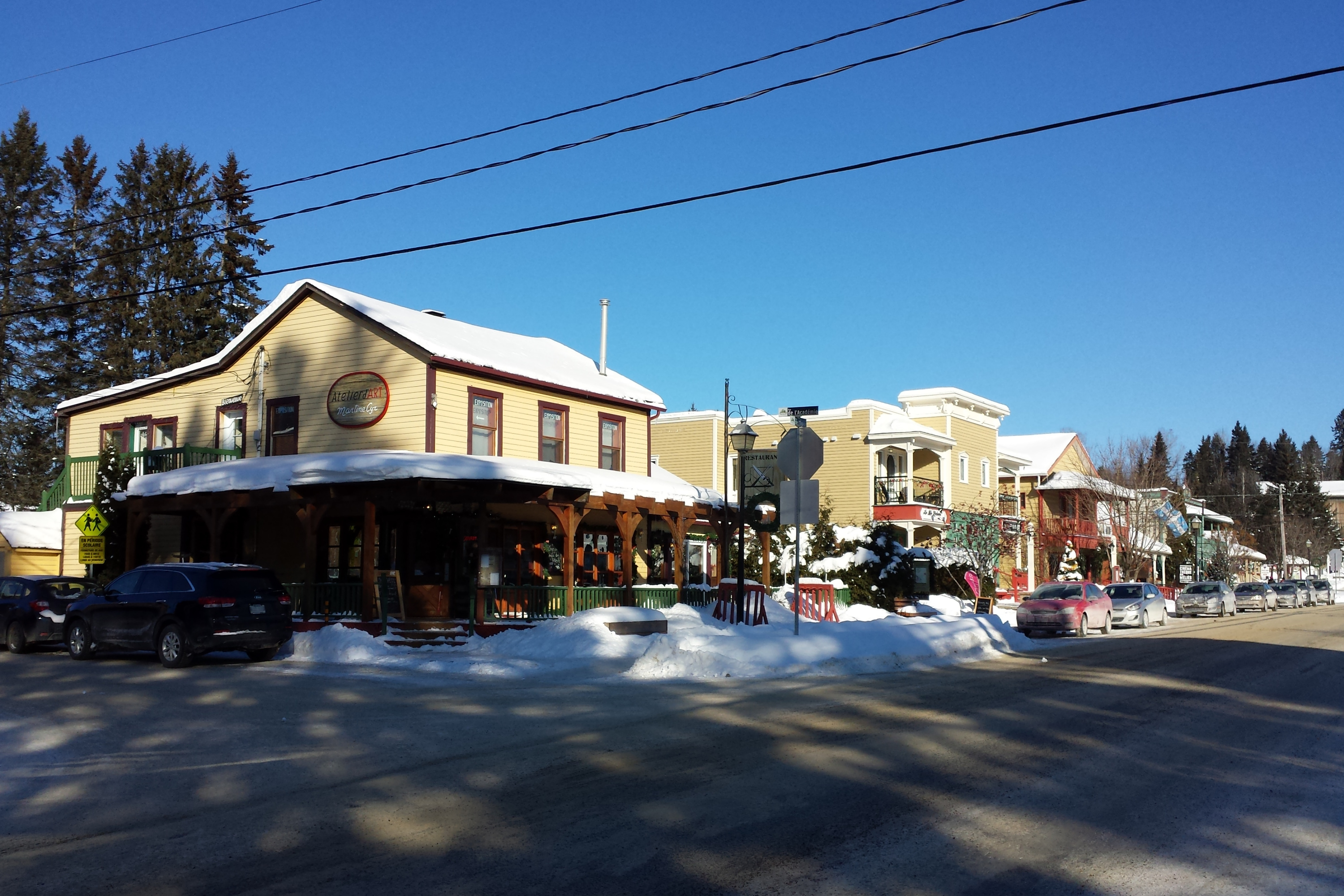
- Motto: Un monde à part, et à partager (A world apart, and to be shared)
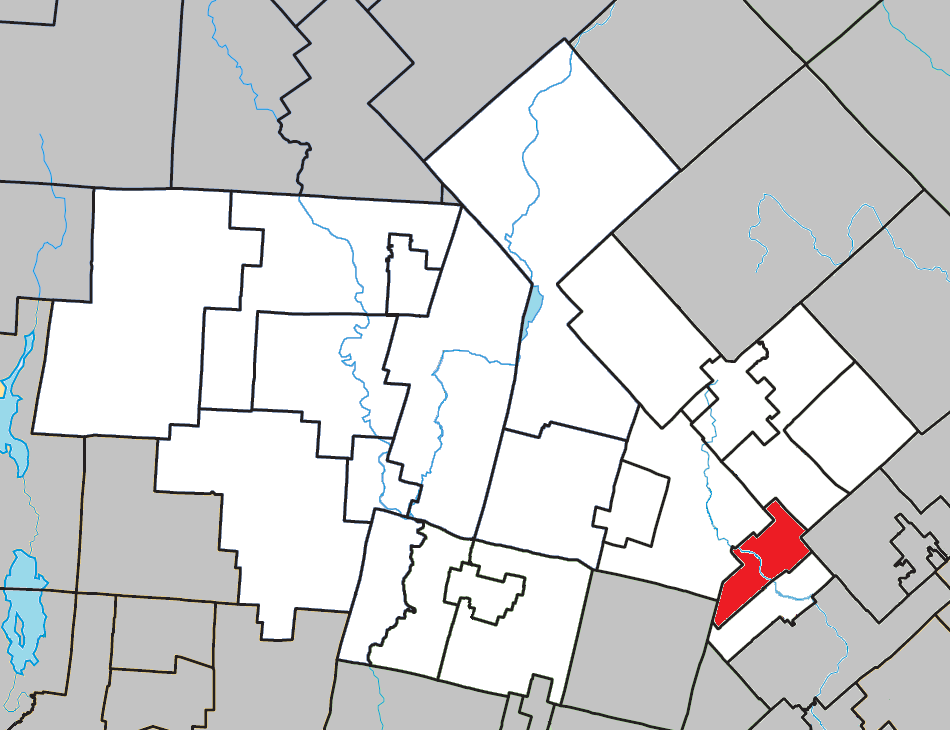
- Location within Les Laurentides RCM

- Location in central Quebec
- Coordinates: 46°02′N 74°13′W
- Country: Canada
- Province: Quebec
- Region: Laurentides
- RCM: Les Laurentides
- Settled: 1870s
- Constituted: May 10, 1921

Government
  - Mayor: Jean-Claude Rocheleau
  - Fed. riding: Laurentides—Labelle
  - Prov. riding: Bertrand

Area
  - Total: 43.87 km^{2} (16.94 sq mi)
  - Land: 42.66 km^{2} (16.47 sq mi)
- Elevation: 322 m (1,056 ft)

Population (2021)
  - Total: 5,558
  - Density: 130.3/km^{2} (337/sq mi)
  - Change 2016-21: ▲13.0%
  - Dwellings: 3,227
- Time zone: UTC−5 (EST)
  - Summer (DST): UTC−4 (EDT)
- Postal code(s): J0T 2N0
- Area code(s): 819
- Highways A-15 (TCH): R-117
- Website: www.valdavid.com

Val-David is a village of more than 5,500 inhabitants in the Laurentian Mountains about 80 kilometres (50 mi) north of Montreal, Quebec, Canada. Attracting about 100,000 tourists a year, Val-David is predominantly francophone with a small anglophone minority.

The village is known for its food scene and artistic and hippie character. Several renowned and amateur artists, writers and dancers live and have lived in Val-David, including Québécois poet Gaston Miron, jazz bassist Charlie Biddle, and singer-songwriter Alan Gerber.

Val-David is also a centre for much outdoor recreational activity as its 2,000-acre (8.1 km^{2}) Parc Dufresne is the most popular rock-climbing destination in eastern Canada. Other features include the Parc Linéaire Le P'tit Train du Nord, a 200 kilometres (120 mi) bike trail, and groomed cross-country ski and snowshoe trails in winter.

== History ==
The place was first known as Belisle's Mills, after the owner of one of the area's first sawmills. In 1873, its post office opened under the name of Mont-Morin, which was renamed Belisle's Mills in 1901. In 1917, the parish of Saint-Jean-Baptiste-de-Belisle or Bélisle was formed, detached from Sainte-Agathe-des-Monts. In 1921, the village municipality was officially established and named after the parish.

In 1923, the post office was renamed Val-David, which also became the official designation of the municipality in 1944. It pays tribute to Louis Athanase David (1882-1953), member of parliament for Terrebonne from 1916 to 1919 and secretary of Quebec from 1919 to 1936, and his father Laurent-Olivier David (1840-1926), member of the House of Commons and author of several books.

It now has its first local community monthly newspaper, ski-se-dit.

== Geography ==
Val-David is located approximately 80 kilometres north of Montreal. Its wooded territory is covered with several hills (Condor, McMaster and King mountains, etc.) and a few small lakes. The Rivière du Nord flows through the municipality from north-west to south-east. It is served by Autoroute 15 and Route 117.

== Demographics ==
In the 2021 Census of Population conducted by Statistics Canada, Val-David had a population of 5,558 living in 2,668 of its 3,227 total private dwellings, a change of 13% from its 2016 population of 4,917. With a land area of 42.66 km^{2} (16.47 sq mi), it had a population density of 130.3/km^{2} (337.4/sq mi) in 2021.

Historical census populations – Val-David

Year	Pop.	±%
1931	500	—
1941	656	+31.2%
1951	940	+43.3%
1956	1,016	+8.1%
1961	1,118	+10.0%
1966	1,281	+14.6%
1971	1,659	+29.5%
1976	2,073	+25.0%
1981	2,336	+12.7%

Year	Pop.	±%
1986	2,497	+6.9%
1991	2,976	+19.2%
1996	3,473	+16.7%
2001	3,819	+10.0%
2006	4,216	+10.4%
2011	4,450	+5.6%
2016	4,917	+10.5%
2021	5,558	+13.0%

Source: Statistics Canada

Private dwellings occupied by usual residents (2021): 2,668 (total dwellings: 3,227)

Mother tongue (2021):

- English as first language: 4.2%
- French as first language: 89.5%
- English and French as first languages: 1.8%
- Other as first language: 3.7%

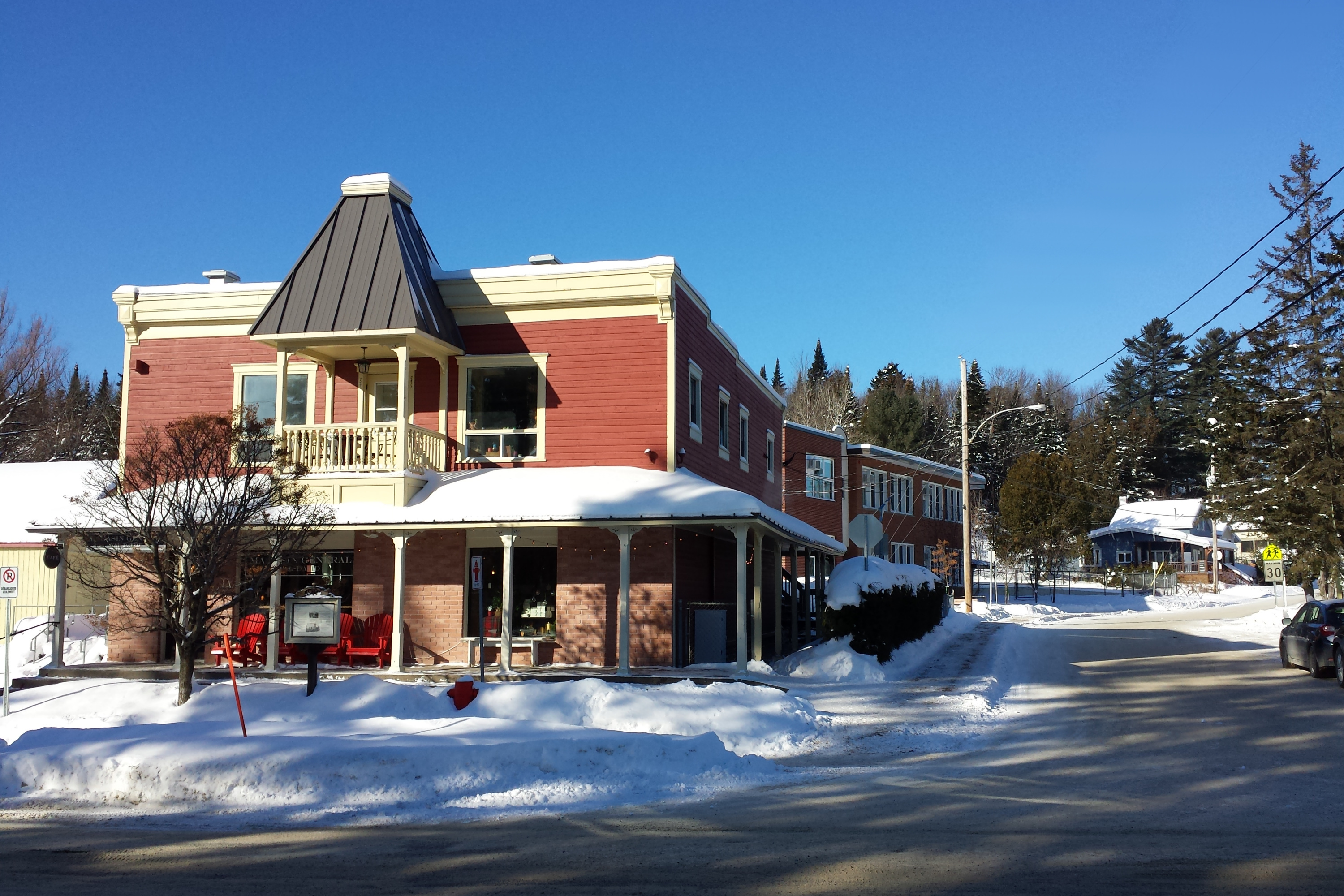
Val-David

== Local government ==
List of former mayors:

- Dominic Asselin (...–2005)
- Pierre Lapointe (2005–2009)
- Nicole Davidson (2009–2017)
- Kathy Poulin (2017–2021)
- Dominique Forget (2021–2025)
- Jean-Claude Rocheleau (2025–2026)

== Infrastructure ==
The town is accessible via Autoroute 15 which links Laval and Montreal towards the south shore suburbs like Brossard and the north shore suburbs like Saint-Jérôme. The autoroute 15 also offers a direct path to and from the United States border. The municipality is located near the northern terminus of the Autoroute which continues further north via Route 117 towards the La Vérendrye Wildlife Reserve north of Mont-Tremblant and Mont-Laurier.

== Education ==
Val-David has three schools (all francophone), one of which is the Waldorf school.

Sainte Agathe Academy (of the Sir Wilfrid Laurier School Board) in Sainte-Agathe-des-Monts serves English-speaking students in this community for both elementary and secondary levels.
