= Arundel, Quebec =

Arundel
- Township municipality
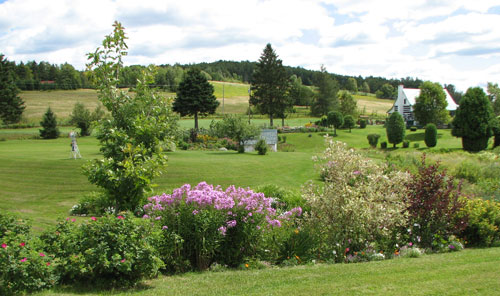

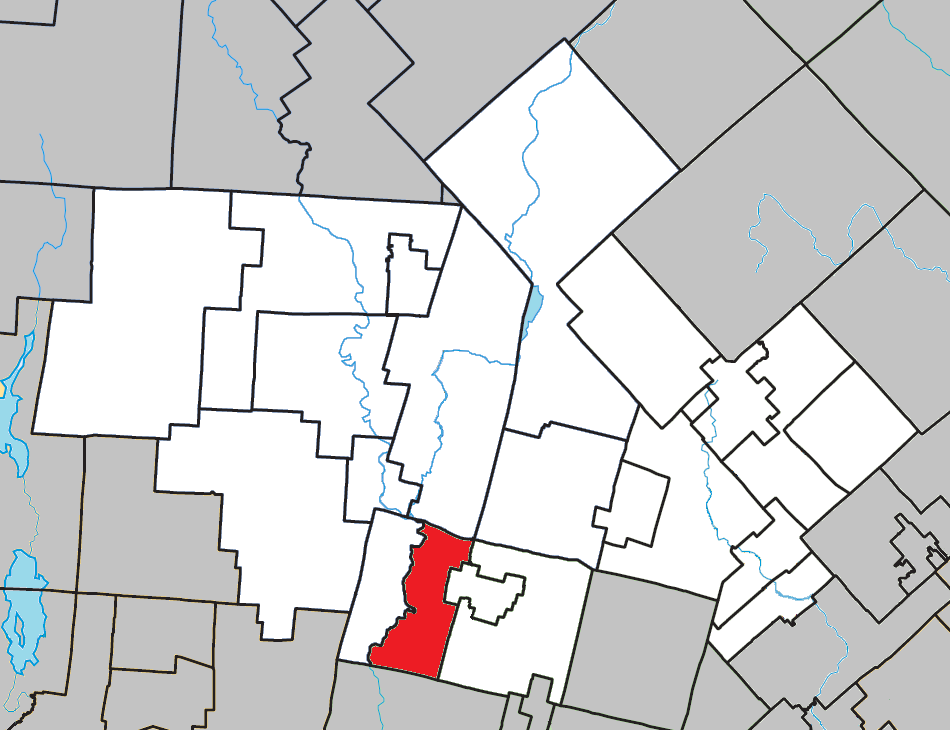
- Location within Les Laurentides RCM

- Location in central Quebec
- Coordinates: 45°58′N 74°37′W
- Country: Canada
- Province: Quebec
- Region: Laurentides
- RCM: Les Laurentides
- Settled: 1854
- Constituted: January 1, 1878
- Named for: Arundel

Government
  - Mayor: Marc Poirier
  - Fed. riding: Laurentides—Labelle
  - Prov. riding: Argenteuil

Area
  - Total: 67.94 km^{2} (26.23 sq mi)
  - Land: 63.45 km^{2} (24.50 sq mi)

Population (2021)
  - Total: 578
  - Density: 9.1/km^{2} (24/sq mi)
  - Change 2016-21: ▲2.7%
  - Dwellings: 402
- Demonym: Arundelite
- Time zone: UTC−5 (EST)
  - Summer (DST): UTC−4 (EDT)
- Postal code(s): J0T 1A0
- Area code(s): 819
- Highways: R-327 R-364
- Website: arundel.ca

Arundel is a township municipality in Quebec, Canada, located 18 kilometres (11 mi) south of Mont-Tremblant.

Arundel Township first appeared on the Gale and Duberger Map of 1795, but was not settled until the mid-19th century when Scottish and Irish immigrants established subsistence farming operations and worked the forests in winter.

Today most of the land is reserved for agricultural use despite strong growth in the region. Much of Arundel borders the Rouge River.

== History ==
The township, proclaimed in 1857, originally belonged to Sydney Robert Bellingham, who named the township after Arundel in West Sussex, England. In 1858, a sawmill was built, attracting settlers to the area.

On January 1, 1878, the United Township Municipality of Arundel-et-De Salaberry was created. In 1881, Arundel Township became an independent municipality when the townships separated (De Salaberry Township becoming part of the United Township Municipality of De Salaberry-et-Grandison, today part of Mont-Tremblant).

In 1926, the township lost roughly half its territory when the Municipality of Huberdeau and the Town of Barkmere were created.

== Demographics ==
In the 2021 Census of Population conducted by Statistics Canada, Arundel had a population of 578 living in 290 of its 402 total private dwellings, a change of 2.7% from its 2016 population of 563. With a land area of 63.45 km^{2} (24.50 sq mi), it had a population density of 9.1/km^{2} (23.6/sq mi) in 2021.

Historical census populations – Arundel, Quebec

Year	Pop.	±%
1881	606	—
1891	743	+22.6%
1901	1,323	+78.1%
1911	1,479	+11.8%
1921	1,434	−3.0%
1931	506	−64.7%
1941	471	−6.9%
1951	516	+9.6%

Year	Pop.	±%
1956	488	−5.4%
1961	456	−6.6%
1966	414	−9.2%
1971	399	−3.6%
1976	474	+18.8%
1981	493	+4.0%
1986	479	−2.8%
1991	555	+15.9%

Year	Pop.	±%
1996	533	−4.0%
2001	555	+4.1%
2006	601	+8.3%
2011	604	+0.5%
2016	563	−6.8%
2021	578	+2.7%

Population counts are not adjusted for boundary changes.
Source: Statistics Canada

Mother tongue (2021):

- French as first language: 56.9%
- English as first language: 36.2%
- English and French as first languages: 2.6%
- Other as first language: 4.3%

== Attractions ==
Arundel is home to the Corridor Aérobique, a 58 kilometer trail used for walking, biking, skiing, snowshoeing and various other outdoor activities. This trail boarders the Rouge River (Laurentides) for some distance and also leads to the neighboring towns of Montcalm, Quebec, Huberdeau, Quebec, Morin-Heights and Lac-des-Seize-Îles just to name a few.

== Government ==
List of former mayors:

- David Flanagan (...–2005)
- Johanna Earle (2005–2009)
- Julia Stuart (2009–2013)
- Guylaine Berlinguette (2013–2017)
- Pascale Blais (2017–2025)
- Marc Poirier (2025–present)

== Education ==
Sir Wilfrid Laurier School Board is the English-language school board of the town. Schools serving the town:

- Arundel Elementary School
- Sainte Agathe Academy (for high school only) in Sainte-Agathe-des-Monts

== See also ==
- List of anglophone communities in Quebec
