= National Young Composers Challenge =

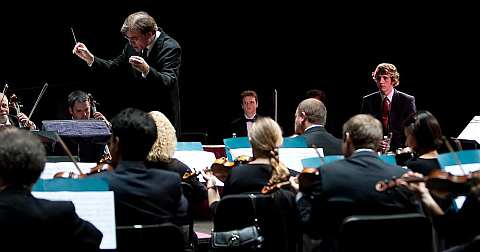
- Maestro Christopher Wilkins conducts a winning composition at the 2009 Composium
- Abbreviation: NYCC
- Founder: Steve Goldman
- Type: Non-profit charitable organization
- Website: youngcomposerschallenge.org

The National Young Composers Challenge (NYCC) is a non-profit charitable organization whose goal is to promote the creation of new orchestral music and the next generation of American composers. The National Young Composers Challenge 501(c)(3) was incorporated in 2008 by Steve Goldman and funded by the Goldman Charitable Trust.

== Orchestra Composition Awards ==
Starting in 2005, the NYCC began holding competitions for young composers between the ages of 13 and 18 years. Submissions are accepted in two categories: Chamber Ensemble (2 to 6 instruments), and Full Orchestra. Three submissions are typically selected in each category. Each of the winning ensemble composers is awarded a $500 honorarium, and each full orchestra composer is awarded a $1000 honorarium. Professional recordings of the performed submissions are made available to the composer and to the public on the NYCC website www.YoungComposersChallenge.org in order to encourage more interest in orchestral composition by young composers, and to help launch the composition careers of the winning students. Initially, submissions were limited to young composers living in the Central Florida area, with the winning compositions performed by the Central Florida Youth Orchestra.

== The Composium ==
Starting in 2007, the range of submissions was extended to allow submissions from young composers living anywhere in the southeast United States, with the winning compositions performed by the Orlando Philharmonic Orchestra in a public event called "The Composium". In 2010, the competition was expanded to the entire United States. The purpose of the Composium is to involve and educate the public in the process of new music creation in order to build greater understanding and support for symphony orchestras and orchestral music. The Composium is part concert, part rehearsal, part recording session, and part seminar. At the Composiums, winning compositions are sight-read, rehearsed, discussed, and recorded in front of a live audience. In 2010, the geographic range of submissions was extended to include the entire United States. In 2013, two Composiums were held: one in Orlando, Florida with winning compositions performed by the Orlando Philharmonic Orchestra, and one in the San Francisco Bay Area with winning compositions performed by the Marin Symphony. In Fall of 2015 a Composium will be held at the Dr. Phillips Center for the Performing Arts in Orlando, Florida.

== Orchestra Composition Workshops ==
Since 2003, the NYCC has presented free all-day composition workshops for up to 150 young musicians, featuring lectures by professional composers and live demonstrations of orchestration techniques by professional chamber ensembles. Workshops have been held at the University of Central Florida and Full Sail University in Central Florida, and at San Domenico School in the San Francisco Bay Area.

== Funding ==
Primary funding for the NYCC is provided by the Goldman Charitable foundation. Additional in-kind sponsors include the Dr. Phillips Center for the Performing Arts, the University of Central Florida, Rollins College, and Full Sail University.
