= Huberdeau, Quebec =

Huberdeau
- Municipality
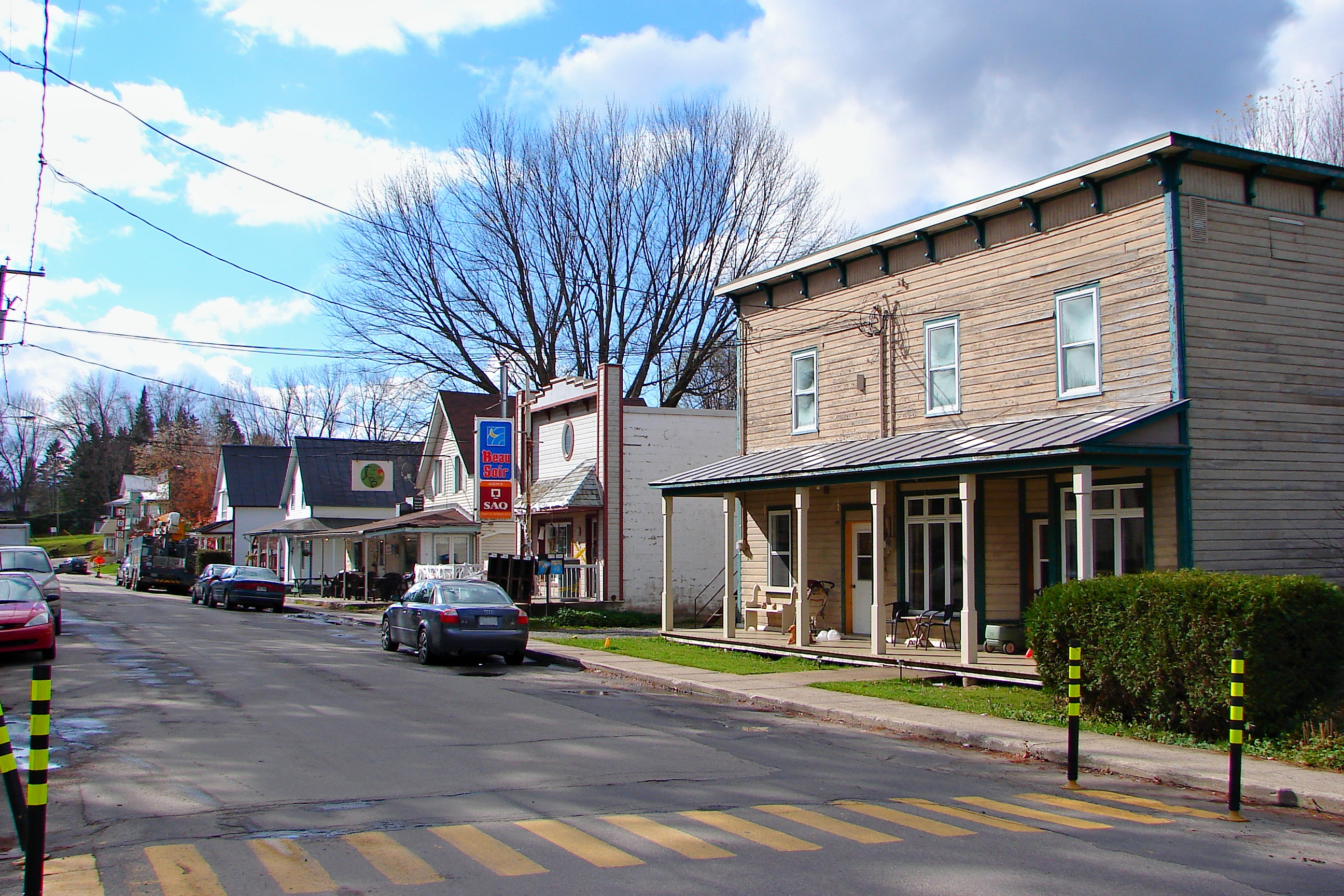

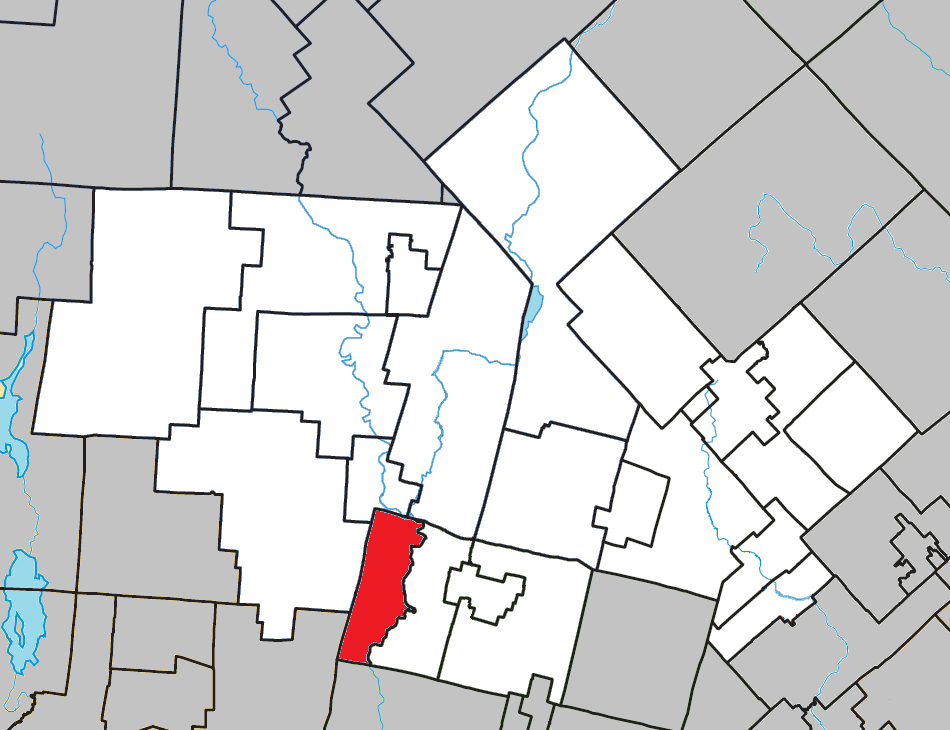
- Location within Les Laurentides RCM

- Location in central Quebec
- Coordinates: 45°58′N 74°38′W
- Country: Canada
- Province: Quebec
- Region: Laurentides
- RCM: Les Laurentides
- Settled: 1883
- Constituted: June 8, 1926
- Named for: Gédéon-Ubalde Huberdeau

Government
  - Mayor: Benoit Chevalier
  - Fed. riding: Laurentides—Labelle
  - Prov. riding: Labelle

Area
  - Total: 58.57 km^{2} (22.61 sq mi)
  - Land: 56.72 km^{2} (21.90 sq mi)

Population (2021)
  - Total: 863
  - Density: 15.2/km^{2} (39/sq mi)
  - Change 2016-21: ▼0.6%
  - Dwellings: 527
- Time zone: UTC−5 (EST)
  - Summer (DST): UTC−4 (EDT)
- Postal code(s): J0T 1G0
- Area code: 819
- Highways: R-364
- Website: huberdeau.ca

Huberdeau (French pronunciation: [ybɛʁdo]) is a village and municipality in the Laurentides region of Quebec, Canada, part of the Les Laurentides Regional County Municipality. It is located along the western banks of the Rouge River.

== History ==
Around 1883, settlers from Lachute, Saint-Hermas, Saint-Jérôme, Sainte-Adèle, and Saint-Sauveur came to the area, and founded the Notre-Dame-de-la-Merci mission. As early as the winter of 1883, the villagers began felling trees to build a chapel. In 1884, some of the timber was used to build the village’s first school. This school, built in 1884, served temporarily as a chapel until the chapel was completed in 1885. The work was supervised by Father Antoine Labelle and Father Samuel Ouimet. In 1895, its post office opened.

In 1904, a terrible forest fire broke out, caused by slash-and-burn fires which farmers had lit to clear the land. The wind picked up, and the fire spread so rapidly that by around nine o’clock in the evening, the orphanage was surrounded by flames. The children were woken up, each was given a small bundle of personal belongings before they were led out into the meadow. Then everyone began to pray. Shortly afterwards, the wind changed direction, rain began to fall, and the fire was extinguished, so that in the end it was nothing more than a scare.

In 1926, the Municipality of Huberdeau was established when it separated from the Township Municipality of Arundel. It is named after Gédéon-Ubalde Huberdeau (1823–1887), who founded an orphanage in the parish in 1887.

The economic depression that began in 1929 was more severe than ever by 1932. Unemployment was rife. There was a shortage of work everywhere. In 1932, thanks to the efforts of Adélard Fournier, who was mayor at the time, the municipal council secured a grant from the provincial government to build concrete pavements in the village, in order to help the municipality’s unemployed.

=== Orphanage ===
The Notre-Dame-de-la-Merci orphanage was situated in Huberdeau. Owned by the Brothers of Mercy of Our Lady of Perpetual Help, the orphanage cared for young people in difficulty from 1924 to 1975. The institution has a long history of abuse. Shortly after the Brothers of Our Lady of Mercy took over its running, it hit the headlines following the death of a young resident. The boy, aged 8, was forcibly held by a brother in a bath of boiling water. He died a few days later at Sainte-Justine Hospital. The ensuing trial shocked public opinion, but had no major repercussions for the orphanage. The mistreatment continued, as evidenced by the numerous testimonies from former residents of the institution. Only a religious education was provided there, so it appears that these children were subject to severe stigmatisation. With little or no education, the orphans at Huberdeau were, in effect, hired out by the institution to local farms and businesses, which exploited them (very low wages, long working hours, no days off).

In 1975, the religious institution sold the orphanage to the Réseau des Affaires Sociales, and the building subsequently continued to accommodate young people in difficulty. The Centre jeunesse des Laurentides, or the Accueil Vert-Pré de Huberdeau, remains a residential centre for teenagers.

== Demographics ==
Historical census populations – Huberdeau, Quebec

Year	Pop.	±%
1931	1,070	—
1941	1,146	+7.1%
1951	1,230	+7.3%
1956	1,180	−4.1%
1961	1,118	−5.3%
1966	774	−30.8%
1971	928	+19.9%
1976	828	−10.8%
1981	898	+8.5%

Year	Pop.	±%
1986	885	−1.4%
1991	903	+2.0%
1996	942	+4.3%
2001	918	−2.5%
2006	924	+0.7%
2011	894	−3.2%
2016	868	−2.9%
2021	863	−0.6%

Source: Statistics Canada

Private dwellings occupied by usual residents (2021): 430 (total dwellings: 527)

Mother tongue (2021):

- English as first language: 2.9%
- French as first language: 94.2%
- English and French as first languages: 1.7%
- Other as first language: 1.2%

== Attractions ==
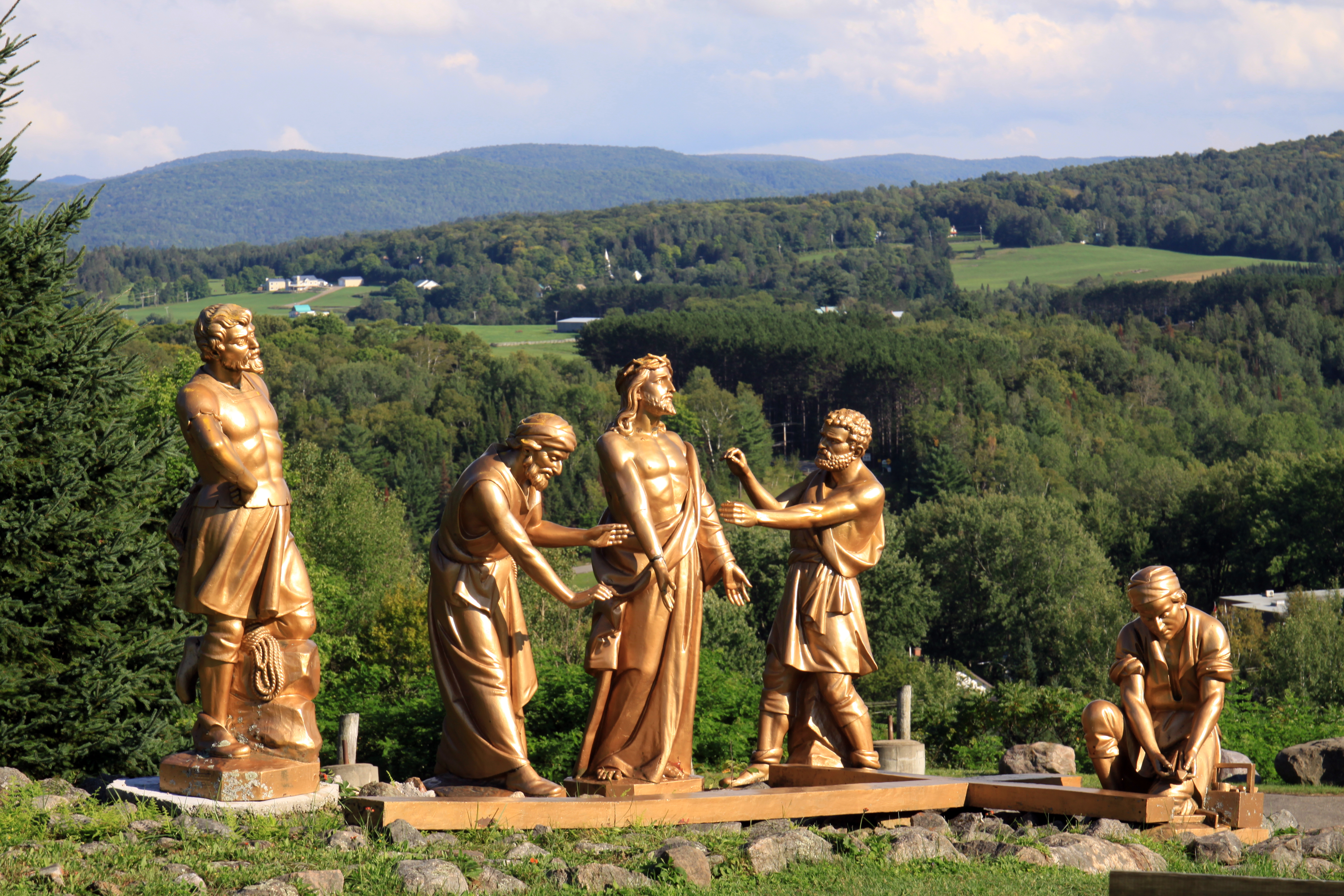
Some of the many statues at the Calvaire d'Huberdeau

The Calvaire d'Huberdeau: The Calvaire d'Huberdeau is a Christian monument composed of a series of 27 statues, each standing about 7 feet tall and weighing some 700 pounds. These statues were imported from Vaucouleurs around 1920 and have served as a beacon of religious faith for the residents of Huberdeau ever since. Standing atop the largest hill in town, the Calvaire now acts as a hiking destination and a lookout for those seeking to admire the beauty of the municipality.

== Local government ==
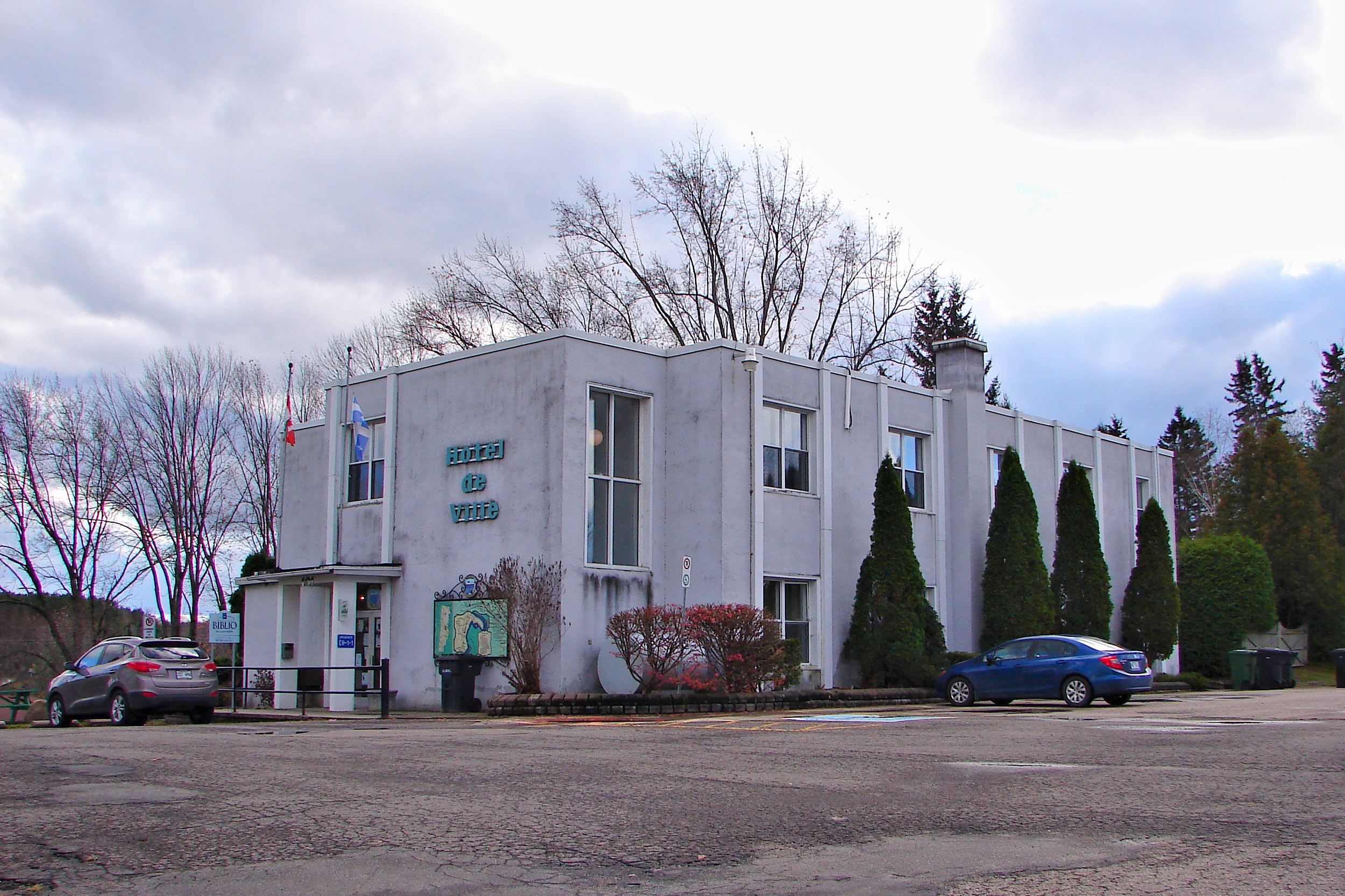
Town hall of Huberdeau

List of former mayors:

- André Lanthier (...–2001)
- Évelyne Charbonneau (2001–2021)
- Fanny Véronique Couture (2021–2022)
- Benoit Chevalier (2022–present)

== Education ==
Sir Wilfrid Laurier School Board operates English-language schools:

- Arundel Elementary School in Arundel
- Sainte Agathe Academy (for high school only) in Sainte-Agathe-des-Monts
