= Labelle, Quebec =

Labelle
- Municipality
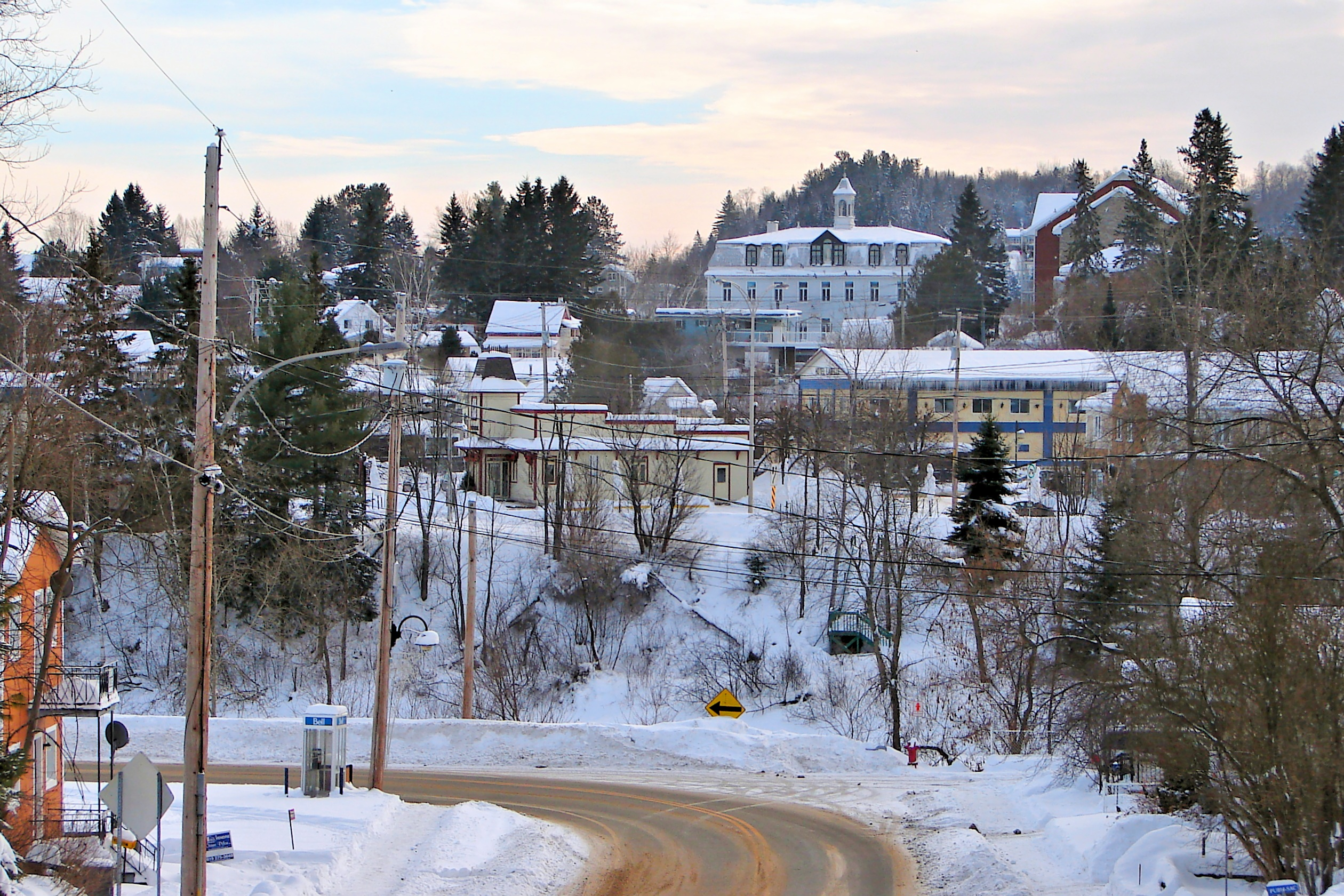
- Downtown Labelle

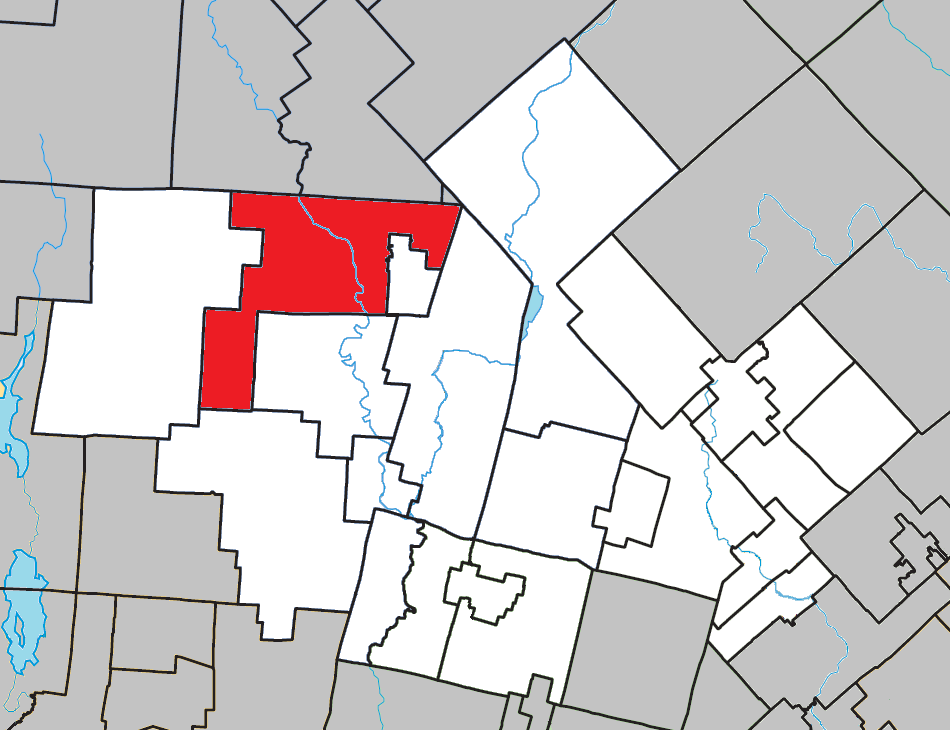
- Location within Les Laurentides RCM

- Location in central Quebec
- Coordinates: 46°17′N 74°44′W
- Country: Canada
- Province: Quebec
- Region: Laurentides
- RCM: Les Laurentides
- Settled: 1878
- Constituted: January 27, 1973

Government
  - Mayor: Vicki Emard
  - Fed. riding: Laurentides—Labelle
  - Prov. riding: Labelle

Area
  - Total: 215.85 km^{2} (83.34 sq mi)
  - Land: 196.69 km^{2} (75.94 sq mi)

Population (2021)
  - Total: 2,765
  - Density: 14.1/km^{2} (37/sq mi)
  - Change 2016-21: ▲11.6%
  - Dwellings: 2,017
- Time zone: UTC−5 (EST)
  - Summer (DST): UTC−4 (EDT)
- Postal code(s): J0T 1H0
- Area code: 819
- Highways: R-117 (TCH)
- Website: www.municipalite.labelle.qc.ca

Labelle (French pronunciation: [labɛl]) is a village and municipality in the Laurentides region of Quebec, Canada, part of the Les Laurentides Regional County Municipality. Its large L-shaped territory surrounds Lake Labelle, and the village is located along the Rouge River and Route 117.

== History ==
In the 19th century, the area was known as Chute-aux-Iroquois or Chute-des-Iroquois, referring to a waterfall on the Rouge River that is still known by that name. Around 1878, settlers from Saint-Jérôme, Sainte-Anne-des-Plaines, and Sainte-Scholastique arrived, and the community was known as La Ferme d'en Bas (The Lower Farm). That same year, the La Nativité-de-Marie-de-Labelle Mission was established (becoming a parish in 1901). In 1881, its post office opened under the name Chute-aux-Iroquois, renamed to Labelle in 1894.

In 1883, the area was originally incorporated as the Township Municipality of Joly. On May 28, 1902, the Village Municipality of Labelle was formed when it split off from Joly Township.

On January 27, 1973, the Township Municipality of Joly and the Village Municipality of Labelle merged to become the Municipality of Labelle.

== Demographics ==
Historical census populations – Labelle (village 1902–1973, municipality 1973–present)

| Year | Pop. | ±% |
|---|---|---|
| 1911 | 826 | — |
| 1921 | 641 | −22.4% |
| 1931 | 685 | +6.9% |
| 1941 | 709 | +3.5% |
| 1951 | 1,003 | +41.5% |
| 1956 | 1,150 | +14.7% |
| 1961 | 1,224 | +6.4% |

| Year | Pop. | ±% |
|---|---|---|
| 1966 | 1,307 | +6.8% |
| 1971 | 1,492 | +14.2% |
| 1976 | 2,007 | +34.5% |
| 1981 | 2,112 | +5.2% |
| 1986 | 2,134 | +1.0% |
| 1991 | 2,103 | −1.5% |
| 1996 | 2,256 | +7.3% |

| Year | Pop. | ±% |
|---|---|---|
| 2001 | 2,272 | +0.7% |
| 2006 | 2,258 | −0.6% |
| 2011 | 2,445 | +8.3% |
| 2016 | 2,477 | +1.3% |
| 2021 | 2,765 | +11.6% |

Population counts are not adjusted for boundary changes.
Source: Statistics Canada

== Local government ==
List of former mayors of Labelle Village:

- Paul Émile Forget (1902–1903, 1905–1908, 1913–1919, 1921–1925, 1927–1933, 1935–1937, 1939–1945)
- Georges Church (1903–1904)
- J. W. Légaré (1904–1905)
- Joseph Demers (1908–1913)
- James Mc Gibbon (1919–1921)
- John Vallée (1925–1927)
- Ubald Marinier (1933–1934)
- Henri Brassard (1934–1935)
- Côme Bertrand (1937–1939)
- J. Avila Gratton (1945–1946)
- Alfred Bélisle (1946–1949)
- Germain Drouin (1949–1952, 1954–1959)
- Charlemagne Duval (1952–1954)
- Georges Labelle (1959–1963)
- Joseph Delphis Gingras (1963–1966)
- Léonard Vézina (1966–1967)
- Alcide Boivin (1967–1971)
- Robert Labelle (1971–1972)
- Charles Bélisle (1972–1973)

List of former mayors of Labelle Municipality:

- Gilbert Brassard (...–2017)
- Robert Bergeron (2017–2021)
- Vicki Emard (2021–present)

== Education ==
Sainte Agathe Academy (of the Sir Wilfrid Laurier School Board) in Sainte-Agathe-des-Monts serves English-speaking students in this community for both elementary and secondary levels.
