= Sir Wilfrid Laurier School Board =

School district in Quebec, Canada

Coordinates: 45.6468°N 73.7833°W

The Sir Wilfrid Laurier School Board (SWLSB, French: Commission scolaire Sir-Wilfrid-Laurier, CSSWL) is a school board headquartered in Rosemère, Quebec in Greater Montreal.

It officially came into existence in July 1998 when English-language schools from eight former school boards were amalgamated. Laurenval School Board, Laurentian School Board and Laurentienne School Trustees were merged, and the English sector of the other school boards of the Laval, Laurentides and Lanaudière administrative regions joined to form the new administrative entity.

The Sir Wilfrid Laurier School Board is the third largest Anglophone school board in the Province of Quebec, Canada.

== Service area ==
The service area, over 35,000 square kilometres (14,000 sq mi) large, includes the City of Laval and the Laurentides and Lanaudière regions.

Wards 11-19 serve portions of Laval.

Communities in Ward 1:

- Amherst
- Arundel
- Baie-des-Chaloupes
- Baie-Obaoca
- Barkmere
- Brébeuf
- Chute-Saint-Philippe
- Doncaster
- Ferme-Neuve
- Harrington
- Huberdeau
- Ivry-sur-le-Lac
- Kiamika
- L'Ascension
- Labelle
- Lantier
- La Conception
- La Macaza
- La Minerve
- Lac-Akonapwehikan
- Lac-Bazinet
- Lac-Cabasta
- Lac-des-Seize-Îles
- Lac-Douaire
- Lac-Ernest
- Lac-Marguerite
- Nominingue
- Lac-Oscar
- Lac-Saguay
- Lac-Supérieur
- Lac-Saint-Paul
- Lac-Tremblant-Nord
- Lac-Wagwabika
- Lac De La Bidière
- Lac-de-la-Maison-de-Pierre
- Lac-de-la-Pomme
- Lac-des-Écorces
- Lac-du-Cerf
- Montcalm
- Mont-Laurier
- Mont-Saint-Michel
- Mont-Tremblant
- Notre-Dame-de-Pontmain
- Notre-Dame-du-Laus
- Saint-Adolphe-d'Howard
- Rivière-Rouge
- Saint-Aimé-du-Lac-des-Iles
- Saint-Donat
- Saint-Faustin-Lac-Carré
- Sainte-Agathe-des-Monts
- Sainte-Anne-du-Lac
- Sainte-Lucie-des-Laurentides
- Val-David
- Val-Morin
- Val-des-Lacs

Communities in Ward 2:

- Estérel
- Mille-Isles
- Morin-Heights
- Saint-Sauveur
- Sainte-Adèle
- Sainte-Marguerite-du-Lac-Masson
- Wentworth
- Wentworth-Nord
- Portions of Grenville-sur-la-Rouge

Communities in Ward 3:

- Brownsburg-Chatham
- Grenville
- Lachute
- Portions of Grenville-sur-la-Rouge

Communities in Ward 4:

- Gore
- Piedmont
- Prévost
- Sainte-Anne-des-Lacs
- Saint-Calixte
- Saint-Colomban
- Saint-Hippolyte
- Saint-Jérôme
- Saint-Lin-Laurentides
- Sainte-Sophie
- Portions of Mirabel

Communities in Ward 5:

- Kanesatake
- Oka
- Pointe-Calumet
- Saint-André-d'Argenteuil
- Saint-Joseph-du-Lac
- Sainte-Marthe-sur-le-Lac
- Saint-Placide
- Portions of Deux-Montagnes

Communities in Ward 6:

- Saint-Eustache
- Portions of Deux-Montagnes
- Portions of Mirabel

Communities in Ward 7:

- Blainville
- Boisbriand
- Sainte-Anne-des-Plaines
- Sainte-Thérèse
- Portions of Terrebonne (in areas formerly in La Plaine)

Communities in Ward 8:

- Bois-des-Filion
- Lorraine
- Rosemère

Communities in Ward 9:

- Charlemagne
- Mascouche
- Repentigny
- Portions of Terrebonne (within areas formerly in the Lachenaie and old Terrebonne municipalities)

Communities in Ward 10:

- Baie-Atibenne
- Baie-de-la-Bouteille
- Berthierville
- Chertsey
- Crabtree
- Entrelacs
- Joliette
- L'Assomption
- L'Épiphanie (parish)
- L'Épiphanie (town)
- La-Visitation-de-l'Île-Dupas
- Lac-Devenyns
- Lac-Légendre
- Lac-Matawin
- Lac-Minaki
- Lac-Santé
- Lac-des-Dix-Mille
- Lac-du-Taureau
- Lanoraie
- Lavaltrie
- Manawan
- Mandeville
- Notre-Dame-de-Lourdes
- Notre-Dame-de-la-Merci
- Notre-Dame-des-Prairies
- Rawdon
- Saint Michel-des-Saints
- Saint-Alexis
- Saint-Alphone-Rodriguez
- Saint-Ambroise-de-Kildare
- Saint-Barthélémy
- Saint-Charles-Borromée
- Saint-Cléophas-de-Brandon
- Saint-Cuthbert
- Saint-Côme
- Saint-Damien
- Saint-Didace
- Saint-Esprit
- Saint-Felix-de-Valois
- Saint-Gabriel
- Saint-Gabriel-de-Brandon
- Saint-Guillaume-Nord
- Saint-Ignace-de-Loyola
- Saint-Jacques
- Saint-Jean-de-Matha
- Saint-Liguori
- Saint-Norbert
- Saint-Paul
- Saint-Pierre
- Saint-Roch-Ouest
- Saint-Roch-de-l'Achigan
- Saint-Sulpice
- Saint-Thomas
- Saint-Zénon
- Sainte-Béatrix
- Sainte-Elizabeth
- Sainte-Geneviève-de-Berthier
- Sainte-Julienne
- Sainte-Marcelline-de-Kildare
- Sainte-Marie-Salomé
- Sainte-Mélanie
- Sainte-Émilie-de-l'Énergie

== Administrative facilities ==
The board's head office is in the Administrative Centre on Montée Lesage in Rosemère, next to Rosemère High School. The board's Educational Services/Complementary Services Centre is located in Rosemère High School near the gymnasiums, adjacent to the administrative building.

The district previously had its headquarters in the Duvernay area of Laval. Prior to its use as a headquarters, the facility was an elementary school. In 1999 the school district announced it was moving the headquarters to Rosemère, stating that the building is out of compliance with safety codes and was too small. The cost for the Rosemère facility was $2,250,000. Some parents at the time argued that the district should have used the money to improve transportation.

== Schools ==
This school board oversees 30 elementary schools, 9 high schools, 4 adult and vocational centres, in which over 15,000 students are enrolled.

List of schools
| Name | Location | City | Type | Year built | Elevator |
|---|---|---|---|---|---|
| Arundel | 5, rue School | Arundel | Elementary | 1933 | No |
| CDC (Lachute) | 57, rue Harriet | Lachute | Adult education | 1964 | No |
| CDC (Pont-Viau) | 60, rue Lahaie | Laval | Vocational training | 1945 | Yes |
| CDC (Vimont) | 2100, boul. des Laurentides | Laval | Adult education | 1989 | No |
| Construc-Plus (only CCSMI) | 246, all. du Golf | Saint-Eustache | Vocational training | 2017 | No |
| Crestview | 750, av. Devonshire | Laval | Elementary | 1962 | No |
| Franklin Hill | 1111, rue Basile-Routhier | Repentigny | Elementary | 2004 | Yes |
| Genesis | 2450, rue Rosemère | Laval | Elementary | 1957 | No |
| Grenville | 184, rue Principale | Grenville | Elementary | 1957 | No |
| Heritage | 878, 9e Av. | Saint-Lin–Laurentides | Elementary | 2024 | Yes |
| Hillcrest Academy | 265, rue Bladen | Laval | Elementary | 1967 | No |
| John F. Kennedy | 500, rue Cardinal | Laval | Elementary | 1965 | No |
| Joliette (Primary) | 345, boul. l'Assomption O | Saint-Charles-Borromée | Elementary | 2012 | Yes |
| Joliette (Secondary) | 107, rue de Lorimier | Joliette | High | 1962 | No |
| Jules Verne | 1701, rue de l'École | Laval | Elementary | 1957 | No |
| Lake-of-Two-Mountains | 2105, rue Guy | Deux-Montagnes | High | 1983 | Yes |
| Laurentia | 457, rue Filion | Saint-Jérôme | Elementary | 1954 | No |
| Laurentian | 455, rue Court | Lachute | Elementary | 1932 | No |
| Laurentian Regional | 448, av. d'Argenteuil | Lachute | High | 1967 | Yes |
| Laval Junior Academy | 2323, boul. Daniel-Johnson | Laval | High | 1969 | No |
| Laval Senior Academy | 3200, boul. du Souvenir O | Laval | High | 1964 | Yes |
| McCaig | 501, rue Northcote | Rosemère | Elementary | 1956 | Yes |
| Morin Heights | 647, rue du Village | Morin-Heights | Elementary | 1951 | No |
| Mountainview (Primary) | 2001, rue Guy | Deux-Montagnes | Elementary | 1961 | No |
| Mountainview (Secondary) | 3065, boul. du Curé-Labelle | Prévost | High | 1944 | No |
| Our Lady of Peace | 3900, rue Nicole | Laval | Elementary | 1968 | No |
| Phoenix Alternative | 1105, rue Victor-Morin | Laval | High | 1964 | No |
| Pierre Elliott Trudeau | 1455, rue Jean-Paul-Riopelle | Blainville | Elementary | 2001 | Yes |
| Pinewood (Holy Rosary) | 412, chem. des Anglais | Mascouche | Elementary | 1956 | Yes |
| Pinewood (Lewis King) | 1728, rue Thacker | Mascouche | Elementary | 1950 | No |
| Rawdon | 4121, rue Queen | Rawdon | Elementary | 1999 | No |
| Rosemere | 530, rue Northcote | Rosemère | High | 1962 | No |
| Souvenir | 4885, chem. du Souvenir | Laval | Elementary | 1963 | No |
| St-Jude | 122, rue St-Jude | Deux-Montagnes | Elementary | 1949 | No |
| St-Paul | 2425, rue Honfleur | Laval | Elementary | 1962 | No |
| St-Paul Annex | 1305 Rue de l'Assomption | Laval | Elementary | 1962 | No |
| St-Vincent (Concorde) | 3000, boul. de la Concorde E | Laval | Elementary | 1960 | No |
| St-Vincent (St-Jacques) | 4881, rue St-Jacques | Laval | Elementary | 1956 | No |
| Ste-Adèle | 60, rue Henri-Dunant | Sainte-Adèle | Elementary | 1951 | No |
| Ste-Agathe Academy | 26, rue Napoléon | Sainte-Agathe-des-Monts | Specialist | 1949 | No |
| Terry Fox | 900, av. des Lacasse | Laval | Elementary | 1994 | Yes |
| Twin Oaks | 700, rue Lisane | Laval | Elementary | 1962 | Yes |

=== Former schools ===
Secondary:

- Mother Teresa Junior High School (French: Mère-Teresa) - Laval
- Laval Junior High School
- Sacred Heart Middle School - Laval
- Batshaw High School - Prévost
- Laurier Senior High School (formerly used as Laval Catholic High School)
- Laval Liberty High School
- Western Laval High School (separated in 2005 into Laval Liberty HS and Laval JHS)

Primary:

- Holy Rosary - Mascouche (1956)
- Lewis King - Mascouche (1950)

=== The Arundel Nature and Science Centre (ANSC) ===
- Arundel Natural Science (1964)
  - Boys Dormitory (1870)
  - Cafeteria & Dormitory (1971)
  - Craft Centre (1978)
  - Garage (2007)
  - Pionner Camp #1 (1975)
  - Pionner Camp #2 (1975)
  - Student Camp (2007)
  - Sugar Camp (1961)

== See also ==
- Area Francophone school boards within the SWLSB territory:
  - Commission scolaire de la Seigneurie-des-Mille-Îles
  - Commission scolaire de Laval
  - Commission scolaire de la Rivière-du-Nord
  - Commission scolaire des Samares
- List of English educational institutions in Quebec
- Other Anglophone school boards in the Montreal area:
  - English Montreal School Board
  - Lester B. Pearson School Board
  - Riverside School Board
