= Quebec Route 311 =

Highway in Quebec, Canada

Route 311

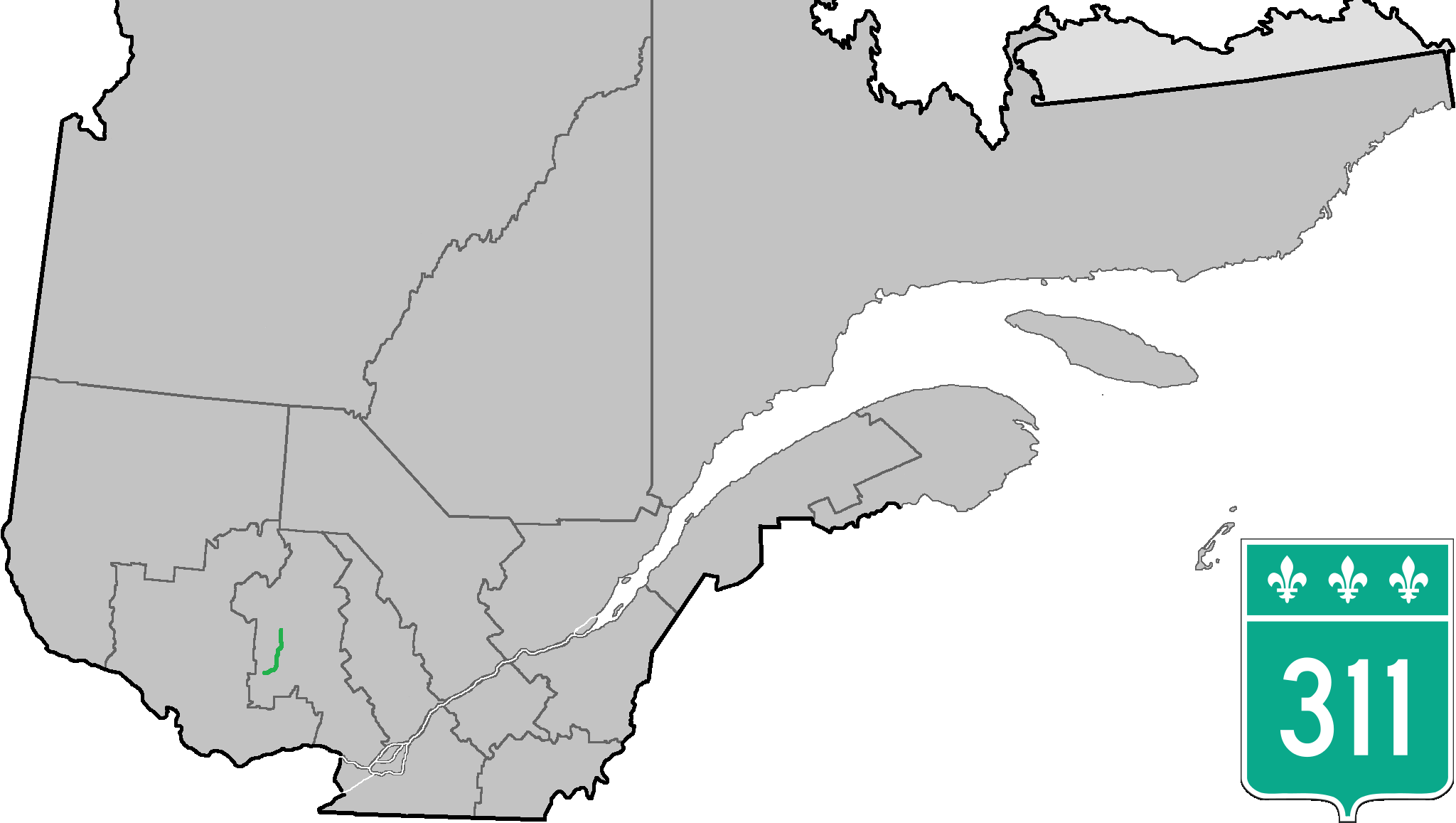

Route information
- Maintained by Transports Québec
- Length: 80.0 km (49.7 mi)

Major junctions
- South end: R-309 in Notre-Dame-de-Pontmain
- R-117 (TCH) in Lac-des-Écorces
- North end: R-309 in Mont-Saint-Michel

Location
- Country: Canada
- Province: Quebec
- Major cities: Lac-des-Écorces, Mont-Saint-Michel

Highway system
- Quebec provincial highways; Autoroutes; List; Former
← R-309	→ R-315

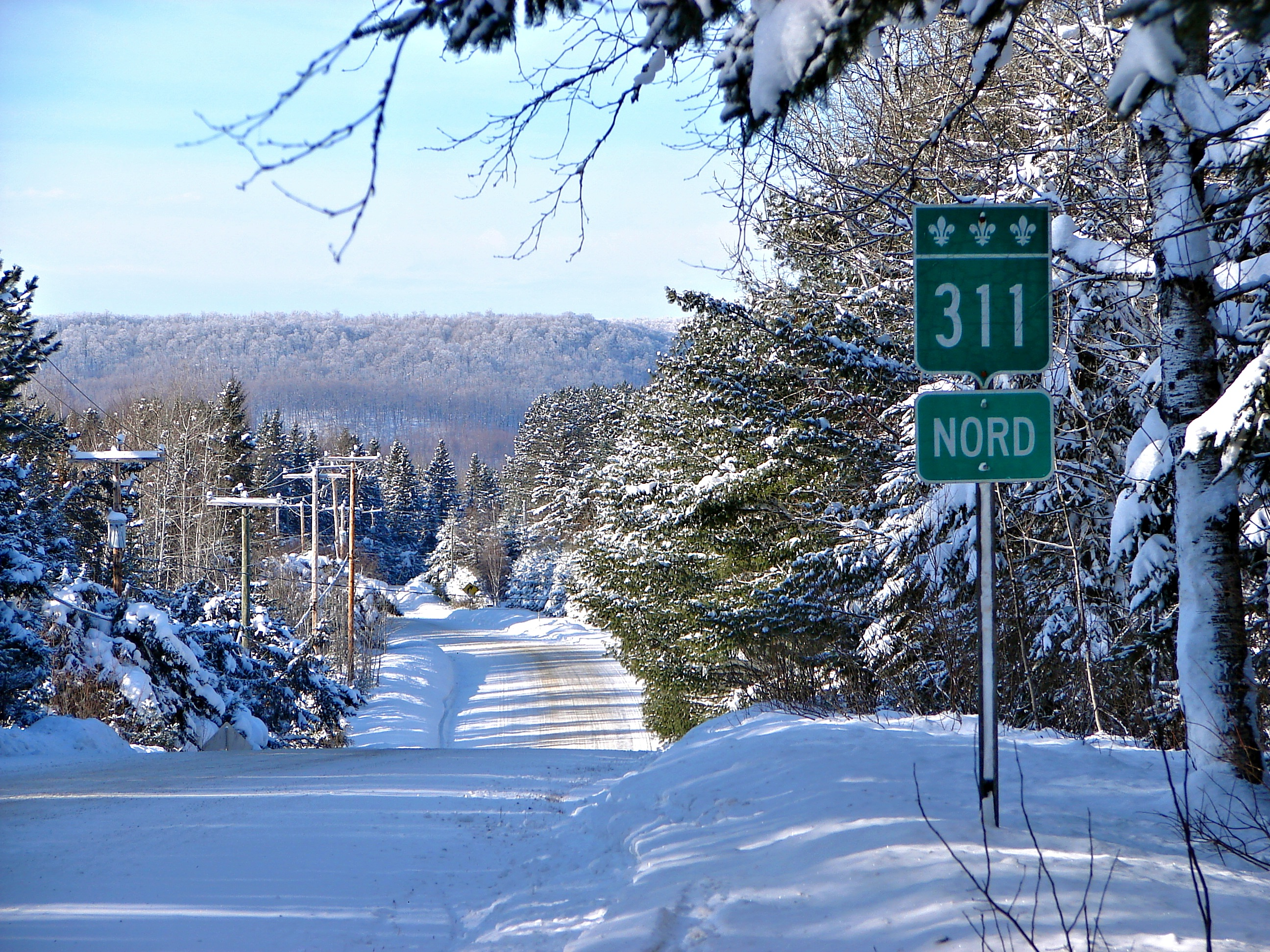
Route 311 near Chute-St-Philippe

Route 311 is a provincial highway located in the Laurentides region of Quebec. The 77 kilometer-highway runs from south to north from the junction of Route 309 in Notre-Dame-de-Pontmain to Mont-Saint-Michel also at the junction of Highway 309. It is briefly concurrent with Route 117 at Beaux-Rivages and Lac-des-Écorces.

== Municipalities along Route 311 ==
- Notre-Dame-de-Pontmain
- Lac-du-Cerf
- Kiamika
- Val-Barrette
- Beaux-Rivages
- Lac-des-Écorces
- Chute-Saint-Philippe
- Lac-Saint-Paul
- Mont-Saint-Michel

== Major intersections ==
RCM or ET	Municipality	km	Junction	Notes
Southern terminus of Route 311
Antoine-Labelle	Notre-Dame-de-Pontmain	0.0	R-309	309 SOUTH: to Notre-Dame-du-Laus; 309 NORTH: to Saint-Aimé-du-Lac-des-Îles
Antoine-Labelle	Lac-des-Écorces	44.0; 44.3	R-117 (TCH) (Overlap 0.3 km)	117 NORTH: to Mont-Laurier; 117 SOUTH: to Lac-Saguay
Antoine-Labelle	Mont-Saint-Michel	80.0	R-309	North end of Route 309; 309 SOUTH: to Ferme-Neuve
Northern terminus of Route 311

== See also ==
- List of Quebec provincial highways
