= L'Ascension, Quebec =

L'Ascension
- Municipality
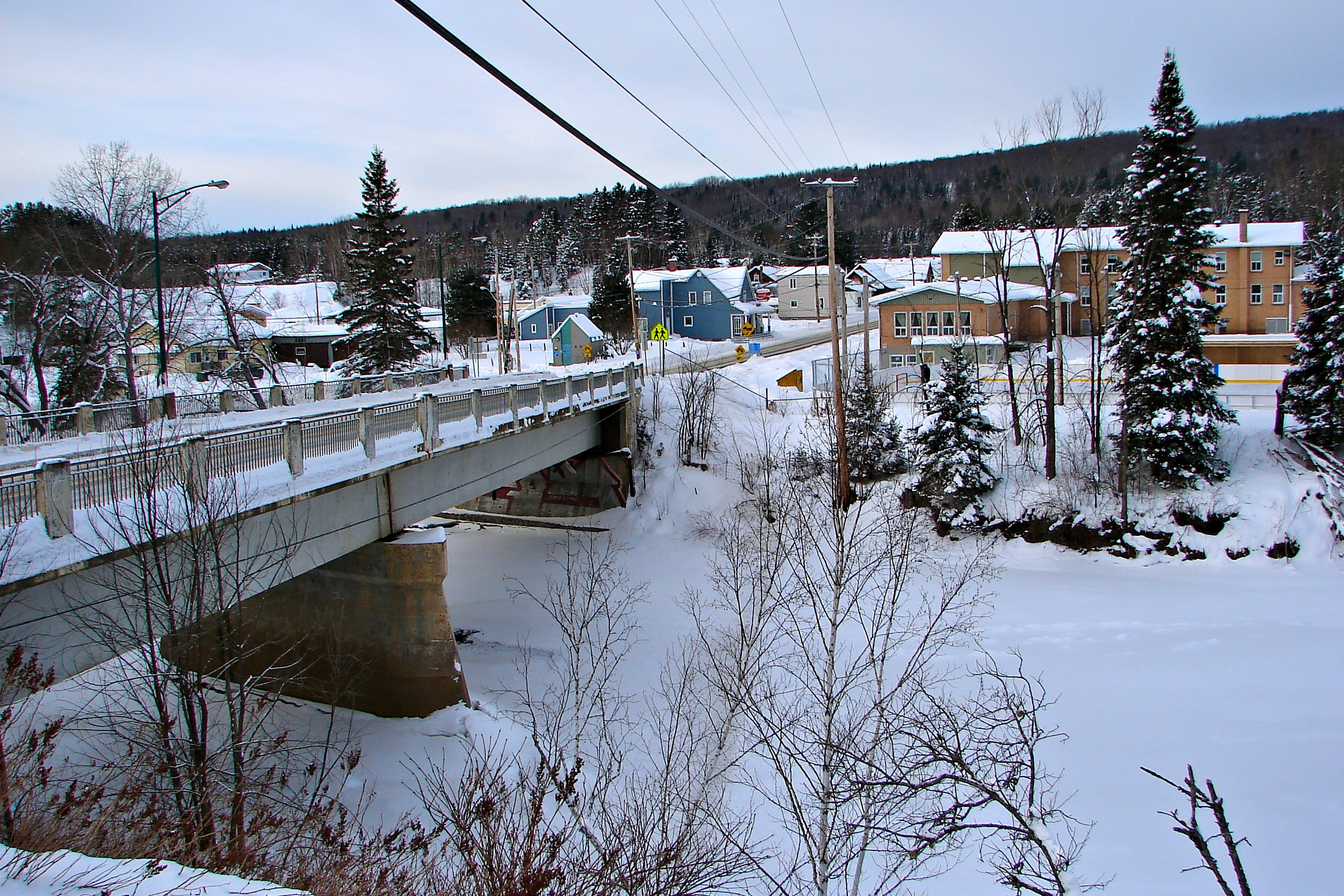

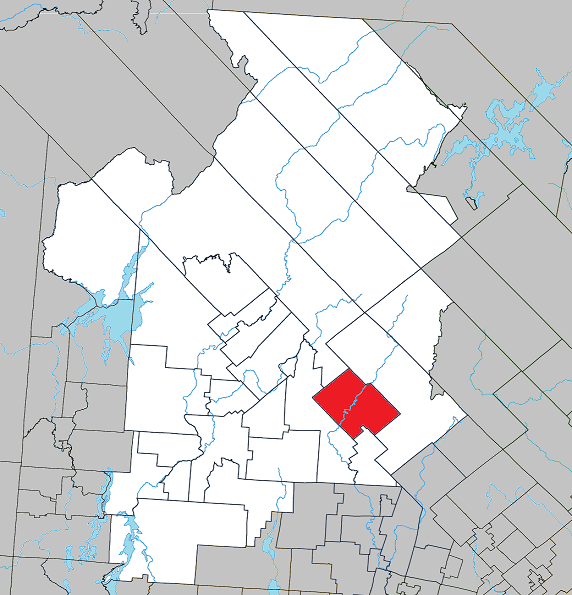
- Location within Antoine-Labelle RCM

- Location in central Quebec
- Coordinates: 46°33′N 74°50′W
- Country: Canada
- Province: Quebec
- Region: Laurentides
- RCM: Antoine-Labelle
- Constituted: September 23, 1905

Government
  - Mayor: Jacques Allard
  - Federal riding: Laurentides—Labelle
  - Prov. riding: Labelle

Area
  - Total: 352.42 km^{2} (136.07 sq mi)
  - Land: 334.82 km^{2} (129.27 sq mi)

Population (2021)
  - Total: 899
  - Density: 2.7/km^{2} (7.0/sq mi)
  - Pop. 2016-2021: ▲13.7%
  - Dwellings: 880
- Time zone: UTC−5 (EST)
  - Summer (DST): UTC−4 (EDT)
- Postal code(s): J0T 1W0
- Area code: 819
- Highways: R-321
- Website: www.municipalite-lascension.qc.ca/fr/

L'Ascension (French pronunciation: [lasɑ̃sjɔ̃]) is a municipality in the Laurentides region of Quebec, Canada, part of the Antoine-Labelle Regional County Municipality. The area is known as La Vallée de la Rouge (English: The Valley of the Rouge (river)).

== History ==
L'Ascension is no exception to the majority of the municipalities in the north of the Laurentides, like most of those, it has its origins in logging. It was around 1855 that the Hamilton Brothers company, which had been logging the forests of the Red River since the beginning of the century, had a forest farm built, the furthest north on the river, to supply its most distant sites. Aptly named Ferme d'en Haut because of its position on the river, the farm was located about 2 kilometers north of the current village core and extended on both banks, with a barge allowing people to cross the river.

From the beginning of the 1880s, the cantons of Haute-Rouge were open to colonization, including those of Lynch and Mousseau where L'Ascension is located today. With the arrival of settler-farmers, logging companies like Hamilton Brothers changed their tune; rather than producing the foodstuffs necessary to supply their logging sites, they began to buy these same products from the settlers who, then isolated from the markets of the rest of the province, had no other choice but to sell at ridiculously low prices.

This is how the Hamilton Brothers got rid of Ferme d’en Haut, it having become useless to them, in 1886 by selling it to the settler Ambroise Charbonneau. The latter was encouraged by the success of other colonization ventures on the Rouge which had taken place a few years previously in addition to the productivity of the farm he had just purchased, Ferme d’en Haut. However, he was not the first inhabitant of the future village of L'Ascension, because already in 1884 the priest Labelle mentioned in a letter to Monseigneur Fabre that the chapel of L'Ascension was under construction, which attests to the presence of at least a few farming families.

In 1891, the first missionary made a pastoral visit to the few families that had settled there, and named the place L'Ascension since his visit coincided with the day of the Feast of the Ascension of Jesus Christ.

In the years that followed, other settlers joined the first families and the village grew. Towards the end of the 19th century, the village chapel began to be too small to accommodate all the faithful of L'Ascension, which led in 1903 to the construction of the church on lot 25 of range II of the Mousseau canton, designating thereby the very place where the heart of the village would be formed in the years to come. This decision was taken by priest Eugène Corbeil, the first priest of the brand new parish of L'Ascension, established that same year (the territory of the village had been a mission since 1891 served by the Jesuits of Nominingue).

On September 23, 1905, the Parish Municipality of L'Ascension was officially founded. In just two years, the community acquired two essential institutions to be considered a proper village: parish status and municipal status. Julien Beauvais is elected as first mayor. The current town hall was built in 1925. The building was originally clad in wood and covered with sheet metal. It was renovated in 1948 and is now part of the cultural heritage of Quebec.

Since its beginnings, the economy of Ascension has been closely linked to the forestry industry. Many residents earn their living from working in the forest, whether as loggers and log drivers or as “jobbers” (subcontractors for large logging companies like Hamilton Brothers or, later, Canadian International Paper). . This reality persists over time and continues to be true today, although the crises in the forest economy, first in the early 1980s and then in the early 2000s, have greatly slowed down the forest industry in the Ascension region compared to the dynamism of the first decades.

As with many other villages in the Hautes-Laurentides, L'Ascension will begin to diversify its economy by launching into the tourist economy, a good thing considering the difficulties that the forestry economy will experience in the second half of the 20th century. First appeared private clubs and outfitters, such as Club Patry inc. from 1947, located northeast of the village. Later, from the 1970s, we saw the appearance of controlled exploitation zones (zecs), such as the Maison-de-Pierre zec north of L'Ascension, which still testifies today to the tourist vocation which inhabits the village of L'Ascension and which added to the forestry vocation that the village had since its origins.

On December 14, 1996, the parish municipality changed statutes and became a (regular) municipality.

== Demographics ==
Canada census – L'Ascension community profile

	2021	2016	2011
Population	899 (+13.7% from 2016)	791 (-6.3% from 2011)	844 (-2.0% from 2006)
Land area	334.82 km^{2} (129.27 sq mi)	340.85 km^{2} (131.60 sq mi)	341.90 km^{2} (132.01 sq mi)
Population density	2.7/km^{2} (7.0/sq mi)	2.3/km^{2} (6.0/sq mi)	2.5/km^{2} (6.5/sq mi)
Median age	61.2 (M: 62.0, F: 59.6)	57.7 (M: 58.1, F: 57.5)	53.9 (M: 54.5, F: 53.0)
Private dwellings	880 (total) 488 (occupied)	877 (total)	853 (total)
Median household income	$48,400	$41,045	$39,820

References: 2021 2016 2011

Historical census populations – L'Ascension, Quebec

Year	Pop.	±%
1911	520	—
1921	705	+35.6%
1931	589	−16.5%
1941	648	+10.0%
1951	695	+7.3%
1956	599	−13.8%
1961	600	+0.2%

Year	Pop.	±%
1966	577	−3.8%
1971	565	−2.1%
1976	504	−10.8%
1981	560	+11.1%
1986	626	+11.8%
1991	662	+5.8%
1996	755	+14.0%

Year	Pop.	±%
2001	783	+3.7%
2006	861	+10.0%
2011	844	−2.0%
2016	791	−6.3%
2021	899	+13.7%

Source: Statistics Canada

Mother tongue (2021):

- English as first language: 2.2%
- French as first language: 96.1%
- English and French as first language: 0.6%
- Other as first language: 1.1%

== Government ==
L'Ascension forms part of the federal electoral district of Laurentides—Labelle and has been represented by Marie-Hélène Gaudreau of the Bloc Québécois since 2019. Provincially, L'Ascension is part of the Labelle electoral district and is represented by Chantale Jeannotte of the Coalition Avenir Québec since 2018.

L'Ascension federal election results
Year	Liberal		Conservative		Bloc Québécois		New Democratic		Green	
2021	26%	147	13%	76	48%	279	5%	29	2%	11
2019	30%	176	12%	69	50%	287	3%	16	4%	23
2015	28%	102	7%	28	39%	143	22%	80	3%	11
2011	6%	23	11%	40	32%	115	45%	161	6%	20
2008	27%	90	15%	51	47%	155	7%	24	4%	12
2006	11%	37	24%	83	57%	198	4%	13	5%	18
2004	27%	93	6%	19	61%	212	3%	11	3%	10

L'Ascension provincial election results
Year	CAQ		Liberal		QC solidaire		Parti Québécois	
2022	52%	207	3%	12	11%	43	21%	83
2018	43%	231	9%	49	9%	46	36%	192
2014	22%	108	21%	103	5%	22	52%	254
2012	20%	80	14%	56	4%	17	57%	229

List of former mayors:

- Yves Meilleur (...–2017)
- Luc St-Denis (2017–2021)
- Jacques Allard (2021–present)

== Education ==
Sainte Agathe Academy (of the Sir Wilfrid Laurier School Board) in Sainte-Agathe-des-Monts serves English-speaking students in this community for both elementary and secondary levels.

== See also ==
- List of municipalities in Quebec
