= Labelle (provincial electoral district) =

Provincial electoral district in Quebec, Canada

Quebec electoral district

Provincial electoral district
- Legislature: National Assembly of Quebec
MNA
Catherine Drouin
Parti Québécois
- District created: 1912
- District abolished: 1972
- District re-created: 1980
- First contested: 1912, 1981
- Last contested: 1970, 2026

Demographics
- Electors (2012): 47,249
- Area (km²): 18,072.1
- Census division(s): Antoine-Labelle (all), Les Laurentides (part)
- Census subdivision(s): Amherst, Brébeuf, Chute-Saint-Philippe, Ferme-Neuve, Huberdeau, Kiamika, La Conception, La Macaza, La Minerve, Labelle, Lac-des-Écorces, Lac-du-Cerf, Lac-Saguay, Lac-Saint-Paul, Lac-Supérieur, Lac-Tremblant-Nord, L'Ascension, Mont-Blanc, Mont-Laurier, Mont-Saint-Michel, Mont-Tremblant, Nominingue, Notre-Dame-de-Pontmain, Notre-Dame-du-Laus, Rivière-Rouge, Saint-Aimé-du-Lac-des-Îles, Sainte-Anne-du-Lac; Baie-des-Chaloupes, Lac-Akonapwehikan, Lac-Bazinet, Lac-De La Bidière, Lac-de-la-Maison-de-Pierre, Lac-de-la-Pomme, Lac-Douaire, Lac-Ernest, Lac-Marguerite, Lac-Oscar, Lac-Wagwabika

Labelle (French pronunciation: [labɛl]) is a provincial electoral district in the Laurentides region of Quebec, Canada, that elects members to the National Assembly of Quebec. It notably includes the municipalities of Mont-Laurier, Mont-Tremblant, Rivière-Rouge, Mont-Blanc, Lac-des-Écorces, and Labelle.

It was originally created for the 1912 election from part of the Ottawa electoral district. Its final election was in 1970. It disappeared in the 1973 election and its successor electoral district was Laurentides-Labelle. However, Laurentides-Labelle disappeared in the 1981 election and its successor electoral district was the re-created Labelle.

In the change from the 2001 to the 2011 electoral map, its territory was unchanged.

The riding is named after Antoine Labelle, the priest who help developed the Laurentides region north of Montreal during an economic crisis during the 1880s.

== Members of the Legislative Assembly / National Assembly ==
Legislature	Years	Member	Party
Riding created from Ottawa
13th	1912–1916	Hyacinthe-Adélard Fortier	Liberal
14th	1916–1917	Hyacinthe-Adélard Fortier	Liberal
14th	1917–1919	Honoré Achim	Liberal
15th	1919–1921	Honoré Achim	Liberal
15th	1922–1923	Désiré Lahaie	Liberal
16th	1923–1927	Pierre Lortie	Liberal
17th	1927–1931	Pierre Lortie	Liberal
18th	1931–1935	Pierre Lortie	Liberal
19th	1935–1936	Albiny Paquette	Action liberale nationale
20th	1936–1939	Albiny Paquette	Union Nationale
21st	1939–1944	Albiny Paquette	Union Nationale
22nd	1944–1948	Albiny Paquette	Union Nationale
23rd	1948–1952	Albiny Paquette	Union Nationale
24th	1952–1956	Albiny Paquette	Union Nationale
25th	1956–1958	Albiny Paquette	Union Nationale
25th	1958–1959†	Pierre Bohémier	Union Nationale
25th	1959–1960	Fernand Lafontaine	Union Nationale
26th	1960–1962	Fernand Lafontaine	Union Nationale
27th	1962–1966	Fernand Lafontaine	Union Nationale
28th	1966–1970	Fernand Lafontaine	Union Nationale
29th	1970–1973	Fernand Lafontaine	Union Nationale
Riding dissolved into Laurentides-Labelle
Riding re-created from Laurentides-Labelle
32nd	1981–1984	Jacques Léonard	Parti Québécois
32nd	1984–1985	Jacques Léonard	Independent
33rd	1985–1989	Damien Hétu	Liberal
34th	1989–1994	Jacques Léonard	Parti Québécois
35th	1994–1998	Jacques Léonard	Parti Québécois
36th	1998–2001	Jacques Léonard	Parti Québécois
36th	2001–2003	Sylvain Pagé	Parti Québécois
37th	2003–2007	Sylvain Pagé	Parti Québécois
38th	2007–2008	Sylvain Pagé	Parti Québécois
39th	2008–2012	Sylvain Pagé	Parti Québécois
40th	2012–2014	Sylvain Pagé	Parti Québécois
41st	2014–2018	Sylvain Pagé	Parti Québécois
42nd	2018–2022	Chantale Jeannotte	Coalition Avenir Québec
43rd	2022–2026	Chantale Jeannotte	Coalition Avenir Québec
44th	2026–Present	Catherine Drouin	Parti Québécois

== Election results ==
2026 Quebec general election
** Preliminary results — Not yet official **
Party	Candidate	Votes	%	±%
Parti Québécois	Catherine Drouin	14,016	39.85	+20.72
Conservative	Jean-François Frigon	6,673	18.97	+9.43
Coalition Avenir Québec	Chantal Roussel	6,672	18.97	–34.11
Liberal	Shawn Latulippe	4,326	12.30	+7.25
Québec solidaire	Julie B. Savard	2,860	8.13	–4.13
Démocratie directe	Natacha Alarie	233	0.66	N/A
Climat Québec	Jean-Simon Boileau	211	0.60	–0.34
Présence	Pierre Boutin	181	0.51	N/A
Total valid votes		35,172	98.02	+0.14
Total rejected ballots		712	1.98	–0.14
Turnout		35,884	65.90	+0.75
Electors on the lists		54,450		
Parti Québécois gain from Coalition Avenir Québec		Swing		+5.65
Source: Élections Québec

2022 Quebec general election
Party	Candidate	Votes	%	±%
Coalition Avenir Québec	Chantale Jeannotte	17,662	53.08	+16.58
Parti Québécois	Daniel Corbeil	6,366	19.13	–15.51
Québec solidaire	Jasmine Roy	4,079	12.26	–3.08
Conservative	Claude Paquin	3,173	9.54	+8.72
Liberal	Annie Bélizaire	1,679	5.05	–5.86
Climat Québec	François Beauchamp	313	0.94	–
Total valid votes		33,272	98.16	–0.42
Total rejected ballots		622	1.84	+0.42
Turnout		33,894	65.15	–2.05
Electors on the lists		52,028	–	–

2018 Quebec general election
Party	Candidate	Votes	%	±%
Coalition Avenir Québec	Chantale Jeannotte	11,784	36.5	+15.41
Parti Québécois	Sylvain Pagé	11,185	34.64	-10.52
Québec solidaire	Gabriel Dagenais	4,954	15.34	+7.3
Liberal	Nadine Riopel	3,524	10.91	-14.12
Green	René Fournier	395	1.22	
Conservative	Francis Brosseau	265	0.82	
Citoyens au pouvoir	Régis Ostigny	181	0.56	
Total valid votes		32,288	98.58	
Total rejected ballots		465	1.42	
Turnout		32,753	67.20	
Eligible voters		48,741		
Coalition Avenir Québec gain from Parti Québécois		Swing		+12.97
Source(s) "Rapport des résultats officiels du scrutin". Élections Québec.

2014 Quebec general election
Party	Candidate	Votes	%	±%
Parti Québécois	Sylvain Pagé	13,806	45.16	–8.38
Liberal	Christian Lacroix	7,651	25.03	–3.94
Coalition Avenir Québec	Cedrick Remy-Quevedo	6,557	21.09	+9.70
Québec solidaire	Gabriel Dagenais	2,457	8.04	+4.99
Option nationale	Philippe Richard-Léonard	211	0.69	
Total valid votes		30,572	100.0	
Total rejected ballots		562	1.81	
Turnout		31,134	65.35	
Electors on the lists		47,641		
Parti Québécois hold		Swing		–2.22
Change for Coalition Avenir Québec is compared from Action démocratique.
Source: Élections Québec

2008 Quebec general election
Party	Candidate	Votes	%	±%
Parti Québécois	Sylvain Pagé	13,195	53.54	
Liberal	Deborah Belanger	7,140	28.97	
Action démocratique	Claude Ouellette	2,807	11.39	
Green	Francois Beauchamp	754	3.06	
Québec solidaire	Luc Boisjoli	751	3.05	

== See also ==
- List of Quebec provincial electoral districts
- Canadian provincial electoral districts
