= Lac-du-Cerf =

- Municipality
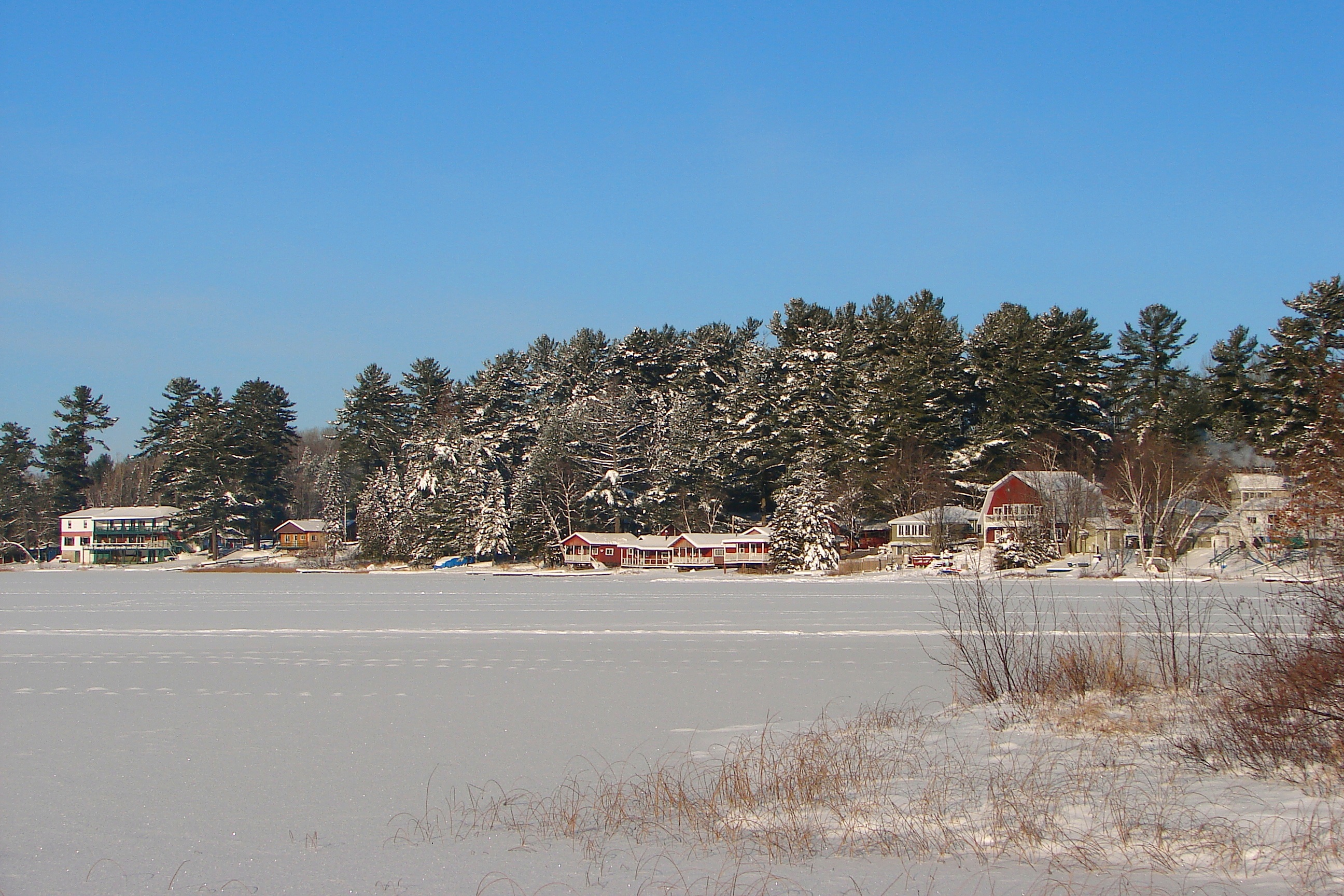

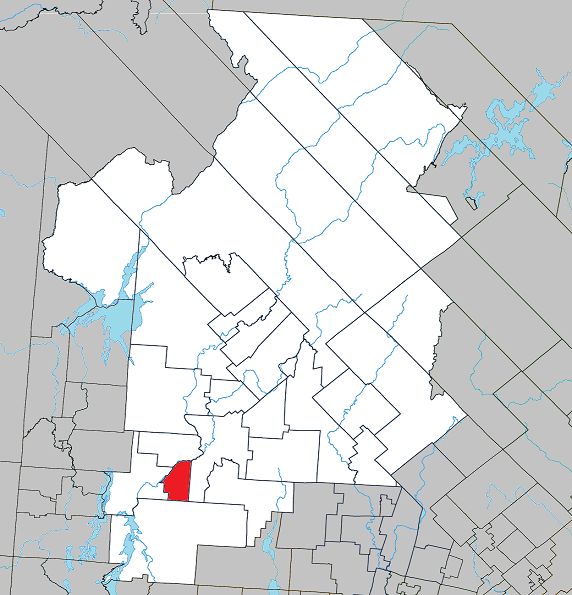
- Location within Antoine-Labelle RCM

- Location in central Quebec
- Coordinates: 46°18′N 75°30′W
- Country: Canada
- Province: Quebec
- Region: Laurentides
- RCM: Antoine-Labelle
- Constituted: January 1, 1955

Government
  - Mayor: Nicolas Pentassuglia
  - Federal riding: Laurentides—Labelle
  - Prov. riding: Labelle

Area
  - Total: 94.38 km^{2} (36.44 sq mi)
  - Land: 71.73 km^{2} (27.70 sq mi)

Population (2021)
  - Total: 445
  - Density: 6.2/km^{2} (16/sq mi)
  - Pop. 2016-2021: ▲2.3%
  - Dwellings: 458
- Time zone: UTC−5 (EST)
  - Summer (DST): UTC−4 (EDT)
- Postal code(s): J0W 1S1
- Area code: 819
- Highways: R-311
- Website: www.lacducerf.ca

Lac-du-Cerf (French pronunciation: [lak dy sɛʁf]) is a municipality in the Laurentides region of Quebec, Canada, part of the Antoine-Labelle Regional County Municipality. It is located on and named after Lac du Cerf (Deer Lake). It is an area of 71.7 sq km, and a low population density 6.2 people per sq kilometer as of data recorded in 2021 (less than the overall population density of Quebec which was recorded as 6.5 in 2021).

The main economic activities are agriculture, forestry, and tourism.

== History ==
At the beginning of the 20th century, the area was still only visited by trappers and log drivers. In 1915, the first 2 settler families arrived and built their homes on the north shore of Petit Lac-du-Cerf (Little Deer Lake). They were followed by more settlers in 1918. In 1919, two bridges were built over the Lièvre River at Île Longue (Long Island), connecting the new settlement to Notre-Dame-de-Pontmain by road.

The place continued to attract more settlers throughout the 1920s and 1930s. In 1939, its post office opened (which closed in 1970).

In January 1955, the Municipality of Lac-du-Cerf was created out of territory ceded from Saint-Aimé-du-Lac-des-Îles and Notre-Dame-de-Pontmain. Its first mayor was Joseph Boismenu, who in 1918, at age 22, moved to Lac-du-Cerf together with his wife.

== Demographics ==
Canada census – Lac-du-Cerf community profile

	2021	2016	2011
Population	445 (+2.3% from 2016)	435 (+4.8% from 2011)	415 (-2.1% from 2006)
Land area	71.73 km^{2} (27.70 sq mi)	73.29 km^{2} (28.30 sq mi)	73.14 km^{2} (28.24 sq mi)
Population density	6.2/km^{2} (16/sq mi)	5.9/km^{2} (15/sq mi)	5.7/km^{2} (15/sq mi)
Median age	62.8 (M: 64.0, F: 62.4)	61.8 (M: 62.1, F: 61.5)	60.0 (M: 60.6, F: 58.8)
Private dwellings	458 (total) 245 (occupied)	466 (total)	479 (total)
Median household income	$50,800	$40,064	$39,527

References: 2021 2016 2011

Historical census populations – Lac-du-Cerf

Year	Pop.	±%
1956	355	—
1961	393	+10.7%
1966	385	−2.0%
1971	372	−3.4%
1976	378	+1.6%
1981	382	+1.1%
1986	371	−2.9%

Year	Pop.	±%
1991	409	+10.2%
1996	425	+3.9%
2001	420	−1.2%
2006	424	+1.0%
2011	415	−2.1%
2016	435	+4.8%
2021	445	+2.3%

Source: Statistics Canada

Private dwellings occupied by usual residents: 245 (total dwellings: 458)

Mother tongue:

- English as first language: 3.4%
- French as first language: 96.6%
- English and French as first language: 1.1%
- Other as first language: 1.1%

== Government ==
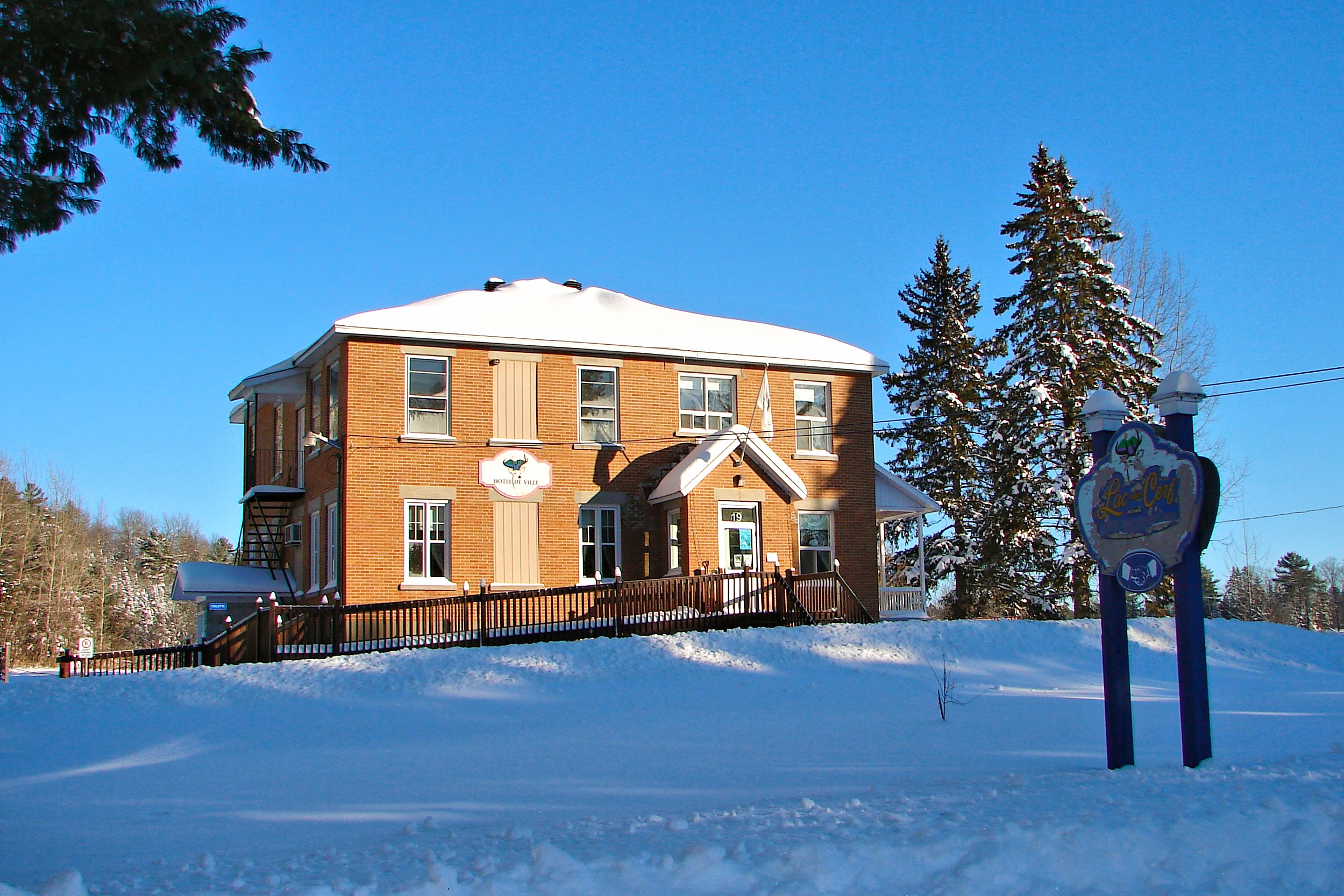
Municipal Hall of Lac-du-Cerf

List of former mayors:

- Joseph Boismenu (1955–1956, 1959–1960)
- Patrice Bondu (1956–1958)
- Gerald Ouimet (1961–1962)
- Henri Filion (1963–1964)
- Gerard Boismenu (1965–1971)
- Raymond Charbonneau (1971–1973)
- Mario Bondu (1973–...)
- Denis Simard (...–2009)
- Pauline Ouimet (2009–2013)
- Danielle Ouimet (2013–2021)
- Nicolas Pentassuglia (2021–present)

== See also ==
- List of municipalities in Quebec
