= Catherine Drouin =

Catherine Drouin MNA

Member of the National Assembly for Labelle
- Incumbent
- Assumed office October 5, 2026
- Preceded by: Chantale Jeannotte

Personal details
- Party: Parti Québécois

Catherine Drouin is a Canadian politician who is a candidate for the National Assembly of Quebec for Labelle in the 2026 Quebec general election as a member of the Parti Québécois.

Drouin is a graduate of the École nationale d'administration publique. While completing her degree, she also served as a councillor in Mont-Tremblant.
