= Sylvain Pagé =

Canadian businessman and politician

Member of the National Assembly of Quebec for Labelle
- In office October 1, 2001 – October 1, 2018
- Preceded by: Jacques Léonard
- Succeeded by: Chantale Jeannotte

Personal details
- Born: January 9, 1961 (age 65) Mont-Laurier, Quebec, Canada
- Party: Parti Québécois
- Education: HEC Montreal

Sylvain Pagé (born January 9, 1961) is a Canadian businessman and politician. Pagé is the former Member of National Assembly of Quebec for the riding of Labelle in the Laurentians, elected in 2001. He is a member of the Parti Québécois.

Born in Mont-Laurier, Quebec, Pagé received a certificate in business management at HEC Montréal in 1980. He was the founder of Boutique Plein Air and worked for 17 years for that company. He was also an insurance broker in the Outaouais region.

Pagé was a chair of the OUI mouvement in the 1980 referendum on sovereignty. He was also a board member of the Mont-Laurier business association and a columnist for CFLO-FM. He also acted in a production of 12 Hommes en colère in 2004 and was the regional chair of the United Way campaign in 2005.

Pagé was elected in a by-election in 2001 and named the parliamentary secretary to the Minister of Youth, Tourism, Recreation and Sport from 2001 to 2003. He was re-elected in 2003 and was the critic in regions, sport, and recreation. He was re-elected in 2007 and became the critic for wildlife, parks, and tourism.
