= La Conception =

- Municipality
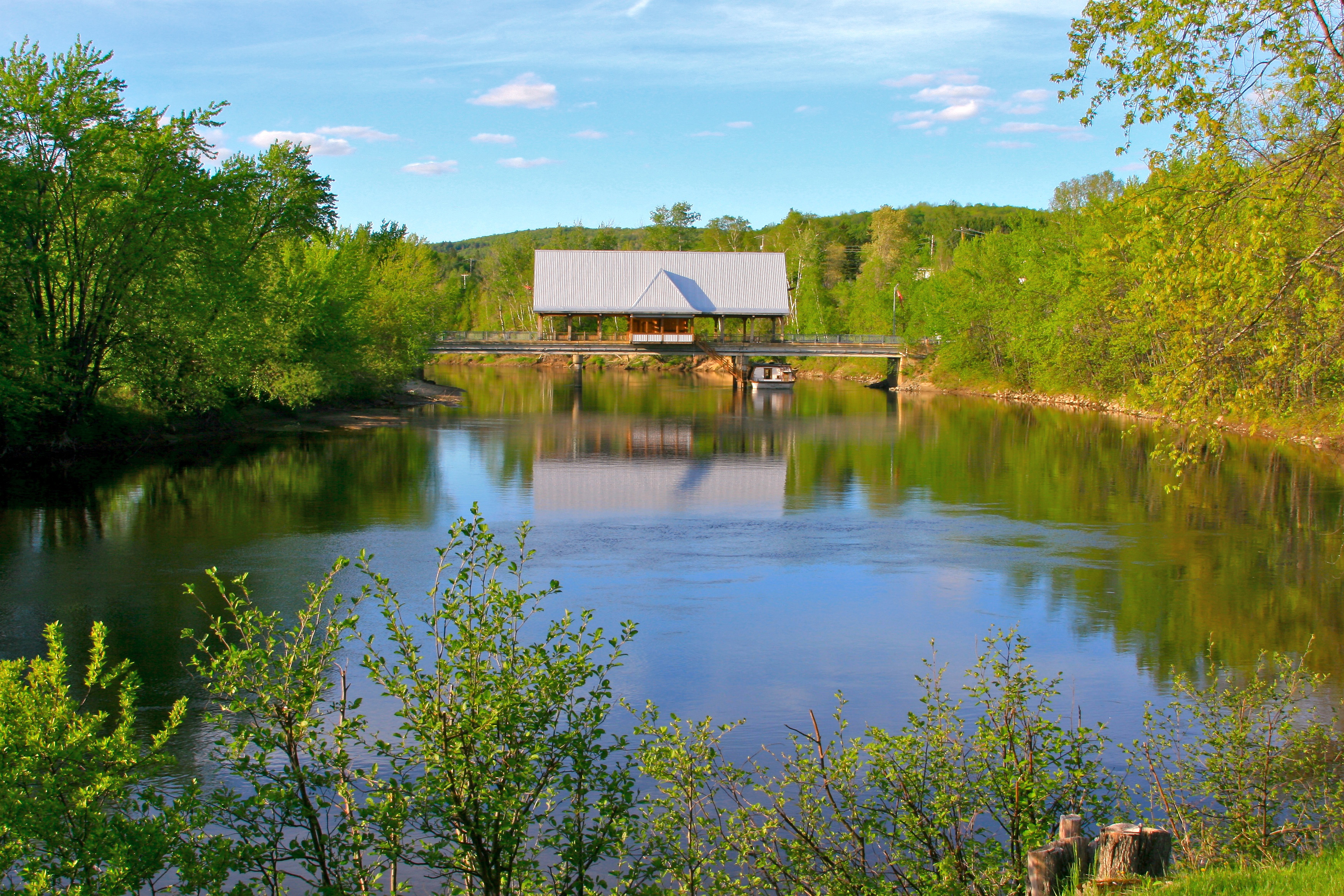
- Village of La Conception
- Motto: La nature... paisible
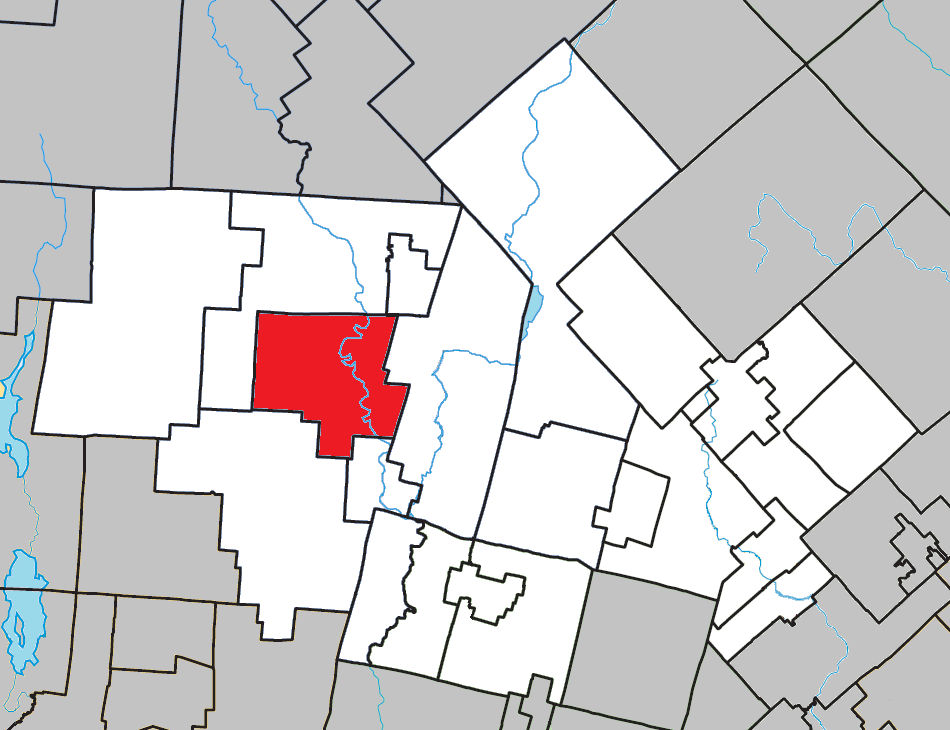
- Location within Les Laurentides RCM

- Location in central Quebec
- Coordinates: 46°09′N 74°42′W
- Country: Canada
- Province: Quebec
- Region: Laurentides
- RCM: Les Laurentides
- Settled: 1880
- Constituted: January 1, 1882

Government
  - Mayor: Gaétan Castilloux
  - Fed. riding: Laurentides—Labelle
  - Prov. riding: Labelle

Area
  - Total: 141.24 km^{2} (54.53 sq mi)
  - Land: 127.37 km^{2} (49.18 sq mi)

Population (2021)
  - Total: 1,527
  - Density: 12/km^{2} (31/sq mi)
  - Change 2016-21: ▲14.2%
  - Dwellings: 1,229
- Time zone: UTC−5 (EST)
  - Summer (DST): UTC−4 (EDT)
- Postal code(s): J0T 1M0
- Area code: 819
- Highways: R-117 (TCH)
- Website: www.municipalite.laconception.qc.ca

La Conception (French pronunciation: [la kɔ̃sɛpsjɔ̃]) is a village and municipality in the Laurentides region of Quebec, Canada, part of the Les Laurentides Regional County Municipality. It is located along the Rouge River.

== History ==
Logging and some agriculture began in the area in the early 19th century, but settlement followed in the 1870s as part of Antoine Labelle's push to colonize the Laurentians. Labelle founded the Immaculate Conception Mission (later shortened to La Conception), named in line with the practice of that time to name parishes after doctrines related to Mary or Jesus. By 1880, there was a post office and railway station. On January 1, 1882, the place was incorporated as the Township Municipality of Clyde, named after the River Clyde in Scotland.

In 1893, the railway was completed, giving the place a development boost since the only way to reach La Conception was via the Rouge River. It led to the expansion of sawmills and tourism in the area.

In 1946, the township was renamed to La Conception. In 1948, the highway, Route 11 (now Route 117), reached reached La Conception.

== Demographics ==
Historical census populations – La Conception

Year	Pop.	±%
1891	736	—
1901	519	−29.5%
1911	641	+23.5%
1921	602	−6.1%
1931	628	+4.3%
1941	629	+0.2%
1951	631	+0.3%

Year	Pop.	±%
1956	595	−5.7%
1961	541	−9.1%
1966	488	−9.8%
1971	546	+11.9%
1976	535	−2.0%
1981	646	+20.7%
1986	664	+2.8%

Year	Pop.	±%
1991	745	+12.2%
1996	917	+23.1%
2001	1,050	+14.5%
2006	1,283	+22.2%
2011	1,287	+0.3%
2016	1,337	+3.9%
2021	1,527	+14.2%

Source: Statistics Canada

Private dwellings occupied by usual residents (2021): 743 (total dwellings: 1229)

Mother tongue (2021):

- English as first language: 6.5%
- French as first language: 89.9%
- English and French as first languages: 0.7%
- Other as first language: 2.3%

== Local government ==
List of former mayors:

- Zéphirin Godin (1883–1888, 1900–1901)
- François Xavier Clément (1888–1893)
- Alphonse Leclerc (1893–1894)
- Patrick Alary (1894–1898)
- Moyse Labrosse (1898–1900)
- Magloire Gauthier (1901–1903, 1904)
- Jean Papineau (1903–1904, 1910–1916, 1923–1934)
- Stanislas Clément (1904–1906)
- Joseph Dubé (1906–1910)
- Bénoni Saint-Jean (1916–1921)
- Augustin Campeau (1921–1923)
- Louis Valiquette (1934–1937, 1941–1945)
- Damas Wilfrid Brazeau (1937–1939)
- Joseph Oswald Bessette (1939–1941, 1945–1947)
- Alphonse Labelle (1947–1949)
- Joseph Saindon (1949–1950, 1951–1955, 1958–1962)
- Charles Giroux (1950–1951)
- Rosario Jacques (1955)
- Omer Perreault (1955–1958, 1962–1967, 1971–1975)
- Héliodore Barbe (1967–1971, 1975–1983)
- Barbara Anne Coron (1983–1989)
- Roger Lacasse (1989)
- Roger Panneton (1989–1993)
- Louise Corbeil (1993–2001)
- Gilles Bélanger (2001–2009)
- Maurice Plouffe (2009–2021)
- Gaétan Castilloux (2021–present)

== Education ==
Sainte Agathe Academy (of the Sir Wilfrid Laurier School Board) in Sainte-Agathe-des-Monts serves English-speaking students in this community for both elementary and secondary levels.
