= Chute-Saint-Philippe =

- Municipality
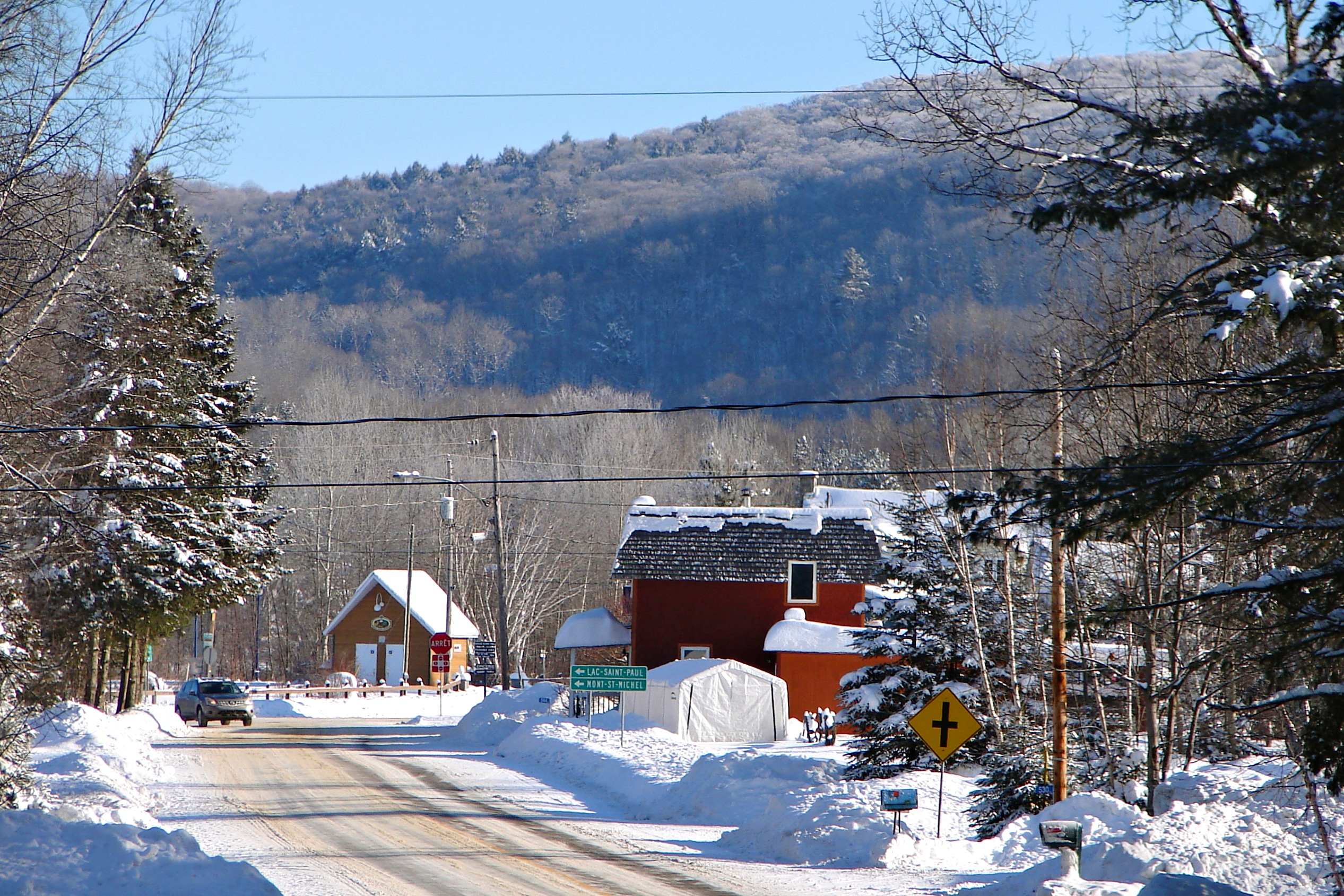

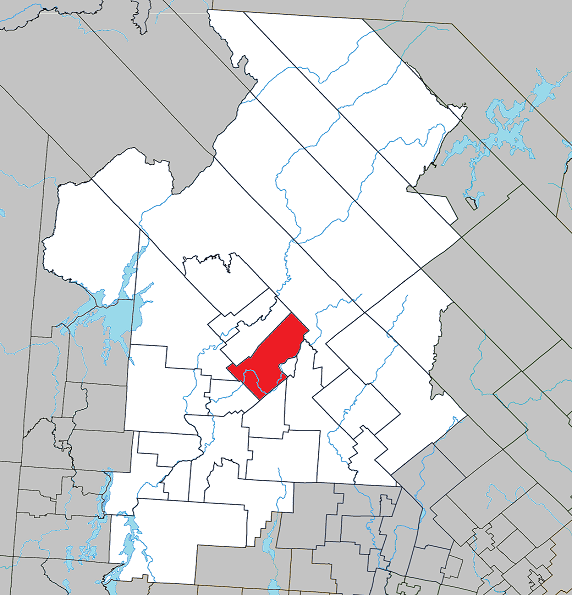
- Location within Antoine-Labelle RCM

- Location in central Quebec
- Coordinates: 46°39′N 75°14′W
- Country: Canada
- Province: Quebec
- Region: Laurentides
- RCM: Antoine-Labelle
- Constituted: October 26, 1940
- Named for: Philip the Apostle

Government
  - Mayor: Normand St-Amour
  - Federal riding: Laurentides—Labelle
  - Prov. riding: Labelle

Area
  - Total: 322.00 km^{2} (124.32 sq mi)
  - Land: 298.64 km^{2} (115.31 sq mi)

Population (2021)
  - Total: 1,039
  - Density: 3.5/km^{2} (9.1/sq mi)
  - Pop. (2016-21): ▲10.3%
  - Dwellings: 876
- Time zone: UTC−5 (EST)
  - Summer (DST): UTC−4 (EDT)
- Postal code(s): J0W 1A0
- Area code: 819
- Highways: R-311
- Website: www.chute-saint-philippe.ca

Chute-Saint-Philippe (French pronunciation: [ʃyt sɛ̃ filip]) is a municipality in the Laurentides region of Quebec, Canada, part of the Antoine-Labelle Regional County Municipality.

The village is located in a fairly flat valley surrounded by a mountainous area of the Laurentian Hills that are dominated by mixed forest.

== History ==
The settlement initially had the name Chute-Leon at the beginning of the 20th century, in memory of Pope Leo XIII (1810-1903), and was called Victoria Falls by 1903, in honour of Queen Victoria (1819-1901).

In 1921, a mission was founded here with Philip the Apostle as its patron saint. In 1934, the local post office was renamed to Chute-Saint-Philippe, taking its name from a drop on the Kiamika River and the patron saint. On December 26, 1940, the Municipality of Chute St-Philippe was formed out of territory ceded from Ferme-Neuve and an adjacent unorganized territory. In 1969, the orthography was adjusted to Chute-Saint-Philippe.

In 1966, the mission received its status as a parish.

== Geography ==
The municipality is located on the western shore of Petit Lac Kiamika, a widening of the Kiamika River. This tributary of the Lièvre River meanders from east to west in the southwestern part of the municipality.

== Demographics ==
In the 2021 Census of Population conducted by Statistics Canada, Chute-Saint-Philippe had a population of 1,039 living in 513 of its 876 total private dwellings, a change of 10.3% from its 2016 population of 942. With a land area of 298.64 km^{2} (115.31 sq mi), it had a population density of 3.5/km^{2} (9.0/sq mi) in 2021.

Historical census populations – Chute-Saint-Philippe

Year	Pop.	±%
1941	467	—
1951	447	−4.3%
1956	391	−12.5%
1961	390	−0.3%
1966	368	−5.6%
1971	411	+11.7%
1976	453	+10.2%
1981	610	+34.7%

Year	Pop.	±%
1986	602	−1.3%
1991	698	+15.9%
1996	778	+11.5%
2001	823	+5.8%
2006	890	+8.1%
2011	892	+0.2%
2016	942	+5.6%
2021	1,039	+10.3%

Source: Statistics Canada

Mother tongue (2021):

- English as first language: 1.9%
- French as first language: 95.2%
- English and French as first language: 1.4%
- Other as first language: 1.4%

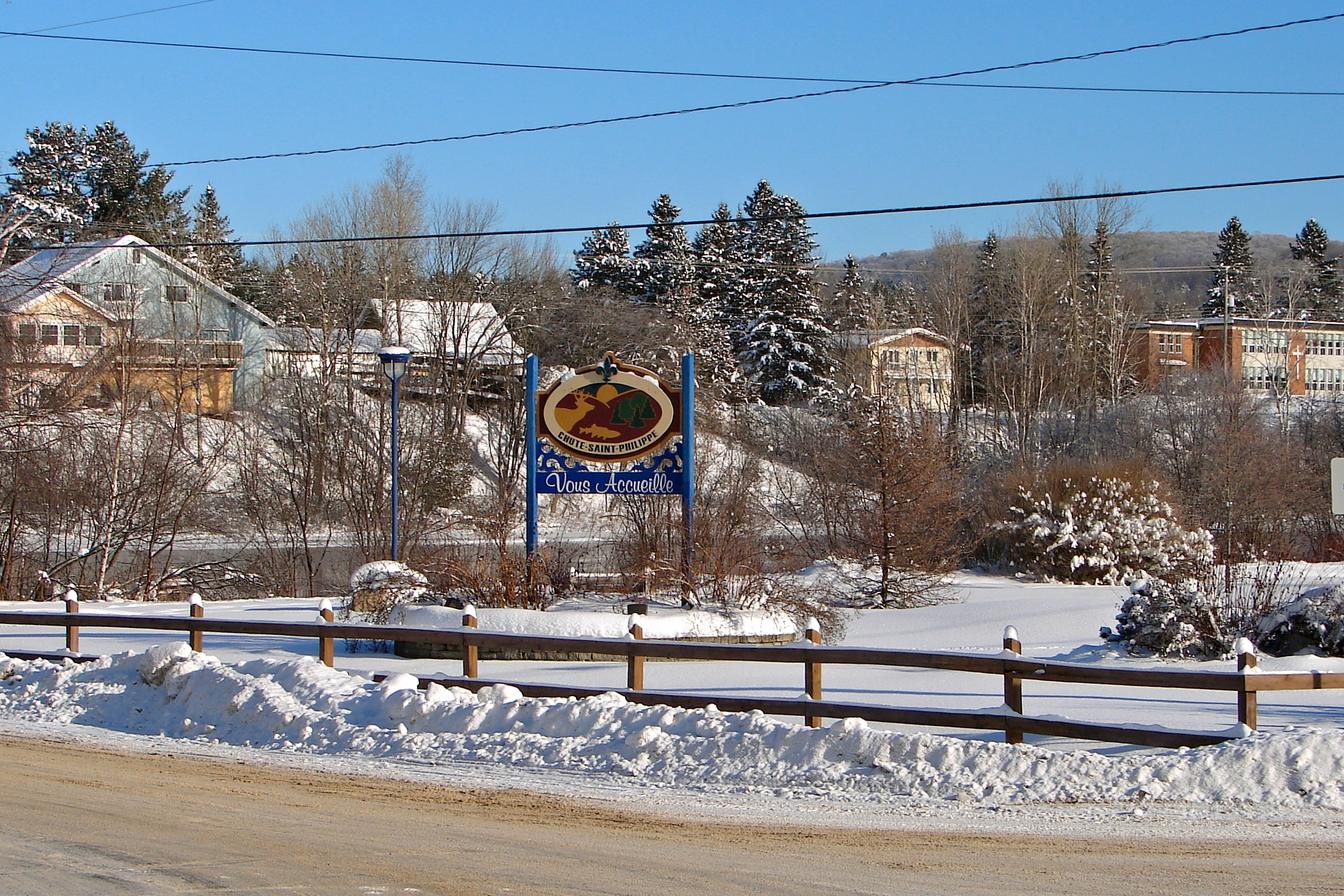
Village center

== Government ==
Chute-Saint-Philippe forms part of the federal electoral district of Laurentides—Labelle and has been represented by Marie-Hélène Gaudreau of the Bloc Québécois since 2019. Provincially, Chute-Saint-Philippe is part of the Labelle electoral district and is represented by Chantale Jeannotte of the Coalition Avenir Québec since 2018.

Chute-Saint-Philippe federal election results
Year	Liberal		Conservative		Bloc Québécois		New Democratic		Green	
2021	19%	115	16%	94	55%	327	3%	19	2%	10
2019	31%	167	8%	42	52%	276	5%	27	3%	16
2015	28%	121	10%	45	32%	136	29%	124	1%	4
2011	9%	40	8%	36	38%	168	43%	190	2%	10
2008	27%	104	14%	54	49%	192	7%	30	2%	8
2006	10%	44	23%	100	58%	257	5%	20	4%	19
2004	24%	109	12%	52	61%	273	1%	6	1%	6

Chute-Saint-Philippe provincial election results
Year	CAQ		Liberal		QC solidaire		Parti Québécois	
2022	56%	180	4%	14	16%	50	14%	45
2018	37%	221	9%	52	13%	79	38%	228
2014	23%	144	22%	135	8%	51	45%	281
2012	22%	115	12%	67	13%	66	50%	263

List of former mayors:

- Heni Jolicoeur (1941–1967)
- Arnold Michaudville (1967–1971)
- Jean-Pierre Jolicoeur (1971–1973)
- Georges Bélec (1973–1975)
- Fernand Prud'Homme (1975–1978)
- Jacques Perras (1978–1981)
- Francine Bélec (interim 1981)
- Jean-Pierre Jolicoeur (1981–1995)
- Henriette Lachaine (1995–1997)
- Jean-Jacques Paquette (1997–2005)
- Claude Blain (2005–2009)
- Normand St-Amour (2009–present)

== See also ==
- List of municipalities in Quebec
