= Lac-Ernest =

- Unorganized territory
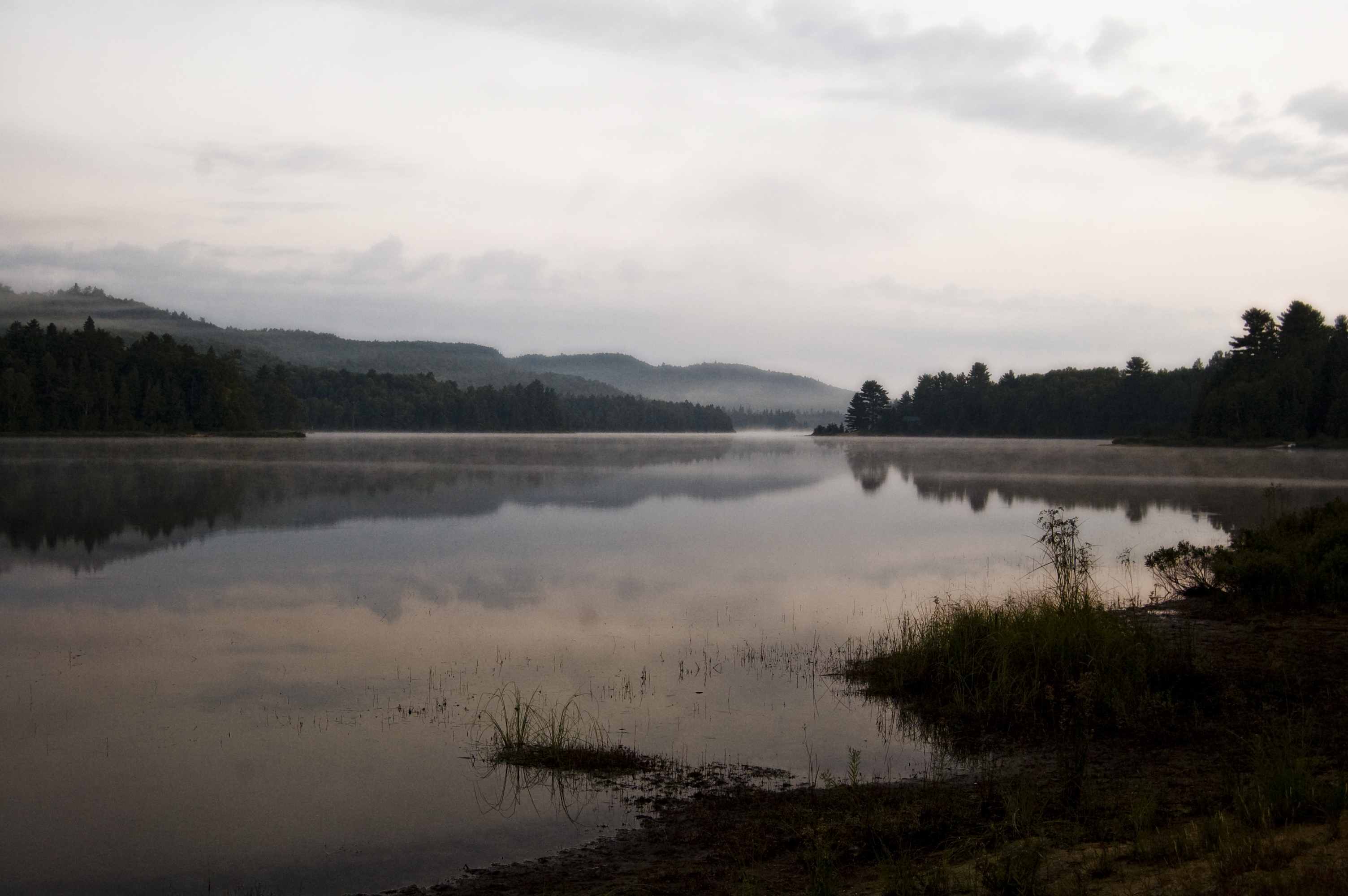
- Ernest Lake at dawn

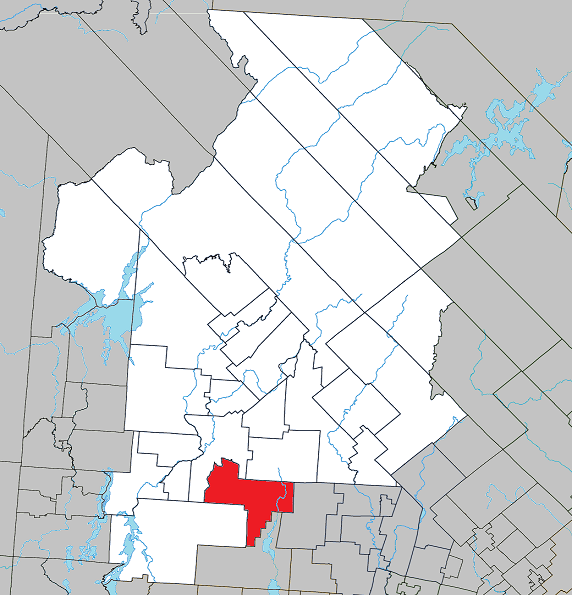
- Location within Antoine-Labelle RCM.

- Location in central Quebec.
- Coordinates: 46°11′N 75°12′W
- Country: Canada
- Province: Quebec
- Region: Laurentides
- RCM: Antoine-Labelle
- Constituted: January 1, 1986

Government
  - Federal riding: Laurentides—Labelle
  - Prov. riding: Labelle

Area
  - Total: 381.50 km^{2} (147.30 sq mi)
  - Land: 343.36 km^{2} (132.57 sq mi)

Population (2011)
  - Total: 0
  - Density: 0/km^{2} (0/sq mi)
  - Pop 2006-2011: 0.0%
  - Dwellings: 0
- Time zone: UTC−5 (EST)
  - Summer (DST): UTC−4 (EDT)
- Highways: No major routes

Lac-Ernest is an unorganized territory in the Laurentides region of Quebec, Canada. It is almost entirely within the Papineau-Labelle Wildlife Reserve.

== History ==
In the early 1920s, the Singer Company, manufacturer best known for its sewing machines, began logging the area. This company built a railway from Thurso to southern Lake Montjoie in Lac-Ernest territory. Here a vast logging camp, known as "Camp 27", was established where logs were accumulated as far as the eye could see. In 1964, the MacLaren Company succeeded Singer and used the railroad until 1980 when it was dismantled and now functions as a rail trail.

== Demographics ==
Population trend:

- Population in 2011: 0
- Population in 2006: 0
- Population in 2001: 0
- Population in 1996: 0
- Population in 1991: 0

== See also ==
- List of unorganized territories in Quebec
