= Lac-Saguay =

- Village municipality
- Lac-Saguay in 2026

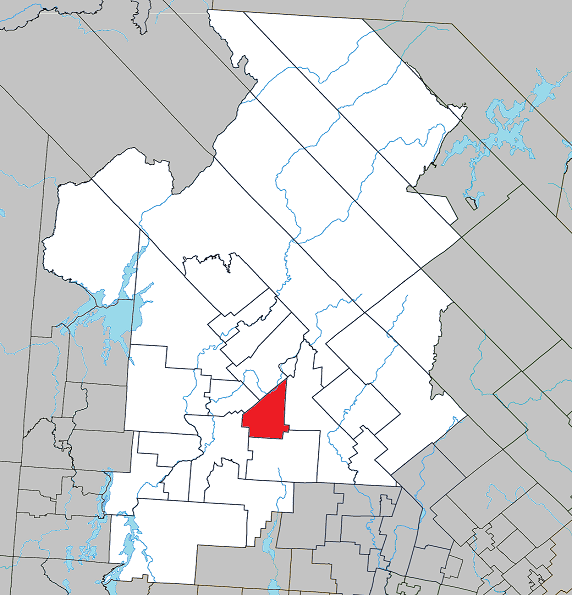
- Location within Antoine-Labelle RCM

- Location in central Quebec
- Coordinates: 46°30′N 75°09′W
- Country: Canada
- Province: Quebec
- Region: Laurentides
- RCM: Antoine-Labelle
- Constituted: July 1, 1951

Government
  - Mayor: Michel Chouinard
  - Federal riding: Laurentides—Labelle
  - Prov. riding: Labelle

Area
  - Total: 185.18 km^{2} (71.50 sq mi)
  - Land: 171.88 km^{2} (66.36 sq mi)

Population (2021)
  - Total: 526
  - Density: 3.1/km^{2} (8.0/sq mi)
  - Pop. (2016-21): ▲14.6%
  - Dwellings: 447
- Time zone: UTC−5 (EST)
  - Summer (DST): UTC−4 (EDT)
- Postal code(s): J0W 1L0
- Area code: 819
- Highways: R-117 (TCH)
- Website: www.lacsaguay.qc.ca

Lac-Saguay is a village municipality in Antoine-Labelle Regional County Municipality in the Laurentides region of Quebec, Canada.

Its economy is centred on tourism, outdoor recreation, hunting, and fishing.

The municipality is named after the adjacent Lake Saguay, which in turn comes from the Algonquin sagwa, meaning "unblock" or "pour". An alternate explanation is that it comes from saki, meaning "river mouth."

== History ==
In 1905, the first settlers arrived when Gouin Road opened that connected Nominingue to Ferme-Neuve via Lac-Saguay.

In 1911, the Township Municipality of Boyer-Partie-Ouest was formed out of previously unorganized area, named after Arthur Boyer. That same year, the Parish of Saint-Hugues-du-Lac-Saguay was founded.

In 1921, the post office opened under the name Lac-Saguay.

On July 1, 1951, Boyer-Partie-Ouest was dissolved and, together with more unorganized territory, reformed into the Township Municipality of Boyer. In 1963, it changed names and status to the Municipality of Saguay, and again in 1985 to the Village Municipality of Lac-Saguay.

== Demographics ==
In the 2021 Census of Population conducted by Statistics Canada, Lac-Saguay had a population of 526 living in 280 of its 447 total private dwellings, a change of 14.6% from its 2016 population of 459. With a land area of 171.88 km^{2} (66.36 sq mi), it had a population density of 3.1/km^{2} (7.9/sq mi) in 2021.

Canada census – Lac-Saguay community profile

	2021	2016	2011
Population	526 (+14.6% from 2016)	459 (+2.9% from 2011)	446 (-9.3% from 2006)
Land area	171.88 km^{2} (66.36 sq mi)	172.97 km^{2} (66.78 sq mi)	172.66 km^{2} (66.66 sq mi)
Population density	3.1/km^{2} (8.0/sq mi)	2.7/km^{2} (7.0/sq mi)	2.6/km^{2} (6.7/sq mi)
Median age	60.8 (M: 61.2, F: 60.8)	58.1 (M: 59.1, F: 57.2)	55.8 (M: 56.3, F: 55.2)
Private dwellings	447 (total) 280 (occupied)	457 (total)	445 (total)
Median household income	$57,600	$43,456	$40,301

References: 2021 2016 2011

Historical census populations – Lac-Saguay

Year	Pop.	±%
1956	253	—
1961	249	−1.6%
1966	214	−14.1%
1971	276	+29.0%
1976	264	−4.3%
1981	293	+11.0%
1986	301	+2.7%

Year	Pop.	±%
1991	305	+1.3%
1996	318	+4.3%
2001	382	+20.1%
2006	492	+28.8%
2011	446	−9.3%
2016	459	+2.9%
2021	526	+14.6%

Source: Statistics Canada

Mother tongue (2021):

- English as first language: 3.8%
- French as first language: 94.3%
- English and French as first language: 0%
- Other as first language: 1.9%

== Government ==
Lac-Saguay forms part of the federal electoral district of Laurentides—Labelle and has been represented by Marie-Hélène Gaudreau of the Bloc Québécois since 2019. Provincially, Lac-Saguay is part of the Labelle electoral district and is represented by Chantale Jeannotte of the Coalition Avenir Québec since 2018.

Lac-Saguay federal election results
Year	Liberal		Conservative		Bloc Québécois		New Democratic		Green	
2021	27%	100	10%	36	57%	212	2%	6	3%	10
2019	32%	110	8%	27	52%	181	5%	18	2%	5
2015	36%	91	9%	23	27%	68	26%	66	2%	5
2011	13%	32	6%	15	38%	93	42%	103	2%	5
2008	30%	72	9%	21	55%	131	5%	11	2%	5
2006	12%	26	22%	47	60%	127	4%	8	2%	5
2004	27%	51	5%	9	64%	121	2%	4	2%	4

Lac-Saguay provincial election results
Year	CAQ		Liberal		QC solidaire		Parti Québécois	
2022	43%	74	6%	11	14%	24	18%	32
2018	41%	124	8%	23	15%	46	33%	102
2014	22%	175	22%	172	7%	22	48%	159
2012	25%	69	15%	40	6%	15	51%	139

List of former mayors:

- Francine Asselin-Bélisle (...–2021)
- Michel Chouinard (2021–present)

== See also ==
- List of village municipalities in Quebec
