= Lac-Marguerite =

- Unorganized territory
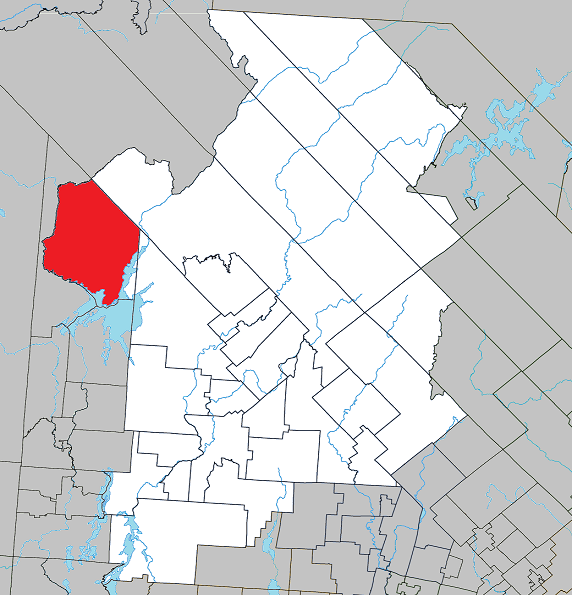
- Location within Antoine-Labelle RCM.

- Location in central Quebec.
- Coordinates: 47°02′N 75°48′W
- Country: Canada
- Province: Quebec
- Region: Laurentides
- RCM: Antoine-Labelle
- Constituted: January 1, 1986

Government
  - Federal riding: Laurentides—Labelle
  - Prov. riding: Labelle

Area
  - Total: 923.00 km^{2} (356.37 sq mi)
  - Land: 818.74 km^{2} (316.12 sq mi)

Population (2011)
  - Total: 0
  - Density: 0/km^{2} (0/sq mi)
  - Pop 2006-2011: 0.0%
  - Dwellings: 0
- Time zone: UTC−5 (EST)
  - Summer (DST): UTC−4 (EDT)
- Highways: No major routes

Lac-Marguerite (French pronunciation: [lak maʁɡəʁit]) is an unorganized territory in Antoine-Labelle Regional County Municipality in the Laurentides region of Quebec, Canada.

== Demographics ==
Population trend:

- Population in 2011: 0
- Population in 2006: 0
- Population in 2001: 0
- Population in 1996: 0
- Population in 1991: 0

== See also ==
- List of unorganized territories in Quebec
