= Baie-des-Chaloupes =

- Unorganized territory
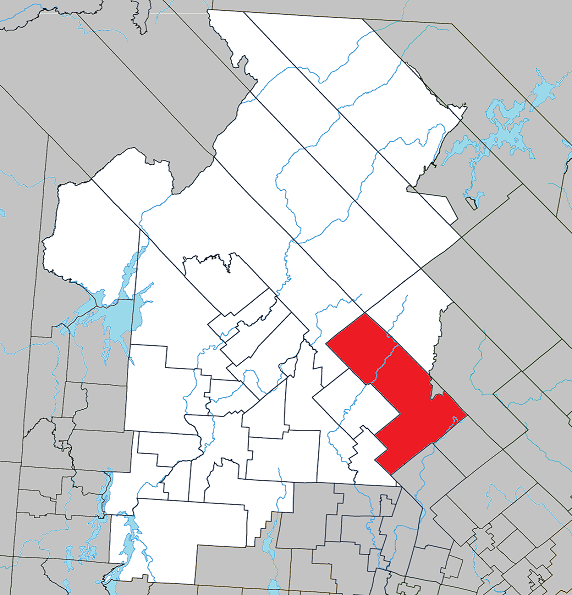
- Location within Antoine-Labelle RCM

- Location in central Quebec
- Coordinates: 46°35′N 74°32′W
- Country: Canada
- Province: Quebec
- Region: Laurentides
- RCM: Antoine-Labelle
- Constituted: January 1, 1986

Government
  - Federal riding: Laurentides—Labelle
  - Prov. riding: Labelle

Area
  - Total: 956.82 km^{2} (369.43 sq mi)
  - Land: 890.15 km^{2} (343.69 sq mi)

Population (2021)
  - Total: 0
  - Density: 0/km^{2} (0/sq mi)
  - Pop (2016-21): 0.0%
  - Dwellings: 0
- Time zone: UTC−5 (EST)
  - Summer (DST): UTC−4 (EDT)
- Highways: No major routes

Baie-des-Chaloupes (French pronunciation: [bɛ de ʃalup], meaning "Bay of [boat-]launches") is an unorganized territory of Quebec located in the regional county municipality of Antoine-Labelle, in Laurentides, Quebec, Canada. The territory, covering a land area of about 900 km, is named after a bay in Lake Cinq-Doigts.

== History ==
This unorganized territory was created on January 1, 1981 by the Government of Quebec.

== Demographics ==
Historical census populations – Baie-des-Chaloupes

Year	Pop.	±%
1991	4	—
1996	0	−100.0%
2001	0	0.00%
2006	0	0.00%

Year	Pop.	±%
2011	0	0.00%
2016	0	0.00%
2021	0	0.00%

Source: Statistics Canada

== See also ==
- List of unorganized territories in Quebec
