= Lac-Saint-Paul, Quebec =

Lac-Saint-Paul
- Municipality
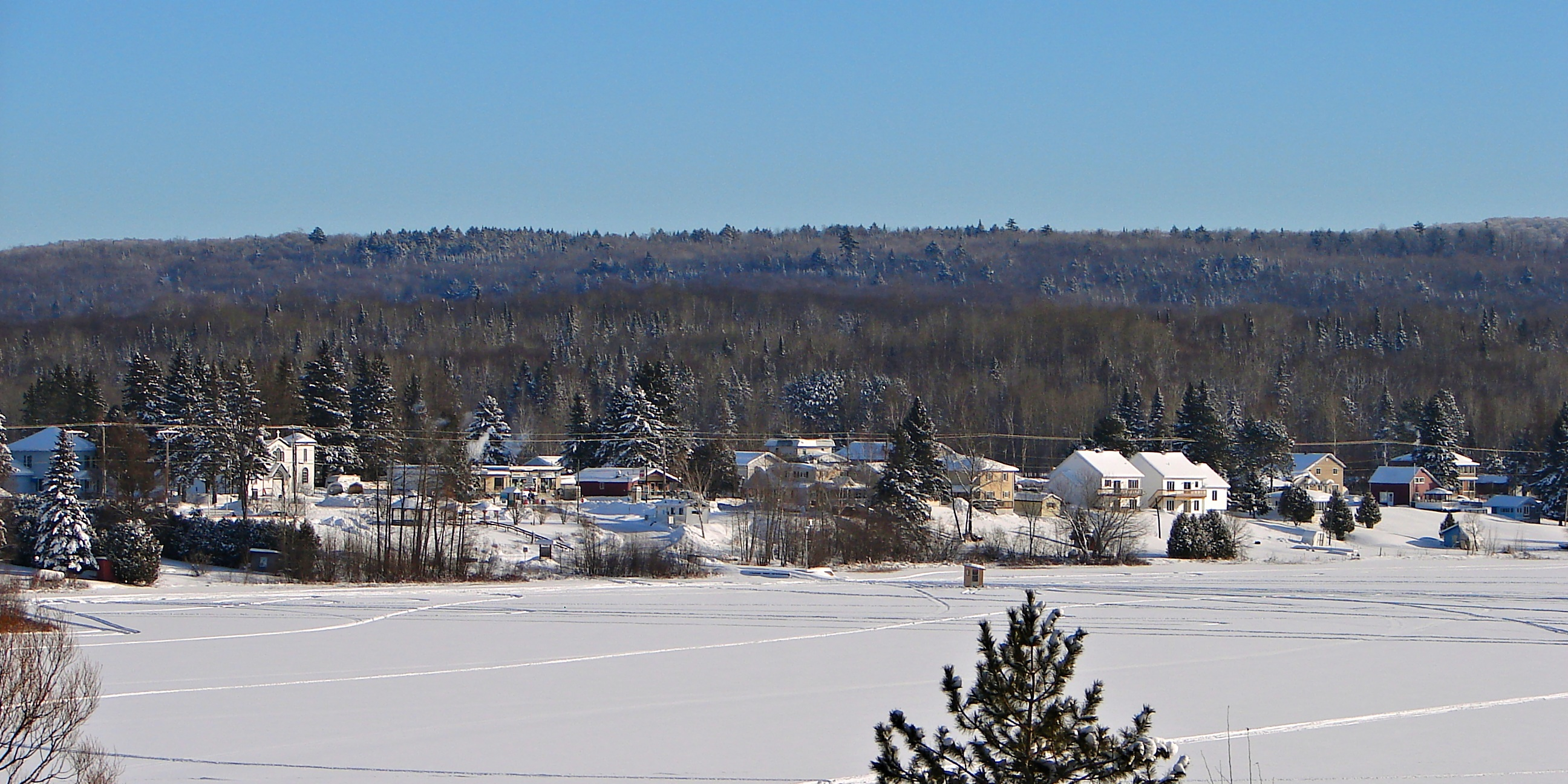

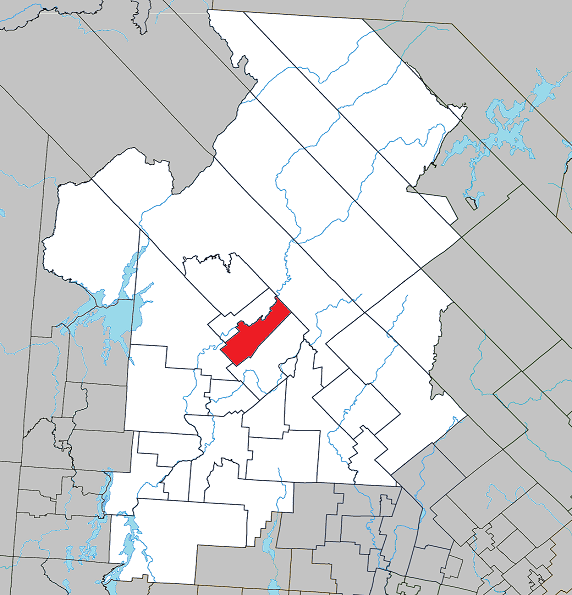
- Location within Antoine-Labelle RCM

- Location in central Quebec
- Coordinates: 46°44′N 75°19′W
- Country: Canada
- Province: Quebec
- Region: Laurentides
- RCM: Antoine-Labelle
- Constituted: September 11, 1922

Government
  - Mayor: Colette Quevillon
  - Federal riding: Laurentides—Labelle
  - Prov. riding: Labelle

Area
  - Total: 185.31 km^{2} (71.55 sq mi)
  - Land: 170.72 km^{2} (65.92 sq mi)

Population (2021)
  - Total: 525
  - Density: 3.1/km^{2} (8.0/sq mi)
  - Pop. 2016-2021: ▲9.1%
  - Dwellings: 423
- Time zone: UTC−5 (EST)
  - Summer (DST): UTC−4 (EDT)
- Postal code(s): J0W 1K0
- Area code: 819
- Highways: R-311
- Website: www.lac-saint-paul.ca

Lac-Saint-Paul (French pronunciation: [lak sɛ̃ pɔl]) is a municipality in the Laurentides region of Quebec, Canada, part of the Antoine-Labelle Regional County Municipality.

== History ==
The first settler was Joseph Dufour, followed by more families in 1898. In 1915, its post office opened under the name Lac Gorman, after the lake the settlement was located on. In 1919, the local parish was founded, named in honour of its patron, Saint Paul. That same year, the lake and post office were renamed to Lac Saint-Paul.

In 1922, the Municipality of Lac-Saint-Paul was created out of territory ceded from the United Township Municipality of Wurtele, Moreau et Gravel.

== Demographics ==
Canada census – Lac-Saint-Paul community profile

	2021	2016
Population	525 (+9.1% from 2016)	481 (0.0% from 2011)
Land area	170.72 km^{2} (65.92 sq mi)	171.57 km^{2} (66.24 sq mi)
Population density	3.1/km^{2} (8.0/sq mi)	2.8/km^{2} (7.3/sq mi)
Median age	59.2 (M: 60.0, F: 58.8)	57.3 (M: 58.7, F: 56.1)
Private dwellings	423 (total) 275 (occupied)	409 (total)
Median household income	$53,200	$46,720

References: 2021 2016

Historical census populations – Lac-Saint-Paul, Quebec

Year	Pop.	±%
1976	288	—
1981	336	+16.7%
1986	391	+16.4%
1991	385	−1.5%
1996	415	+7.8%

Year	Pop.	±%
2001	429	+3.4%
2006	521	+21.4%
2011	481	−7.7%
2016	481	+0.0%
2021	525	+9.1%

Source: Statistics Canada

Private dwellings occupied by usual residents: 275 (total dwellings: 423)

Mother tongue:

- English as first language: 5%
- French as first language: 93%
- English and French as first language: 2%
- Other as first language: 0%

== Local government ==
List of former mayors:

- Jean Coulombe (...–2005)
- Claude Ménard (2005–2013)
- Fabricius Louis Lanzon (2013–2016)
- Normand Marier (2016–2017)
- Colette Quevillon (2017–present)

== See also ==
- List of municipalities in Quebec
