= Lac-Akonapwehikan =

- Unorganized territory
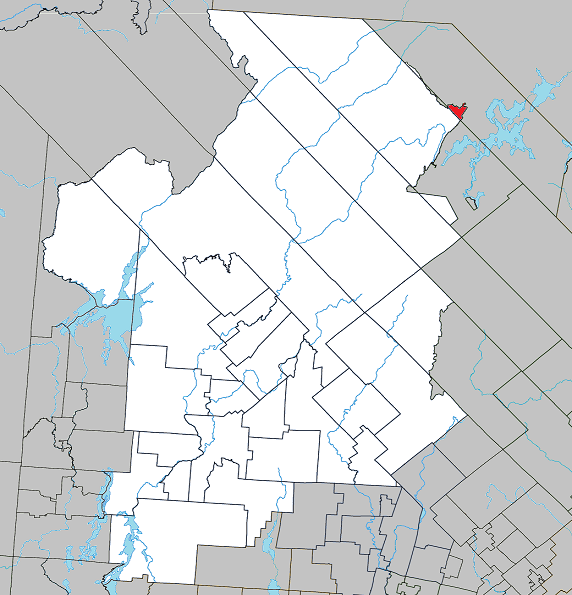
- Location within Antoine-Labelle RCM.

- Location in central Quebec.
- Coordinates: 47°30′N 74°29′W
- Country: Canada
- Province: Quebec
- Region: Laurentides
- RCM: Antoine-Labelle
- Constituted: January 1, 1986

Government
  - Federal riding: Laurentides—Labelle
  - Prov. riding: Labelle

Area
  - Total: 16.50 km^{2} (6.37 sq mi)
  - Land: 7.38 km^{2} (2.85 sq mi)

Population (2011)
  - Total: 0
  - Density: 0/km^{2} (0/sq mi)
  - Pop 2006-2011: 0.0%
  - Dwellings: 0
- Time zone: UTC−5 (EST)
  - Summer (DST): UTC−4 (EDT)
- Highways: No major routes

Lac-Akonapwehikan is an unorganized territory in the Laurentides region of Quebec, Canada, one of the eleven unorganized areas in the Antoine-Labelle Regional County Municipality.

== See also ==
- List of unorganized territories in Quebec
