= Antoine-Labelle Regional County Municipality =

Antoine-Labelle
- Regional county municipality
- Coordinates: 46°53′N 75°20′W
- Country: Canada
- Province: Quebec
- Region: Laurentides
- Effective: January 1, 1983
- County seat: Mont-Laurier

Government
  - Type: Prefecture
  - Prefect: Roger Lapointe

Area
  - Total: 16,229.50 km^{2} (6,266.24 sq mi)
  - Land: 14,976.99 km^{2} (5,782.65 sq mi)

Population (2016)
  - Total: 35,243
  - Density: 2.4/km^{2} (6.2/sq mi)
  - Change 2011-2016: ▲0.2%
  - Dwellings: 23,399
- Time zone: UTC−5 (EST)
  - Summer (DST): UTC−4 (EDT)
- Area code: 819
- Website: www.mrc- antoine-labelle.qc.ca

Antoine-Labelle (French pronunciation: [ɑ̃twan labɛl]) is a regional county municipality located in the Laurentides region of Quebec, Canada. Its seat is Mont-Laurier. It is named for Antoine Labelle.

== Subdivisions ==
There are 28 subdivisions within the RCM:

Cities & Towns (2)

- Mont-Laurier
- Rivière-Rouge

Municipalities (14)

- Chute-Saint-Philippe
- Ferme-Neuve
- Kiamika
- Lac-des-Écorces
- Lac-du-Cerf
- Lac-Saint-Paul
- La Macaza
- L'Ascension
- Mont-Saint-Michel
- Nominingue
- Notre-Dame-de-Pontmain
- Notre-Dame-du-Laus
- Saint-Aimé-du-Lac-des-Îles
- Sainte-Anne-du-Lac

Villages (1)

- Lac-Saguay

Unorganized Territory (11)

- Baie-des-Chaloupes
- Lac-Akonapwehikan
- Lac-Bazinet
- Lac-De La Bidière
- Lac-de-la-Maison-de-Pierre
- Lac-de-la-Pomme
- Lac-Douaire
- Lac-Ernest
- Lac-Marguerite
- Lac-Oscar
- Lac-Wagwabika

== Demographics ==
=== Population ===
Canada census – Antoine-Labelle community profile

	2021	2016	2011
Population	36,462 (+3.5% from 2016)	35,243 (-+0.2% from 2011)	35,159 (+0.5% from 2006)
Land area	14,809.85 km^{2} (5,718.12 sq mi)	14,976.99 km^{2} (5,782.65 sq mi)	14,969.05 km^{2} (5,779.58 sq mi)
Population density	2.5/km^{2} (6.5/sq mi)	2.4/km^{2} (6.2/sq mi)	2.3/km^{2} (6.0/sq mi)
Median age	55.6 (M: 55.6, F: 56.0)	53.0 (M: 52.8, F: 53.2)	49.6 (M: 49.6, F: 49.5)
Private dwellings	23,909 (total) 17,839 (occupied)	23,399 (total)	23,139 (total)
Median household income	$56,800	$46,928	$40,301

References: 2021 2016 2011

Historical Census Data - Antoine-Labelle Regional County Municipality, Quebec

Year	Pop.	±%
1991	32,019	—
1996	33,904	+5.9%
2001	33,456	−1.3%

Year	Pop.	±%
2006	34,999	+4.6%
2011	35,159	+0.5%
2016	35,243	+0.2%

=== Language ===
Canada Census Mother Tongue - Antoine-Labelle Regional County Municipality, Quebec
Census	Total	French			English			French & English			Other		
Year	Responses	Count	Trend	Pop %	Count	Trend	Pop %	Count	Trend	Pop %	Count	Trend	Pop %
2016	34,575	33,630	▲0.1%	97.3%	485	▼2.0%	1.4%	140	▼17.6%	0.4%	320	▲16.4%	0.9%
2011	34,530	33,590	▲0.4%	97.28%	495	▲8.8%	1.43%	170	▲47.8%	0.49%	275	▼47.1%	0.80%
2006	34,535	33,445	▲5.8%	96.84%	455	▲12.3%	1.32%	115	▲21.1%	0.33%	520	▲108.0%	1.51%
2001	32,355	31,605	▼1.6%	97.68%	405	▼2.4%	1.25%	95	▼17.4%	0.29%	250	▲28.2%	0.77%
1996	32,830	32,105	n/a	97.79%	415	n/a	1.26%	115	n/a	0.35%	195	n/a	0.59%

== Transportation ==
=== Access Routes ===
Highways and numbered routes that run through the municipality, including external routes that start or finish at the county border:

- Autoroutes
  - None
- Principal Highways
  - R-107
  - R-117 (TCH)
- Secondary Highways
  - R-309
  - R-311
  - R-321
- External Routes
  - None

=== Airports ===
- Rivière-Rouge/Mont-Tremblant International Airport (La Macaza)
- Aéroport de Mont-Laurier (Mont-Laurier)
- Hydrobase Ste-Véronique (Rivière-Rouge, secteur Sainte-Véronique)

== Protected Areas ==
Mont-Tremblant National Park
Information Centers/ Camp Areas:

- Lac Cache
- Post d'accueil de la Cache

Papineau-Labelle Wildlife Reserve
Information Centers/ Camp Areas:

- Accueil Pie IX
- Benjamin
- Camp de gardien
- Camp du gardien (on Lac Joinville)
- Camp du gardien (on Lac Ernest)
- Caragana
- Corbeau
- De l'Averse
- De l'Hote
- Desaulniers
- Du Sourd
- Entree Benjamin
- Entree Corbeau
- Entree Du Sourd
- Entree Louvigny
- Fascinant
- Flood
- Heron
- Lac-du-Sourd
- Lac-Ernest
- Lac-Joinville
- Lagace
- Leclerc
- Le Mesange/Vieux Foyer
- Letourneau
- Quatre-Temps
- Sept Freres
- Tarte
- Travers
- Wisik/Calliergon/Trille

Rouge-Matawin Wildlife Reserve
Information Centers/ Camp Areas:

- Entree de La Macaza
- Poste d'accueil de La Macaza
- Poste d'accueil de l'Ascension

Zones d'exploitation contrôlée:

- ZEC Le Sueur
- ZEC Mitchinamecus
- ZEC Normandie
- ZEC Petawaga

== Attractions ==
- Armand-Lachaine Covered Bridge [1906] (Chute-Saint-Philippe)
- Exposition de Mont-Laurier Centre (Mont-Laurier)
- Ferme-Rouge Covered Bridge [1903] (Kiamika/Saint-Aimé-du-Lac-des-Îles)
- La Gare Centre of Exposition [1903] (L'Annonciation)
- Macaza Covered Bridge [1904] (La Macaza)
- Mont-Laurier Airport (Des Ruisseaux)
- P'tit-train du Nord trail

== See also ==
=== Related articles ===
- List of regional county municipalities and equivalent territories in Quebec
- Rouge-Matawin Wildlife Reserve
- Mont-Tremblant National Park
- Rouge River (Quebec)
