= Saint-Aimé-du-Lac-des-Îles =

- Municipality
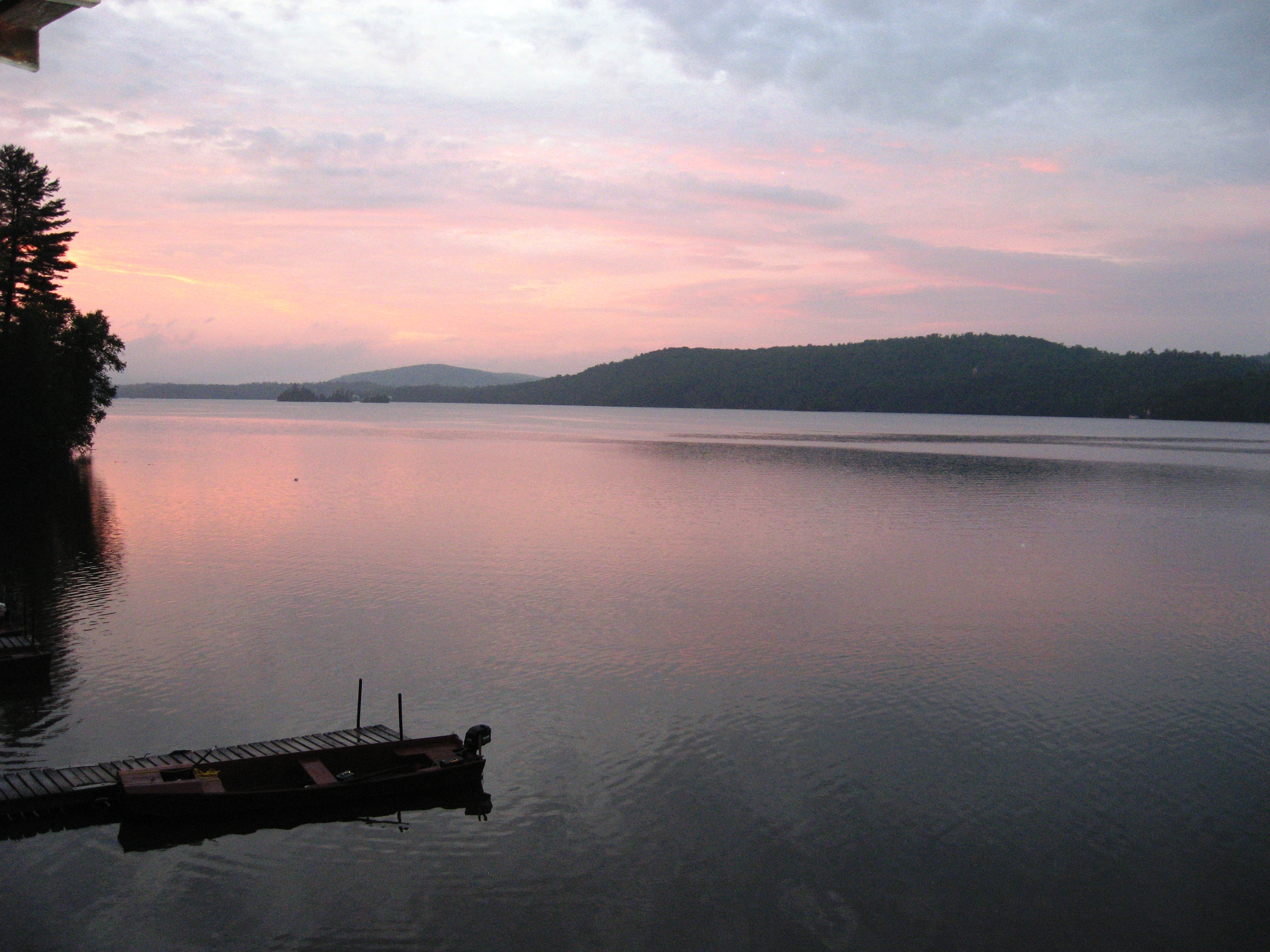
- Lac des Îles

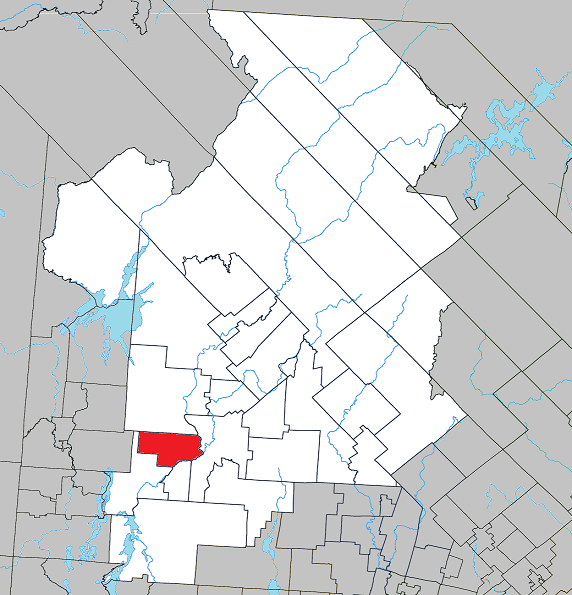
- Location within Antoine-Labelle RCM

- Location in central Quebec
- Coordinates: 46°24′N 75°32′W
- Country: Canada
- Province: Quebec
- Region: Laurentides
- RCM: Antoine-Labelle
- Settled: 1890s
- Constituted: January 1, 2006

Government
  - Mayor: Luc Diotte
  - Federal riding: Laurentides—Labelle
  - Prov. riding: Labelle

Area
  - Total: 181.93 km^{2} (70.24 sq mi)
  - Land: 161.61 km^{2} (62.40 sq mi)

Population (2021)
  - Total: 815
  - Density: 5/km^{2} (13/sq mi)
  - Pop. 2016-2021: ▲3.2%
  - Dwellings: 481
- Time zone: UTC−5 (EST)
  - Summer (DST): UTC−4 (EDT)
- Postal code(s): J0W 1J0
- Area code: 819
- Highways: R-309
- Website: www.saint-aime-du-lac-des-iles.ca

Saint-Aimé-du-Lac-des-Îles (French pronunciation: [sɛ̃t‿ɛme dy lak dez‿il]) is a municipality in the Laurentides region of Quebec, Canada, part of the Antoine-Labelle Regional County Municipality.

The village itself is located just off Quebec Route 309 at the southern end of Lake of Islands (Lac des Îles).

== History ==
In 1891, the parish of Saint-Aimé-du-Lac was founded. In 1907, the post office opened, named Lac-des-Îles after the nearby Lake of Islands (Lac des Îles).

In 1917, the municipality was formed as the United Township Municipality of Wabassee-Dudley-et-Bouthillier-Partie-Nord-Est, and renamed in 1942 to Dudley-et-Bouthillier-Partie-Nord-Est. In 1953, it became the Municipality of Saint-Aimé-du-Lac-des-Îles.

From January 8, 2003, to January 1, 2006, the municipality was amalgamated into the Town of Mont-Laurier.

== Geography ==
The south-flowing Lièvre River forms the eastern boundary of the municipality, where the Kiamika River meets the Lièvre River.

== Demographics ==
Canada census – Saint-Aimé-du-Lac-des-Îles community profile

	2021	2016	2011
Population	815 (+3.2% from 2016)	790 (+1.5% from 2011)	778 (+0.5% from 2006)
Land area	161.61 km^{2} (62.40 sq mi)	163.74 km^{2} (63.22 sq mi)	163.30 km^{2} (63.05 sq mi)
Population density	5.0/km^{2} (13/sq mi)	4.8/km^{2} (12/sq mi)	4.8/km^{2} (12/sq mi)
Median age	56.4 (M: 56.8, F: 56.4)	52.0 (M: 51.8, F: 52.2)	49.5 (M: 49.0, F: 49.7)
Private dwellings	481 (total)	486 (total)	478 (total)
Median household income	$68,500	$58,069	$59,098

References: 2021 2016 2011

Historical census populations – Saint-Aimé-du-Lac-des-Îles

Year	Pop.	±%
1921	468	—
1931	516	+10.3%
1941	753	+45.9%
1951	947	+25.8%
1956	662	−30.1%
1961	625	−5.6%
1966	636	+1.8%
1971	615	−3.3%
1976	585	−4.9%

Year	Pop.	±%
1981	683	+16.8%
1986	665	−2.6%
1991	724	+8.9%
1996	789	+9.0%
2001	751	−4.8%
2006	774	+3.1%
2011	778	+0.5%
2016	790	+1.5%
2021	815	+3.2%

Source: Statistics Canada

Private dwellings occupied by usual residents (2021): 375 (total dwellings: 481)

Mother tongue:

- English as first language: 0.6%
- French as first language: 97.5%
- English and French as first language: 0.6%
- Other as first language: 0.6%

== See also ==
- List of municipalities in Quebec
