= Notre-Dame-de-Pontmain =

- Municipality
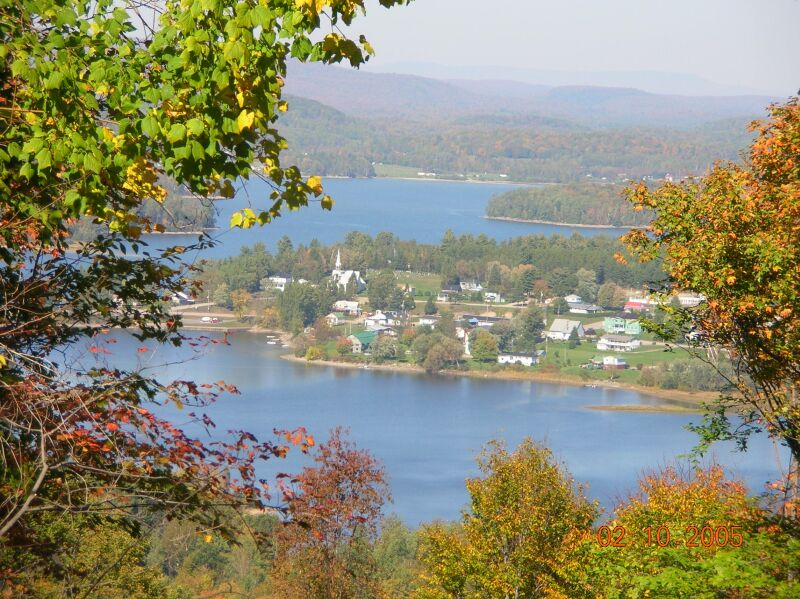
- Motto: Au coeur de la nature en famille
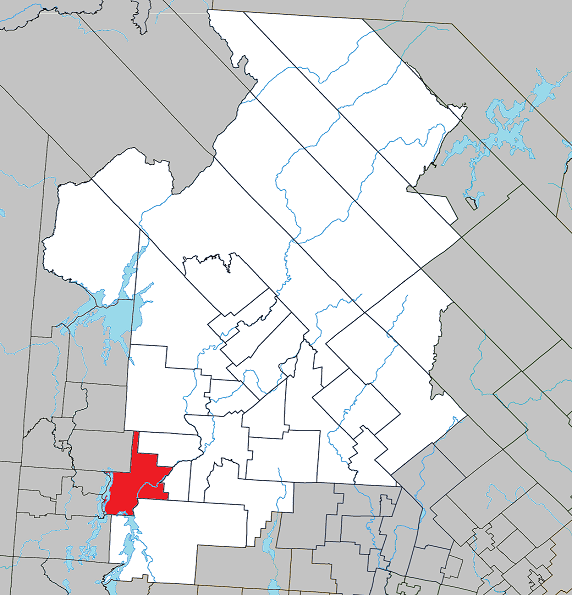
- Location within Antoine-Labelle RCM

- Location in central Quebec
- Coordinates: 46°17′N 75°38′W
- Country: Canada
- Province: Quebec
- Region: Laurentides
- RCM: Antoine-Labelle
- Constituted: January 26, 1894

Government
  - Mayor: Pierre Gagné
  - Federal riding: Laurentides—Labelle
  - Prov. riding: Labelle

Area
  - Total: 307.74 km^{2} (118.82 sq mi)
  - Land: 259.90 km^{2} (100.35 sq mi)

Population (2021)
  - Total: 790
  - Density: 3/km^{2} (7.8/sq mi)
  - Pop. 2016-2021: ▲1.0%
  - Dwellings: 746
- Time zone: UTC−5 (EST)
  - Summer (DST): UTC−4 (EDT)
- Postal code(s): J0W 1S0
- Area code: 819
- Highways: R-309; R-311
- Website: munpontmain.qc.ca

Notre-Dame-de-Pontmain (French pronunciation: [nɔtʁə dam də pɔ̃mɛ̃]) is a municipality in the Laurentides region of Quebec, Canada, part of the Antoine-Labelle Regional County Municipality.

The village itself is located between Camp and Dudley Lakes in the Lièvre River watershed.

== History ==
European colonization began when logging companies started to exploit the forests of the Du Lièvre River in the second half of the 19th century. By 1881, there were 35 families in the village.

In 1884, the local parish was formed which extended over the territory of Wabassee, Dudley, and Bouthillier geographic townships. The first pastor, Eugene Trinquier, serving from 1886 to 1907, was originally from Gap in the Hautes-Alpes (France) and named the parish Notre-Dame-de-Pontmain, after the apparitions of Our Lady of Pontmain.

On January 26, 1894, the Municipal Corporation of the United Townships of Wabassee-Dudley-et-Bouthillier was formed, becoming one of the oldest municipalities in the regional county. In 1897, its first bridge was built. In 1898, the first school opened, followed by the first general store in 1900, and the sawmill in 1902.

In 1945, it was renamed to Notre-Dame-de-Pontmain.

== Demographics ==
Canada census – Notre-Dame-de-Pontmain community profile

	2021	2016	2011
Population	790 (+1.0% from 2016)	782 (+8.6% from 2011)	720 (+1.1% from 2006)
Land area	259.90 km^{2} (100.35 sq mi)	263.48 km^{2} (101.73 sq mi)	262.93 km^{2} (101.52 sq mi)
Population density	3.0/km^{2} (7.8/sq mi)	3.0/km^{2} (7.8/sq mi)	2.7/km^{2} (7.0/sq mi)
Median age	62.4 (M: 63.2, F: 61.2)	59.1 (M: 60.4, F: 58.4)	54.3 (M: 55.6, F: 53.1)
Private dwellings	746 (total)	776 (total)	657 (total)
Median household income	$56,000	$49,237	$43,807

References: 2021 2016 2011

Historical census populations – Notre-Dame-de-Pontmain

Year	Pop.	±%
1901	617	—
1911	803	+30.1%
1921	467	−41.8%
1931	515	+10.3%
1941	613	+19.0%
1951	577	−5.9%
1956	569	−1.4%
1961	516	−9.3%
1966	471	−8.7%
1971	476	+1.1%

Year	Pop.	±%
1976	446	−6.3%
1981	487	+9.2%
1986	533	+9.4%
1991	547	+2.6%
1996	581	+6.2%
2001	620	+6.7%
2006	712	+14.8%
2011	720	+1.1%
2016	782	+8.6%
2021	790	+1.0%

Source: Statistics Canada

Private dwellings occupied by usual residents (2021): 411 (total dwellings: 746)

Mother tongue:

- English as first language: 1.9%
- French as first language: 95.6%
- English and French as first language: 1.3%
- Other as first language: 0.6%

== See also ==
- List of municipalities in Quebec
