= Notre-Dame-du-Laus =

- Municipality
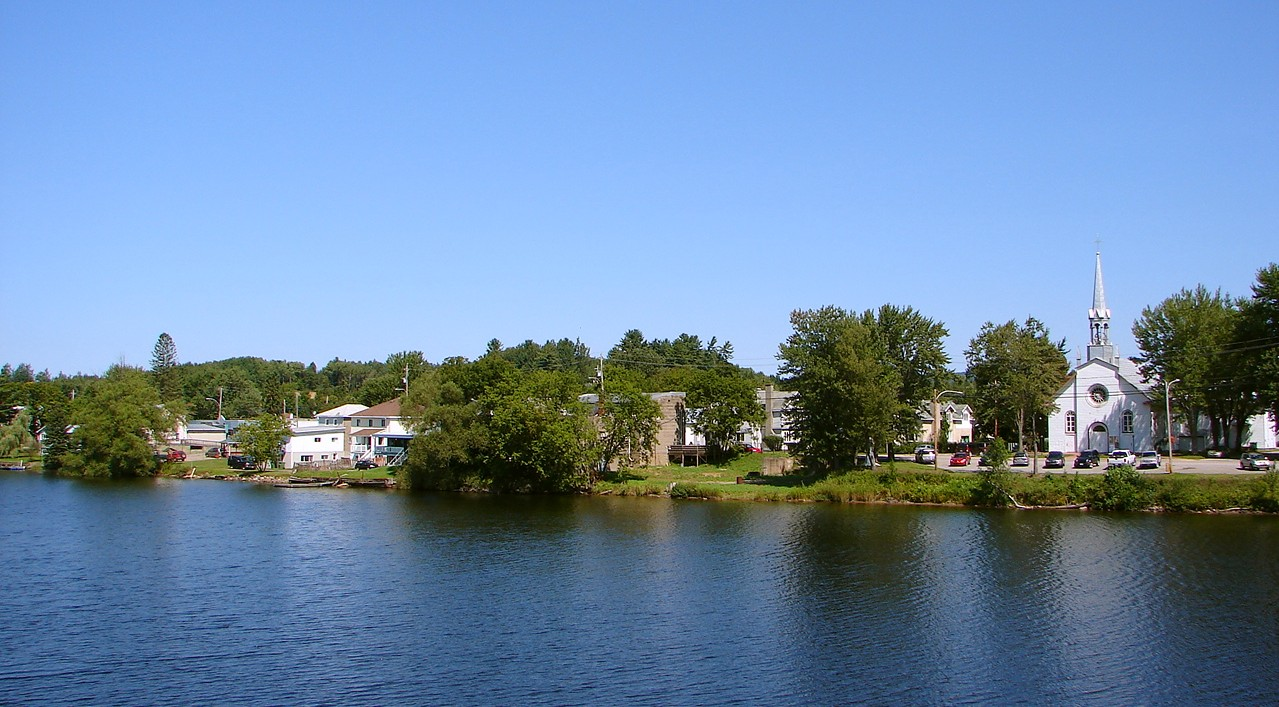

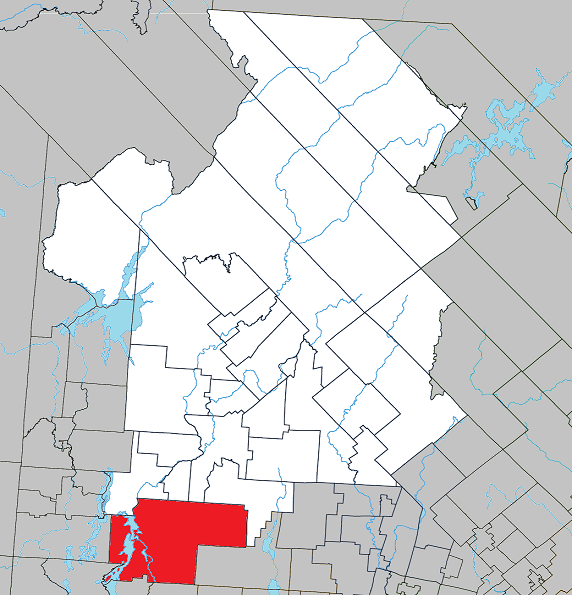
- Location within Antoine-Labelle RCM

- Location in central Quebec
- Coordinates: 46°05′N 75°37′W
- Country: Canada
- Province: Quebec
- Region: Laurentides
- RCM: Antoine-Labelle
- Constituted: January 1, 1876

Government
  - Mayor: David Cyr
  - Federal riding: Laurentides—Labelle
  - Prov. riding: Labelle

Area
  - Total: 960.95 km^{2} (371.02 sq mi)
  - Land: 849.10 km^{2} (327.84 sq mi)

Population (2021)
  - Total: 1,730
  - Density: 2/km^{2} (5.2/sq mi)
  - Pop. 2016-2021: ▲11.0%
  - Dwellings: 1,924
- Time zone: UTC−5 (EST)
  - Summer (DST): UTC−4 (EDT)
- Postal code(s): J0X 2M0
- Area code: 819
- Highways: R-309
- Website: www.notre-dame-du-laus.ca

Notre-Dame-du-Laus is a municipality in the Laurentides region of Quebec, Canada, part of the Antoine-Labelle Regional County Municipality.

The municipality is characterized by hilly forests with a great number of lakes, rivers, and creeks. Because of those nature gems, many cottages are owned and built in the area. The eastern portion of its territory is part of the Papineau-Labelle Wildlife Reserve. Consequently, the local economy is dependent on forestry as well as on the influx of tourists, fishermen and hunters.

== History ==
Between 1820 and 1849, the Hudson's Bay Company operated a trading post at the outlet of Sables Lake on the Du Lièvre River that controlled all the fur brigades from the upper Du Lièvre and Gatineau Rivers.

In 1873, the Notre-Dame-du-Laus parish was founded, named after the apparitions of Our Lady of Laus. In 1876, the place was incorporated as the United Township Municipality of Bigelow-Wells-Blake-et-McGill, and two years later the post office, which was named Notre-Dame-du-Laus, opened.

In February 1946, the municipality was renamed to its current name.

== Demographics ==
Canada census – Notre-Dame-du-Laus community profile

| | 2021 | 2016 | 2011 |
| Population | 1,730 (+11.0% from 2016) | 1,558 (+2.6% from 2011) | 1,518 (-2.9% from 2006) |
| Land area | 849.10 km^{2} (327.84 sq mi) | 862.08 km^{2} (332.85 sq mi) | 862.55 km^{2} (333.03 sq mi) |
| Population density | 2.0/km^{2} (5.2/sq mi) | 1.8/km^{2} (4.7/sq mi) | 1.8/km^{2} (4.7/sq mi) |
| Median age | 62.4 (M: 62.4, F: 62.4) | 59.7 (M: 59.7, F: 59.6) | 56.4 (M: 56.7, F: 56.2) |
| Private dwellings | 1,924 (total) | 1,966 (total) | 1,878 (total) |
| Median household income | $56,800 | $46,560 | $42,224 |

References: 2021 2016 2011

Historical census populations – Notre-Dame-du-Laus

| Year | Pop. | ±% |
|---|---|---|
| 1881 | 585 | — |
| 1891 | 655 | +12.0% |
| 1901 | 886 | +35.3% |
| 1911 | 1,087 | +22.7% |
| 1921 | 1,041 | −4.2% |
| 1931 | 1,172 | +12.6% |
| 1941 | 1,218 | +3.9% |
| 1951 | 1,379 | +13.2% |
| 1956 | 1,387 | +0.6% |
| 1961 | 1,390 | +0.2% |
| 1966 | 1,312 | −5.6% |

| Year | Pop. | ±% |
|---|---|---|
| 1971 | 1,135 | −13.5% |
| 1976 | 1,110 | −2.2% |
| 1981 | 1,198 | +7.9% |
| 1986 | 1,327 | +10.8% |
| 1991 | 1,244 | −6.3% |
| 1996 | 1,378 | +10.8% |
| 2001 | 1,382 | +0.3% |
| 2006 | 1,564 | +13.2% |
| 2011 | 1,518 | −2.9% |
| 2016 | 1,558 | +2.6% |
| 2021 | 1,730 | +11.0% |

Source: Statistics Canada

Private dwellings occupied by usual residents (2021): 932 (total dwellings: 1,924)

Mother tongue:

- English as first language: 3.8%
- French as first language: 94.7%
- English and French as first language: 0.9%
- Other as first language: 0.9%

== See also ==
- List of municipalities in Quebec
