= Chantale Jeannotte =

Canadian politician

Member of the National Assembly of Quebec for Labelle
- In office October 1, 2018 – August 27, 2026
- Preceded by: Sylvain Pagé
- Succeeded by: Catherine Drouin

Personal details
- Born: 1964 Montreal
- Party: Coalition Avenir Québec

Chantale Jeannotte is a Canadian politician, who was elected to the National Assembly of Quebec in the 2018 provincial election. She represented the electoral district of Labelle as a member of the Coalition Avenir Québec. She did not seek re-election in the 2026 general election.

== Electoral record ==
2022 Quebec general election: Labelle
Party	Candidate	Votes	%	±%
Coalition Avenir Québec	Chantale Jeannotte	17,662	53.08	+16.58
Parti Québécois	Daniel Corbeil	6,366	19.13	–15.51
Québec solidaire	Jasmine Roy	4,079	12.26	–3.08
Conservative	Claude Paquin	3,173	9.54	+8.72
Liberal	Annie Bélizaire	1,679	5.05	–5.86
Climat Québec	François Beauchamp	313	0.94	–
Total valid votes		33,272	98.16	–0.42
Total rejected ballots		622	1.84	+0.42
Turnout		33,894	65.15	–2.05
Electors on the lists		52,028	–	–

2018 Quebec general election: Labelle
Party	Candidate	Votes	%	±%
Coalition Avenir Québec	Chantale Jeannotte	11,784	36.5	+15.41
Parti Québécois	Sylvain Pagé	11,185	34.64	-10.52
Québec solidaire	Gabriel Dagenais	4,954	15.34	+7.3
Liberal	Nadine Riopel	3,524	10.91	-14.12
Green	René Fournier	395	1.22	
Conservative	Francis Brosseau	265	0.82	
Citoyens au pouvoir	Régis Ostigny	181	0.56	
Total valid votes		32,288	98.58	
Total rejected ballots		465	1.42	
Turnout		32,753	67.20	
Eligible voters		48,741		
Coalition Avenir Québec gain from Parti Québécois		Swing		+12.97
Source(s) "Rapport des résultats officiels du scrutin". Élections Québec.
