= Kiamika =

Kiamika can refer to the following places, all in Quebec, Canada:

- Kiamika, Quebec, municipality
- Kiamika River
- Kiamika Reservoir
  - Kiamika Reservoir Regional Park
