= Kiamika Reservoir =

Reservoir of Laurentides, in Quebec, Canada

- Réservoir Kiamika (French)
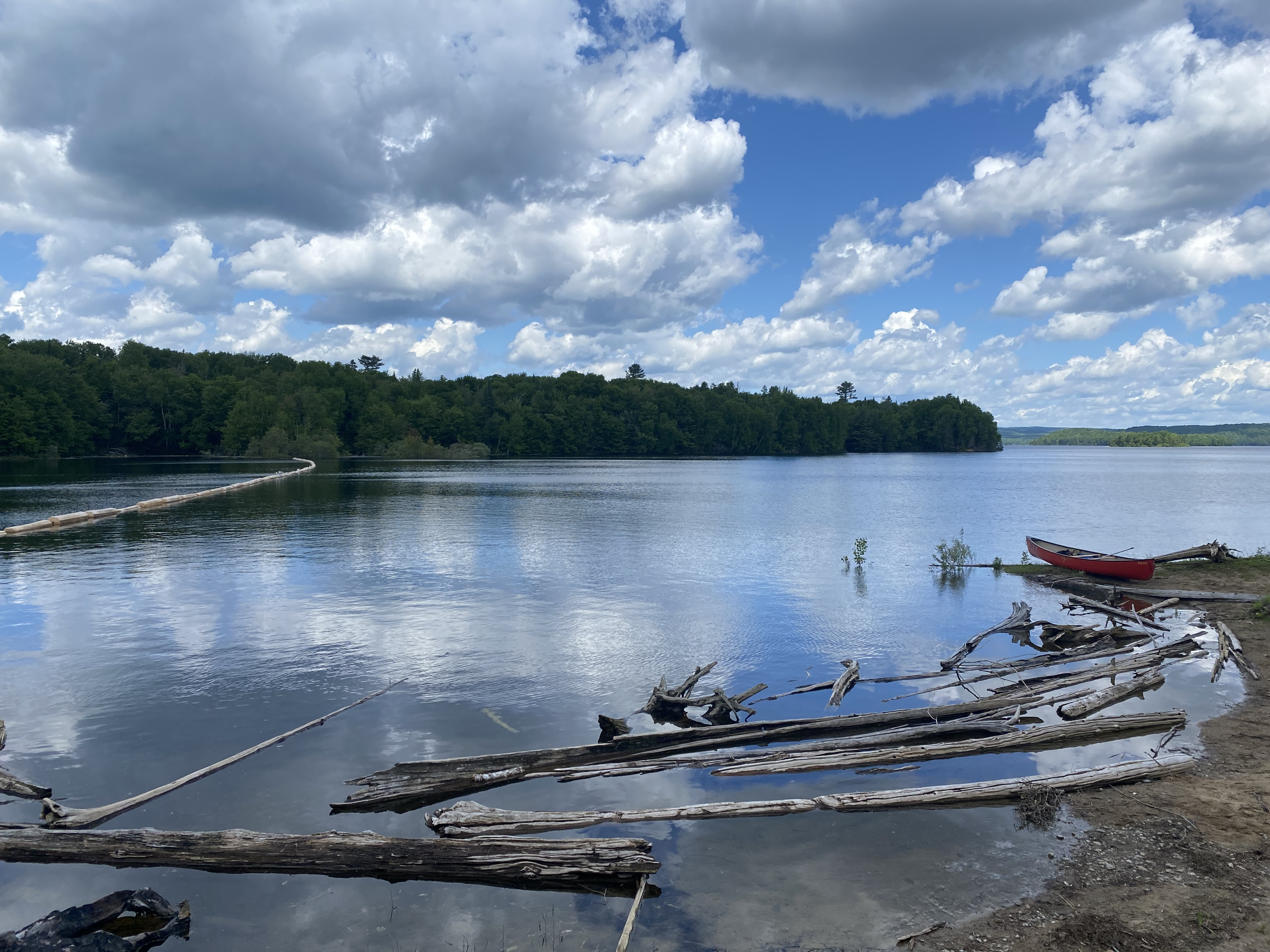
- Reservoir near the dam

- Location within Quebec
- Location: Antoine-Labelle Regional County Municipality, Laurentides, Quebec, Canada
- Coordinates: 46.67083°N 75.07195°W
- Type: Reservoir
- Primary inflows: Kiamika River
- Primary outflows: Kiamika River
- Max. length: 20.0 kilometres (12.4 mi)
- Max. width: 9.0 kilometres (5.6 mi)
- Surface area: 4,248 hectares (10,500 acres)
- Frozen: From beginning of December to mid of March
- Islands: 21

The Kiamika reservoir is a freshwater body located in the Kiamika Reservoir Regional Park, in unorganized territory of Lac-Douaire, in Antoine-Labelle Regional County Municipality, in the region of Laurentides, in Quebec, in Canada.

The Kiamika reservoir extends over the territory of four municipalities: Chute-Saint-Philippe (southern part of the reservoir), Lac-des-Écorces, Lac-Saguay and Rivière-Rouge. The reservoir extents also over mainly in the townships of Brunet, but also Rochon and Turgeon for the southern part.

== Geography ==
This reservoir (altitude: 260 metres (850 ft)) covers 4,248 hectares (10,500 acres) and the area of the watershed is 701.9 kilometres (436.14 mi). This reservoir constitutes the third largest body of water in the region.

The Kiamika River supplies the reservoir from the northeast through the Northern Bay of the lake, through which the current flows over 4.1 kilometres (2.5 mi) west, then south. Then the current flows on 13.1 kilometres (8.1 mi) towards the southwest, bypassing the "Île de la Perdrix Blanche" (White Perdrix Island) and the "Petite île de la Perdrix" (Small Perdrix Island) by crossing the Kiamika Reservoir, until the mouth from the lake to the southwest.

Before the land was submerged, the Kiamika River had two lakes: Upper Kiamika and Lower Kiamika. In 1952, the MacLaren Company undertook construction work which was related to the objective of controlling the floods of the Lièvre and the Ottawa for hydroelectric power generation. The Kiamika dam and the two retaining dikes thus created this large reservoir, facilitating logging on the Kiamika River.

The two main islands in the reservoir are "Île de la Perdrix Blanche" (11.7 kilometres (7.27 mi) and its summit 457 metres (1,499 ft)) and the "Petite île de la Perdrix" (5.4 kilometres (3.36 mi) and its peak reached 364 metres (1,194 ft)). The surface area of the reservoir can drop from 52 kilometres (32.31 mi) to 35 kilometres (21.75 mi) during the period of the spring emptying, thus clearing sandy beaches on the banks and connecting the two main islands between them.

The main bays of the reservoir are: Quatre Milles bay, Blueberry bay, Berthelette bay, des Écorces bay and Cutaway bay (to the south). In addition to the Kiamika River, the reservoir is supplied by:

- northwest side: Kilby Creek (coming from the northwest), Elbow Creek and Colinette Creek;
- east side: the outlet of Lac Kilby and Lac Patate; the Ruisseau aux Bluets-Ouest which drains the Lac aux Bluets; Ruby Creek which drains Ruby Lake;
- south-east side: the discharge of Lac Vert and Lac du Parsnip; the outlet of Lake Johnny;
- south side: the outlet of Lake Bélanger and the Loutre;
- west side: the outlet of Roman lake; the discharge of Daviault lakes; the Cornes stream which drains the Lac des Cornes, Lac Doré, Lac Vaillant, Lac Pérodeau, Lac David-Lord and Lac Adrien.

The main peaks around the reservoir reach:

- north-west side: 425 metres (1,394 ft) (at 1.2 kilometres (0.75 mi) from the lake); 368 metres (1,207 ft) (at 0.7 kilometres (0.43 mi) from the lake);
- east side: 513 metres (1,683 ft) (at 1.8 kilometres (1.1 mi) from the lake); 457 metres (1,499 ft) (at 2.8 kilometres (1.7 mi) from the lake); 414 metres (1,358 ft) (at 2.5 kilometres (1.6 mi) from the lake, or south of Lac Patate); 390 metres (1,280 ft) (at 1.0 kilometre (0.62 mi) from the lake; that is, southeast of Lake Kilby); 399 metres (1,309 ft) (at 1.0 kilometre (0.62 mi) southwest of Kilby Lake); 400 metres (1,300 ft) (at 1.6 kilometres (0.99 mi) from the lake, or northwest of Ruby Lake); 444 metres (1,457 ft) (at 1.5 kilometres (0.93 mi) from the lake, or northwest of Frasier Lake); 445 metres (1,460 ft) (at 1.3 kilometres (0.81 mi) from the lake, located to the west of Lac Frasier); 440 metres (1,440 ft) (at 1.4 kilometres (0.87 mi) from the lake, i.e. south of Lac Frasier;
- south side: 488 metres (1,601 ft) (at 1.9 kilometres (1.2 mi) from the lake, i.e. about Lake Johnny); 429 metres (1,407 ft) (at 1.2 kilometres (0.75 mi) from the lake); 463 metres (1,519 ft) (at 1.8 kilometres (1.1 mi) from the lake, or south of Baie Berthelette);
- west side: 429 metres (1,407 ft) (at 2.5 kilometres (1.6 mi) from the lake, or north of Lake Noé).

== Dams and dikes ==
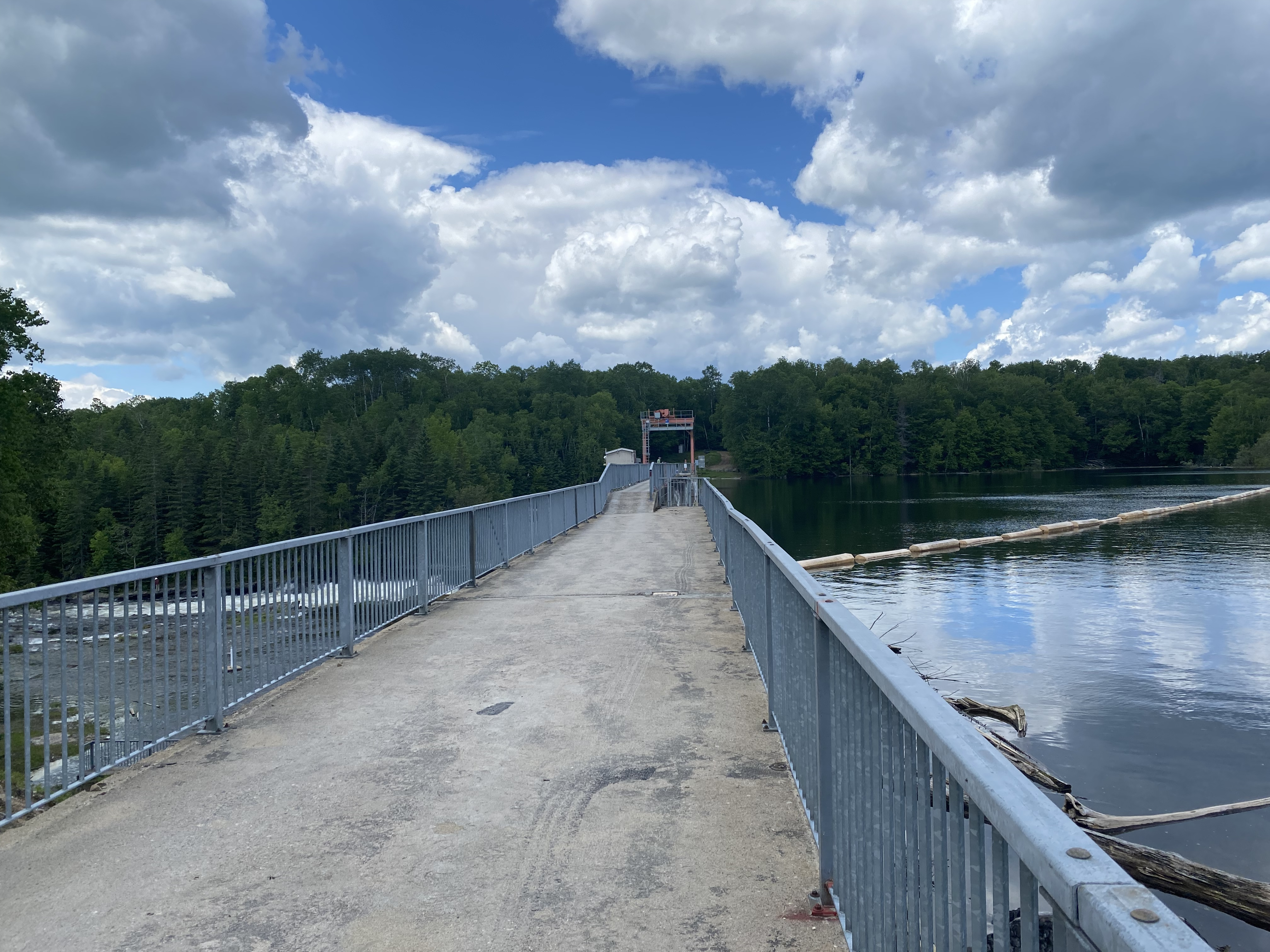
Kiamika dam

The Kiamika reservoir has a dam and three retaining dikes, for hydroelectric regulation:

- Kiamika dam, located in the municipality Chute-Saint-Philippe. This high-capacity dam has a height of 15.7 metres (52 ft) and a retention height of 14.2 metres (47 ft). Concrete-gravity type, this 249 metres (817 ft) long structure was built in 1954 on a rock foundation.
- Kiamika-2 dike, located in the municipality of Lac-Saguay. This dike, 10 metres (33 ft) high and 344 metres (1,129 ft) long, made of earth, was built in 1954 on a rock foundation. This dike is the property of Ministry of the Environment and the Fight Against Climate Change (Ministère de l’Environnement, de la Lutte contre les changements climatiques, de la Faune et des Parcs).
- Kiamika-5 dike, located in the municipality of Chute-Saint-Philippe. This dike, 2.5 metres (8 ft 2 in) high and 160 metres (520 ft) long, made of earth, was built in 1954. This dike is owned by the Ministry of the Environment and the Fight Against Climate Change (Ministère de l’Environnement, de la Lutte contre les changements climatiques, de la Faune et des Parcs).

On 3 December 2023, residents of about 1,000 properties in the municipalities of Chute-Saint-Philippe and Lac-des-Écorces were ordered to evacuate over fears that the Morier dike might burst.

== Toponymy ==
The toponym "Kiamika" means "steep rock" in Algonquin. Formerly, one of the two lakes (before submersion) was designated "Grand lac Kiamika"; it is thus indicated on the 1891 map of the canton of Rochon.

== See also ==
- Kiamika, Quebec, a municipality
- Lac-Oscar, an unorganized territory
- Regional Park (Quebec)
