= Lac des Écorces =

Lac des Écorces or Lac-des-Écorces (French for "Bark Lake") can refer to the following places, all in Quebec, Canada:

- Lac des Écorces (Antoine-Labelle), lake
- Lac des Écorces (Les Laurentides), lake in Barkmere
- Lac-des-Écorces, Quebec, municipality
- Lac-des-Écorces, Quebec (former unorganized territory)

== See also ==
- Lac aux Écorces
