= Sainte-Anne-du-Lac =

- Municipality
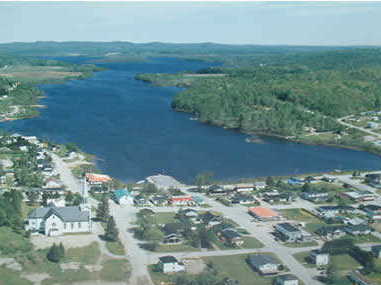
- Sainte-Anne-du-Lac and Lake Tapani

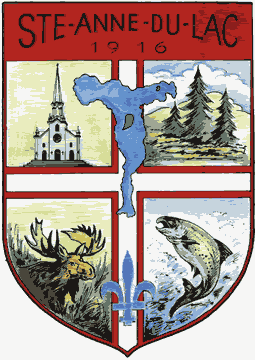
- Coat of arms

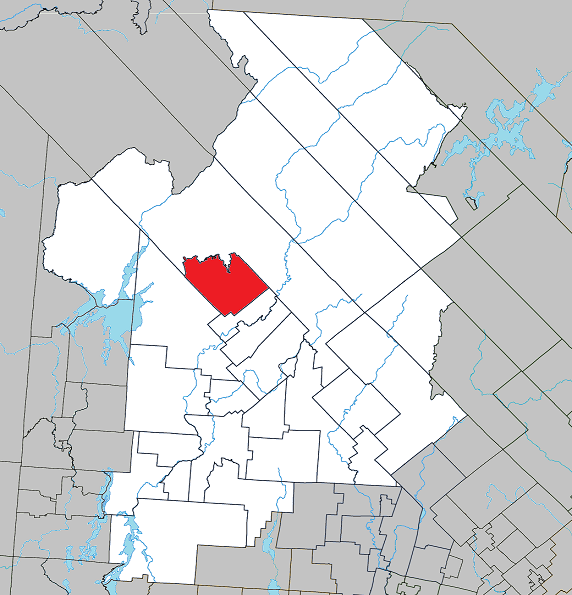
- Location within Antoine-Labelle RCM

- Location in central Quebec
- Coordinates: 46°53′N 75°20′W
- Country: Canada
- Province: Quebec
- Region: Laurentides
- RCM: Antoine-Labelle
- Settled: 1870s
- Constituted: December 30, 1976

Government
  - Mayor: Jocelyne Lafond
  - Federal riding: Laurentides—Labelle
  - Prov. riding: Labelle

Area (2021)
  - Total: 345.73 km^{2} (133.49 sq mi)
  - Land: 320.73 km^{2} (123.83 sq mi)

Population (2021)
  - Total: 556
  - Density: 1.7/km^{2} (4.4/sq mi)
  - Pop. 2016-2021: ▼3.3%
  - Dwellings: 422
- Time zone: UTC−05:00 (EST)
  - Summer (DST): UTC−04:00 (EDT)
- Postal code(s): J0W 1V0
- Area code: 819
- Highways: R-309
- Website: www.steannedulac.ca

Sainte-Anne-du-Lac (French pronunciation: [sɛ̃t an dy lak]) is a municipality and village in the Laurentides region of Quebec, Canada, part of the Antoine-Labelle Regional County Municipality.

Sainte-Anne-du-Lac is the northernmost community in the Laurentides region, about 45 km (28 mi) from Mont-Laurier. The village itself is located at the northern terminus of Quebec Route 309, on the south shore of Lake Tapani.

== History ==
Settlement began around 1870. In 1916, the Parish of Sainte-Anne-du-Lac was formed, and the following year, the first school was built. Also in 1917, the Township of Décarie was established, and incorporated as a township municipality in 1920. It was named in honour of Jérémie-Louis Décarie. The township municipality used to extend to the Lièvre River, but the south-eastern portion was ceded in 1928 to the then newly created Municipality of Mont-Saint-Michel.

In 1950, the village itself separated from the township to form the Village Municipality of Sainte-Anne-du-Lac.

On December 30, 1976, the township and village municipalities merged to form the current Municipality of Sainte-Anne-du-Lac.

== Demographics ==
Canada census – Sainte-Anne-du-Lac community profile

	2021	2016
Population	556 (-3.3% from 2016)	575 (-7.1% from 2011)
Land area	320.73 km^{2} (123.83 sq mi)	322.59 km^{2} (124.55 sq mi)
Population density	1.7/km^{2} (4.4/sq mi)	1.8/km^{2} (4.7/sq mi)
Median age	59.6 (M: 60.4, F: 58.0)	55.5 (M: 57.4, F: 54.4)
Private dwellings	422 (total)	364 (total)
Median household income		$37,760

References: 2021 2016

Historical populations (Statistics Canada)

Year	Pop.	±%
1976	688	—
1981	686	−0.3%
1986	582	−15.2%
1991	637	+9.5%
1996	623	−2.2%

Year	Pop.	±%
2001	570	−8.5%
2006	613	+7.5%
2011	619	+1.0%
2016	575	−7.1%
2021	556	−3.3%

1991, 1996. 2001, 2006. 2011, 2016

Private dwellings occupied by usual residents (2021): 299 (total dwellings: 422)

Mother tongue:

- French as first language: 95.65%
- English as first language: 2.61%
- English and French as first language: 0.87%
- Other as first language: 0.87%

== Local government ==
List of former mayors:

- Aimé Lachapelle (...–2013)
- Annick Brault (2013–2021)
- Jocelyne Lafond (2021–present)

== See also ==
- List of municipalities in Quebec
