= Ferme-Neuve =

- Municipality
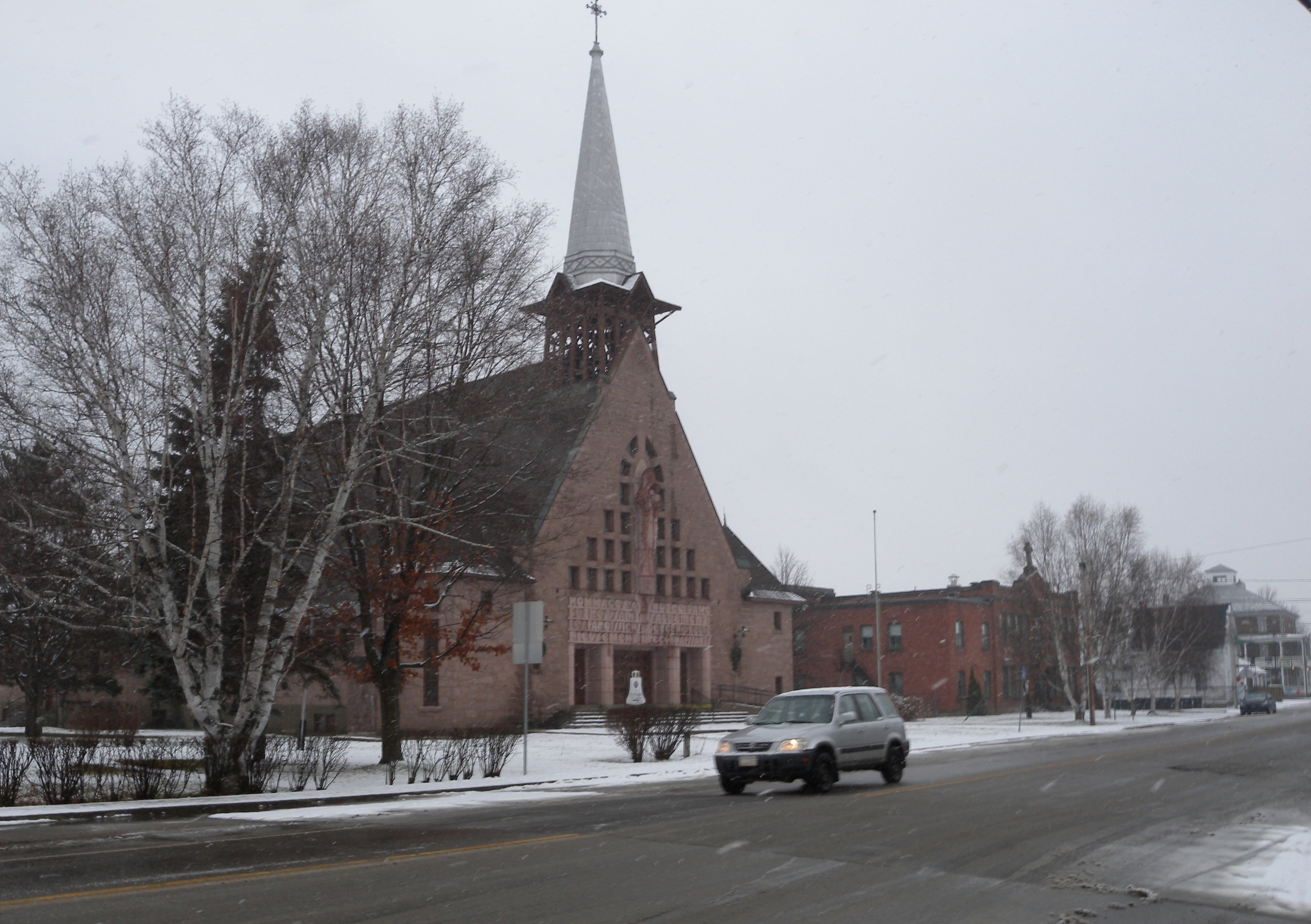
- The Roman Catholic church in Ferme-Neuve
- Motto: Non nova sed nove (English: "Not new but in a new way")
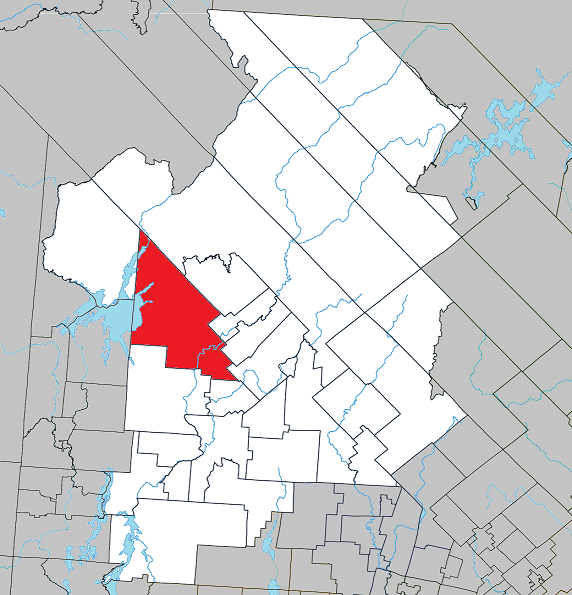
- Location within Antoine-Labelle RCM

- Location in central Quebec
- Coordinates: 46°42′N 75°27′W
- Country: Canada
- Province: Quebec
- Region: Laurentides
- RCM: Antoine-Labelle
- Settled: 1890s
- Constituted: December 24, 1997

Government
  - Mayor: Diane Sirard
  - Federal riding: Laurentides—Labelle
  - Prov. riding: Labelle

Area
  - Total: 875.10 km^{2} (337.88 sq mi)
  - Land: 790.29 km^{2} (305.13 sq mi)

Population (2021)
  - Total: 2,716
  - Density: 3.5/km^{2} (9.1/sq mi)
  - Pop. 2016-2021: ▲0.4%
  - Dwellings: 1,453
- Time zone: UTC−5 (EST)
  - Summer (DST): UTC−4 (EDT)
- Postal code(s): J0W 1C0
- Area code: 819
- Highways: R-309
- Website: www.municipalite.ferme-neuve.qc.ca

Ferme-Neuve (French pronunciation: [fɛʁm nœv], lit. 'New Farm') is a municipality part of the Antoine-Labelle Regional County Municipality, in the Laurentides region of Quebec, Canada. It is the largest incorporated municipality of the Laurentides region.

The village is located on the shores of the Lièvre River and Journalists Lake, and along Quebec Route 309, about 20 kilometres (12 mi) north of Mont-Laurier.

== History ==
In the 19th century, the area began attracting loggers because of its rich red and white pine stands. In 1850, the James MacLaren logging company built a large tree farm called "La Ferme de la Montagne" that was used as a supply camp for loggers. It was sold in 1888 to Cyrille Lafontaine and inhabited by his son Léonard who became the first settler and farmer of Ferme-Neuve. In 1898, the Ferme-Neuve Post Office opened.

In 1902, a group of 8 Montreal journalists, under direction from Lomer Gouin, Minister of Colonization, built a model farm in order to attract more settlers. They also launched a public subscription to build a school. In recognition, the lake adjacent to the settlement was called Lac des Journalistes ("Lake of Journalists").

Also in 1902, the United Township Municipality of Würtele-Moreau-et-Gravel was formed, with Toussaint Cloutier as first mayor. In 1917, the Ferme-Neuve settlement separated from the united township and became an incorporated village, with Henri Berthiaume as its first mayor. In 1930, the United Township Municipality of Würtele-Moreau-et-Gravel changed statutes and was renamed to the Parish Municipality of Ferme-Neuve.

On December 24, 1997, both entities were merged again into the new Municipality of Ferme-Neuve.

== Demographics ==
Canada census – Ferme-Neuve community profile

	2021	2016
Population	2,716 (+0.4% from 2016)	2,706 (-4.1% from 2011)
Land area	786.19 km^{2} (303.55 sq mi)	793.44 km^{2} (306.35 sq mi)
Population density	3.5/km^{2} (9.1/sq mi)	3.4/km^{2} (8.8/sq mi)
Median age	53.2 (M: 52.4, F: 54.4)	50.7 (M: 49.8, F: 51.4)
Private dwellings	1,453 (total) 1,276 (occupied)	1,388 (total)
Median household income	$55,600	$48,480

References: 2021 2016

Historical census populations – Ferme-Neuve

Year	Pop.	±%
1976	2,938	—
1981	3,118	+6.1%
1986	3,025	−3.0%
1991	3,174	+4.9%
1996	3,091	−2.6%

Year	Pop.	±%
2001	2,947	−4.7%
2006	3,006	+2.0%
2011	2,822	−6.1%
2016	2,706	−4.1%
2021	2,716	+0.4%

Population amounts prior to 1997 are total of Ferme-Neuve (Village) and Ferme-Neuve (Parish).
Source: Statistics Canada

Population trend (prior to amalgamation):

- Population in 1996:
  - Parish of Ferme-Neuve: 913
  - Village of Ferme-Neuve: 2178
- Population in 1991:
  - Parish of Ferme-Neuve: 907
  - Village of Ferme-Neuve: 2267

Private dwellings occupied by usual residents: 1,276 (total dwellings: 1,453)

Mother tongue:

- English as first language: 0.8%
- French as first language: 98.8%
- English and French as first language: 0%
- Other as first language: 0.4%

== Local government ==
List of former mayors:

- Sylvain Leduc (...–2005)
- Claude Dufour (2005–2009)
- Gilbert Pilote (2009–2021)
- Diane Sirard (2021–present)

== See also ==
- List of municipalities in Quebec
