= Quebec Route 309 =

Highway in Quebec

Route 309

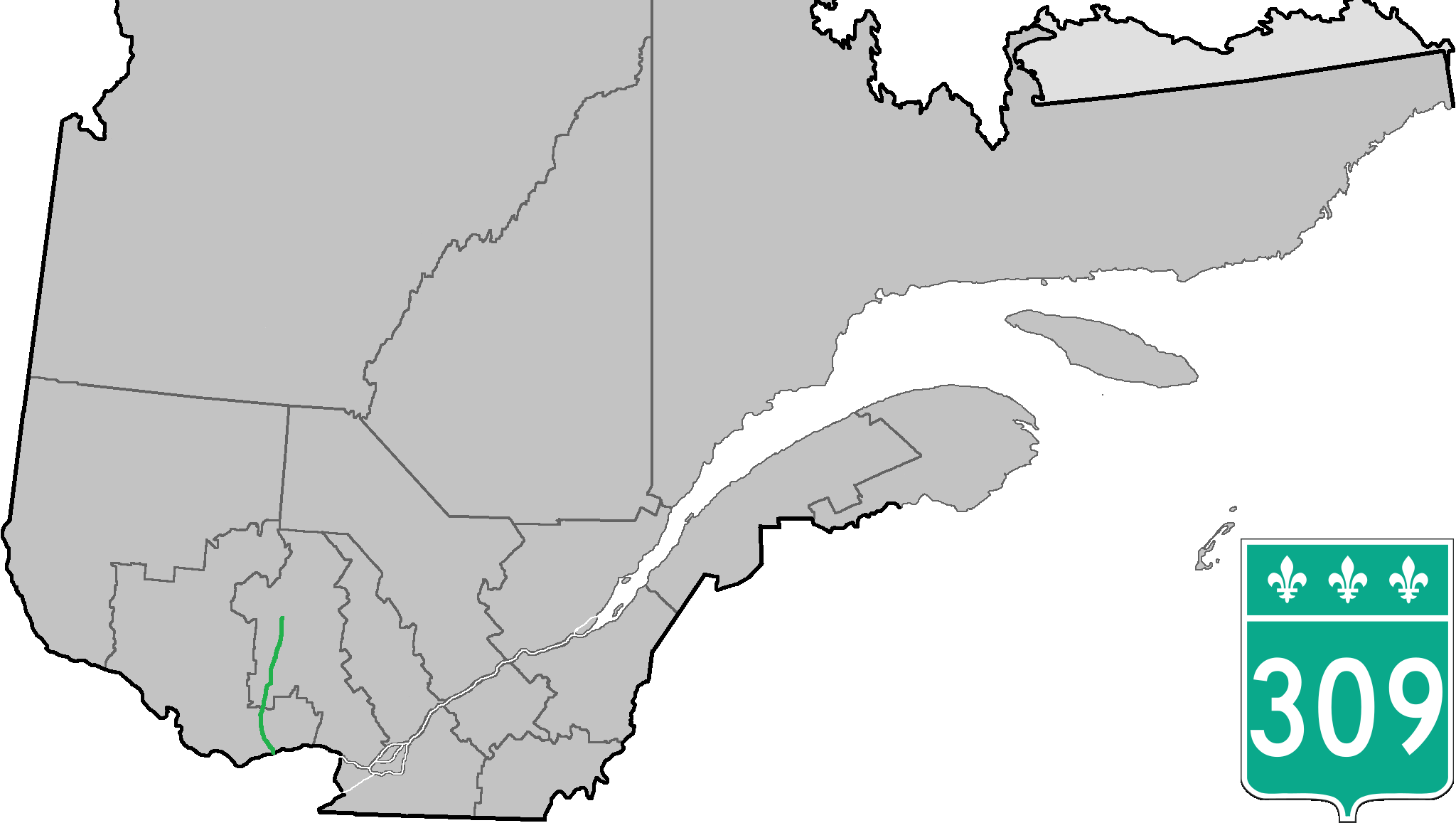

Route information
- Maintained by Transports Québec
- Length: 184.9 km (114.9 mi)

Major junctions
- South end: A-50 in Gatineau (Buckingham)
- R-315 in L'Ange-Gardien; R-307 in Val-des-Bois; R-311 in Notre-Dame-de-Pontmain; R-117 (TCH) in Mont-Laurier; R-311 in Mont-Saint-Michel
- North end: Rue du Lac in Sainte-Anne-du-Lac

Location
- Country: Canada
- Province: Quebec
- Major cities: Gatineau, L'Ange-Gardien, Mont-Laurier

Highway system
- Quebec provincial highways; Autoroutes; List; Former
← R-307	→ R-311

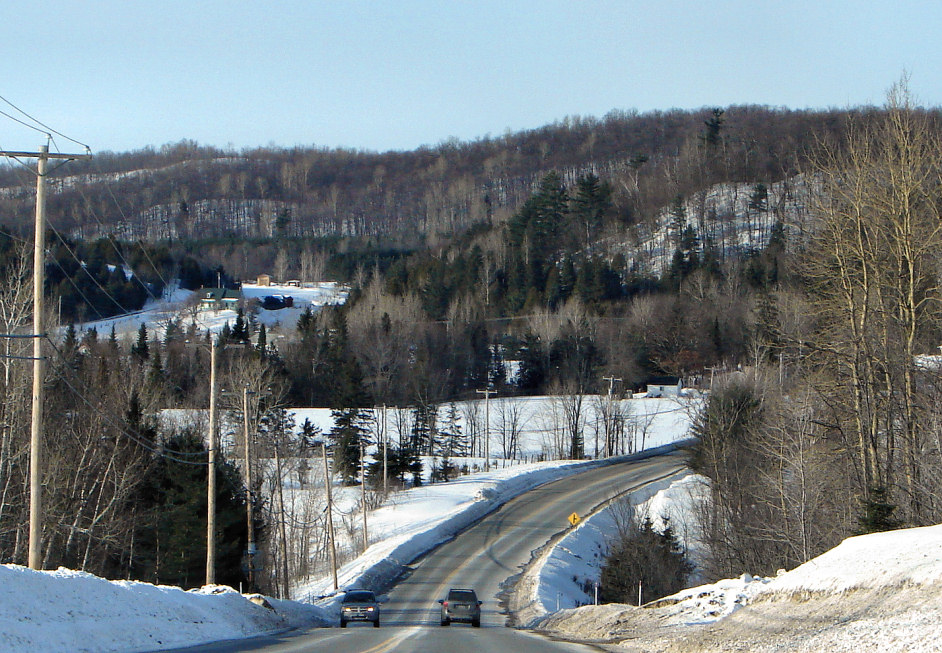
Route 309 through L'Ange-Gardien.

Route 309 is a provincial highway located in the Outaouais region in western Quebec. It starts at the junction of Autoroute 50 in the Buckingham sector, in the city of Gatineau's east end. It runs mostly parallel to the Du Lièvre River and ends north of Mont-Laurier in the town of Sainte-Anne-du-Lac in the Upper Laurentians.

Initially, the highway started at the junction of Route 148 in the Masson-Angers sector about 3 kilometers south of Buckingham and about 10 kilometers of its current southern terminus. An eastern extension of A-50, as part of the 3-phase project that would connect both segments of the highway between Buckingham and Brownsburg-Chatham (near Lachute) by 2010, was completed in 2005 and Transports Quebec relocated the route's southern to the current western segment terminus at Dougherty Road to act as a by-pass of Buckingham.

Route 315 replaced the portion of Route 309 from Route 148 to the current routing of Route 315. Portions north of the current Route 315 are no longer marked as a provincial road and are under jurisdiction of the city of Gatineau for the Avenue de Buckingham portion while the municipality of L'Ange-Gardien has the jurisdiction of the segment from the city of Gatineau boundaries to the junction of the new and realigned Route 309.

== Municipalities along Route 309 ==
- Gatineau - (Buckingham)
- L'Ange-Gardien
- Notre-Dame-de-la-Salette
- Val-des-Bois
- Notre-Dame-du-Laus
- Notre-Dame-de-Pontmain
- Saint-Aimé-du-Lac-des-Îles
- Kiamika
- Mont-Laurier
- Ferme-Neuve
- Mont-Saint-Michel
- Sainte-Anne-du-Lac

== Major intersections ==
RCM or ET	Municipality	Km	Junction	Notes
Southern terminus of Route 309
Gatineau	Buckingham	0.0	A-50	50 WEST: to Gatineau; 50 EAST: to Mirabel
Les Collines-de-l'Outaouais	L'Ange-Gardien	0.6	R-315	315 NORTH: to Masson-Angers; 315 NORTH: to Mayo
Papineau	Val-des-Bois	46.8	R-307 (North end)	307 SOUTH: to Bowman
Antoine-Labelle	Notre-Dame-de-Pontmain	103.7	R-311 (South end)	311 NORTH: to Lac-du-Cerf
Antoine-Labelle	Mont-Laurier	136.2	R-117 (TCH)	117 NORTH: to Val-d'Or; 117 SOUTH: to Mont-Tremblant
Antoine-Labelle	Mont-Saint-Michel	170.9	R-311 (North end)	311 SOUTH: to Lac-Saint-Paul
Antoine-Labelle	Sainte-Anne-du-Lac	184.9	Rue du Lac	
Northern terminus of Route 309

== See also ==
- List of Quebec provincial highways
- List of Gatineau roads
