= Lac des Écorces (Antoine-Labelle) =

Lake in Laurentides, in Quebec, Canada

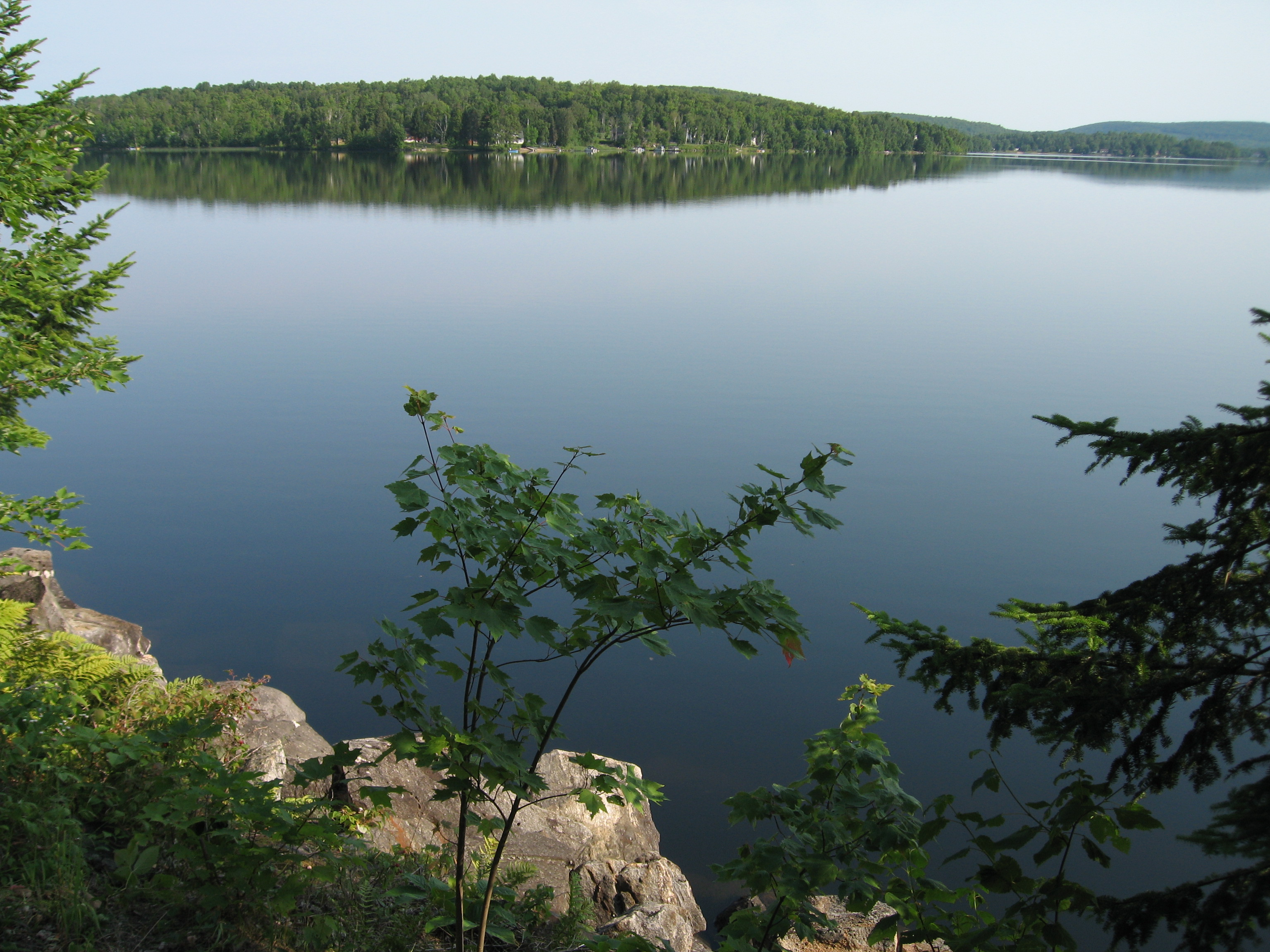

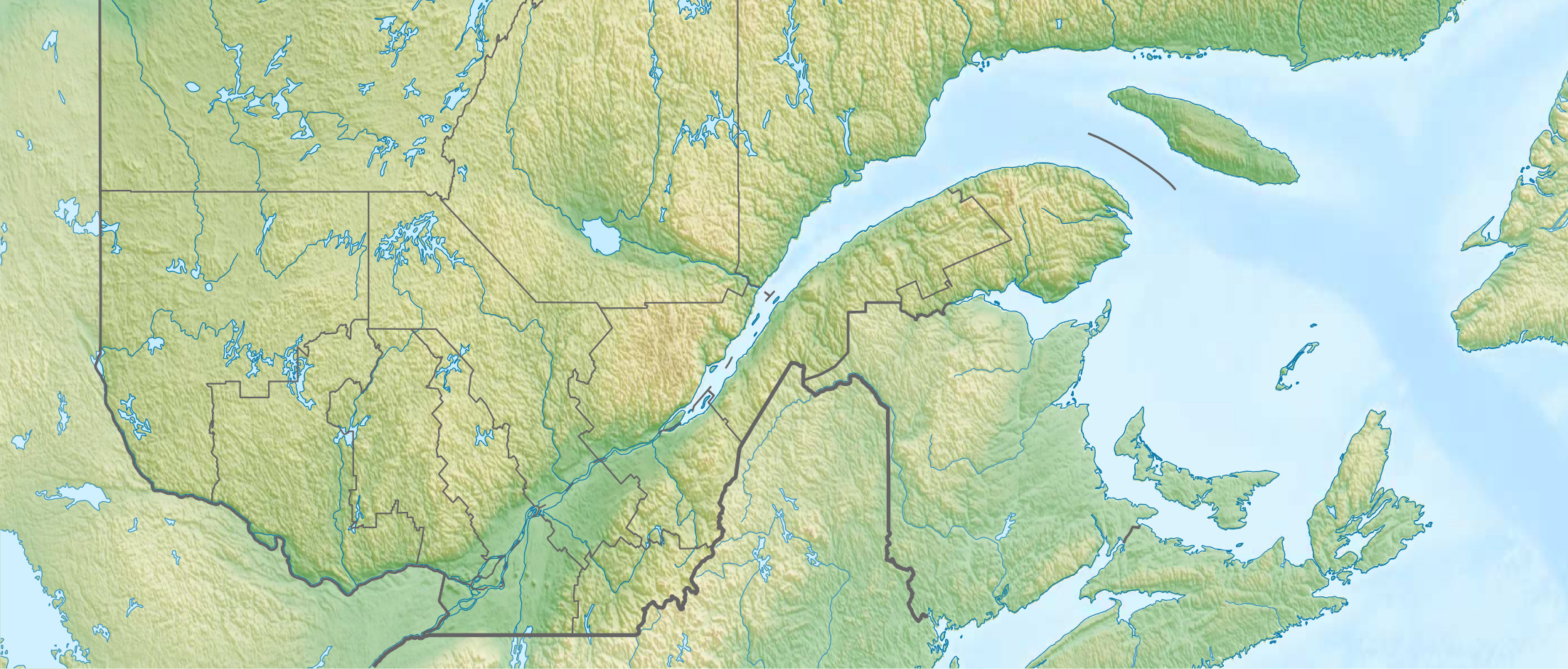
- Location within Quebec South
- Location: Antoine-Labelle Regional County Municipality, Laurentides, Quebec, Canada
- Coordinates: 46.5244°N 75.41722°W
- Primary inflows: Kiamika River
- Primary outflows: Kiamika River
- Frozen: From beginning of December to mid-March
- Islands: 2

Lac des Écorces (French for "Bark Lake") is a freshwater lake on the boundary of Mont-Laurier and Lac-des-Écorces, in the Antoine-Labelle Regional County Municipality, in the administrative region of Laurentides, Quebec, Canada.

== Toponymy ==
The toponym "Lac des Écorces" was made official on 5 December 1968 at the Place Names Bank of the Commission de toponymie du Québec.

== See also ==
- Lac-des-Écorces Water Aerodrome
- Kiamika Reservoir Regional Park
