= Notre-Dame-de-la-Salette, Quebec =

Notre-Dame-de-la-Salette
- Municipality
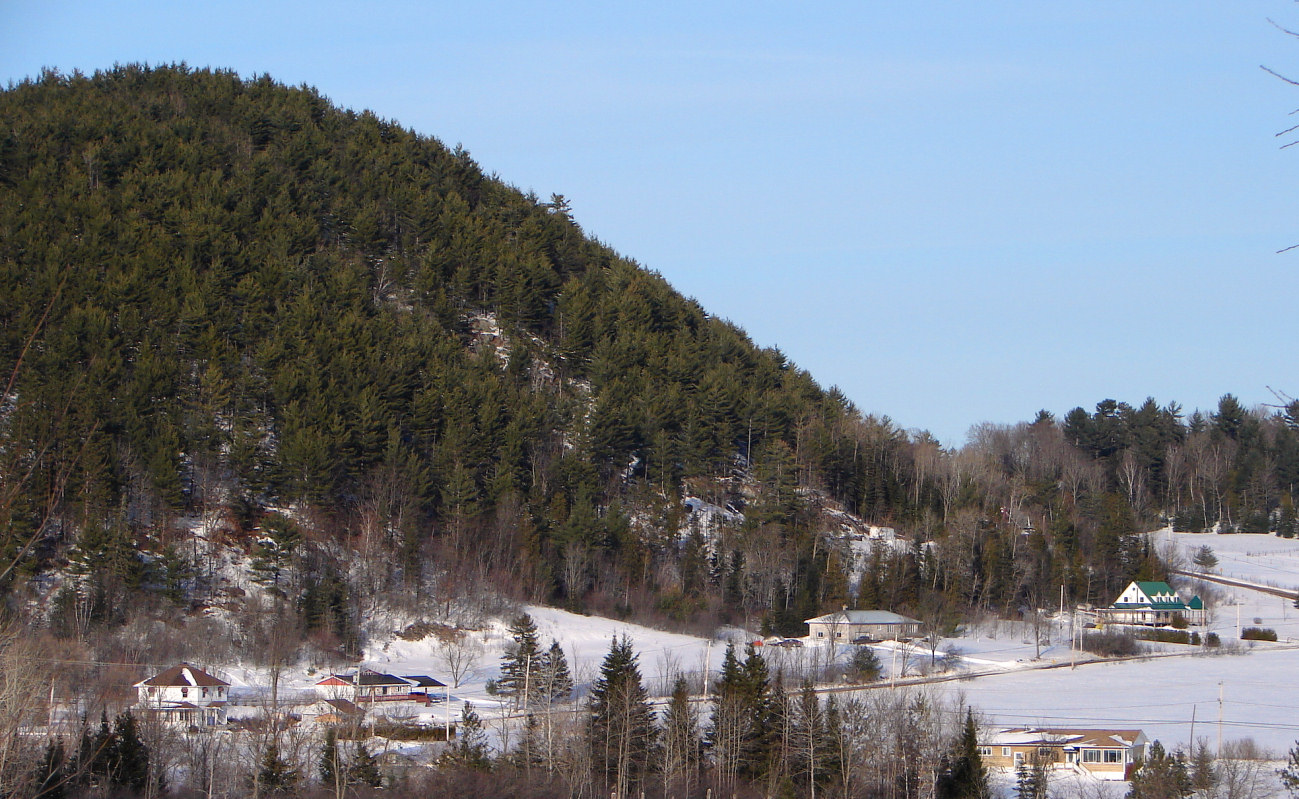

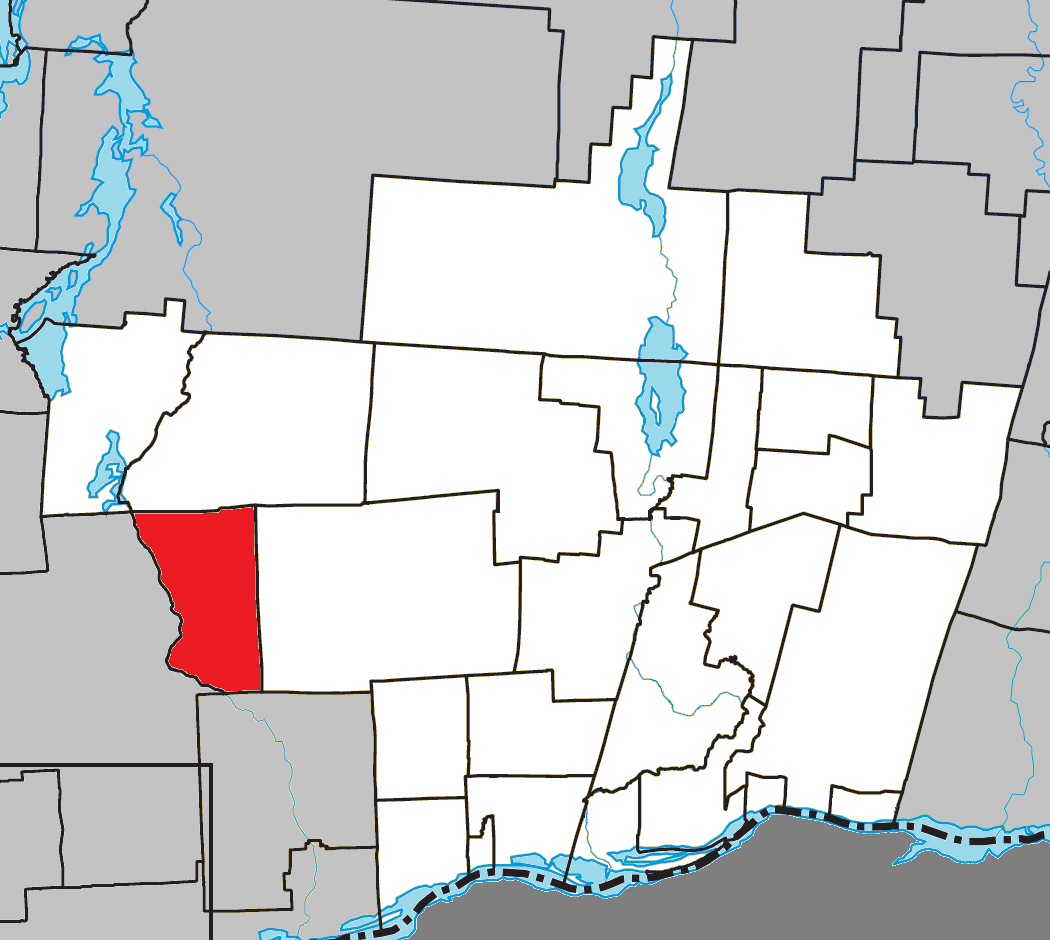
- Location within Papineau RCM

- Location in western Quebec
- Coordinates: 45°46′N 75°35′W
- Country: Canada
- Province: Quebec
- Region: Outaouais
- RCM: Papineau
- Settled: 1845
- Constituted: May 17, 1979

Government
  - Mayor: Antonin Brunet
  - Federal riding: Argenteuil—La Petite-Nation
  - Prov. riding: Papineau

Area
  - Total: 117.10 km^{2} (45.21 sq mi)
  - Land: 115.49 km^{2} (44.59 sq mi)

Population (2021)
  - Total: 841
  - Density: 7.4/km^{2} (19/sq mi)
  - Pop 2016-2021: ▲15.7%
  - Dwellings: 478
- Time zone: UTC−5 (EST)
  - Summer (DST): UTC−4 (EDT)
- Postal code(s): J0X 2L0
- Area code: 819
- Highways: R-309
- Website: www.muni-ndsalette.qc.ca

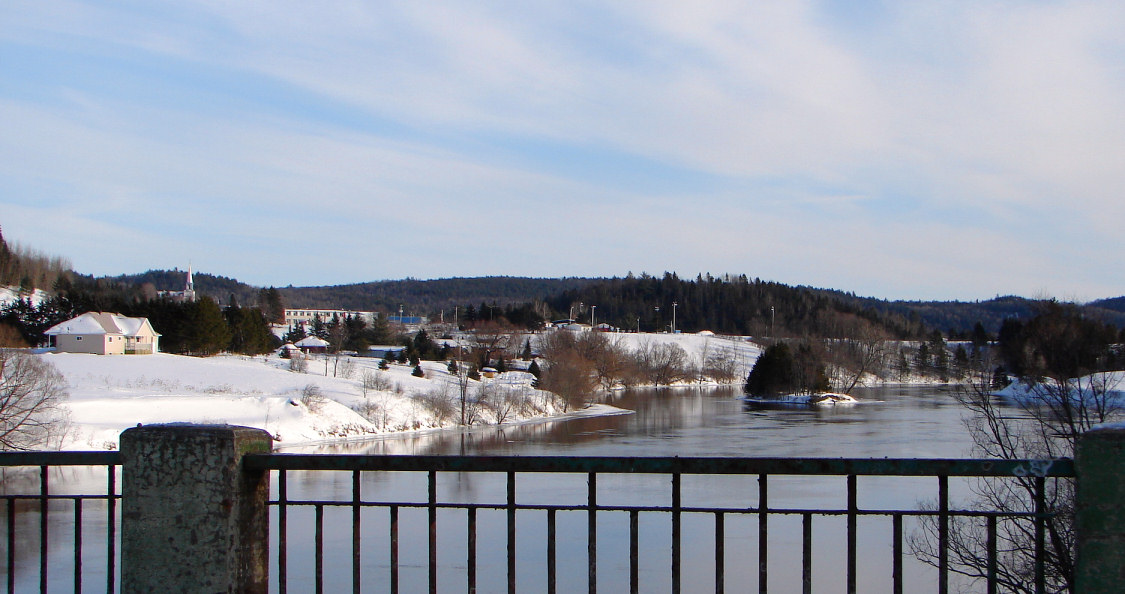
Notre-Dame-de-la-Salette and the Lièvre River.

Notre-Dame-de-la-Salette (French pronunciation: [nɔtʁə dam də la salɛt]) is a municipality in the Outaouais region of Quebec, Canada. It is part of the Papineau Regional County Municipality, straddling the eastern banks of the Lièvre River.

== History ==
In 1841, the Township of Portland, named after the Isle of Portland in Dorset, England, was formed. From 1845 on, it was colonized by Irish and French Canadians, followed by Norwegians in 1860. A year later in 1861, the township was reorganized as a township municipality. A post office followed in 1883. French priests established a parish in 1905, named after the French pilgrimage location Notre-Dame-de-la-Salette.

During the early morning hours of April 26, 1908, a deadly landslide killed at least 34 people while sending 15 homes into the Lievre River including the residence of then-mayor Camille Lapointe. As the river was blocked by mud and land, a wave was sent into the village damaging or destroying several other structures. The toll could have been larger as a few years before the event the closure of a mine forced over 200 families to leave the village. Other major landslides were recorded in the village, twice in 1900 and in 1912 where several key infrastructures were demolished and swept away. A major fire also destroyed a large section of the village in 1903.

In 1966, Portland was renamed to Notre-Dame-de-la-Salette. On January 1, 1975, it was merged into a new City of Buckingham. However, because of public outcry, the merger did not last long. In 1980, Notre-Dame-de-la-Salette regained its municipal autonomy.

On January 1, 2022, Notre-Dame-de-la-Salette was transferred from Les Collines-de-l'Outaouais Regional County Municipality to Papineau Regional County Municipality.

== Demographics ==
Canada census – Notre-Dame-de-la-Salette, Quebec community profile

	2021	2016	2011
Population	841 (15.7% from 2016)	727 (-4.0% from 2011)	757 (-2.2% from 2006)
Land area	113.33 km^{2} (43.76 sq mi)	115.49 km^{2} (44.59 sq mi)	114.30 km^{2} (44.13 sq mi)
Population density	7.4/km^{2} (19/sq mi)	6.3/km^{2} (16/sq mi)	6.6/km^{2} (17/sq mi)
Median age	50.0 (M: 51.2, F: 49.2)	45.7 (M: 44.9, F: 46.7)	47.3 (M: 47.3, F: 47.4)
Private dwellings	478 (total)	473 (total)	447 (total)
Median household income	$70,500	$52,736	$87,509

References: 2021 2016 2011

Historical census populations – Notre-Dame-de-la-Salette, Quebec

Year	Pop.	±%
1976	605	—
1981	568	−6.1%
1986	624	+9.9%
1991	658	+5.4%
1996	678	+3.0%

Year	Pop.	±%
2001	706	+4.1%
2006	774	+9.6%
2011	757	−2.2%
2016	727	−4.0%
2021	841	+15.7%

Mother tongue:

- English as first language: 6.0%
- French as first language: 91.1%
- English and French as first language: 1.8%
- Other as first language: 1.8%

== See also ==
- List of municipalities in Quebec
