= Lac-des-Écorces, Quebec (former unorganized territory) =

Coordinates: 45°53′38″N 75°18′42″W

Lac-des-Écorces (French pronunciation: [lak dez‿ekɔʁs]) was a former unorganized territory in the Outaouais region of Quebec, Canada.

On October 10, 1998, it was split up between Duhamel and Montpellier and ceased to exist.
