= Kiamika, Quebec =

Kiamika
- Municipality
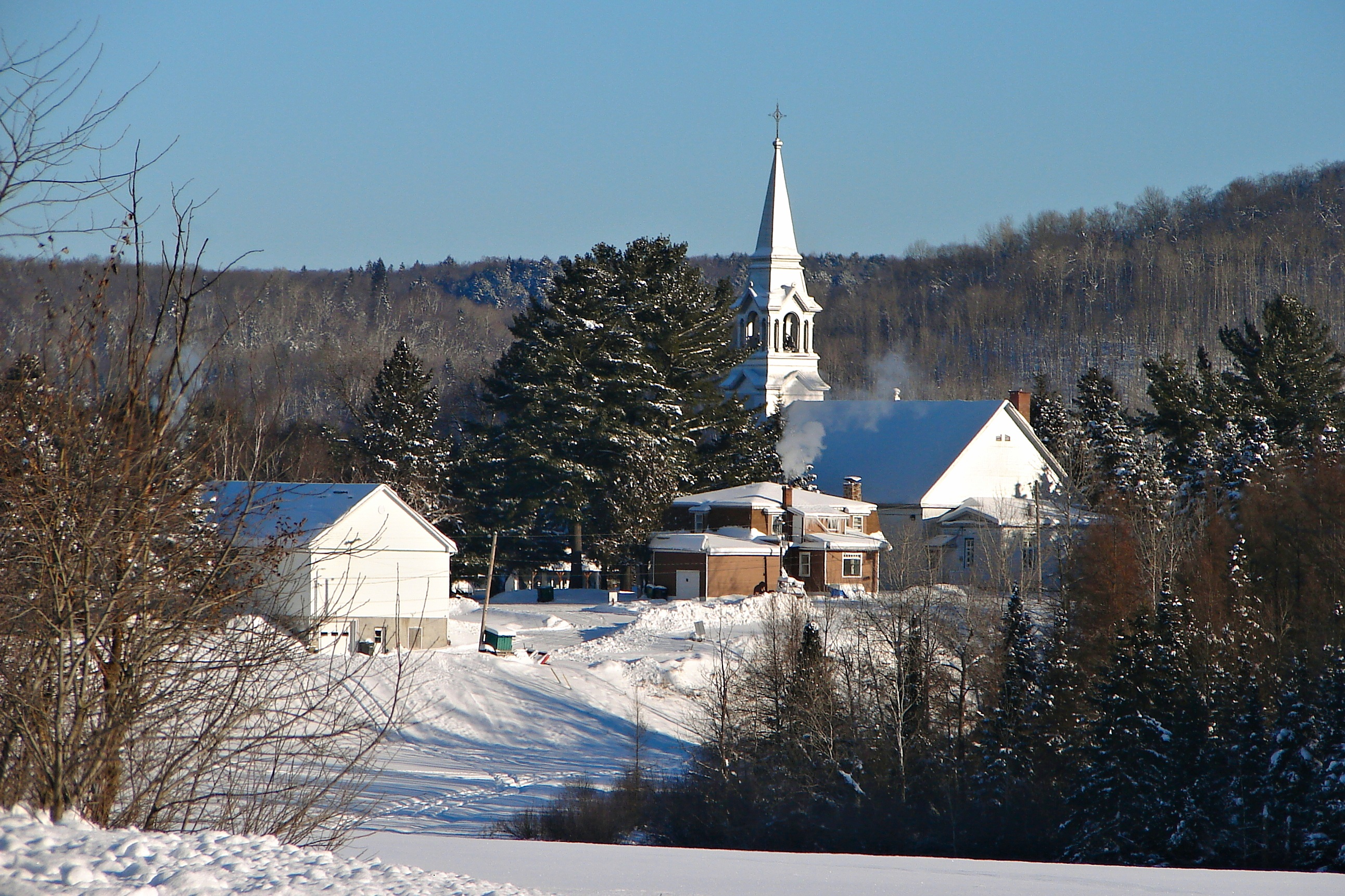
- Motto: Quel coup de cœur!
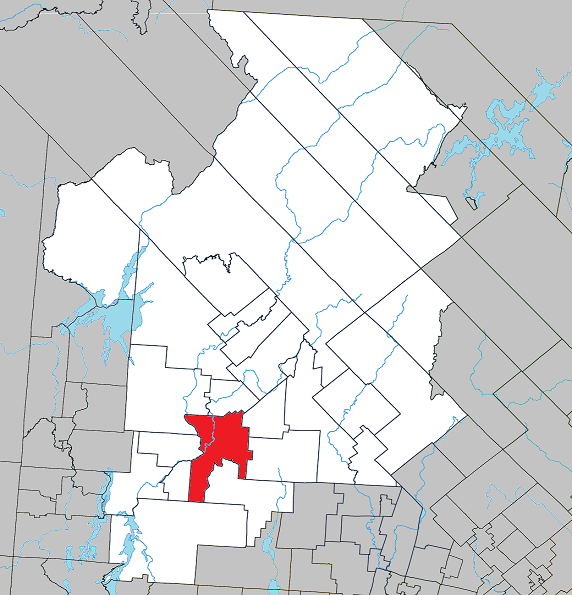
- Location within Antoine-Labelle RCM

- Location in central Quebec
- Coordinates: 46°25′N 75°23′W
- Country: Canada
- Province: Quebec
- Region: Laurentides
- RCM: Antoine-Labelle
- Settled: 1860s
- Constituted: January 3, 1898

Government
  - Mayor: Michel Dion
  - Federal riding: Laurentides—Labelle
  - Prov. riding: Labelle

Area
  - Total: 362.94 km^{2} (140.13 sq mi)
  - Land: 337.53 km^{2} (130.32 sq mi)

Population (2021)
  - Total: 790
  - Density: 2.3/km^{2} (6.0/sq mi)
  - Pop. (2016-21): ▲4.4%
  - Dwellings: 508
- Time zone: UTC−5 (EST)
  - Summer (DST): UTC−4 (EDT)
- Postal code(s): J0W 1G0
- Area code: 819
- Highways: R-311
- Website: www.kiamika.ca

Kiamika is a municipality in the Laurentides region of Quebec, Canada, part of the Antoine-Labelle Regional County Municipality.

Joseph Montferrand (1802–1864), a logger of imposing stature and extraordinary physical strength, was from Kiamika.

The municipality is named after the Kiamika River, which flows through its territory and is a tributary of the Lièvre River. This name, mentioned by Stanislas Drapeau as Kiamica and appearing on a map of Quebec by Eugène Taché from 1870, comes from the Algonquin word kickiamika meaning 'steep cut below the water', from kicki ('steep cut') and amick ('below the water').

However, an alternate meaning may be 'deep and quiet river', from the roots kiam ('deep') and ka ('quiet').

== History ==
The history of the first occupations of European origin in the territory of Kiamika is part of a regional constant: logging companies were the first to establish themselves there. As early as the 1830s, the Bowman and Bigelow company, established in Buckingham, identified the site of the Rouge Farm, today the surroundings of Siebert Island, as a potential place to establish a forest farm, a vast agricultural operation serving to feed the loggers and animals on the surrounding sites. This will be the first instance of permanent settlement in the Kiamika area.

The presence of the Red Farm will motivate the subsequent establishment of settlers nearby. These settlers, the Thériaults and the Valiquettes, came to establish themselves there on their own initiative as private settlers. However, this situation changed in the 1880s. The Société de colonization de Montarville, founded in 1883 by the deputy for Chambly, Pierre-Basile Benoit, looked at the future municipality of Kiamika and identified it as a site with strong potential for colonization, citing in particular the agrarian successes of the Red Farm as an argument. The Company approaches the government with the project and, after discussion, the latter is granted the management of colonization in the canton of Kiamika, in exchange for which the government undertakes to open a path between La Lièvre and Nominingue.

In 1883, the Colonization Society of Montarville was founded and took possession of the area in 1884. On the banks of the Lièvre River, about 11 kilometres (6.8 mi) south of Val-Barrette, settlers established the mission of Saint-Gérard-de-Kiamika, also called Saint-Gérard-de-Montarville. A year later its post office opened. In 1890, the Kiamika Township was proclaimed.

From then on, the Company's mission was to establish agricultural and industrial establishments on unestablished lands in the canton of Kiamika. For the first two years of its existence, it only granted lots to its members, most of whom were from Chambly County. But in 1885, faced with the low number of members applying for lot concessions, the Society expanded the program to non-members.

The same year, the Quebec government completed the construction of Chapleau Road which connects Nominingue to Kiamika. Colonization then exploded on the Lièvre River. Unfortunately for Kiamika, although established before, it is Rapide-de-l'Orignal, the future town of Mont-Laurier, which will mainly benefit from this colonization movement.

However, settlement continued in Kiamika and from the end of the 20th century the inhabitants of the village took steps to bring Kiamika into the modernity of the time. Requests are being made to the Archbishop of Ottawa, Mgr. Duhamel, so that a priest would be installed in the village and a church would be built there. Even if these requests began in 1888, it was not until 1898 that a first resident priest was installed there, Father Joseph-Aimé Lemonde, and another four years, i.e. 1902, for the church to be completed. Kiamika is then officially a parish.

The year of the arrival of priest Lemonde, 1898, also marked the year of the official foundation of the municipality of Kiamika. The same year as the construction of the church, 1902, a first school board was formed to manage the village school and the local schools. Entering the 21st century, the small town of Kiamika is now officially a village in its own right with its parish, municipal status and public institutions.

From its origins, the village's economy has been focused on the forestry industry. The first sawmill in the Haute-Lièvre region was opened near the village by Victor Dufort, in 1886, and the first years of development saw the birth of several other sawmills, jobber sites (subcontractors of forestry companies). and lumber shops. The economic crisis of 1929 put a brake on this rapid development and, worse, caused a decline in the forestry economy in the decades that followed.

As with many other villages in the Hautes-Laurentides, this collapse of the forestry industry is forcing the municipality to diversify its economy towards the tourism sector. Although developments in the sector were slow in the 1930s and 1940s, they accelerated from the 1950s, driven by the rise in popularity of cars and vacations. Several outfitters, established in the area in the first half of the 20th century, exploded in popularity. The inhabitants of Kiamika find employment there to maintain the chalets or serve as hunting and fishing guides for customers. Very quickly, the tourism industry became an economic hub for the locality.

Since then, the municipality of Kiamika has continued to maintain this vocation halfway between forestry and tourism. Several forestry companies are still in operation there and the tourism industry is still doing well, the municipality having 823 permanent residents compared to 1,500 seasonal residents.

In 1994, the township municipality changed its statutes to become a regular municipality.

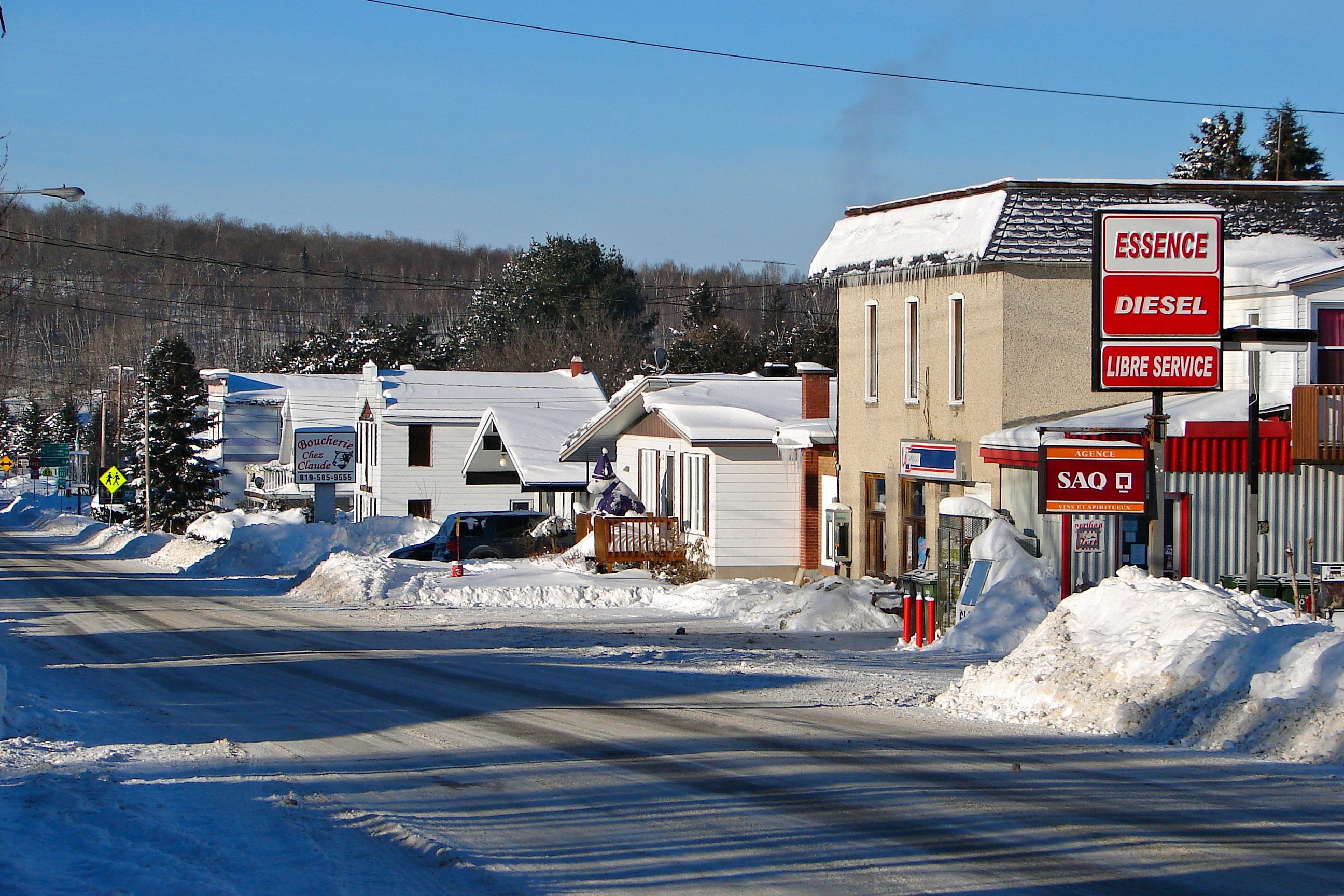
Main street (Rue Principale) in Kiamika

== Demographics ==
Canada census – Kiamika community profile

| | 2021 | 2016 | 2011 |
| Population | 790 (+4.4% from 2016) | 757 (-1.9% from 2011) | 772 (-0.9% from 2006) |
| Land area | 337.53 km^{2} (130.32 sq mi) | 339.92 km^{2} (131.24 sq mi) | 339.89 km^{2} (131.23 sq mi) |
| Population density | 2.3/km^{2} (6.0/sq mi) | 2.2/km^{2} (5.7/sq mi) | 2.3/km^{2} (6.0/sq mi) |
| Median age | 57.6 (M: 58.0, F: 57.2) | 53.9 (M: 54.0, F: 53.9) | 52.1 (M: 53.2, F: 51.3) |
| Private dwellings | 508 (total) 391 (occupied) | 508 (total) 358 (occupied) | 482 (total) |
| Median household income | $58,800 | $51,712 | $47,162 |

References: 2021 2016 2011

Historical census populations – Kiamika, Quebec

| Year | Pop. | ±% |
|---|---|---|
| 1901 | 370 | — |
| 1911 | 650 | +75.7% |
| 1921 | 759 | +16.8% |
| 1931 | 742 | −2.2% |
| 1941 | 888 | +19.7% |
| 1951 | 877 | −1.2% |
| 1956 | 814 | −7.2% |

| Year | Pop. | ±% |
|---|---|---|
| 1961 | 737 | −9.5% |
| 1966 | 623 | −15.5% |
| 1971 | 566 | −9.1% |
| 1976 | 504 | −11.0% |
| 1981 | 571 | +13.3% |
| 1986 | 591 | +3.5% |
| 1991 | 636 | +7.6% |

| Year | Pop. | ±% |
|---|---|---|
| 1996 | 722 | +13.5% |
| 2001 | 716 | −0.8% |
| 2006 | 779 | +8.8% |
| 2011 | 772 | −0.9% |
| 2016 | 757 | −1.9% |
| 2021 | 790 | +4.4% |

Source: Statistics Canada

Mother tongue (2021):

- English as first language: 1.9%
- French as first language: 97.5%
- English and French as first language: 0%
- Other as first language: 0%

== See also ==
- List of municipalities in Quebec
