= Kiamika Reservoir Regional Park =

Protected area in Lanaudière, Quebec, Canada

- Location within Quebec
- Location: Canada, Quebec, Laurentides, Antoine-Labelle Regional County Municipality
- Nearest town: Lac-Douaire
- Coordinates: 46.67278°N 75.09°W
- Area: 184 square kilometres (71 sq mi)
- Website: reservoirkiamika.org

The Kiamika Reservoir Regional Park (in French: Parc régional du Réservoir-Kiamika) is a regional park located in the unorganized territory of Lac-Douaire and the municipalities of Chute-Saint-Phillipe, Lac-Saguay (village) and Rivière-Rouge, in the Antoine-Labelle Regional County Municipality, in administrative region of Laurentides, in Quebec, in Canada.

== Geography ==
The park is crossed by the Kiamika River, a tributary of the Lièvre River. The park covers an area that looks like a misshapen rectangle.

This park includes entirely the Kiamika Reservoir, as well as Lac aux Bleuets and Lac Fraser.

== Kiamika Reservoir ==
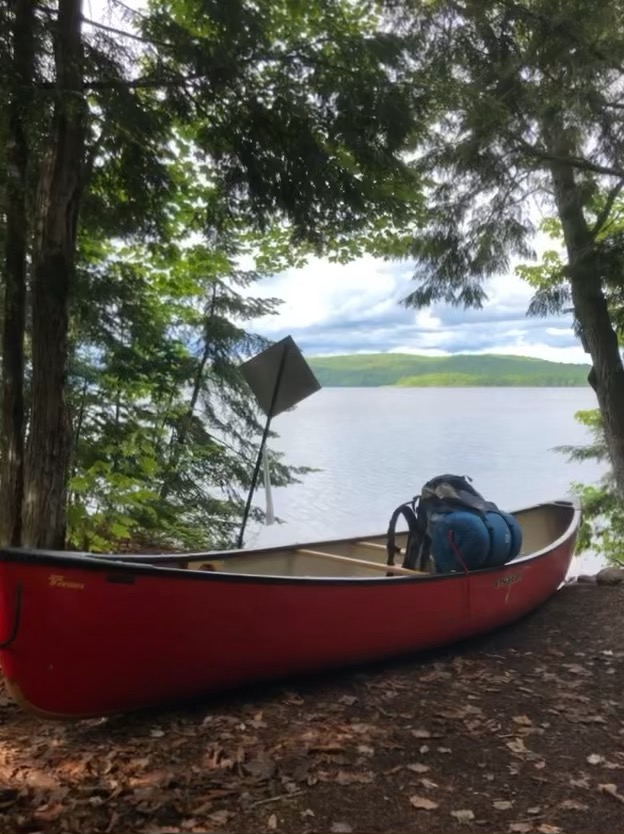
Canoe camping on the reservoir

The Kiamika, meaning "steep rock", has an area of 52 kilometres (32.31 mi). The regional park of which it is part has an area of 184.8 kilometres (114.83 mi). The "Île de la Perdrix Blanche", like the "small island of La Perdrix", are the two main islands of the reservoir and the largest in Kiamika. They measure 11.7 kilometres (7.27 mi) and 5.4 kilometres (3.36 mi) respectively. The reservoir may see its area decrease to 35 kilometres (21.75 mi) during the emptying normally carried out in April. This large tidal range exposes sandy beaches on the shores and connects the two main islands.

Originally, the reservoir consisted of two lakes, Upper and Lower Kiamika Lakes. In 1952, work related to flood control of the Lièvre and Outaouais rivers for the production of electricity created the reservoir, with the erection of the Kiamika dam ordered by the Maclaren company. This work was also carried out to facilitate logging on the Kiamika River. The Kiamika reservoir then becomes the third largest water point in the region.

== History of the Regional Park ==
During the 1990s, the municipalities bordering the reservoir became fully aware of the tourism development potential of this sector. Stakeholders proposed, to acquire better knowledge of the territory, a study by various institutions and organizations (municipalities, development corporation, private companies and the Quebec government ministry). In 2003, a study aimed at identifying the different potentials of the natural environment for future interpretation purposes was carried out by the Société de la fauna et des parcs du Québec.

The Kiamika Reservoir Regional Park is a creation of the Government of Quebec and is managed locally by the Kiamika Reservoir Development Corporation, the SDRK, as well as by the County Municipality of Antoine-Labelle (MRCAL).

== Hydrography ==
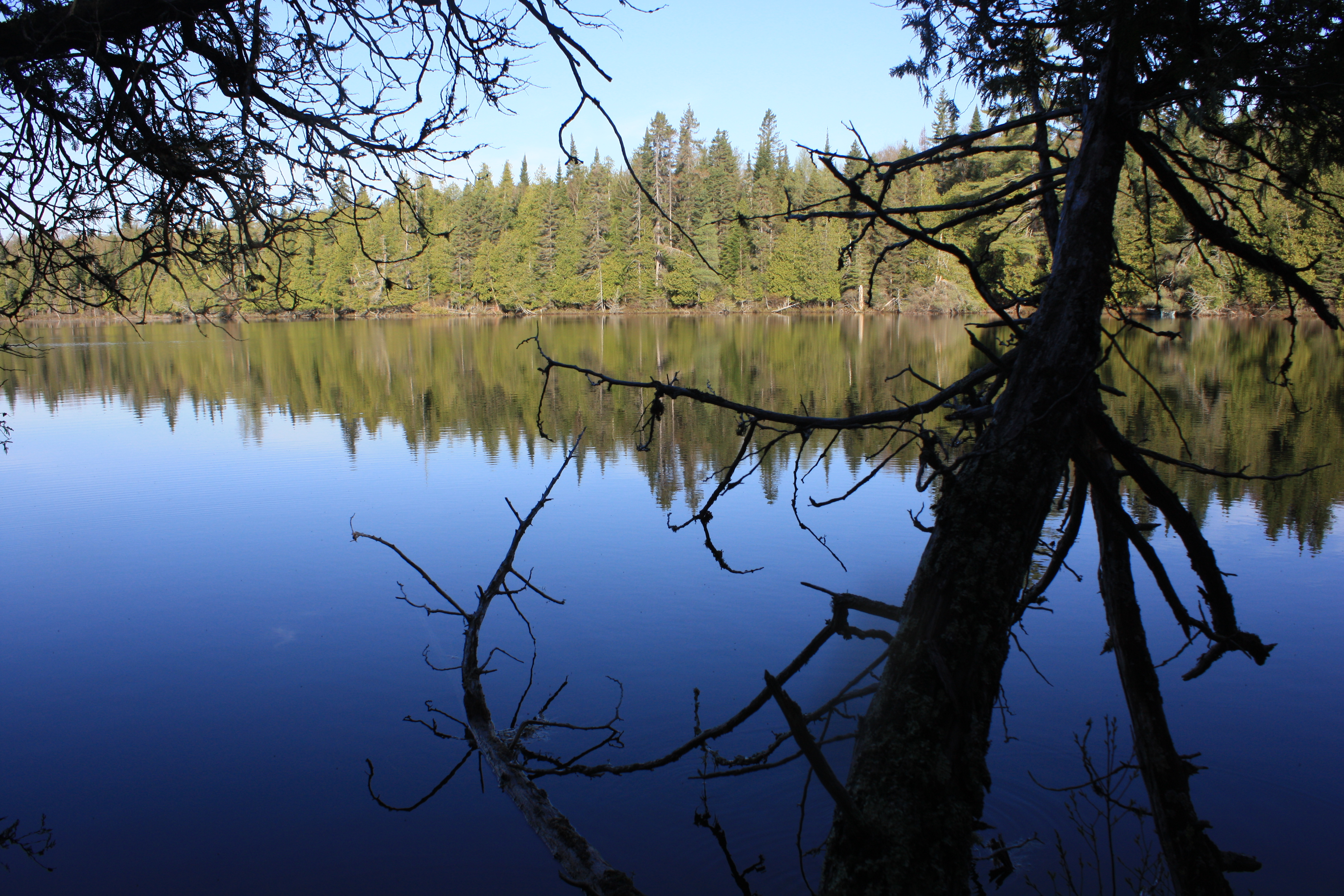
Kiamika reservoir regional park

Aside from the reservoir, Kiamika Regional Park has several other lakes on its territory. Three lakes are present on the island of La Perdrix Blanche and another on the small island of La Perdrix. These lakes are the result of the flooding of small areas by beavers, which thus blocked the flow of small streams.

The water level in the reservoir is subject to several variations throughout the year. The regulation of the water level is under the authority of the Ministry of Sustainable Development, the Environment and the Fight against Climate Change (MDDELCC), through the administrative unit of the Center d'Expertise Hydrique du Quebec (CEHQ). This unit ensures the regularization of the water regime by operating public dams, such as the Kiamika dam. It ensures the safety of dams and the maintenance of the integrity of these infrastructures.

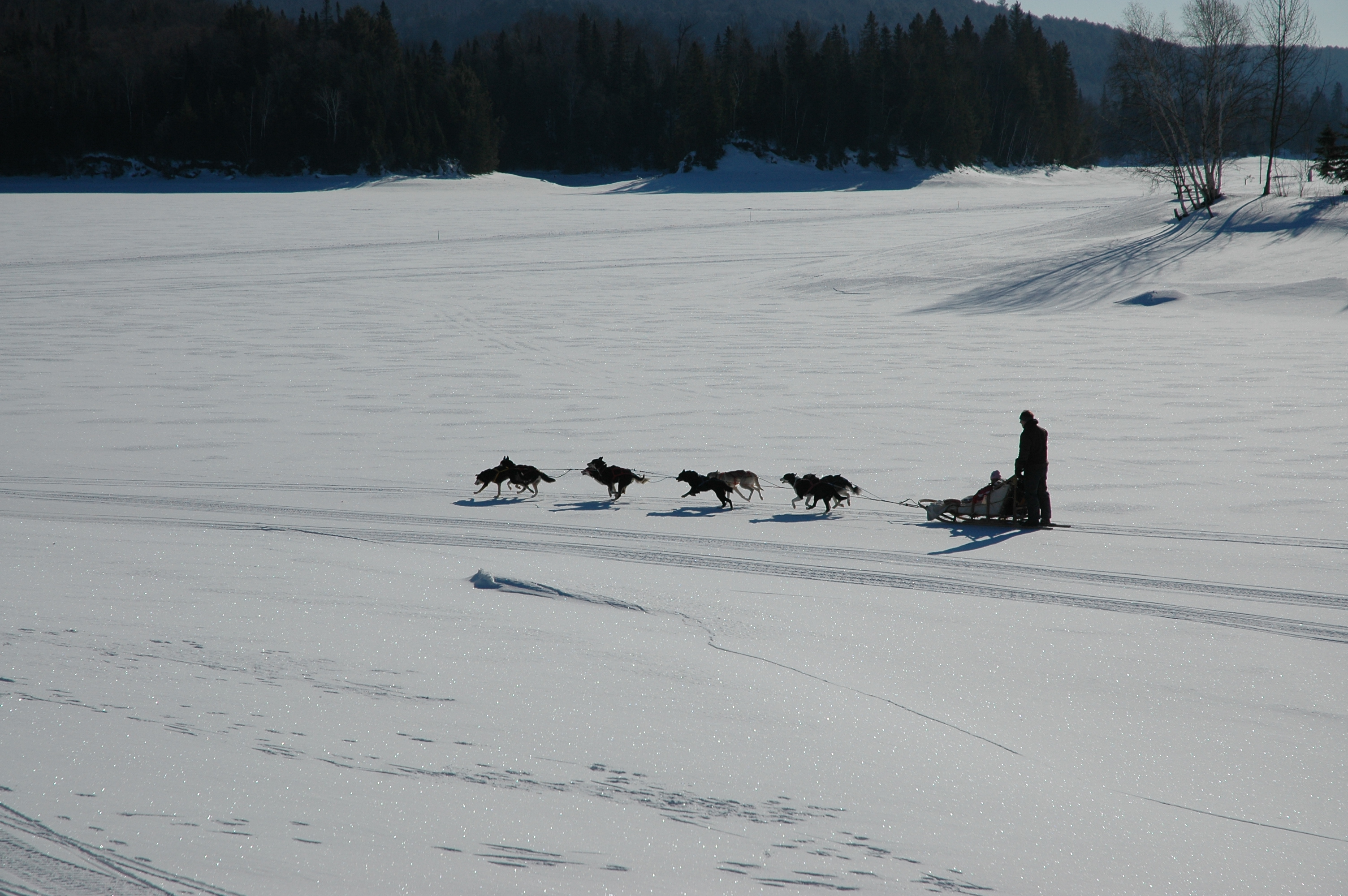
Kiamika Reservoir Regional Park

== Climate ==
The Kiamika reservoir is located northwest of the St. Lawrence River, far from any marine or estuarine influence. This region has a humid continental climate where significant temperature variations as well as significant annual precipitation have been recorded. The annual average temperature is approximately 3.0 ± 2.1 °C. During July, daily highs of 25 °C can be experienced. In January, daily lows of −21.3 °C were recorded. A total difference of 46.3 °C is therefore observed annually. More millimeters of rain fall in the reservoir area than millimeters of snow. Annual precipitation averages 1092.2 mm. About 1536.9-degree-days per year allow plant growth (+ 5 °C).

== Relief ==
The territory of the regional park is in the geological province of Grenville (Canadian Shield). The bedrock is made up of paragneiss and covered with undifferentiated deposits (till) from the last glaciation. These deposits are observable on slopes of 15% or less. On slopes of 15 to 30%, the bedrock is rather exposed.

On average, the altitude for the 2 main islands of the reservoir is 300 m. The highest peak is located on the island of Perdrix Blanche, with an altitude of 400 m. The relief of the islands is rather rugged.

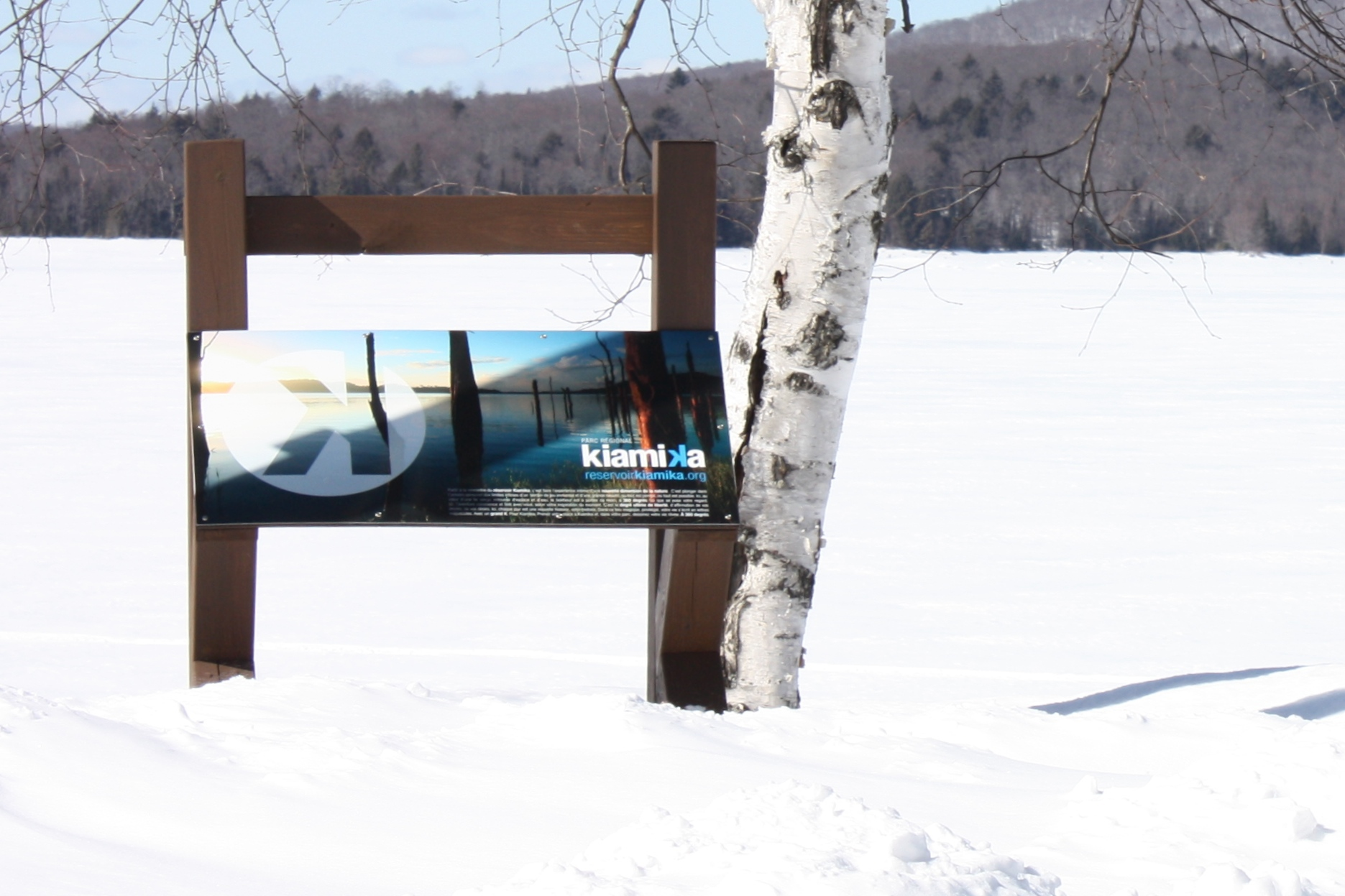
Kiamika Reservoir Regional Park

== Fauna and flora ==
Located in the deciduous forest subzone of the northern temperate zone, the Kiamika reservoir offers a predominantly leafy landscape.

Several types of forest species can be observed in the regional park such as sugar maple (Acer saccharum), yellow birch (Betula alleghaniensis), red oak (Quercus rubra), beech (Fagus grandifolia), etc. There are a total of 27 tree varieties, 18 of which have been recorded on the island of White Perdrix. Different types of forest stands have been identified. However, it is the maple-yellow birch grove that is the most represented.

The Îles de la Perdrix and Île Rouge are part of the proposed biodiversity reserve established in 2008. An exceptional forest ecosystem (EFE) of 157 hectares is also present on Île de la Perdrix Blanche. It is a maple, yellow birch and large-leaved beech forest that is at least 175 years old. This forest, which has never undergone any major natural or anthropogenic disturbance, is classified as an old forest.

In late June, early July, blue irises (Iris versicolor) are in bloom and abundant at the eastern end of the channel between the two main islands.

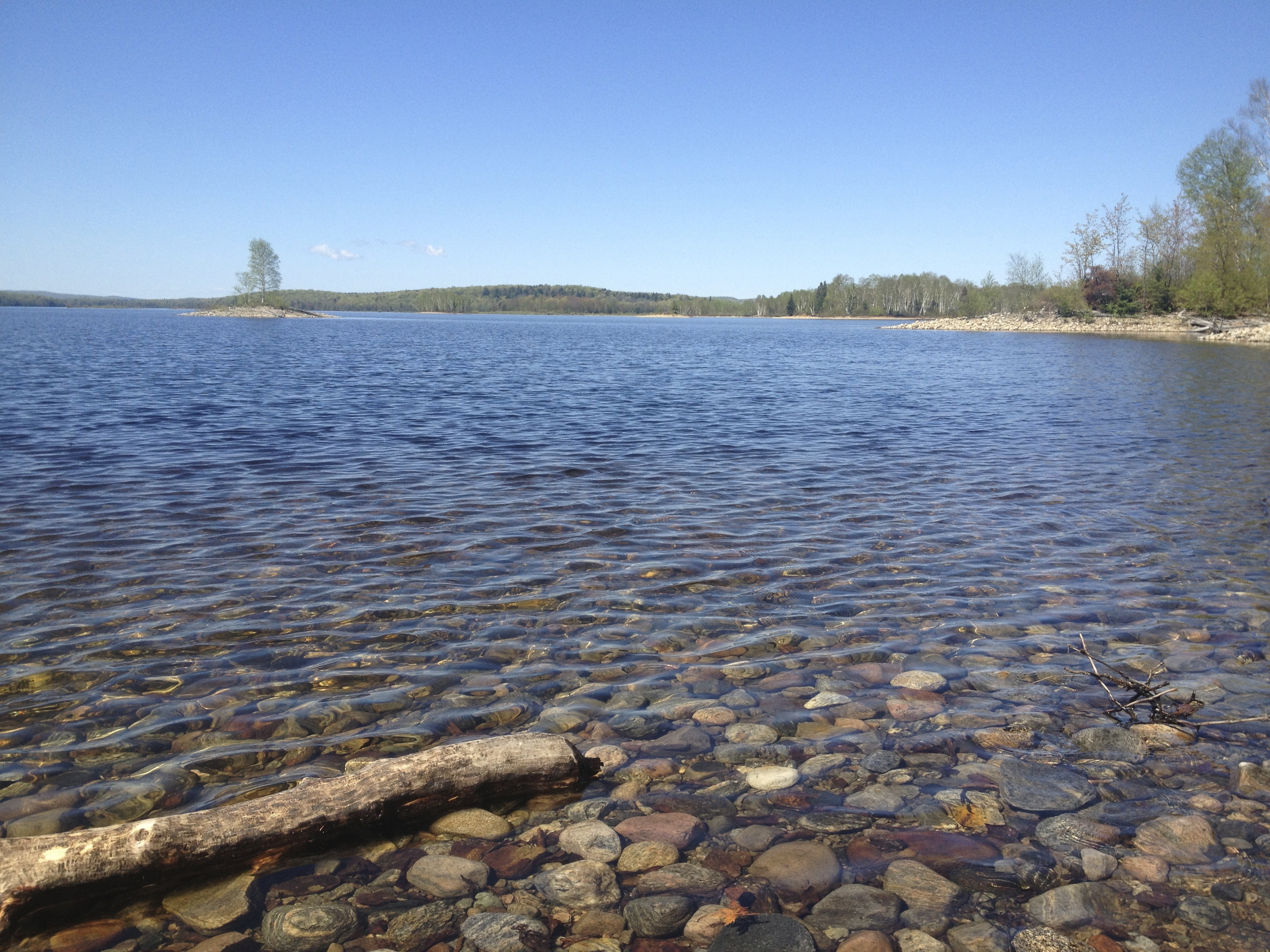
Kiamika Reservoir Regional Park

These forests are also home to 71 species of birds. The migration period, in the spring, is the peak period for observing a large number of species. A heronry has already been recorded on the island of the White Perdrix, but it is no longer used today.

The southern and western sectors of the reservoir are places where we find a high density of white-tailed deer (Odocoileus virginianus) in winter. This sector could be a major expansion of the ravages of Lake David. Signs of the presence of this animal on the two islands of the Perdrix are easily perceptible. Concerning the islands, there are also signs of the presence of black bears (Ursus americanus) and moose (Alces alces). However, their presence is fortuitous, these species are found rather on the continent. The gray wolf (Canis lupus) and the red fox (Vulpes vulpes) are also among the species found on the partridge islands.

With regard to herpetofauna, five species of frogs, two species of tree frog, four species of salamanders, one species of toad and one species of snake have been recorded on the Perdrix Islands.

Three streams have been included in the MRCAL development plan as being of ecological interest due to their wildlife habitat characteristics. These are the streams of Cornes (whose mouth has been designated a fishing sanctuary, therefore fishing prohibited), Castelneau and Bleuets Ouest.
