= Kiamika River =

Rivers of Laurentides, in Quebec, Canada

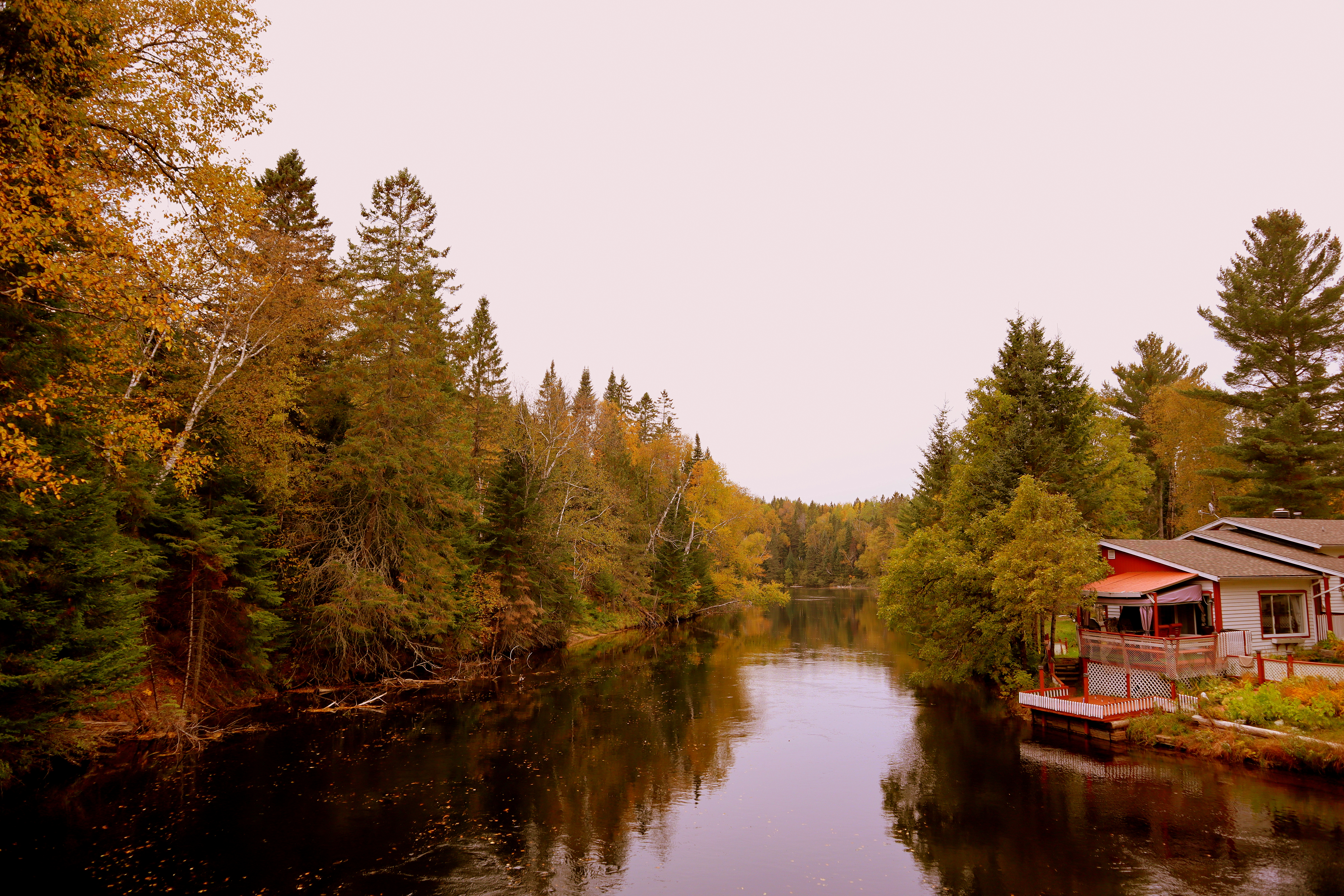

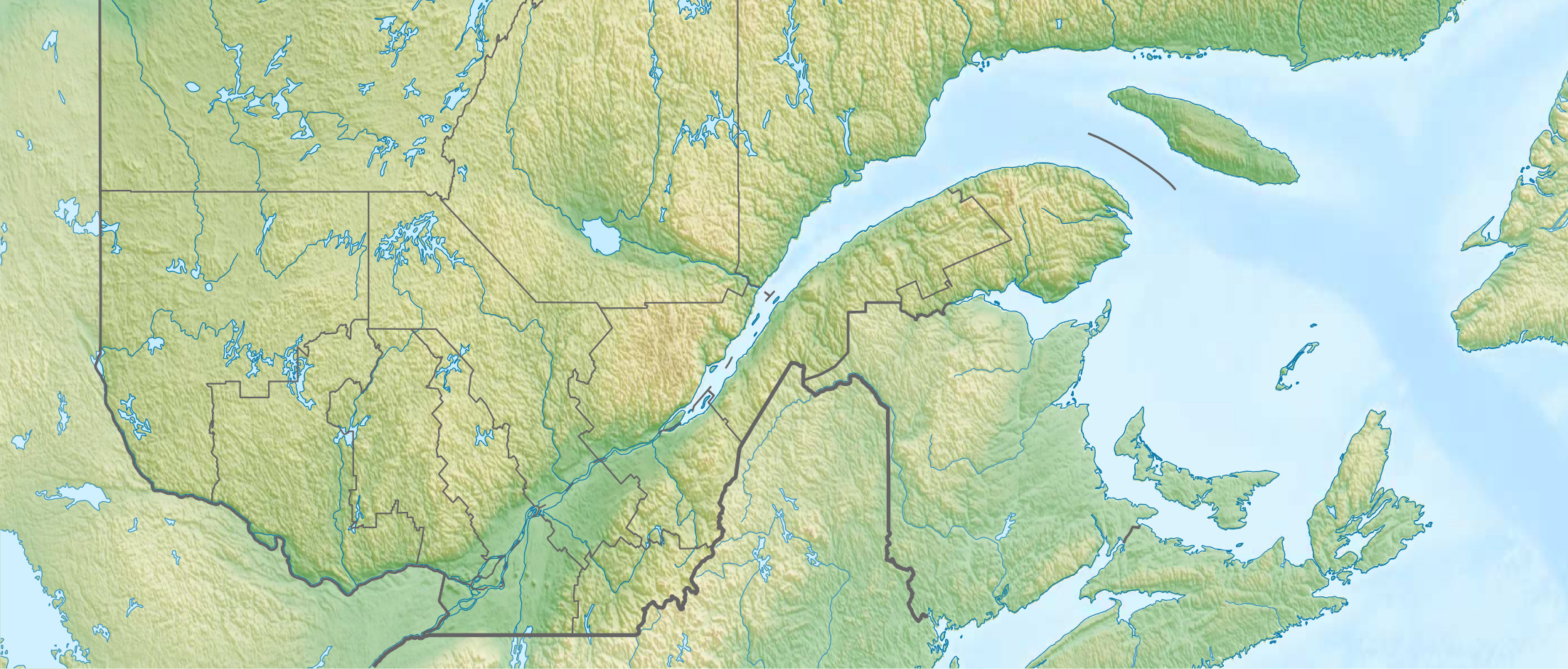
- Location within Quebec South
- Native name: Rivière Kiamika (French)

Location
- Country: Canada
- Province: Quebec
- Region: Laurentides
- MRC: Antoine-Labelle Regional County Municipality

Physical characteristics
- Source: Lac du Bouleau Blanc
  - location: Lac-Oscar
  - coordinates: 46°54′26″N 74°48′39″W
- Mouth: Lièvre River
  - location: Kiamika
  - coordinates: 46°23′04″N 75°24′44″W

Basin features
- Progression: Lièvre River→ Ottawa River→ Saint Lawrence River

The Kiamika River (in French: rivière Kiamika) is a watercourse in the Antoine-Labelle Regional County Municipality, in the administrative region of Laurentides, in Quebec, in Canada.

Several dams have been erected in order to regulate the flow of the river, in particular on Lake Kiamika. This body of water eventually became a reservoir of 43 kilometres (26.72 mi) in area, with a maximum depth of 46 metres (151 ft). This reservoir has several large islands, some of which were contiguous lands before the submersion.

== History ==
In the 19th century, the first surveyors to cross the region noted in their reports that the waters of this river were relatively canoeable and warm. They underlined the perceived milder microclimate of this valley and referred to the good potential for agriculture and logging. The first logging initiatives in the valley were carried out by the MacLaren Company.

From the end of the 19th century, several pioneers from the south settled in the lower part of the Kiamika valley, looking for new lands. Thanks to these many settlers and their families, the agro-forestry communities of Chute-Saint-Philippe, Lac-des-Écorces, Val-Barrette and Kiamika were erected in Catholic parishes and in municipalities before setting up their respective school boards.

== Toponymy ==
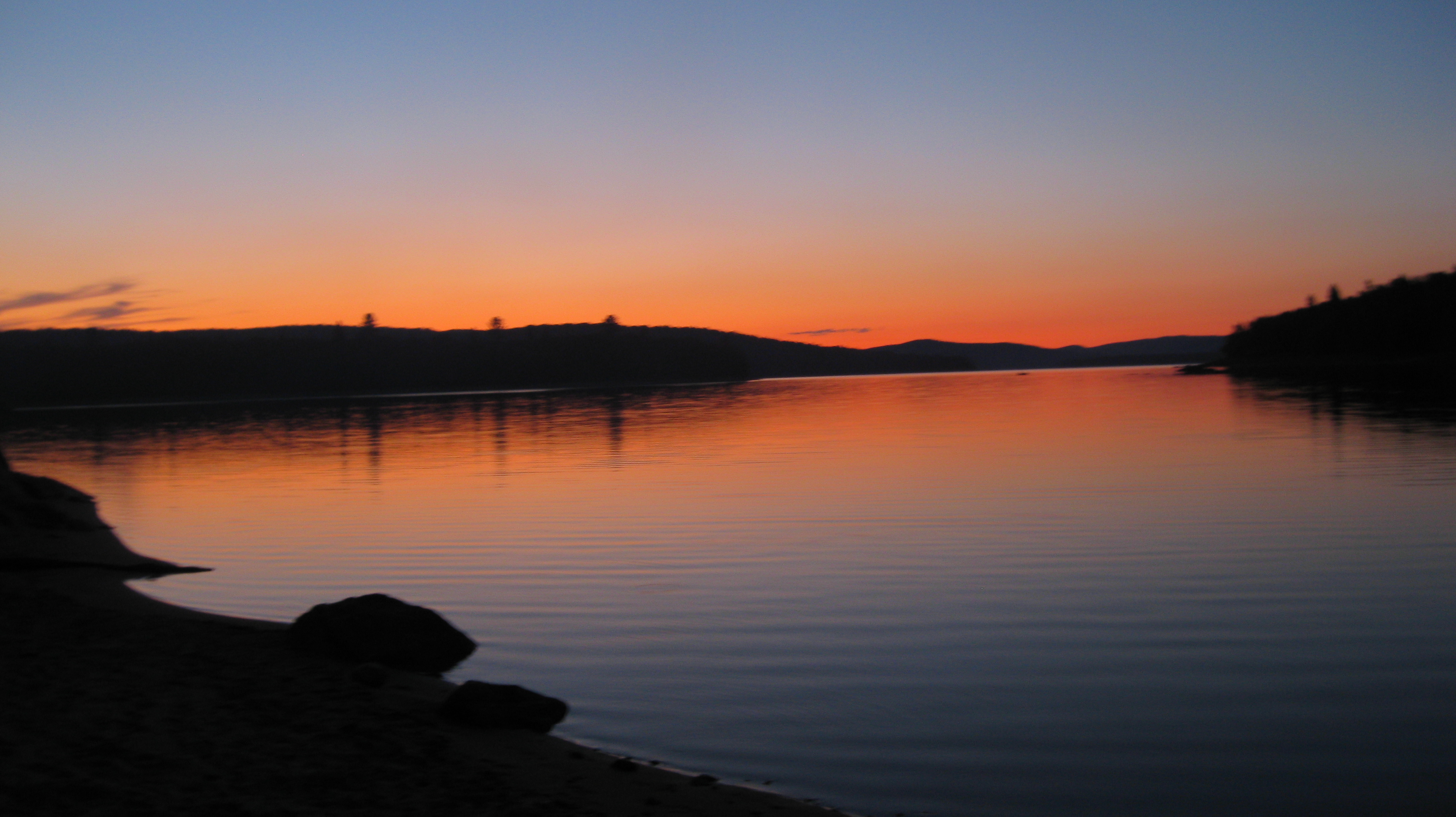
Kiamika Reservoir

In the Algonquin language, the term "Kiamika" means: "steep or cut below the water". In his notes of 1863, Stanislas Drapeau, affirms that the township of Kiamica derives its name from the river, which had probably been so designated for a long time. On the 1891 township map, Petit lac Kiamika was designated Petit lac à l'Écorce. The oldest cartographic spelling of the toponym R. Kiamika appears on a map by Eugène Taché dated 1870.

The toponym Kiamika River was made official on 5 December 1968 at the Place Names Bank of the Commission de toponymie du Québec.

== See also ==
- Lac-Douaire, a TNO
- Lac-Saguay, a municipality
- Kiamika Reservoir Regional Park
- List of rivers of Quebec
