= Lac-des-Écorces =

- Municipality
- Motto: Le beau côté de la vie! (English: "The beautiful side of life!")
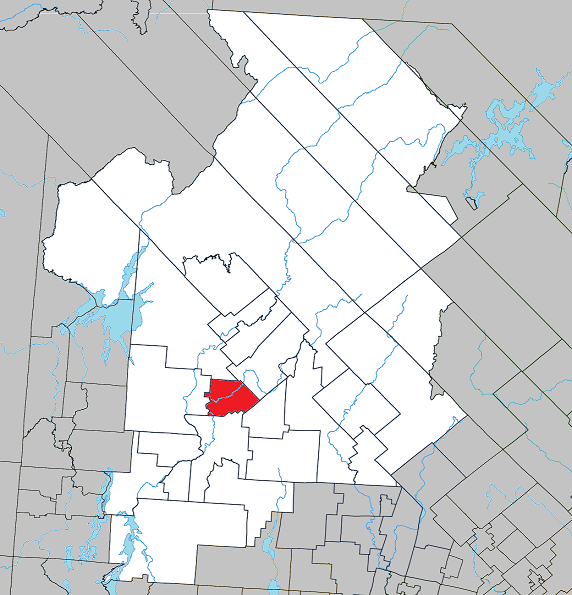
- Location within Antoine-Labelle RCM

- Location in central Quebec
- Coordinates: 46°33′N 75°21′W
- Country: Canada
- Province: Quebec
- Region: Laurentides
- RCM: Antoine-Labelle
- Settled: 1890s
- Constituted: October 10, 2002

Government
  - Mayor: Pierre Flamand
  - Federal riding: Laurentides—Labelle
  - Prov. riding: Labelle

Area
  - Total: 155.85 km^{2} (60.17 sq mi)
  - Land: 144.30 km^{2} (55.71 sq mi)

Population (2021)
  - Total: 2,885
  - Density: 20/km^{2} (52/sq mi)
  - Pop. 2016-2021: ▲5.5%
  - Dwellings: 1,669
- Time zone: UTC−5 (EST)
  - Summer (DST): UTC−4 (EDT)
- Postal code(s): J0W 1H0 & J0W 1Y0
- Area code(s): 819
- Highways: R-117 (TCH) R-311
- Website: www.lacdesecorces.ca

Lac-des-Écorces (French pronunciation: [lak dez‿ekɔʁs]) is a municipality and village in the Laurentides region of Quebec, Canada, part of the Antoine-Labelle Regional County Municipality.

It is named after Bark Lake (Lac des Écorces) that is on its western boundary.

== History ==
On October 10, 2002, the Municipality of Beaux-Rivages, the Village of Lac-des-Écorces, and the Village of Val-Barrette merged to form the new Municipality of Beaux-Rivages–Lac-des-Écorces–Val-Barrette. On June 21, 2003, it changed to its current name.

=== Campbell-Partie-Est / Lac-des-Écorces / Beaux-Rivages ===
But originally these three municipalities were part of one entity, the Township Municipality of Campbell-Partie-Est. This was created in 1911 by separating from the rest of Campbell Township (now part of Mont-Laurier), which in turn was proclaimed in 1899 and named after Sir Alexander Campbell (1822-1892).

In 1914, Val-Barrette was split off from Campbell-Partie-Est and became a separate incorporated village. In 1953, Campbell-Partie-Est was renamed to Lac-des-Écorces. In 1955, its main settlement became an independent incorporated village, also called Lac-des-Écorces. In 1984, the township was renamed again, this time to Beaux-Rivages (French for "Beautiful Shores"), a reference to the beauty of the shores of Bark Lake and that of the many other lakes dotting the territory.

=== Val-Barrette ===
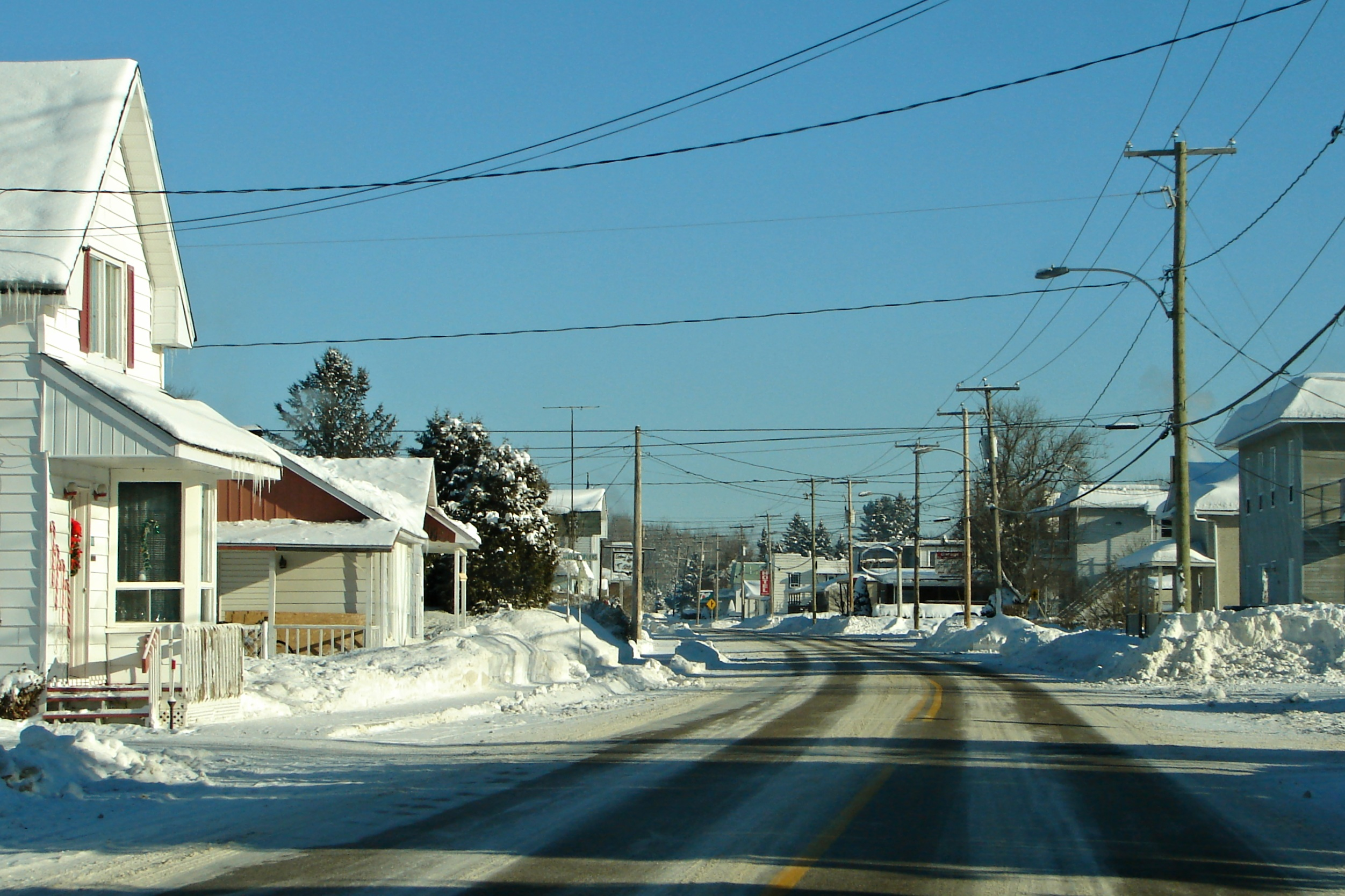
Val-Barrette

Thomas Brunet from Thurso is considered the first settler in Val-Barrette who arrived in 1894. But it is named after Zéphirin Barrette, one of the first local land owners. He arrived here in late 1908, and built a hotel and gave the land to build the church. After the settlement became an incorporated village, he became its first mayor (1914-1915), served as the first postmaster (1909-1920), and was the first president of the school board.

Its post office opened in 1909. In 1912, the mission of Saint-Joseph-de-Val-Barrette was founded and became a parish in 1916. Formerly dependent on vegetable crops, wool production, and sawing wood, its economy turns more now toward tourism. Found at this location is one of the largest fish culture stations in Quebec, focusing on raising trout.

== Demographics ==
Canada census – Lac-des-Écorces community profile

| | 2021 | 2016 | 2011 |
| Population | 2,885 (+5.5% from 2016) | 2,734 (+0.8% from 2011) | 2,713 (-5.9% from 2006) |
| Land area | 144.30 km^{2} (55.71 sq mi) | 144.90 km^{2} (55.95 sq mi) | 144.32 km^{2} (55.72 sq mi) |
| Population density | 20/km^{2} (52/sq mi) | 18.9/km^{2} (49/sq mi) | 18.8/km^{2} (49/sq mi) |
| Median age | 50.0 (M: 49.6, F: 50.4) | 48.4 (M: 48.8, F: 48.1) | 46.6 (M: 46.1, F: 47.1) |
| Private dwellings | 1,669 (total) 1,363 (occupied) | 1,649 (total) | 1,585 (total) |
| Median household income | $60,800 | $47,915 | $43,980 |

References: 2021 2016 2011

Historical census populations – Lac-des-Écorces, Quebec
| Year | Pop. | ±% |
|---|---|---|
| 2006 | 2,884 | — |
| 2011 | 2,713 | −5.9% |
| 2016 | 2,734 | +0.8% |
| 2021 | 2,885 | +5.5% |
Source: Statistics Canada

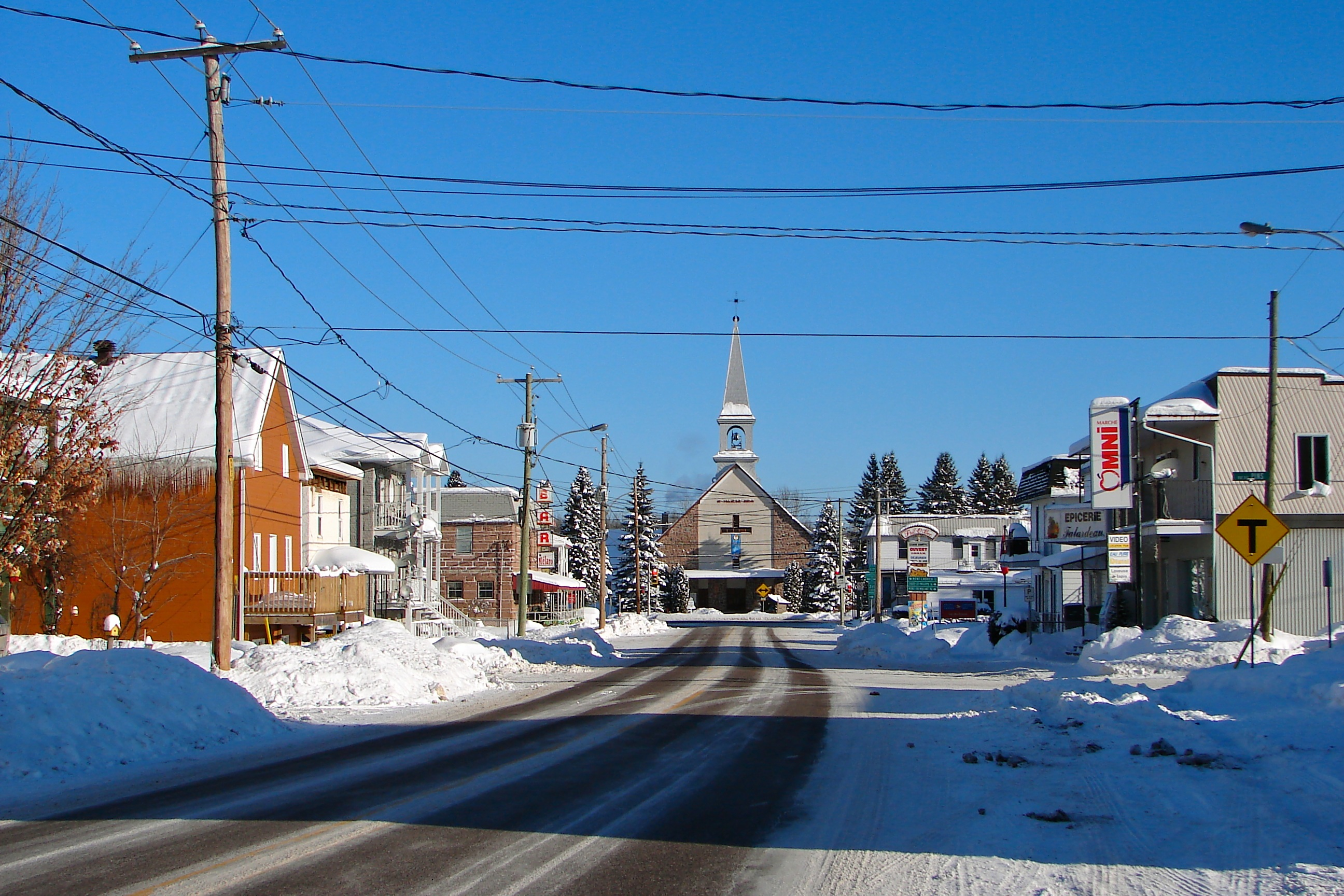
Avenue de l'Église

Population prior to amalgamation:

- Population total in 2001: 2715
  - Municipality of Beaux-Rivages: 1192
  - Village of Lac-des-Écorces: 911
  - Village of Val-Barrette: 612
- Population in 1996:
  - Municipality of Beaux-Rivages: 1104
  - Village of Lac-des-Écorces: 989
  - Village of Val-Barrette: 611
- Population in 1991:
  - Municipality of Beaux-Rivages: 1025
  - Village of Lac-des-Écorces: 949
  - Village of Val-Barrette: 551

Mother tongue (2021):

- English as first language: 0.9%
- French as first language: 97.6%
- English and French as first language: 0.9%
- Other as first language: 0.5%

== See also ==
- List of municipalities in Quebec
