= Mont-Laurier =

- City
- Mont-Laurier in 2026

- Coat of arms
- Motto: Laurus elationis praemium
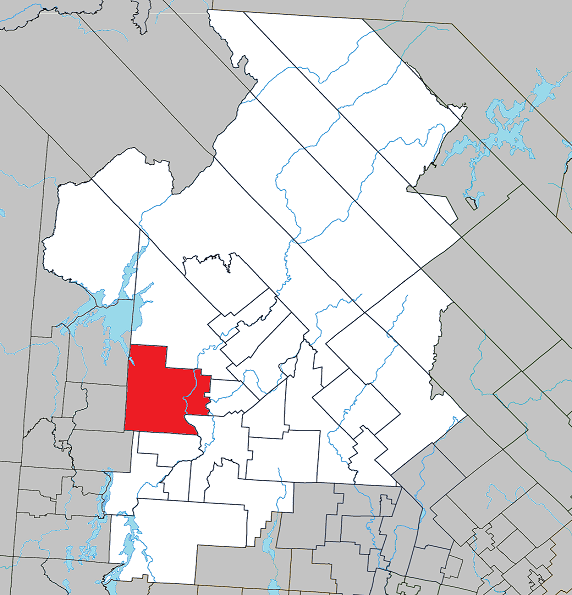
- Location within Antoine-Labelle RCM

- Location in central Quebec
- Coordinates: 46°33′N 75°30′W
- Country: Canada
- Province: Quebec
- Region: Laurentides
- RCM: Antoine-Labelle
- Constituted: January 8, 2003

Government
  - Mayor: Daniel Bourdon
  - Federal riding: Laurentides—Labelle
  - Prov. riding: Labelle

Area
  - City: 633.96 km^{2} (244.77 sq mi)
  - Land: 587.42 km^{2} (226.80 sq mi)
  - Urban: 10.40 km^{2} (4.02 sq mi)
- Elevation: 244 m (801 ft)

Population (2021)
  - City: 14,180
  - Density: 24.1/km^{2} (62/sq mi)
  - Urban: 7,634
  - Urban density: 733.8/km^{2} (1,901/sq mi)
  - Pop. 2016–2021: ▲0.5%
  - Dwellings: 7,223
- Time zone: UTC−5 (EST)
  - Summer (DST): UTC−4 (EDT)
- Postal code(s): J9L
- Area code: 819
- Highways: R-107; R-117 (TCH); R-309
- Website: www.villemontlaurier.qc.ca

Mont-Laurier (French pronunciation: [mɔ̃ loʁje]) is a town and incorporated municipality in western Quebec, Canada, located on the banks of the Lièvre River (Rivière du Lièvre), a tributary of the Ottawa River. Known as the "Capital of the Haute-Laurentides", the motto of the town is Laurus elationis praemium, which translates to "Lift the laurels of reward". The demonym for its inhabitants is Lauriermontois.

According to the 2021 Canadian census, the population of Mont-Laurier is 14,180. It is the seat of Antoine-Labelle Regional County Municipality and the judicial district of Labelle.

== History ==
The territory was originally inhabited by Oueskarinis, a sub tribe of Algonquians. The European settlers came from Sainte-Adèle in 1866, and the place was originally called Rapide-de-l'Orignal (English: Moose Rapids) in 1885, by Solime Alix. The name referred to, according to a legend, a panicked moose that made a huge leap at a waterfall on the Lièvre River. On Octobre 14, 1909, the place was incorporated as the Village Municipality of Mont-Laurier by separating from the Township Municipality of Campbell (founded in 1900). It was named in honour of Canadian Prime Minister Sir Wilfrid Laurier.

Just before the founding of the village municipality, the railway from Montreal through the Laurentides reached Mont-Laurier, with the first train arriving on September 15, 1909. Two months later the station was completed. As the terminus of the railway, it served as transit point for passengers and a center for receiving and shipping goods, handling between 100 and 125 freight cars every week. Freight wagons from Montreal brought coal, oil, or any other merchandise, while returning wagons were full of wood and animals. In 1940, a road from Mont-Laurier to Abitibi was built. This facilitated the growth of the trucking industry. Increased use of the road in the 1960s led to the decline of the railroad.

In 1950, Mont-Laurier changed statutes and became a ville. In 1971, it merged with the Township Municipality of Brunet (that succeeded Campbell Township in 1953).

On November 13, 1981, the P'tit train du Nord made its last passenger trip to Mont-Laurier, followed by the end of freight transport towards the end of the 1980s.

In 2003, Mont-Laurier merged with the neighbouring towns Des Ruisseaux and Saint-Aimé-du-Lac-des-Îles, with the name Mont-Laurier being chosen for the combined municipality. Following a 2004 demerger referendum vote, Saint-Aimé-du-Lac-des-Îles left Mont-Laurier in 2006 to be reconstituted as an independent municipality. The de-amalgamation did not affect Des Ruisseaux, which remains part of Mont-Laurier.

== Geography ==
In addition to Mont-Laurier, the municipality also consists of the following population centres: Lac-Gatineau, Saint-Jean-sur-le-Lac, and Val-Limoges.

Mont-Laurier is located on the banks of the Rivière du Lièvre, a tributary of the Ottawa River, about 200 kilometres (120 mi) from the river delta. Its location in the Laurentian Mountains places it at an altitude of 244 metres above mean sea level. It is surrounded by numerous lakes and mixed forests that support hunting, fishing and leisure, and the mainstay logging industry.

Mont-Laurier is located roughly at the halfway point of the major roadway from Montreal to Abitibi, Route 117, about 250 kilometres (160 mi) northwest of Montreal. Route 309 follows the Lievre and leads to Gatineau, Quebec and Ottawa, Ontario, 216 kilometres (134 mi) to the south.

=== Climate ===
Mont-Laurier has a humid continental climate (Dfb). It is strongly influenced by its inland position, with significant differences between the warm summers and the very cold winters. Precipitation is high year-round, causing significant snow cover in winter.

Climate data for Mont-Laurier
Month	Jan	Feb	Mar	Apr	May	Jun	Jul	Aug	Sep	Oct	Nov	Dec	Year
Record high °C (°F)	12 (54)	12 (54)	19 (66)	30 (86)	34 (93)	34 (93)	35.5 (95.9)	36.7 (98.1)	33.5 (92.3)	28 (82)	18.5 (65.3)	15 (59)	36.7 (98.1)
Mean daily maximum °C (°F)	−7.6 (18.3)	−4.6 (23.7)	1.6 (34.9)	10.3 (50.5)	18.0 (64.4)	22.7 (72.9)	24.8 (76.6)	23.6 (74.5)	18.7 (65.7)	11.0 (51.8)	3.6 (38.5)	−4.3 (24.3)	9.8 (49.6)
Daily mean °C (°F)	−13.3 (8.1)	−10.7 (12.7)	−4.6 (23.7)	4.4 (39.9)	11.4 (52.5)	16.3 (61.3)	18.7 (65.7)	17.4 (63.3)	12.9 (55.2)	6.2 (43.2)	−0.5 (31.1)	−9.2 (15.4)	4.1 (39.4)
Mean daily minimum °C (°F)	−19.0 (−2.2)	−16.9 (1.6)	−10.7 (12.7)	−1.5 (29.3)	4.7 (40.5)	9.9 (49.8)	12.5 (54.5)	11.2 (52.2)	7.0 (44.6)	1.4 (34.5)	−4.5 (23.9)	−14.0 (6.8)	−1.7 (28.9)
Record low °C (°F)	−45.0 (−49.0)	−40.6 (−41.1)	−37.0 (−34.6)	−22.2 (−8.0)	−11.7 (10.9)	−3.0 (26.6)	0.0 (32.0)	−2.0 (28.4)	−7.5 (18.5)	−13.0 (8.6)	−27.8 (−18.0)	−42.0 (−43.6)	−45.0 (−49.0)
Average rainfall mm (inches)	68.6 (2.70)	54.2 (2.13)	62.5 (2.46)	71.2 (2.80)	90.2 (3.55)	93.0 (3.66)	101.1 (3.98)	99.6 (3.92)	93.1 (3.67)	98.4 (3.87)	88.7 (3.49)	76.8 (3.02)	997.2 (39.26)

== Demographics ==
In the 2021 Census of Population conducted by Statistics Canada, Mont-Laurier had a population of 14,180 living in 6,698 of its 7,223 total private dwellings, a change of 0.5% from its 2016 population of 14,116. With a land area of 587.42 km^{2} (226.80 sq mi), it had a population density of 24.1/km^{2} (62.5/sq mi) in 2021.

Canada census – Mont-Laurier community profile

	2021	2016	2011
Population	14,180 (+0.5% from 2016)	14,116 (+2.4% from 2011)	13,779 (+2.8% from 2006)
Land area	587.42 km^{2} (226.80 sq mi)	591.27 km^{2} (228.29 sq mi)	590.76 km^{2} (228.09 sq mi)
Population density	24.1/km^{2} (62/sq mi)	23.9/km^{2} (62/sq mi)	23.3/km^{2} (60/sq mi)
Median age	48.8 (M: 47.6, F: 50.4)	47.7 (M: 46.2, F: 49.5)	45.3 (M: 44.3, F: 46.2)
Private dwellings	7,223 (total) 6,698 (occupied)	6,890 (total)	6,744 (total)
Median household income	$57,600	$47,723	$47,846

References: 2021 2016 2011

Historical census populations – Mont-Laurier

Year	Pop.	±%
1911	752	—
1921	2,211	+194.0%
1931	2,394	+8.3%
1941	2,661	+11.2%
1951	4,701	+76.7%
1956	5,486	+16.7%
1961	5,859	+6.8%

Year	Pop.	±%
1966	6,140	+4.8%
1971	8,240	+34.2%
1976	8,565	+3.9%
1981	8,405	−1.9%
1986	7,937	−5.6%
1991	7,862	−0.9%
1996	8,007	+1.8%

Year	Pop.	±%
2001	7,365	−8.0%
2006	13,405	+82.0%
2011	13,779	+2.8%
2016	14,116	+2.4%
2021	14,180	+0.5%

Population figures not adjusted for boundary changes and mergers.
Source: Statistics Canada

Canada Census Mother Tongue – Mont-Laurier, Quebec
Census	Total	French			English			French & English			Other		
Year	Responses	Count	Trend	Pop %	Count	Trend	Pop %	Count	Trend	Pop %	Count	Trend	Pop %
2021	13,970	13,670	▲0.7%	97.9%	110	▲10.0%	0.8%	65	▲8.3%	0.5%	105	▲16.7%	0.8%
2016	13,820	13,580	▲1.3%	98.3%	100	▲5.3%	0.7%	60	▲33.3%	0.3%	90	▲28.6%	0.7%
2011	13,630	13,410	▲3.7%	98.4%	95	▲216.7%	0.7%	45	▲200.0%	0.3%	70	▼53.3%	0.5%
2006	13,135	12,935	▲84.3%	98.5%	30	0.0%	0.2%	15	▼50.0%	0.1%	150	▲500.0%	1.1%
2001	7,105	7,020	▼8.9%	98.8%	30	▼25.0%	0.4%	30	▲50.0%	0.4%	25	▼44.4%	0.4%
1996	7,810	7,705	n/a	98.7%	40	n/a	0.5%	20	n/a	0.3%	45	n/a	0.6%

== Economy ==
Mont-Laurier is the administrative and commercial centre of the Haute-Lievre area. Many residents are employed by the various governments, the schools and the hospital. Most of the economic activity is generated by tourism, road transport and forestry. There is some agriculture, mostly dairy farming, and dairy products manufacturing.

== Government ==
Michel Adrien, a black immigrant to Canada from Haiti, was elected mayor in 2003 with an 80% majority (in a town where more than 95% of the population are Caucasian, and less than 1% of the population are Black Canadians). With no opponent running against him, Adrien was reelected through acclamation in 2005, 2007 and 2009. In addition to a mayoral leader, the municipality is governed by a city council.

=== Former mayors ===
List of former mayors:

- Édouard Lemieux (1960-1964)
- Michel Adrien (2003–2017)
- Daniel Bourdon (2017–present)

== Notable people ==
- Sylvain Pagé, member of L'Assemblée nationale du Québec
- Yvon Charbonneau, union leader
- Dan Cloutier, National Hockey League goaltender
- Michel Melançon, drummer of "Emerson Drive"
- Jocelyn Lemieux, retired NHL Player
- Bobby Bazini, singer-songwriter

== See also ==
- List of cities in Quebec
- Mont-Laurier Airport
- Parc Linéaire Le P'tit Train du Nord - railtrail to Mont-Laurier
