= Lièvre River =

Lièvre River Hare River
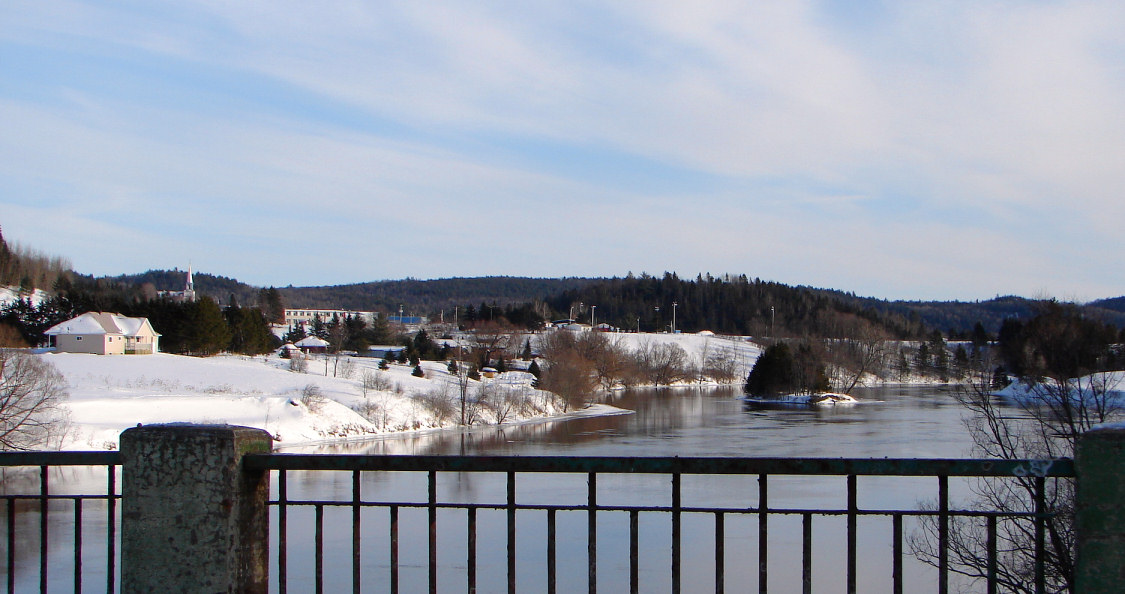
- Lièvre River at Notre-Dame-de-la-Salette
- Native name: Rivière du Lièvre (French)

Location
- Country: Canada
- Province: Quebec
- Region: Laurentides, Outaouais

Physical characteristics
- Source: Laurentian Mountains
- Mouth: Ottawa River
  - location: Masson, Outaouais
  - coordinates: 45°31′25″N 75°25′50″W
- Length: 330 km (210 mi)
- Basin size: 10,400 km^{2} (4,000 sq mi)

Basin features
- Progression: Ottawa River→ St. Lawrence River→ Gulf of St. Lawrence
- River system: Ottawa River drainage basin

The Lièvre River (French: Rivière du Lièvre, pronounced [ʁivjɛʁ dy ljɛvʁ]) is a river in western Quebec which flows south from the Mitchinamécus reservoir and empties into the Ottawa River at Masson-Angers. The river is 330 kilometres (210 mi) long and drains an area of 10,400 square kilometres (4,000 mi^{2}). The river's name is an adaptation of its former French name Riviere aux Lièvres, "River of the Hares".

The 1908 landslide at Notre-Dame-de-la-Salette and the earlier 1903 clay landslide at Leda both occurred on this river.

At one time, the river was used to transport logs downstream to sawmills located near the river's mouth. In 1928, a paper mill was built near the mouth of the river. On December 18, 1998, this mill was bought from Industries James Maclaren Inc. by private investors and became Papier Masson Ltee. In turn, the White Birch Paper Company bought it in January 2006.

There are a number of hydroelectric plants on the river, as well as large and viable deposits of Uranium ore in the district.

The river is the subject of Archibald Lampman's poem "Morning on the Lièvre". The award-winning short film Morning on the Lièvre paired a narration of Lampman's poem with footage of two men canoeing on the river.

== Tributaries ==
- Mitchinamécus River
- Kiamika River

== Communities ==
- Mont-Laurier
- Notre-Dame-de-Pontmain
- Notre-Dame-du-Laus
- Val-des-Bois
- Notre-Dame-de-la-Salette
- Glen Almond (municipality L'Ange-Gardien)
- Buckingham now part of Gatineau
