= Tremblant =

Tremblant most commonly refers to:

- Mont-Tremblant, a city in Quebec, Canada
- Mont Tremblant Resort, a ski resort in Quebec, Canada

Tremblant, Mont-Tremblant, or Mont Tremblant may also refer to:

== Places ==
- Mont-Tremblant National Park, a provincial park in Quebec, Canada
- Lac-Tremblant-Nord, a small village in Quebec, Canada
- Urban agglomeration of Mont-Tremblant, metropolitan regional government and area

== Geographical features ==
- Mont Tremblant, a mountain in the Laurentian Mountains
- Lake Tremblant, a lake in Quebec, Canada

== Sports ==
- Circuit Mont-Tremblant, a road racing course in Mont-Tremblant, Quebec, Canada
- Mont Tremblant (horse), a racehorse

== See also ==
- Mont-Tremblant Airport (disambiguation)
