= Zec Collin =

- Location within Quebec
- Location: Canada, Québec, Matawinie
- Nearest city: Saint-Michel-des-Saints
- Coordinates: 46°45′00″N 74°04′00″W
- Area: 427 square kilometres (165 sq mi)
- Established: 1978
- Governing body: Association chasse et pêche Collin Inc.

The ZEC Collin is a "zone d'exploitation contrôlée" (controlled harvesting zone) (ZEC) located in the unorganized territory of Lac-Matawin, in Matawinie Regional County Municipality, in the administrative region of Lanaudière, in Quebec, in Canada.

This ZEC is administered by "Association chasse et pêche Collin Inc". The area economy is based on forestry and recreational and tourism activities.

== Geography ==
Collin ZEC occupies an area of 427 square kilometres (165 sq mi) inside the unorganized Lac-Matawin territory. Its territory is entirely in the forest.

Collin ZEC is bordered to the west by the Rouge-Matawin Wildlife Reserve, which is located north of the Mont-Tremblant National Park. The zec Boullé is located northwest of Zec Collin. On the south side, the ZEC Collin was separated from the Zec Lavigne by a narrow corridor which runs east to Matawin West River. The southern boundary of the ZEC Collin is located close to the Matawin West River and about six miles northwest of Saint-Michel-des-Saints, in the administrative region of Lanaudière.

The territory of the ZEC has two areas joined by a narrow band. The entrance station of the ZEC is located in the northern part of its territory, near the mouth of the Matawin River which crosses the territory towards the southeast.

== Toponymy ==
The toponym "Collin Zec" has originated from the lake Collin. The lake lies in the southern part of the zone d'exploitation contrôlée (controlled harvesting zone) (Zec). From a local surname, the name of this body of water is mentioned in 1888 on a map of the Township Brassard.

The name "ZEC Collin" was recorded on December 5, 1982, at the Bank of place names in the Commission de toponymie du Québec (Geographical Names Board of Québec).

== Hunting and Fishing ==
Located in one of the good wildlife areas of Quebec, the ZEC Collin is populated by moose, black bear and small hunted animal. Many rivers of the ZEC are full of pike, lake trouts, walleye, bass and brook fountain.

In 2014 and 2015, the Collin ZEC will set up spawning grounds for brook trout in lakes Berceuse, Caché, Clair, Conscrit, Cornemuse, Desève, Froid, "de la Hauteur" and "du Milieu" (the Middle). This project was made possible through a grant from Fisheries and Oceans Canada. This development aims to increase the number of spawning grounds for brook trout in these lakes in order to increase the survival rate of eggs of brook trout and reduce costs associated with planting.

Thanks to a grant from the Fondation de la faune du Québec (Wildlife Foundation of Quebec), the lakes Alfred, Liliane, Riter, Roche, Vasar, Vert and Yvette will also be studied to assess the need for spawning for the brook fountain and the necessary work in spawning beds for increasing natural yields.

== Huardière ==
Since 1973, the Department of Biological Sciences of the UQAM offers field courses to undergraduate students in biology and ecology of the certificate. Since the summer of 1983, the courses are the ecological station Huardière at Saint-Michel-des-Saints. The resort is built on the ZEC Collin on Lake Lusignan and includes a set of work rooms and living quarters. The ZEC is an ideal site of ecological research in the area of sugar maple-yellow birch as the animal side, that plant or aquatic.

== See also ==
=== Related articles ===
- Matawin River
- Saint-Michel-des-Saints
- Lac-Matawin,
- Matawinie Regional County Municipality, in administrative region of Lanaudière
- Rouge-Matawin Wildlife Reserve (Réserve faunique Rouge-Matawin)
- Mont-Tremblant National Park (Parc national du Mont-Tremblant)
- Zone d'exploitation contrôlée (Controlled Harvesting Zone) of Quebec

=== External links ===
- Official website of Zec Collin.
