= Lake Tremblant =

Lake in Laurentides region of Quebec, Canada

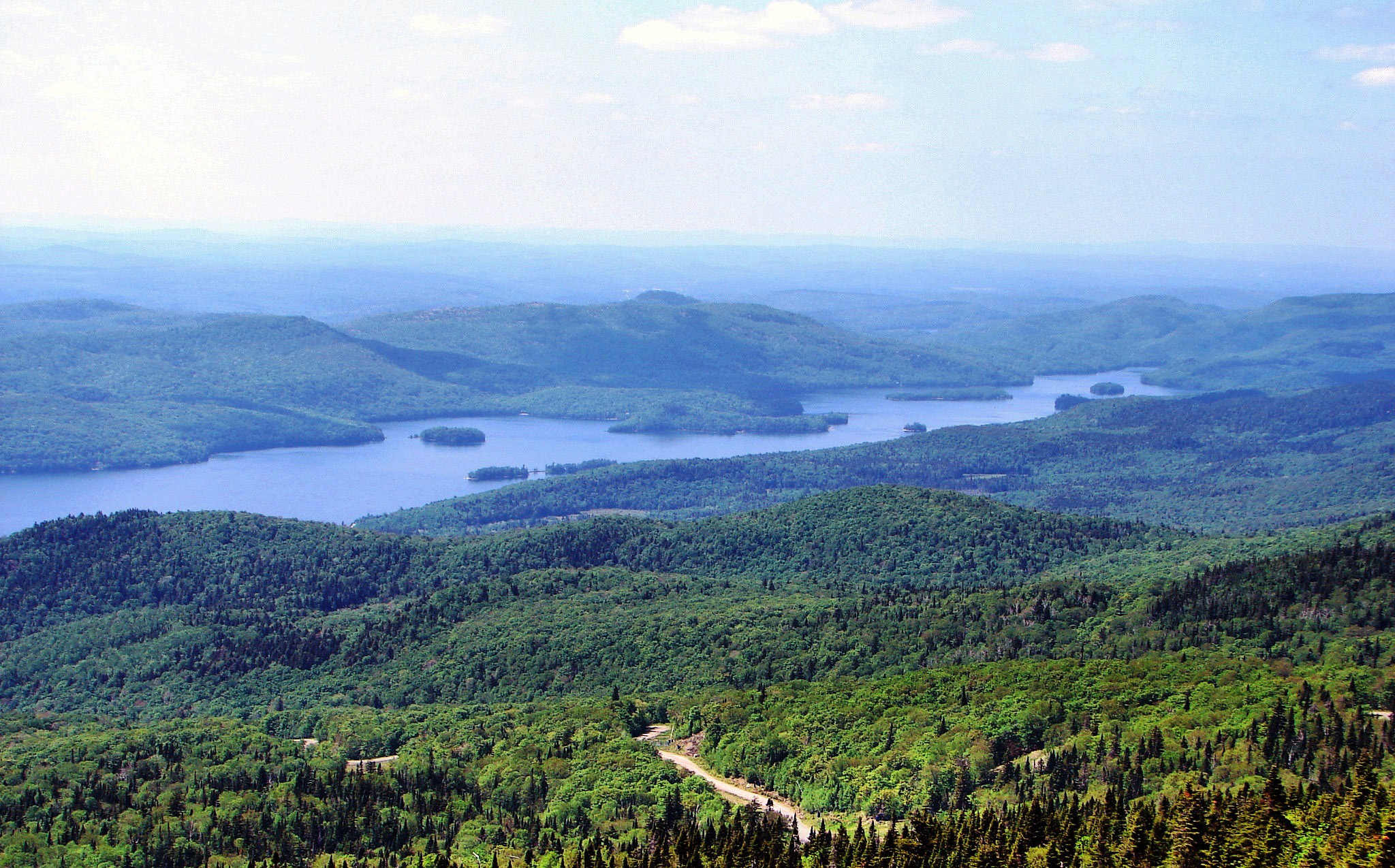

- Location within Quebec
- Location: Mont-Tremblant, Quebec, Canada
- Coordinates: 46°14′48″N 74°38′06″W
- Primary outflows: Petite Cachée River
- Basin countries: Canada
- Max. length: 12 km (7.5 mi)
- Max. width: 1 km (0.62 mi)
- Surface area: 9.45 km^{2} (3.65 sq mi)
- Islands: 7

Lake Tremblant (French: Lac Tremblant) is a lake in the Laurentides region of Quebec, Canada, at the foot of the eponymous Mont Tremblant. South of the lake is the city of Mont-Tremblant, and the municipality of Lac-Tremblant-Nord borders on the western and northern sides of the lake.

Lac Tremblant, wedged between mountainous ridges, is a long and narrow lake with about 7 islands and 5 prominent bays. Surrounded by a dense mixed forest, the lake is situated in the transition zone between the deciduous forests of the Saint Lawrence valley and Canada's boreal forests.

== History ==
The forests around Lake Tremblant were first logged in the late 19th century, and lake was used for driving the logs down the Devils River (Rivière du Diable) and the Rouge River to the Hamilton Brothers Mill in Hawkesbury, Ontario. In the 1890s, the railroad reached Saint-Jovite, and by 1904, it had been extended to Tremblant village on nearby Lac Mercier. From that time on, the local industry began to transform from logging to tourism. The first summer cottages were built on the lake's shore circa 1905, that grew to 33 in 1938. By the 1940s, the log drive on the lake came to an end.

== Natural heritage ==
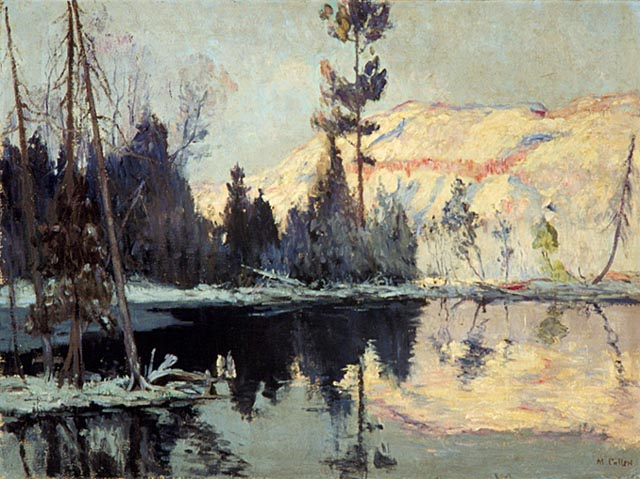
Sunrise, Lac Tremblant, by Maurice Cullen, early 20th century

In 1895, the forests along the north-east side of Lake Tremblant were first protected as a forest reserve (which became Mont-Tremblant National Park in 1981). In 1902, the wooded shores were razed by fire, leading to the formation of the municipality of Lac-Tremblant-Nord in 1915 by its residents who wanted to protect the territory. The new municipality adopted a conservationist charter, and as a result, there is a distinct difference in land use between the northern and southern half of the lake. The southern portion within the City of Mont-Tremblant is developed as a recreation area, whereas the northern part is protected as a private natural heritage area, largely without roads or permanent residents.

The lake and its landscape have been the inspiration for several artists, including French writer Marie Le Franc (for the novel Helier fils des bois) and painters Michel Normandeau and Edwin Holgate.

== Fauna ==
Fish species present include:

- Smallmouth bass
- Largemouth bass
- Musky
- Landlocked salmon
- Lake trout
