= Rouge River (Laurentides) =

River in Laurentides, Quebec (Canada)

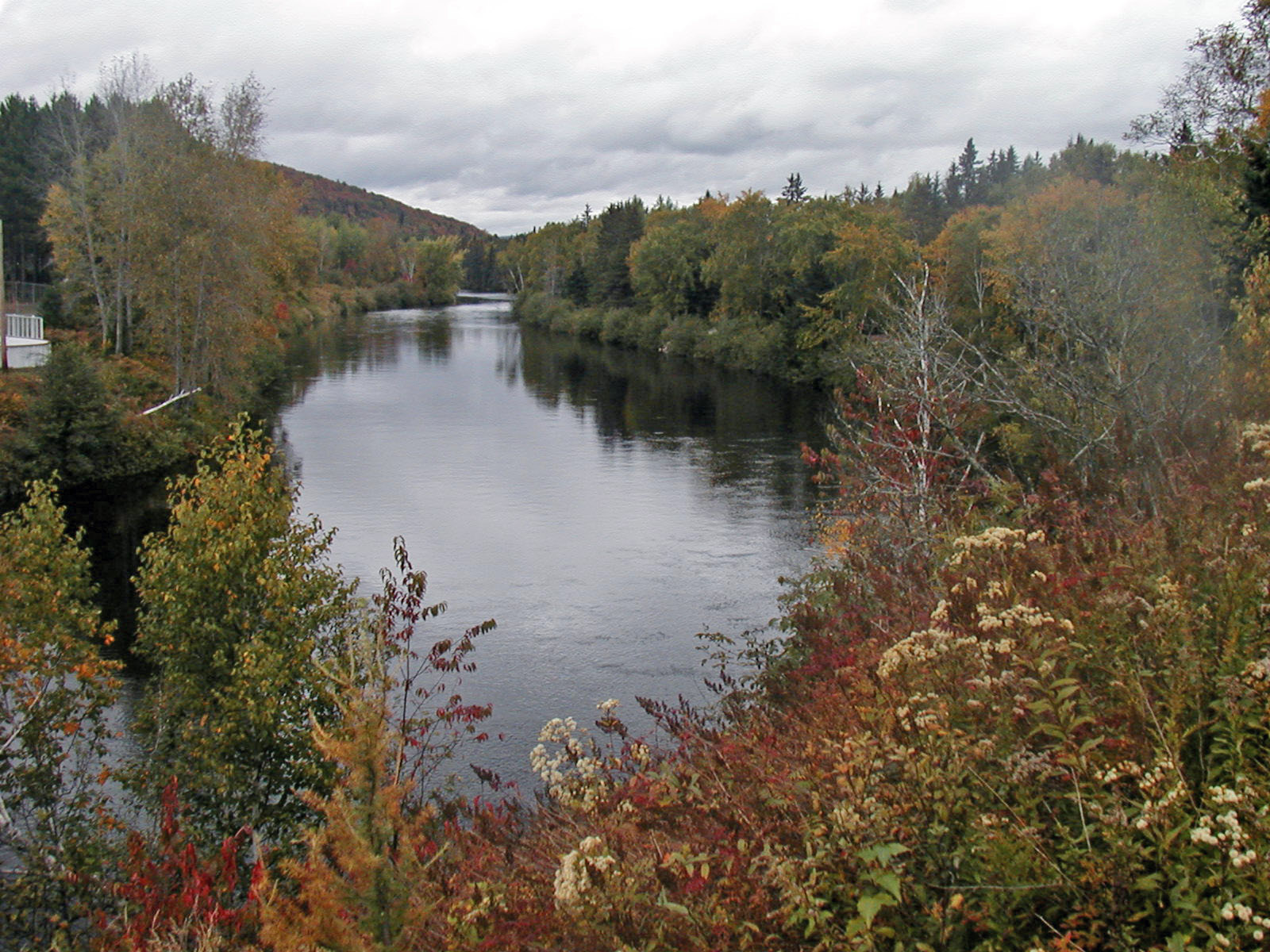
- Rouge River from a bridge at Rivière-Rouge, Quebec; Rouge River at Rivière-Rouge (L'Annonciation)

Location
- Country: Canada
- Province: Quebec
- Region: Laurentides
- MRC: Argenteuil Regional County Municipality
- Municipality: Rivière-Rouge, Brébeuf

Physical characteristics
- Source: Lac de la Fougère
  - location: Lac-Matawin
  - coordinates: 47°04′41″N 74°25′41″W
  - elevation: 549 m (1,801 ft)
- Mouth: Ottawa River
  - location: Grenville-sur-la-Rouge
  - coordinates: 45°38′34″N 74°41′30″W
  - elevation: 41 m (135 ft)
- Length: 161 km (100 mi)

Basin features
- Progression: Ottawa River→ St. Lawrence River→ Gulf of St. Lawrence
- River system: Ottawa River drainage basin
- Tributaries
  - left: (upstream) Beaven River, ruisseau Larose, rivière du Diable, Macaza River et Lenoir River
  - right: (upstream) Maskinongé River, ruisseau Noir, Nominingue River

The Rouge River (French: rivière Rouge, pronounced [ʁivjɛʁ ʁuʒ], lit. 'Red River') is a river flowing in the Laurentides, in the municipality of Grenville-sur-la-Rouge, in the Argenteuil Regional County Municipality, in the administrative region of Laurentides, in western Quebec, Canada.

This 161 kilometres (100 mi) river takes its source at Lac de la Fougère and flows south to empty into the Ottawa River near Pointe-au-Chêne and flows north of Mont Tremblant, of which it is a tributary of the left bank. It is in the Laurentides, about halfway between Ottawa and Montreal. Its name is derived from the reddish tint of its sandbanks.

The river is a popular destination for whitewater rafting. Its last 10 kilometres are renowned for rafting. It is the main body of water in an area comprising hills, valleys, lakes, and waterfalls.

== Communities ==
- Bell Falls
- Rivington
- Harrington
- Arundel
- Huberdeau
- Brébeuf
- Lac-Duhamel
- Lac Lamoureux
- La Conception-Station
- Daoust
- Marchand
- L'Annonciation
- Rivière-Rouge
- Petit-Lac-Lanthier
- Lac-Lanthier-Ouest
- L'Ascension
- Sienna

== Features ==
- Mouth of rivière-rouge: 45°38′34″N 74°41′27″W
- Rapides Maskinongé: 45°49′56″N 74°39′55″W
- The Canyons
- The Turbo
- Surprise
- Devil's Door

== Hydrography ==
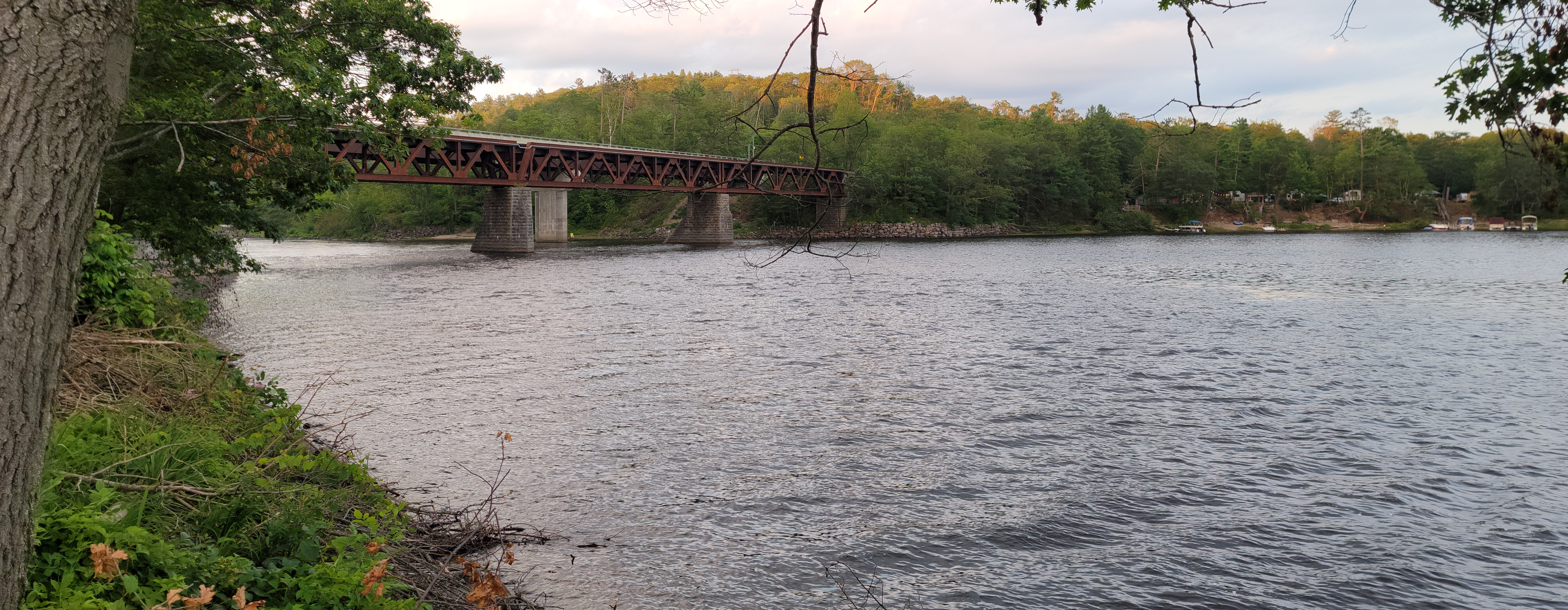
View of the railway bridge at the mouth of the Rouge River in Grenville-sur-la-Rouge in 2022

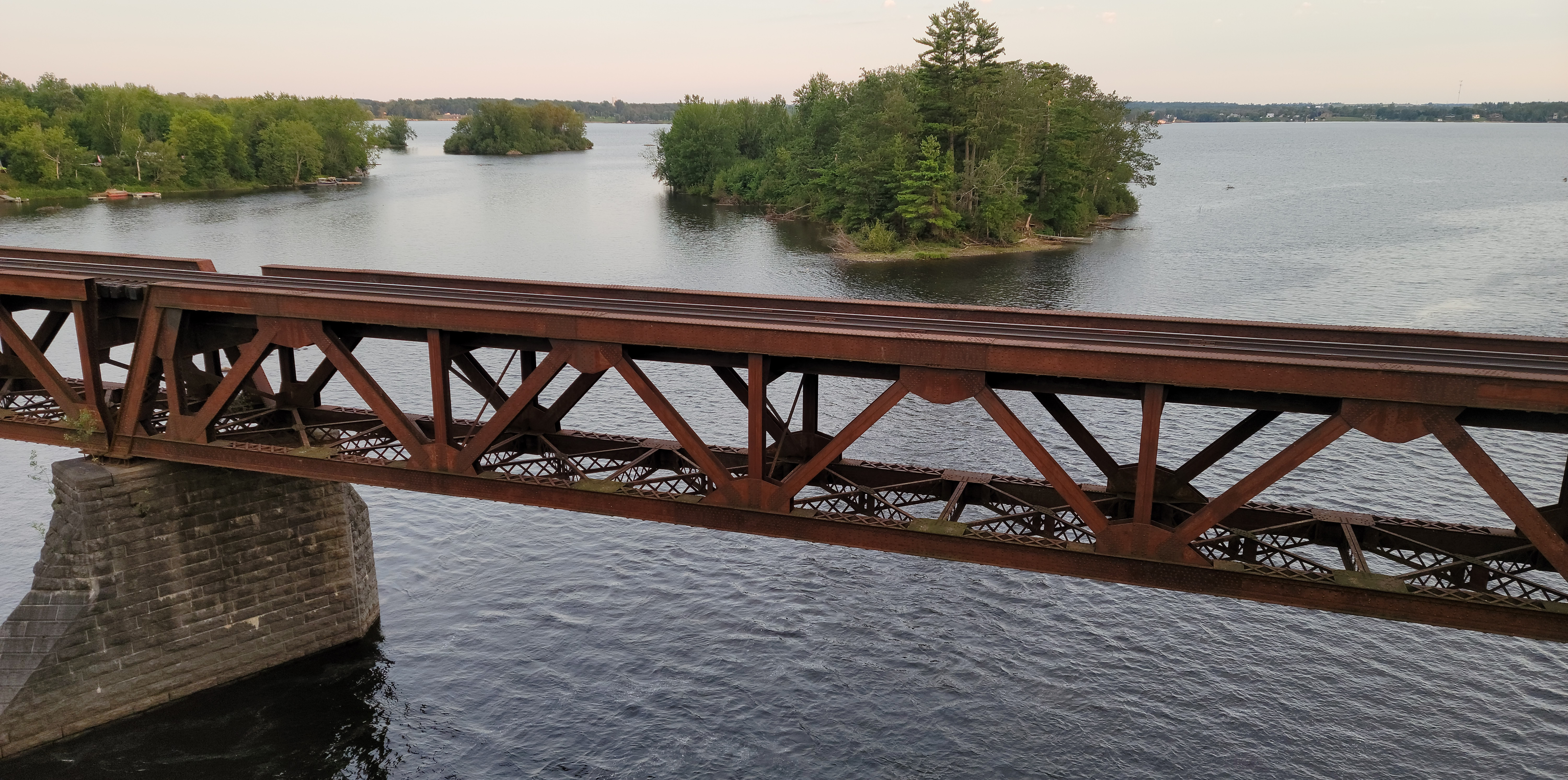
View of the mouth of the Rouge River and the railroad bridge from the Route 148 bridge

The main neighboring watersheds of the Rouge River are:

- north side: Maskinongé River;
- west side: Petite rivière Saumon, Petite-Nation River, Maskinongé River, Nominingue River;
- east side: Kingham River, Calumet River, Beaven River, Diable River, Macaza River, Lenoir River;
- south side: Ottawa River.

The Rouge river has its source at Lac de la Fougère, located at the northern end of the township of Dupont, in the unorganized territory of Lac-Matawin at about 550 metres (1,800 ft) of altitude.

From Fougère Lake, the Rouge River flows south, crossing Red Lake formed by the widening of the river. The river winds along the entire length of the western limit of the Rouge-Matawin Wildlife Reserve that it separates from the Zec de la Maison-de-Pierre. When leaving the wildlife reserve, it has already lost more than 275 metres (902 ft) in altitude.

The landscape also changes from a rocky plateau to a sandy plain and crosses its first village, L'Ascension, then Labelle and La Conception. About twenty kilometers downstream, it meets the Nominingue River and then changes its course in a south-southeast direction. At the end of a 161 kilometres (100 mi) route, the Red River flows on the north shore of the Ottawa River between the village of Calumet and the municipality of Pointe-au-Chêne, in the territory of the Argenteuil Regional County Municipality.

In the last 10 kilometres (6.2 mi) long segment, the river has several falls and rapids, including the First, Second and Third Nigger-Eddy Rapids. Among its main tributaries, the Rouge River receives water from:

- east side: the Lenoir River, Macaza River and the rivière du Diable rivers, passing to Saint-Jovite;
- west side: the Maskinongé River and the Nominingue River.

The Red River watershed covers 5,543 kilometres (3,444.26 mi). The course of the river is generally peaceful (except the last segment of 10 kilometres (6.2 mi)) with many U and S meanders.

== 2019 floods ==
In late April 2019, water flows reached 10 times the normal flow due to heavy flooding in the area. Fearing dam failure, authorities evacuated citizens down the stream of the Bells Fall dam.

== History ==
The region was inhabited by the Iroquois until the end of the 19th century. Under the leadership of the priest François-Xavier-Antoine Labelle, the river served as a path of colonization which saw the birth of most of the communities along its course and its tributaries. The Chute Bell Powerhouse was installed 15 kilometres (9.3 mi) from its mouth in 1915.

== Toponymy ==
The Rouge River valley served as a penetration route for the pioneers responding to calls for colonization in the north of Montreal made by the priest Antoine Labelle. In French Canada, the Catholic dioceses exercised the role of planning for the establishment of parishes and of organizing parishes in the territories of colonization.

A map by Franquelin, dated 1699, indicated the "Red River" as an extension of the "North River". Hypotheses have been made by historians as to the origin of this hydronym. The most likely hypothesis makes the link with the slightly reddish hue of the waters of the river, due to the oxidation of certain types of rocks of the Canadian Shield that cross the river. However, its water is said to be clearer than that of neighboring rivers. Another explanation would come from a red chalk deposit located at Grand lac Nominingue that the Algonquins and Iroquois used to paint themselves.

Flowing at the western edge of the Rouge-Matawin Wildlife Reserve, the term "red" of this river has been transposed to the latter.

The toponym Rivière Rouge was formalized on December 5, 1968, by the Commission de toponymie du Québec.

Among other things, the river gave its name to the Rivière-Rouge Ecological Reserve, the Rouge-Matawin wildlife reserve and the communities of Rivière-Rouge and Grenville-sur-la-Rouge.

== See also ==
- Ottawa River, a watercourse
- Petite rivière Saumon, a stream
- Macaza River, a stream
- Maskinongé River, a watercourse
- Grenville-sur-Rouge, a municipality
- Argenteuil Regional County Municipality (MRC)
- List of rivers of Quebec
