= Zec Boullé =

- Location within Quebec
- Location: Matawinie, Quebec, Canada
- Nearest city: Saint-Michel-des-Saints
- Coordinates: 47°01′00″N 74°19′00″W
- Area: 638.5 square kilometres (246.5 sq mi)
- Established: 1978
- Governing body: Association Chasse et Pêche Boullé inc.

The Zec Boullé is a "zone d'exploitation contrôlée" (controlled harvesting area) in the unorganized territories of Lac-Matawin and Baie-de-la-Bouteille, in Matawinie Regional County Municipality, in the administrative region of Lanaudière, Quebec, Canada.

The main economic activities of the area are forestry and tourist activities. This zec is administered by "Association Chasse et Pêche Boullé inc".

== Geography ==
Zec Boullé is located in a forested area northwest of the Zec Collin in the unorganized territory of Lake Matawin. The territory of the Zec is bordered to the west by the Rouge-Matawin Wildlife Reserve (Réserve faunique Rouge-Matawin). Bodies of water in the Zec are generally frozen from November to April.

The Zec is located north of Saint-Michel-des-Saints, 43rd km of Manawan Road in less than 2 1/2 hours from Montreal. The ZEC has an area of 638 square kilometres (246 sq mi) and has over 150 lakes, most of which are used for sport fishing. The majority of the lakes is accessible by bike, and many accessible by truck. More than 80 lakes contain brook trout and 3 other splake. It also has 44 lakes with pike, 15 lakes with "Doré" fish and 22 lakes golden perch.

In addition to hunting and fishing, ZEC offers various services: accommodations, camping, hiking, mountain bike trails, canoe camping, berry picking, etc. In addition, many lakes, rivers and streams are on the territory. Diane Falls located on the Boiret Creek worth visiting.

== Toponymy ==
The term "Boulle" identifies a zone d'exploitation contrôlée (controlled harvesting zone) (ZEC), township, lake and river that are located on the territory of the ZEC Boullé in the Lanaudière region. The anthroponym Boullé honours Helene Boullé (1598–1654), wife of Samuel de Champlain, the founder of Quebec.

The name Zec Boullé was entered in the directory of place names of the Commission de toponymie du Québec (Geographical Names Board of Quebec) on August 5, 1982.

== See also ==
- Matawin River
- Rivière-du-Milieu (Lanaudière)
- Lake Charland (Matawinie)
- Saint-Michel-des-Saints, municipality
- Zone d'exploitation contrôlée (Controlled Harvesting Zone) of Quebec
