= Rouge-Matawin Wildlife Reserve =

Wildlife Reserve in Quebec, Canada

- Location within Quebec
- Location: Antoine-Labelle and Matawinie, Quebec, Canada
- Nearest city: Mont-Tremblant and Rivière-Rouge 46° 51' 0" N, 74° 31' 0" W
- Coordinates: 46°51′00″N 74°31′00″W
- Established: 1935
- Governing body: Sépaq (Society of outdoor facilities in Quebec)
- Website: www.sepaq.com/rf/rom/fr/
- Quebec (cone) / Canada

The Rouge-Matawin Wildlife Reserve (French: Réserve faunique Rouge-Matawin) is a Quebec Wildlife Reserve located to the north of Mont-Tremblant National Park, in Quebec, Canada.

== Geography ==
This reserve covers unorganized of Lac-de-la-Maison-de-Pierre in the Antoine-Labelle Regional County Municipality. Territory of the reserve straddles under the administrative regions of Lanaudière and Laurentides. In addition to the Mont-Tremblant National Park, the Rouge-Matawin Wildlife Reserve is bordered by ZECs of Maison-de-Pierre, Boulé and Collin.

This reserve is divided between two watersheds: in the west, Rouge River and its tributaries; in northeast, the Matawin River and its tributaries. The reserve is bounded to the west by the Rouge River.

Host post of Rouge-Matawin Wildlife Reserve are:

- Welcome Center Saint-Michel-des-Saints (south-east at the intersection of forest roads 3 and 5);
- Welcome Center Macaza (south-west, the west side of "Lake of Sweets", along the forest road No. 4, slightly north of the intersection of Route 2, which pass through the Mont-Tremblant National Park).

Major lakes of the Rouge-Matawin Wildlife Reserve are:

- North: Rouge, Williard, Lenoir, Cordeau and Laverdière,
- East: Sarent, Matawin, Bess and Le Tars,
- South: Des sucreries (Sweet), Écuyer, Odelin, Legendre, Lournand, Jamet, Claire and "Cinq doigts" (Five Fingers) (including Baie-Claire, Baie-Bleue, Baie-des-Barges and Baie-de-la-Dame)
- West: McIntyre, de la Butte, Froid, Grandive, Swastika and Grasmere,
- Center: Brochet, Raimbault, Hardinge, Mosquic and Daulé

== Toponymy ==
The name of the reserve comes from the rivers Rouge and Matawin that originate therein. The name "Rouge-Matawin Wildlife" was recorded on May 28, 1985 at the Bank of place names in Commission de toponymie du Québec (Geographical Names Board of Québec)

== History ==
The history of the territories of Mont-Tremblant National Park and Rouge-Matawin Wildlife Reserve is closely related. By the 19th century, forestry was the main economic activity in these territories. In the 20th century, tourist activities have grown.

=== Territory Rouge- Wildlife Reserve ===
Since its inception, the limits of Wildlife Rouge-Matawin have been amended several times.

In 1924, the "Ministère des Terres et forêts du Québec" (Department of Lands and Forests of Quebec) adopted new goals to further protect wildlife, regulate rivers and better order in logging concessions. Consequently, a legislative amendment begat the creation of the Forest Reserve Mountain-Tremblant (3108 km^{2}), adjacent to the Park-Tremblant Mountain (60 km^{2}), at that time. In 1925, the status of "Forest Reserve" has been attributed to the park. The new reserve is now under the jurisdiction of the Ministère des Terres et Forêts (Ministry of Lands and Forests), and the Park, in the é au parc. Cette nouvelle réserve relève dorénavant de la juridiction du Ministère des Terres et Forêts, et le Parc, sous la celle du Ministère de la Colonisation, des Mines et des Pêcheries (Ministry of Colonization, Mines and Fisheries).

Adopted in 1981, the Provincial Decree 208-81 modifies the boundaries of the Mont-Tremblant National Park. The northern area will now report to the new Réserve faunique Rouge-Matawin (Rouge-Matawin Wildlife Reserve), which then covers 1655 km^{2}. In 1990, an area of 251 km^{2} is returned to the Mont-Tremblant National Park. Thus, the reserve now covers 1394 km^{2}.

=== Forestry and land development ===
In the 19th century, logging was the main economic activity justifying the development of this area. Yards lumbering settled as logging concessions on public lands, granted by the Government of Quebec. Formerly, the Rouge River like the Rivière du Diable (Devil) and Matawin were the only means of transporting timber (by flotation). Forest roads were non-existent, forest entrepreneurs build their own winter roads. In favor of ice on rivers and winter roads improvised in forest, they could achieve their territories cutting and hauling wood to rivers.

The planning activities by the forest industry were: open roads and ports, build camps and depots, erect dams. Generally, the existing network of forest roads to access the territory of the reserve and park, drift from the first forest roads built by logging companies. Today, the territory of the Reserve and the Park still has vestiges showing various activities of former forest sites.

In 1937, the CIP, which already operated softwoods in the valley of "Rivière du Diable" (Devil river), gives expanded its activities to cut forest in watersheds of the Rouge River and the Macaza. Then, the large forestry companies establish their facilities across the territories, according to logging concessions obtained. In 1926, the EB Eddy (Hull) has acquired the rights to logging in the watershed of the Rouge River (Quebec). While the Consolidated Paper Ltd, acquired the stumpage basin of the Matawin River, at north of Saint-Donat, Lanaudière, Quebec using stumpage obtained in 1932. Thus the main roads of the park was developed initially by logging companies. Between 1948 and 1950 the company Consolidated Bathurst set up a road linking Saint-Donat, Lanaudière, Quebec to Saint-Guillaume-Nord and Saint-Michel-des-Saints via the lake Caribou. Then deposit Cypress arranged by Consolidated Bathurst, with fifty buildings that will be used from 1948 to 1969, will become the largest site of the park.

At the time of the reserve Joliette, hardwood has been exploited in the areas of lakes John, Mathias and Sec (Dry) for a sawmill of Saint-Michel-des-Saints. Note that part of the territory of the reserve Joliette became the Zec Lavigne and the other the Assumption sector of the Mont-Tremblant National Park in 1981.

== Hunting and fishing ==
Around 1958, the right to hunt is abolished in the park. However, some clubs continue their sport fishing activities. At that time, 36 private clubs are operating in the territory of the park that reaches an area of 3185 km^{2}. A dozen of these clubs are on the existing park, and a score on the territory that became the Rouge-Matawin Wildlife Reserve.

In 1968, six clubs and outfitting control of fishing territories, including Fourteen club who bought a camp from Consolidated Paper Ltd at the northwest of Lake Lusignan. Today, the territory of the club is part of the East Zone of the Rouge-Matawin Wildlife Reserve

The Reserve, more than 450 bodies of water are available to sport fishermen. The most common species of fish: trout, walleye, pike, trout and smallmouth bass.

Reserve offers various packages to visitors for fishing and accommodation in cottages, camp or prospector's camp. The services includes boats lakes and rivers. SÉPAQ imposes limits and possession of fish, depending on the species

== See also ==
=== Related Articles ===
- Rouge River
- Matawin River
- West Matawin River
- Matawin Lake
- Lanaudière
- Matawinie Regional County Municipality
- Mont-Tremblant National Park
- Zec of the Maison-de-Pierre
- Zec Boullé
- Zec Collin
- Antoine-Labelle Regional County Municipality
