= List of birds of Mont-Tremblant National Park =

This lists the species of birds in Mont-Tremblant National Park in Quebec, Canada. The bolded species indicate that they are threatened in the area.

== Anatidae ==
- Canada goose, Branta canadensis
- Wood duck, Aix sponsa
- American wigeon, Anas americana
- American black duck, Anas rubripes
- Mallard, Anas platyrhynchos
- Ring-necked duck, Aythya collaris
- Velvet scoter, Melanitta fusca
- Bufflehead, Bucephala albeola
- Common goldeneye, Bucephala clangula
- Hooded merganser, Lophodytes cucullatus
- Common merganser, Mergus merganser

== Phasianidae ==
- Ruffed grouse, Bonasa umbellus
- Spruce grouse, Dendragapus canadensis

== Gaviidae ==
- Common loon, Gavia immer

== Ardeidae ==
- American bittern, Botaurus lentiginosus
- Great blue heron, Ardea herodias

== Cathartidae ==
- Turkey vulture, Cathartes aura

== Accipitridae ==
- Osprey, Pandion haliaetus
- **Bald eagle**, **Haliaeetus leucocephalus**
- Northern harrier, Circus cyaneus
- Red-shouldered hawk, Buteo lineatus
- Broad-winged hawk, Buteo platypterus
- Red-tailed hawk, Buteo jamaicensis
- **Golden eagle**, **Aquila chrysaetos**

== Falconidae ==
- American kestrel, Falco sparverius
- Merlin, Falco columbarius

== Charadriidae ==
- Killdeer, Charadrius vociferus

== Scolopacidae ==
- Solitary sandpiper, Tringa solitaria
- Spotted sandpiper, Actitis macularia
- Wilson's snipe, Gallinago delicata
- American woodcock, Scolopax minor

== Laridae ==
- Ring-billed gull, Larus delawarensis
- Herring gull, Larus argentatus

== Columbidae ==
- Mourning dove, Zenaida macroura

== Strigidae ==
- Great horned owl, Bubo virginianus
- Barred owl, Strix varia
- **Short-eared owl**, **Asio flammeus**
- Saw-whet owl, Aegolius acadicus

== Apodidae ==
- Chimney swift, Chaetura pelagica

== Trochilidae ==
- Ruby-throated hummingbird, Archilochus colubris

== Alcedinidae ==
- Belted kingfisher, Megaceryle alcyon

== Picidae ==
- **Red-headed woodpecker**, **Melanerpes erythrocephalus**
- Yellow-bellied sapsucker, Sphyrapicus varius
- Downy woodpecker, Picoides pubescens
- Hairy woodpecker, Picoides villosus
- Black-backed woodpecker, Picoides arcticus
- Northern flicker, Colaptes auratus
- Pileated woodpecker, Dryocopus pileatus

== Tyrannidae ==
- Olive-sided flycatcher, Contopus cooperi
- Eastern wood-pewee, Contopus virens
- Alder flycatcher, Empidonax alnorum
- Least flycatcher, Empidonax minimus
- Eastern phoebe, Sayornis phoebe
- Eastern kingbird, Tyrannus tyrannus

== Vireonidae ==
- Blue-headed vireo, Vireo solitarius
- Eastern warbling-vireo, Vireo gilvus
- Philadelphia vireo, Vireo philadelphicus
- Red-eyed vireo, Vireo olivaceus

== Corvidae ==
- Canada jay, Perisoreus canadensis
- Blue jay, Cyanocitta cristata
- American crow, Corvus brachyrhynchos
- Common raven, Corvus corax

== Alaudidae ==
- Horned lark, Eremophila alpestris

== Hirundinidae ==
- Tree swallow, Tachycineta bicolor
- Barn swallow, Hirundo rustica

== Paridae ==
- Black-capped chickadee, Poecile atricapillus
- Boreal chickadee, Poecile hudsonicus

== Sittidae ==
- Red-breasted nuthatch, Sitta canadensis
- White-breasted nuthatch, Sitta carolinensis

== Certhiidae ==
- Brown creeper, Certhia americana

== Troglodytidae ==
- Winter wren, Troglodytes hiemalis

== Regulidae ==
- Golden-crowned kinglet, Regulus satrapa
- Ruby-crowned kinglet, Regulus calendula

== Turdidae ==
- Eastern bluebird, Sialia sialis
- Veery, Catharus fuscescens
- **Bicknell's thrush**, **Catharus bicknelli**
- Swainson's thrush, Catharus ustulatus
- Hermit thrush, Catharus guttatus
- American robin, Turdus migratorius

== Mimidae ==
- Grey catbird, Dumetella carolinensis

== Sturnidae ==
- Common starling, Sturnus vulgaris

== Motacillidae ==
- American pipit, Anthus rubescens

== Bombycillidae ==
- Cedar waxwing, Bombycilla cedrorum

== Parulidae ==
- **Golden-winged warbler**, **Vermivora chrysoptera**
- Tennessee warbler, Oreothlypis peregrina
- Nashville warbler, Oreothlypis ruficapilla
- Northern parula, Setophaga americana
- Yellow warbler, Setophaga petechia
- Chestnut-sided warbler, Setophaga pensylvanica
- Magnolia warbler, Setophaga magnolia
- Cape May warbler, Setophaga tigrina
- Black-throated blue warbler, Setophaga caerulescens
- Blackburnian warbler, Setophaga fusca
- Bay-breasted warbler, Setophaga castanea
- Blackpoll warbler, Setophaga striata
- Black-and-white warbler, Mniotilta varia
- American redstart, Setophaga ruticilla
- Ovenbird, Seiurus aurocapillus
- Northern waterthrush, Parkesia noveboracensis
- Mourning warbler, Geothlypis philadelphia
- Common yellowthroat, Geothlypis trichas
- Canada warbler, Cardellina canadensis

== Thraupidae ==
- Scarlet tanager, Piranga olivacea

== Emberizidae ==
- American tree sparrow, Spizelloides arborea
- Chipping sparrow, Spizella passerina
- Fox sparrow, Passerella iliaca
- Song sparrow, Melospiza melodia
- Lincoln's sparrow, Melospiza lincolnii
- Swamp sparrow, Melospiza georgiana
- White-throated sparrow, Zonotrichia albicollis
- White-crowned sparrow, Zonotrichia leucophrys
- Dark-eyed junco, Junco hyemalis
- Snow bunting, Plectrophenax nivalis

== Cardinalidae ==
- Northern cardinal, Cardinalis cardinalis
- Rose-breasted grosbeak, Pheucticus ludovicianus
- Indigo bunting, Passerina cyanea

== Icteridae ==
- Red-winged blackbird, Agelaius phoeniceus
- Eastern meadowlark, Sturnella magna
- Rusty blackbird, Euphagus carolinus
- Common grackle, Quiscalus quiscula
- Brown-headed cowbird, Molothrus ater

== Fringillidae ==
- Pine grosbeak, Pinicola enucleator
- Purple finch, Carpodacus purpureus
- White-winged crossbill, Loxia leucoptera
- Common redpoll, Carduelis flammea
- Pine siskin, Carduelis pinus
- American goldenfinch, Carduelis tristis
- Evening grosbeak, Coccothraustes vespertinus
