= Matawin =

Matawin (sometimes referred "Mantawa" or "Mattawin") may refer to:

== Canada ==
Ontario

- Matawin River (Ontario), in Thunder Bay District

Quebec

+ Homonyms respect to names Matawin	Name	Municipality	MRC	Reg. adm.	Coord.	sheet
Matawin Culvert	Ascension (City)	Antoine-Labelle	Les Laurentides Regional County Municipality	46° 35’ 22"; 74° 47' 27"	Select 312835 31J/10-0101
Rouge-Matawin Wildlife Reserve	Lac-de-la-Maison-de-Pierre, Quebec (Unorganized Territory)	Antoine-Labelle	Laurentides	46° 51’ 00"; 74° 31' 00"	142 111 Select 31J/15-0102
Matawin Dam	Baie-de-la-Bouteille, Quebec (Unorganized Territory)	Matawinie	Lanaudière	46° 51’ 43"; 73° 39' 29"	39708 Select 31I/13-0102
Matawin, West Branch (River) (Replaced by : Matawin West River)	Lac-Legendre, Quebec (Unorganized Territory)	Matawinie	Lanaudière	46 38’ 23”; 74° 19' 42"	39713 Select 31J/09-0201
Matawin Digue	Baie-de-la-Bouteille, Quebec (Unorganized Territory)	Matawinie	Lanaudière	46° 51’ 51"; 73° 39' 37"	372390 Select 31I/13-0102
Matawin, Lake	Lac-Matawin, Quebec (Unorganized Territory)	Matawinie	Lanaudière	46° 49’ 22"; 74° 17’ 42"	39710 Select 31J/16-0101
Matawin Reservoir (Replaced by: Taureau Reservoir)	Saint-Michel-des-Saints (City)	Matawinie	Lanaudière	46° 45’ 59"; 73° 50’ 00"	39711 Select 31I/13-0101
Matawin Street	Saint-Michel-des-Saints (City)	Matawinie	Lanaudière	46° 41’ 00"; 73° 55' 00"	Select 333491 31I/12-0201
Lac-Matawin, Quebec	Lac-Matawin, Quebec (Unorganized Territory)	Matawinie	Lanaudière	46° 49’ 00"; 74° 18' 00”	Select 149702 31J/16-0101
Matawin East (Resort)	Saint-Michel-des-Saints (City)	Matawinie	Lanaudière	46° 39’ 35”; 73° 58’ 10”	333 556 Select 31I/12-0201
Matawin East Road	Saint-Michel-des-Saints (City)	Matawinie	Lanaudière	46° 41’ 00"; 73° 55' 00"	Select 102526 31I/12-0201
Matawin West Road	Saint-Michel-des-Saints (City)	Matawinie	Lanaudière	46° 41’ 00"; 73° 55' 00"	Select 333257 31I/12-0201
Matawin West Road	Saint-Guillaume-Nord, Quebec (Unorganized Territory)	Matawinie	Lanaudière	46° 36’ 00"; 74° 06' 00"	Select 31J/09-0102 77601
Matawin West River	Lac-Legendre, Quebec (Unorganized Territory)	Matawinie	Lanaudière	46° 38’ 23"; 74° 19’ 42”	39715 Select 31J/09-0201
Matawin (Township)	Lac-Normand, Quebec (Unorganized Territory)	Mekinac Regional County Municipality	Mauricie	46° 57’ 00”; 73° 05’ 00”	39780 Select 31I/14-0102
Matawin Kiosk	Trois-Rives (City)	Mekinac Regional County Municipality	Mauricie	46° 54’ 22”; 72° 55' 48"	Select 325881 31I/15-0201
Island Matawin Batture the	Trois-Rives (City)	Mekinac Regional County Municipality	Mauricie	46° 55’ 02”; 72° 55' 50"	Select 387157 31I/15-0201
Matawin River (Post Office)	Trois-Rives (City)	Mekinac Regional County Municipality	Mauricie	46° 53’ 50”; 72° 55' 39"	Select 179753 31I/15-0201
Rivière-Matawin, Quebec (Hamlet)	Trois-Rives (City)	Mekinac Regional County Municipality	Mauricie	46° 53’ 50”; 72° 55' 39»	53616 Select 31I/15-0201
Matawin Island	Shawinigan (City) (Wapizagonke Lake)	Shawinigan	Mauricie	46° 54’ 56”; 72° 56' 00”	39709 Select 31I/15-0201
Matawin River (Quebec)	Shawinigan (City) (Wapizagonke Lake)	Shawinigan	Mauricie	46° 54’ 11”; 72° 56’ 00”	39712 Select 31I/15-0201
