= Lac-Tremblant-Nord =

- Municipality
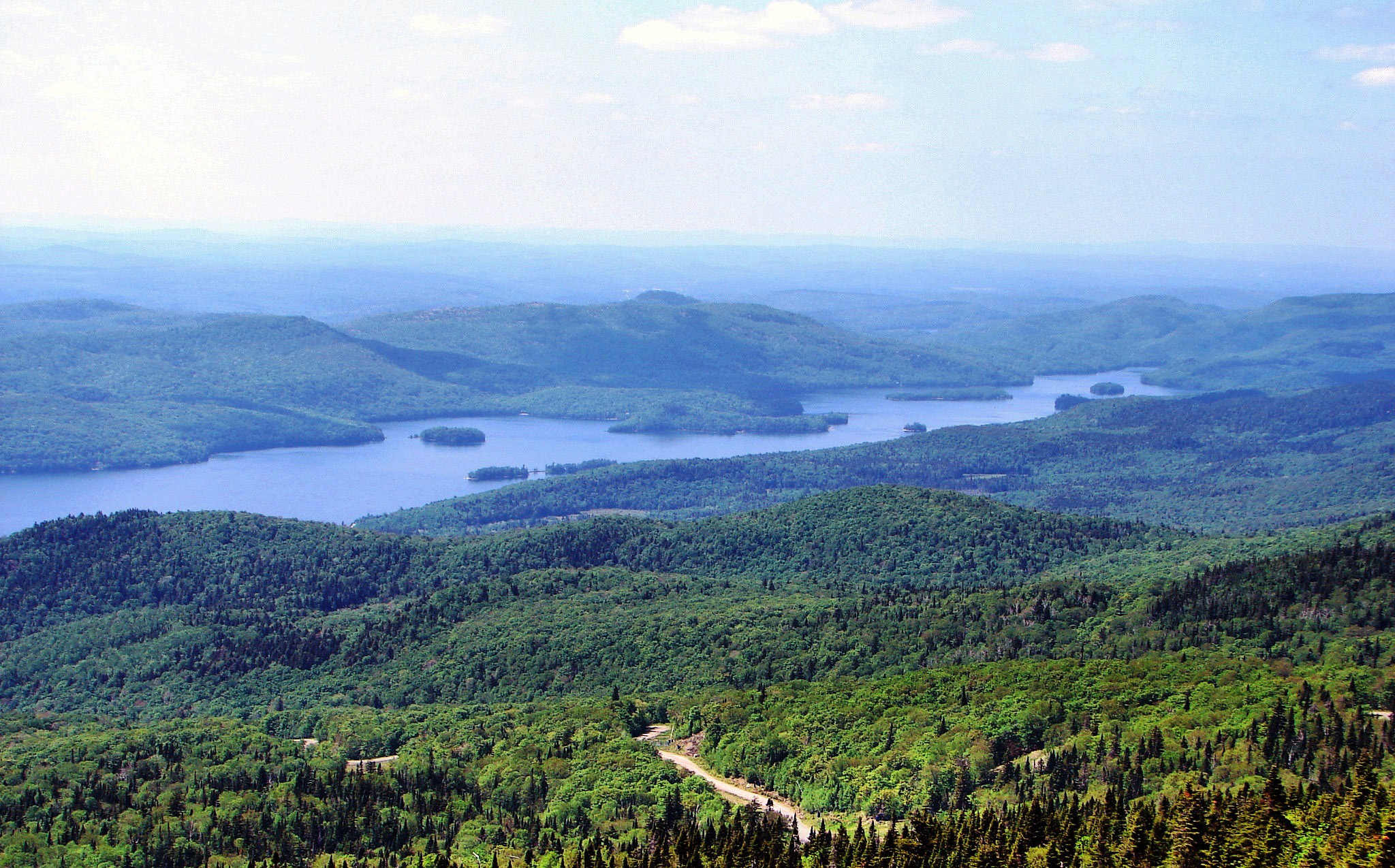
- Northern portion of Lake Tremblant

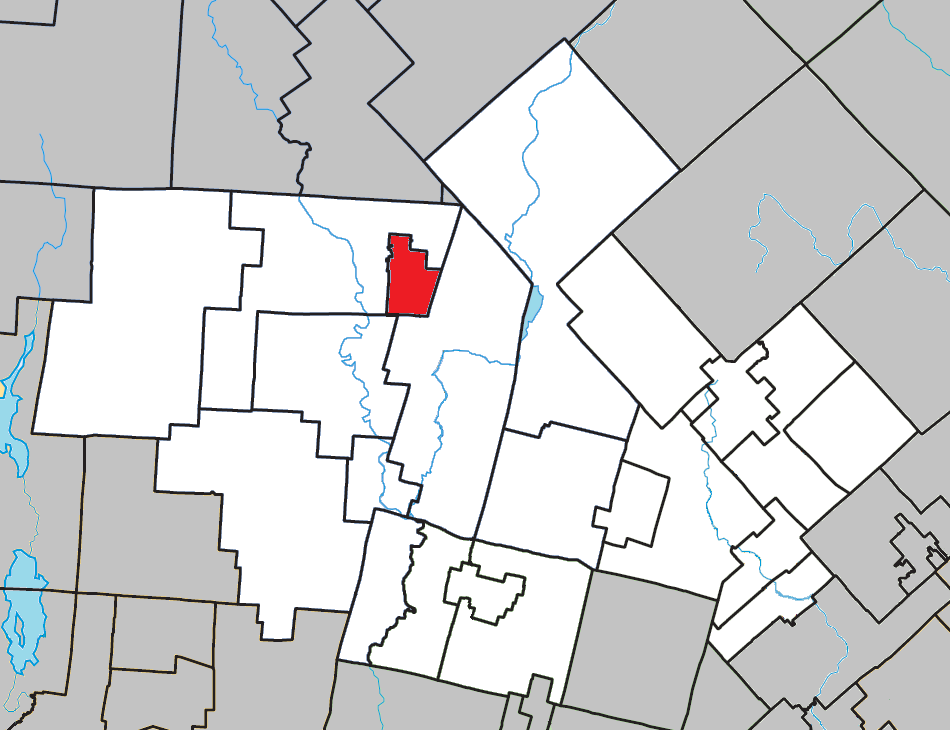
- Location within Les Laurentides RCM

- Location in central Quebec
- Coordinates: 46°14′N 74°38′W
- Country: Canada
- Province: Quebec
- Region: Laurentides
- RCM: Les Laurentides
- Formed: 1915
- Amalgamated: November 22, 2000
- Constituted: January 1, 2006

Government
  - Mayor: Kim Meyer
  - Fed. riding: Laurentides—Labelle
  - Prov. riding: Labelle

Area
  - Total: 27.78 km^{2} (10.73 sq mi)
  - Land: 20.62 km^{2} (7.96 sq mi)
- Elevation: 227 m (745 ft)

Population (2021)
  - Total: 60
  - Density: 2.9/km^{2} (7.5/sq mi)
  - Change 2016-21: ▲42.9%
  - Dwellings: 70
- Time zone: UTC−5 (EST)
  - Summer (DST): UTC−4 (EDT)
- Postal code(s): J8E 1K4
- Area code: 819
- Highways: No major routes
- Website: lac-tremblant-nord.qc.ca

Lac-Tremblant-Nord (French pronunciation: [lak tʁɑ̃blɑ̃ nɔʁ]) is a small village and municipality in the Laurentides region of Quebec, Canada, part of the Les Laurentides Regional County Municipality. Its territory surrounds the northern portion of Lake Tremblant, includes Bibite Lake, and extends to Gervais Lake. The village is located on the south shore of the Lake Tremblant, a few kilometres west of the Mont Tremblant Resort.

Permanent inhabitants of Lac-Tremblant-Nord are few, but its population increases greatly during summer and winter holidays.

== History ==
The municipality was formed in 1915 out of the territory of Joly Township (now Labelle) by its residents who were determined to join in order to protect the territory.

Lac-Tremblant-Nord was among the 4 municipalities that were regrouped to form the new Town of Mont-Tremblant on November 22, 2000. But it was reinstated as a municipality on January 1, 2006.

== Demographics ==
=== Population ===
Historical census populations – Lac-Tremblant-Nord

Year	Pop.	±%
1921	6	—
1931	3	−50.0%
1941	0	−100.0%
1951	0	0.00%
1956	1	—
1961	2	+100.0%
1966	1	−50.0%
1971	0	−100.0%
1976	2	—

Year	Pop.	±%
1981	7	+250.0%
1986	5	−28.6%
1991	0	−100.0%
1996	4	—
2001	35	+775.0%
2006	25	−28.6%
2011	47	+88.0%
2016	42	−10.6%
2021	60	+42.9%

Source: Statistics Canada

Private dwellings occupied by usual residents (2021): 31 (total dwellings: 70)

Mother tongue (2021):

- English as first language: 14.3%
- French as first language: 85.7%
- English and French as first languages: 0%
- Other as first language: 0%

== See also ==
- List of anglophone communities in Quebec
