= Mont-Tremblant Airport (disambiguation) =

Mont-Tremblant International Airport is a single runway airport located in the township of La Macaza, Canada.

Mont Tremblant Airport may also refer to:

- Mont-Tremblant/Saint-Jovite Airport
- Mont-Tremblant/Lac Duhamel Water Aerodrome
- Mont-Tremblant/Lac Ouimet Water Aerodrome
- Mont-Tremblant/Heliport P3 and Mont-Tremblant/Saint-Jovite Héli-Tremblant Heliport, two heliports in Canada
