= Mont Tremblant =

Mountain of the Laurentian Mountains in Canada

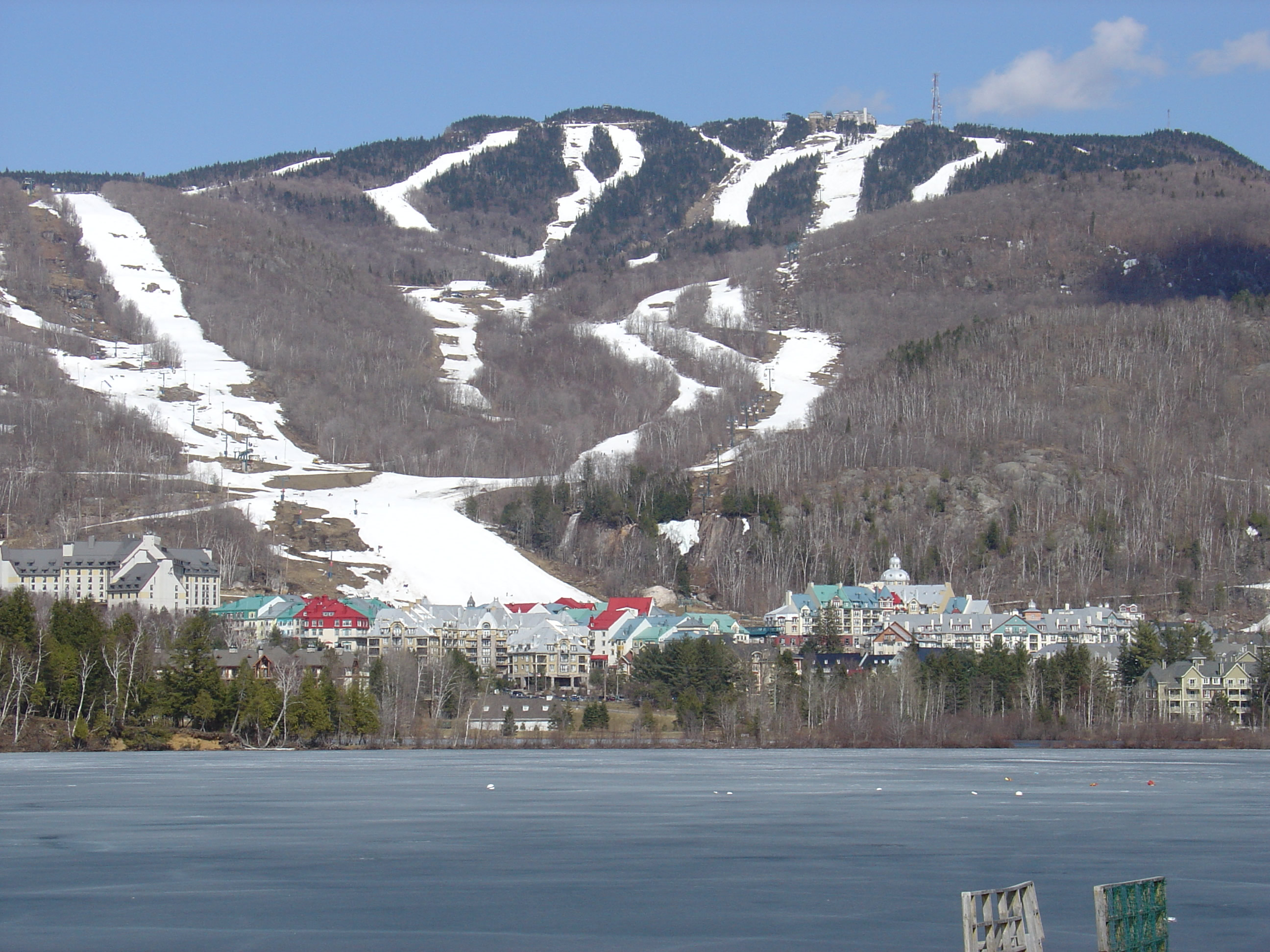
- Mont Tremblant and the ski slopes of the Mont Tremblant Resort

Highest point
- Elevation: 932 m (3,058 ft)
- Prominence: 551 m (1,808 ft)
- Coordinates: 46°14′56″N 74°33′34″W

Geography
- Location within Quebec
- Country: Canada
- Province: Quebec
- City: Mont-Tremblant
- Parent range: Laurentian Mountains

Mont Tremblant (French pronunciation: [mɔ̃ tʁɑ̃blɑ̃]) is a mountain of the Laurentian Mountains, reaching an altitude of 932 metres. It is located in the province of Quebec, Canada, in Mont-Tremblant National Park, about 15 km northeast of the town of Mont-Tremblant and east of Lake Tremblant in the Laurentides region north of Montreal. It is one of the tallest peaks of the Laurentian range. It hosts the Mont Tremblant Resort.

The Algonquin people called the mountain Manitonga Soutana ("Mountain of Spirits"), and described the mountain as emitting rumblings and swaying under their feet. This gave rise to the French name montagne Tremblante or mont Tremblant, literally "trembling mountain."

The first resort was founded on the mountain slopes in 1939.
