= Mont-Tremblant National Park =

Provincial park in Quebec, Canada

- (in French) Parc national du Mont-Tremblant
- IUCN category II (national park)
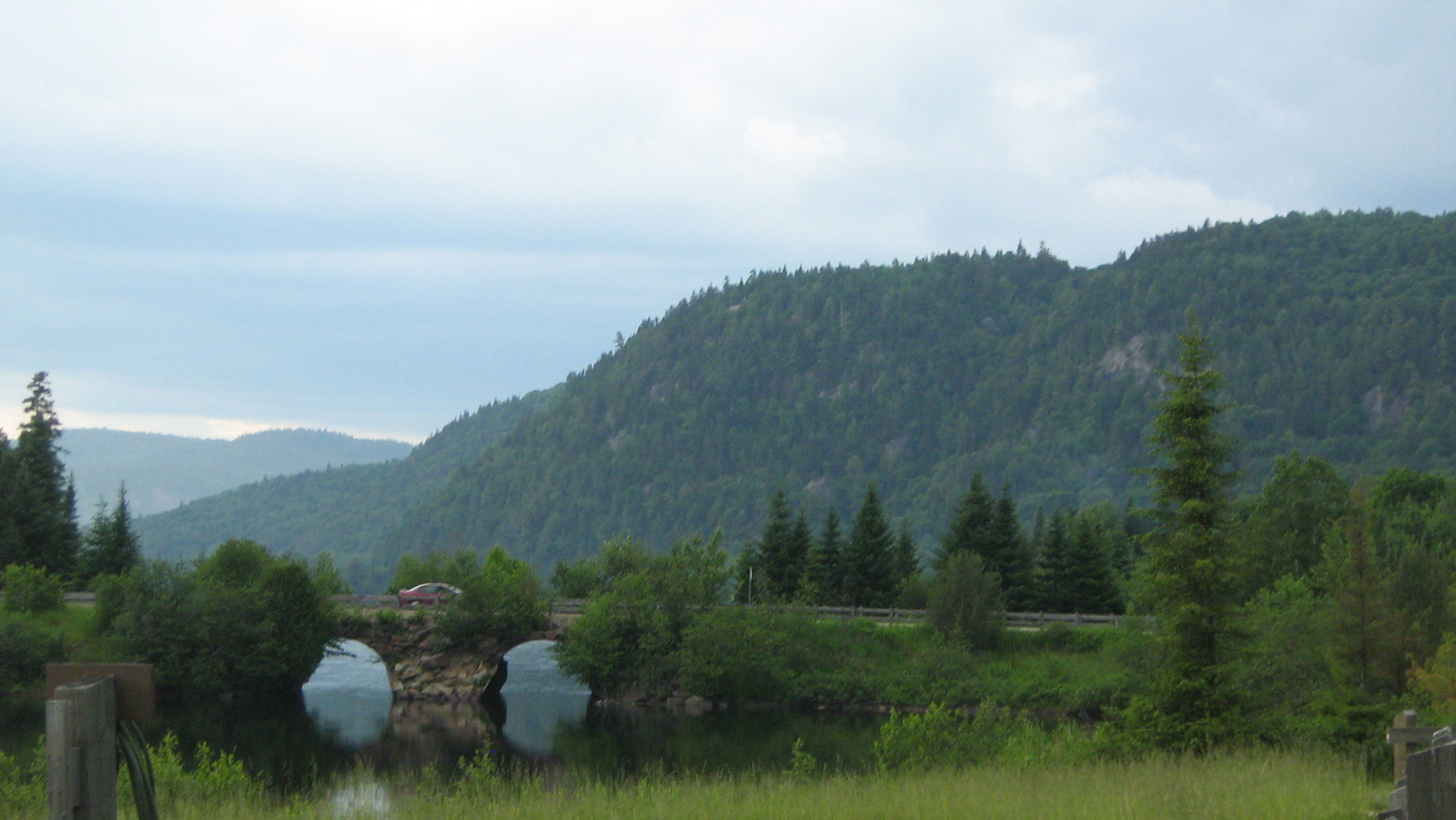
- Interactive map of Mont-Tremblant National Park
- Location: Les Laurentides, Matawinie and Antoine-Labelle RCMs, Quebec, Canada
- Nearest city: Mont-Tremblant
- Coordinates: 46°26′00″N 74°21′00″W
- Area: 1,510.10 km^{2} (583.05 sq mi)
- Established: March 1, 1981
- Governing body: SEPAQ

Mont-Tremblant National Park (French: Parc national du Mont-Tremblant, pronounced [paʁk nɑsjɔnal dy mɔ̃ tʁɑ̃blɑ̃]) is a provincial park in Canada located north of the town of Mont-Tremblant, and the village of Saint-Donat and Saint-Côme, in the administrative regions of Laurentides and Lanaudière, in Quebec, in Canada.

It is Quebec's oldest provincial park and its fourth largest after Kuururjuaq National Park. It takes its name from Mont Tremblant. Several summer and winter activities include cross-country skiing, snowshoeing, short and long hiking hut, canoe lake and river kayaking, mountain biking, backcountry camping and swimming in lakes, such as Lake Lauzon clear water. The park is managed by the Quebec government and its Société des établissements de plein air du Québec (SÉPAQ). In 2023, it was designated a dark-sky preserve park.

== Geography ==
=== Location ===
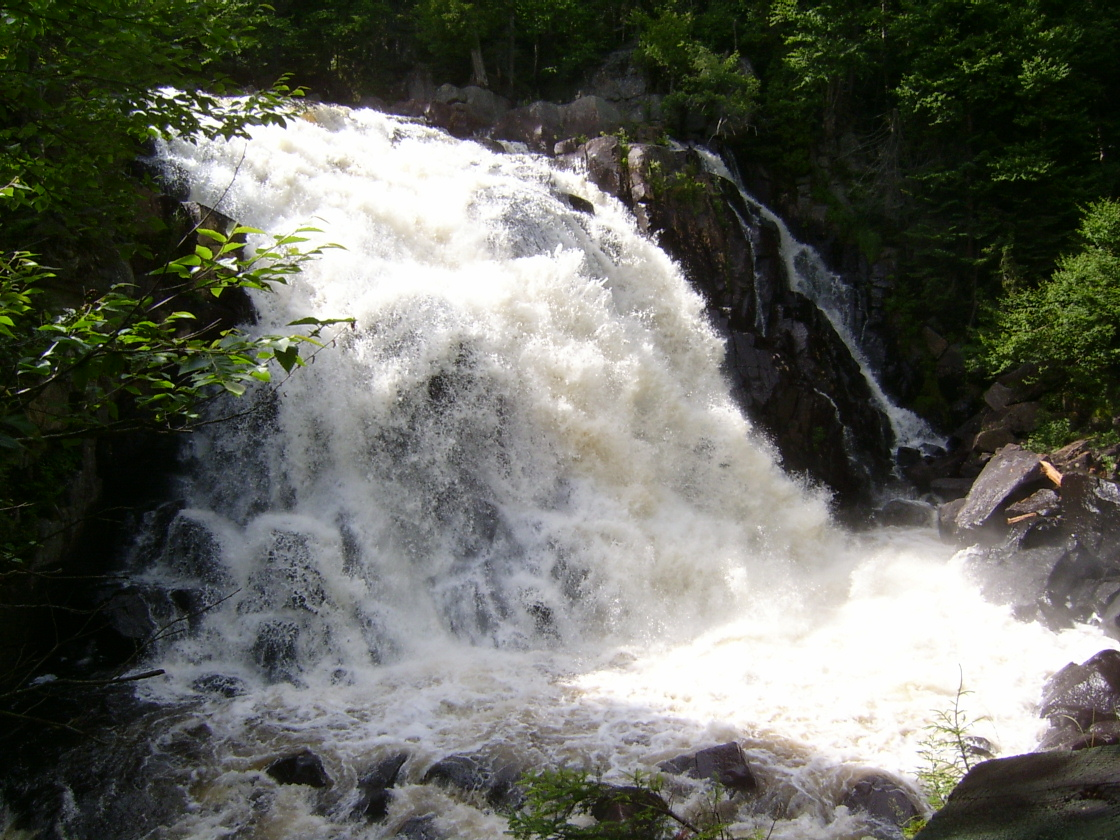
Chute du Diable

This park covers 1,510.1 square kilometres (583.1 sq mi) and is located in the northeast of Mont-Tremblant and extends east to the north of Saint-Côme. Its territory is located in the regional county municipality (MRC) of Les Laurentides, Antoine-Labelle and Matawinie. The park includes eight municipalities and three unorganized territories. It is bounded on the north by the Rouge-Matawin Wildlife Reserve (réserve faunique Rouge-Matawin) and on the east by the Zec Lavigne.

The park is divided into three main areas, namely the valleys of the Diable River, the Pimbina Creek, and the Assomption River. The Diable sector is accessible by highway 15 and route 117 from Montreal; or by route 323 from Ottawa, Ontario. The Pimbina sector is accessible via route 125 from Saint-Donat. The Assomption sector is accessible through Saint-Côme. It is also possible to access to the park by La Macaza, by Labelle and by Saint-Michel-des-Saints.

The park lies within the eastern forest-boreal transition ecoregion.

=== Climate ===
The climate of Mont-Tremblant park is characterized by moderately warm summers and cold winters. Precipitation is relatively abundant all year.

=== Geology and soil science ===
The entire park is located in Grenville Province, the most recent of the Canadian Shield geological provinces. The rock is composed of gneiss and granulites. The passage of the Ice Age strongly influenced its territory rounded hilltops and valleys surcreusant. Given that the park is located in the heart of the Laurentian Mountains, its soils have less humus and experience leaching, which contributes to soil infertility.

The glaciers also left a layer of till with variable size. There are sand deposits along the rivers and lakes. Organic deposits are rare and only found north of Lake Cypress and along some lakes.

=== Hydrography ===
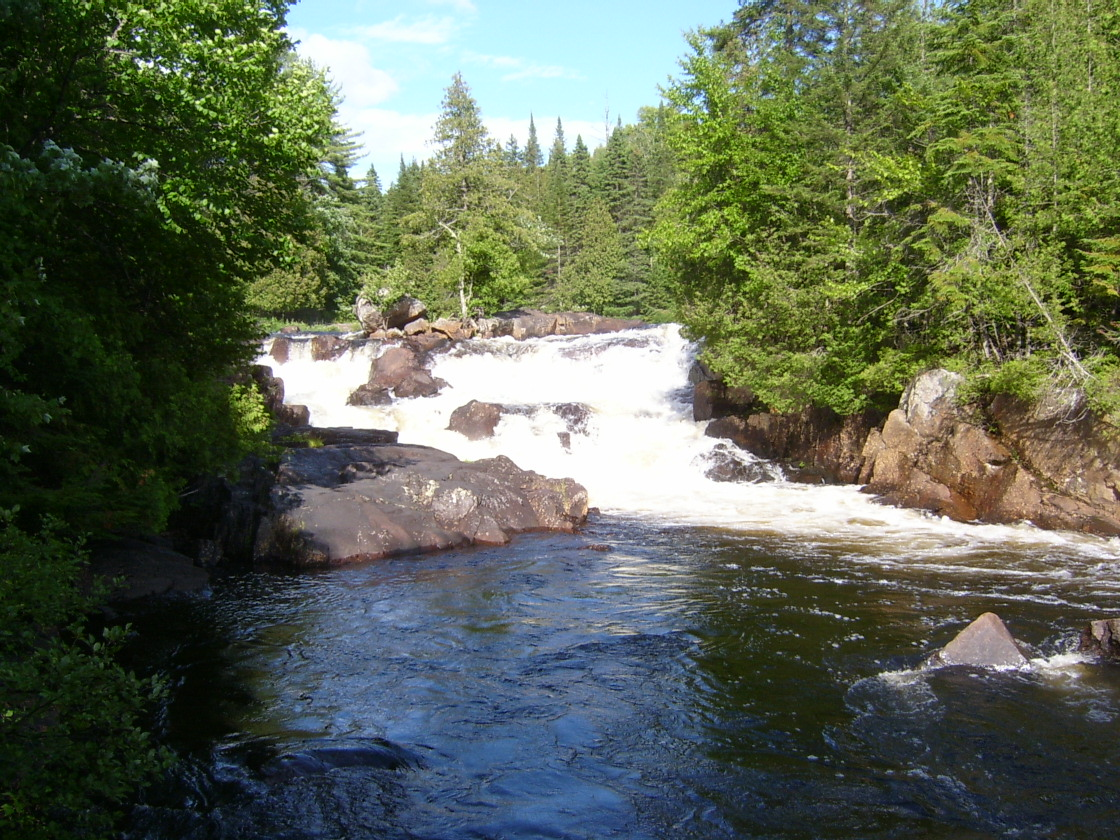
Rivière du Diable and chutes Croches in Mont-Tremblant National Parc

The park is divided in three sub-watersheds, namely the Rouge (through the Diable River) of The Assumption and the Matawin. Streams and forms lakes are greatly influenced by the shortcomings of the Canadian Shield. There are over 400 lakes in the park, including the largest, Lake Cypress, is 9 square kilometres (3.5 sq mi). Most lakes are located in the northern part of the park, the southern portion having a rugged landscape. The position of the park at the head of several watersheds ensures good water quality in streams.

== History ==
The Algonquin called the mountain "Manitonga Soutana" (Mountain of Spirits or Mountain of the Devil). They claimed that the mountain emitted rumblings and swayed under their feet. Logging began in the region in the 1850s. On January 12, 1895, Mont-Tremblant Park was created following the project to set up a sanatorium, which never saw the light of day. Unlike the "preservationist" vision that prevailed in United States and Canada, and that protected the park from exploitation, the province preferred a "conservationist" vision that promoted a reasonable use of the natural resources. That is why logging remained in the park until 1981. Having an original area of 60 square kilometres (23 sq mi), the park was enlarged to 1,510 square kilometres (580 sq mi) in 1925.

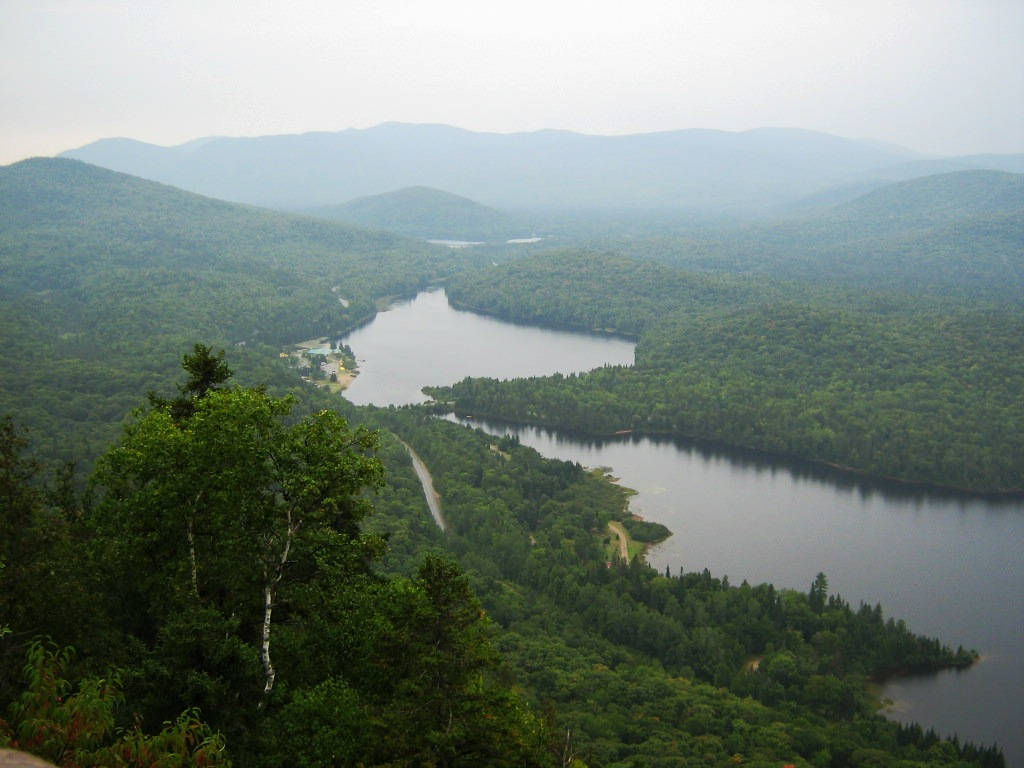
Lac Monroe in the La Diable sector

In 1938, an American named Joe Ryan established a ski resort on Mont-Tremblant mountain and changed provincial law to include the use of public park and place of recreation. A research station opened at Lake Monroe in 1948 and an initial public camping born at Lake Chat 1958, which marked the kickoff for the creation of several recreational facilities in the valleys of the Diable River and northern Saint-Donat. In 1961, the park changed its name to "Parc du Mont-Tremblant".

In 1977, the province changed the philosophy of conservation and adopted the "Law on Parks". This new law precluded commercial and industrial exploitation of natural resources in the parks. The old parks were given priority and the park was granted the status of "recreation park" in 1981, with the exception of an area of 242 square kilometres (93 sq mi) which was included in park in 1990. The northern half of the park became in turn the Rouge-Matawin Wildlife Reserve (réserve faunique Rouge-Matawin). The government revived further consultations in 1998, which produced minor boundary changes and the change in status for "conservation park" in 2000. It became the "Mont-Tremblant National Park" after abandoning the status of recreation park by the province in 2001.

== Natural Heritage ==
=== Wildlife ===
There are 40 species of mammals in the park. The more easily observable are the moose, the deer, the eastern wolf, the red fox, the black bear, the hare, the red squirrel, the Canadian beaver, the muskrat, the river otter and the mink. Eleven of these species are likely to be designated threatened or vulnerable. The eastern wolf is a species of wolf frequenting the park and the emblem of the park. According to estimates, the park might have four or five packs of eastern wolves, and a total eastern wolf population of about 35. The park wolves mainly hunt beaver, moose and deer, which constitute the major part of their diet.

The diversity of birds is much larger with 194 species, including 25 species of warblers. Also present are ruffed grouse, new world sparrows, thrushes, nuthatches, woodpeckers and jays. Birds of prey includes great horned owl, barred owl, hawk species including broad-winged and sharp-shinned, bald eagle, and osprey. Of these species, only the bald eagle is considered vulnerable.The park is used as a staging area for the Canada goose.

The park also includes seven species of reptiles and fourteen species of amphibians, mostly associated with the aquatic environment. It contains, among others, bullfrog, green frog, newt, water snake, wood turtle and painted turtle. The wood turtle is listed as vulnerable in Quebec; and water snakes and pickerel frog are likely to be designated threatened or vulnerable.

Finally, there are 29 species of fish in the park, the main species being the brook trout, which prefer oxygenated headwater lakes, and pike, which prefer warmer waters.

=== Flora ===
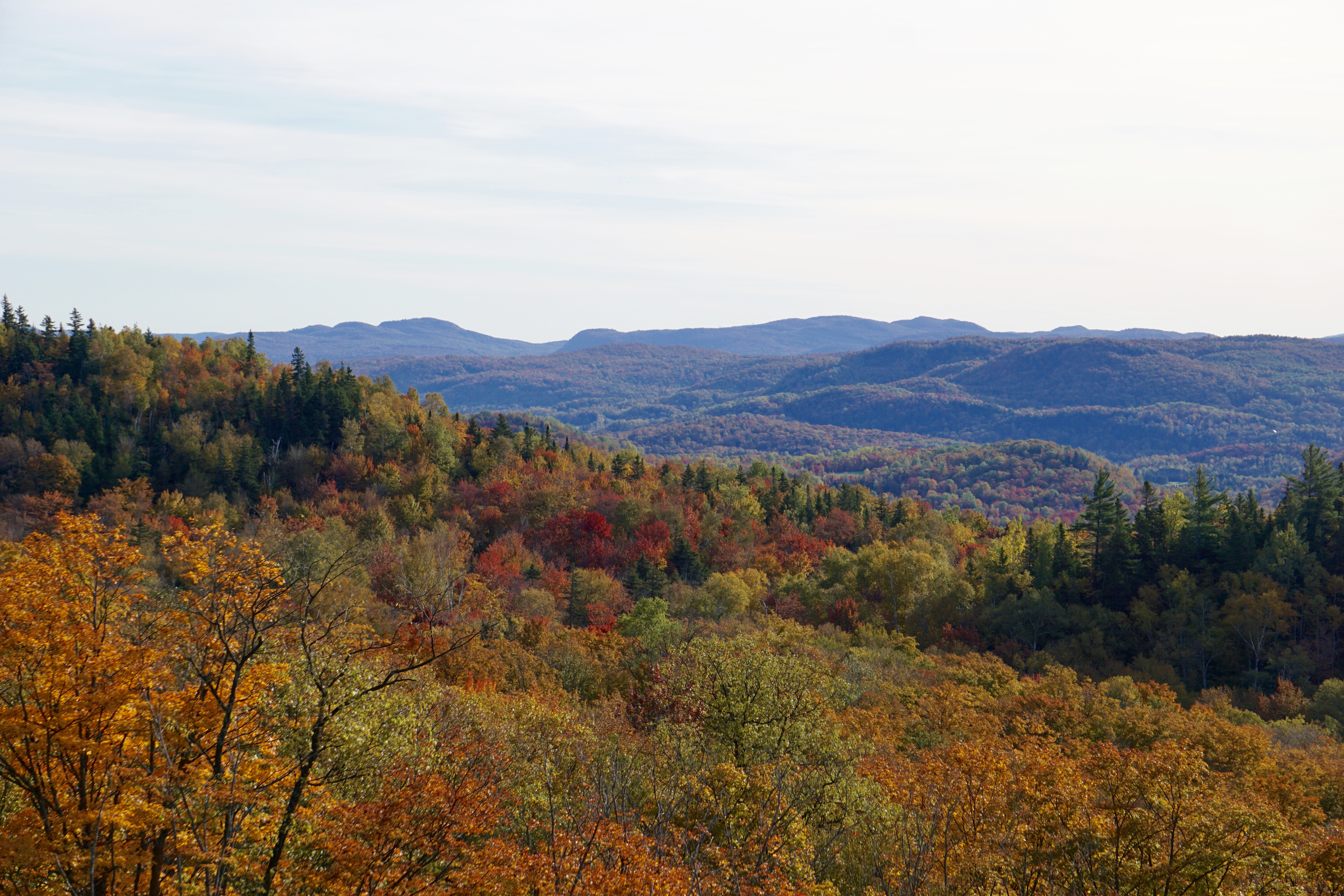
Fall foliage at Mont Tremblant

The park is part of the climax area of sugarbush to yellow birch. The tops of the hills and the valley Macaza, on the north, have the start of the range of fir yellow birch. The "Carcan" (Straitjacket) and Mount Tremblant has meanwhile a succession of forest land from the sugar maple to balsam fir.

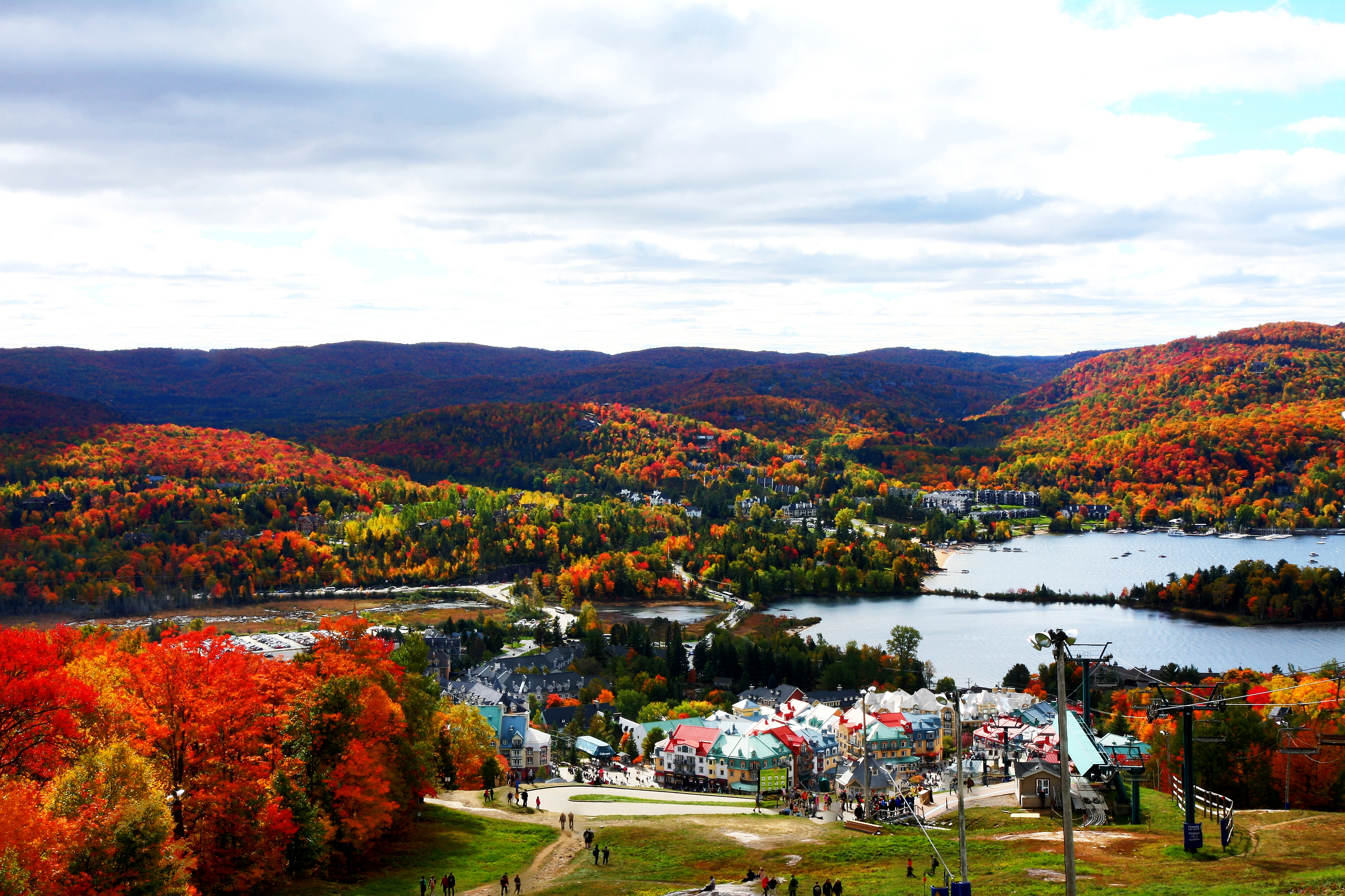
Beautiful colors of the fall season at Mont Tremblant.

The main tree species are the sugar maple, the red maple, the yellow birch, the white birch, the beech, the aspen, the balsam fir, the white spruce, the red spruce and the black spruce. It also includes individuals of hemlock, basswood and red oak which are at the northern limit of their distribution areas.

The park has 9 plants likely to be designated threatened or vulnerable, most of them located in the Lake Monroe. With the exception of Hieracium robinsonii and Listeria australis, watching other plants back 40 years and requires an update.

== Activities ==
=== Summer and fall ===
- Swimming
- Golfing
- Canoeing
- Canoe camping
- Fishing
- Hiking
- Backpacking
- Cycling
- Via ferrata

=== Winter ===
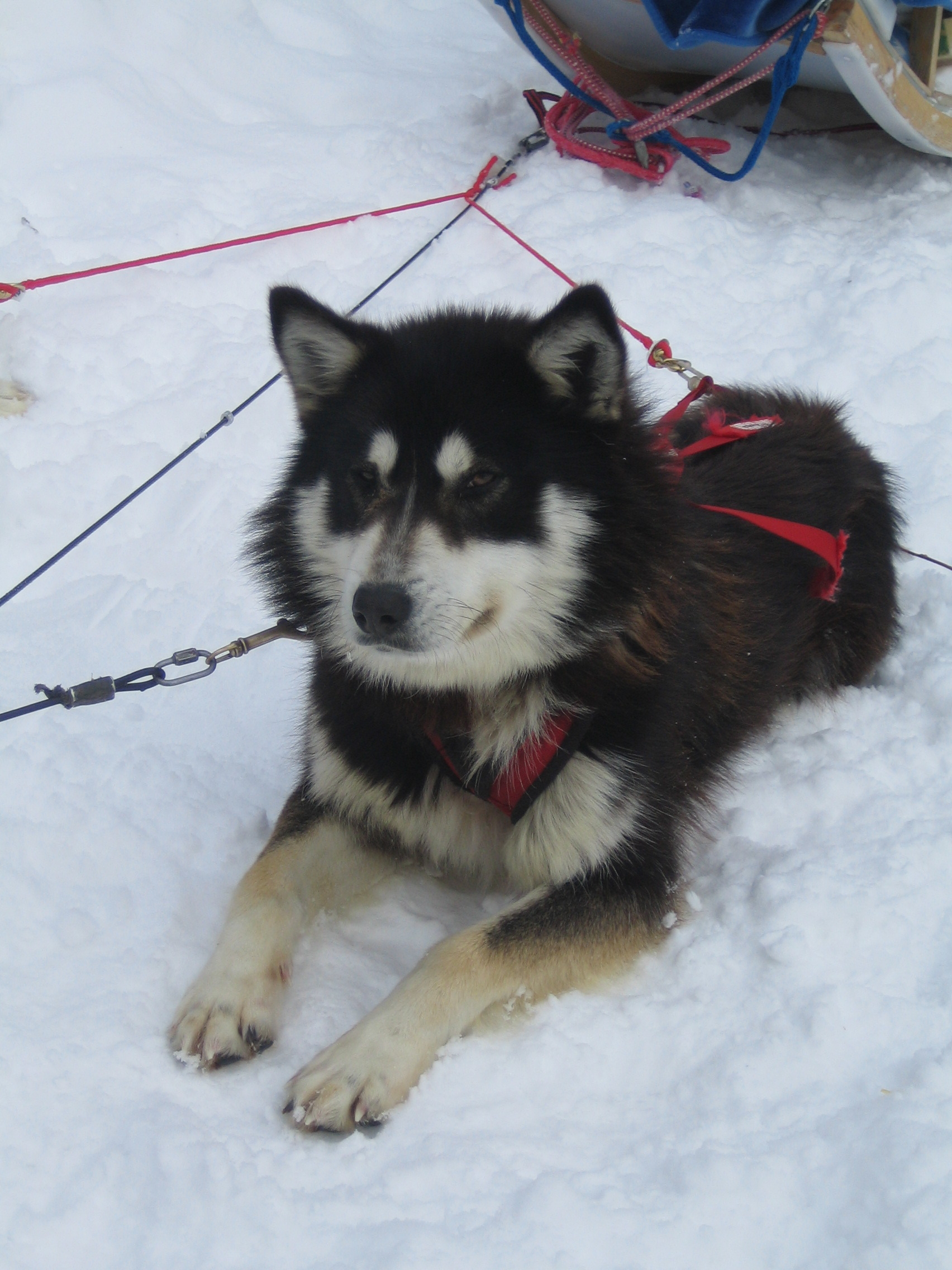
Husky sled.

- Snowshoeing
- Backcountry skiing (overnight trips)
- Snow walking
- Dog sled

== Gallery ==
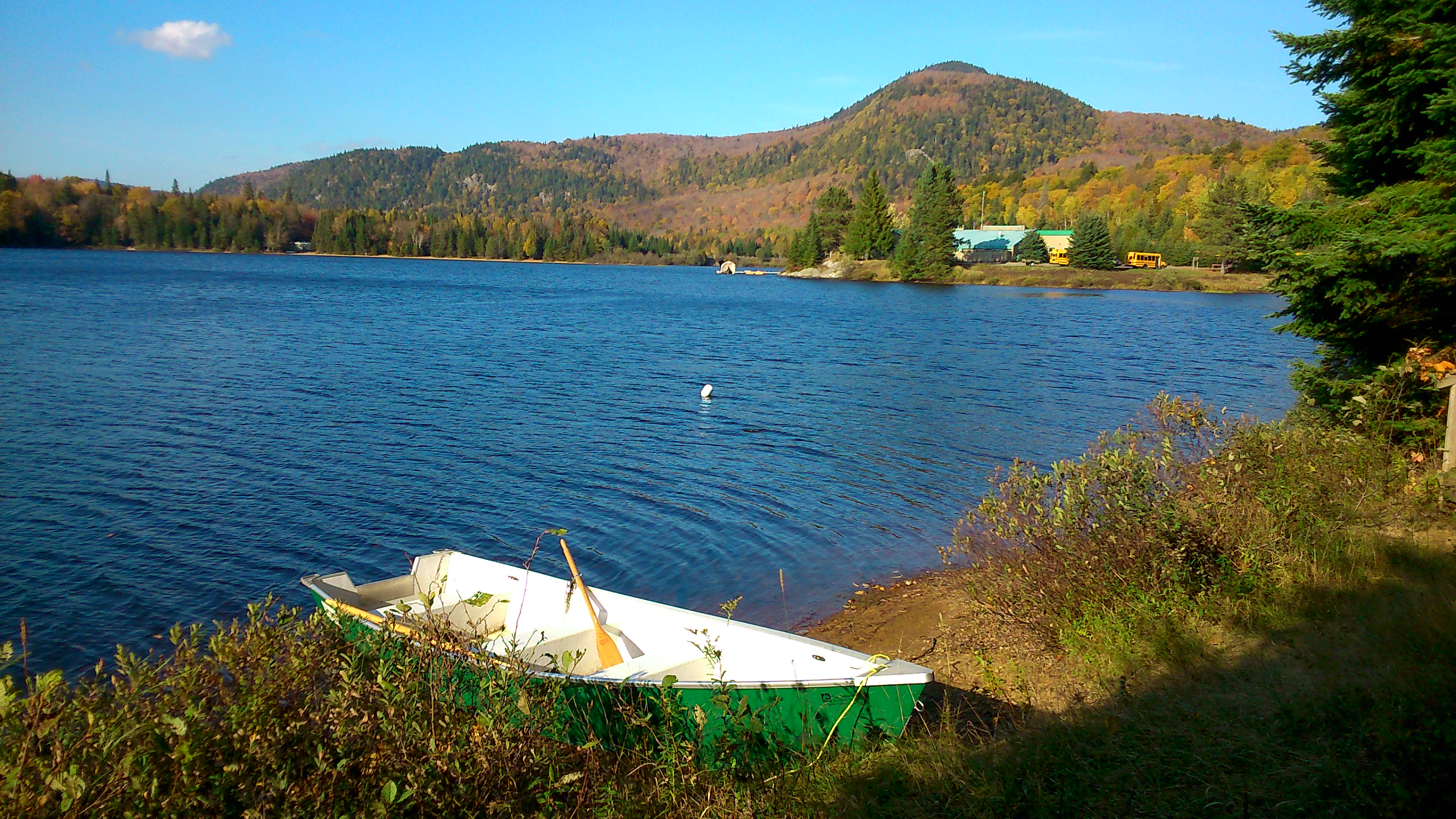
Rowboat on Lac Monroe

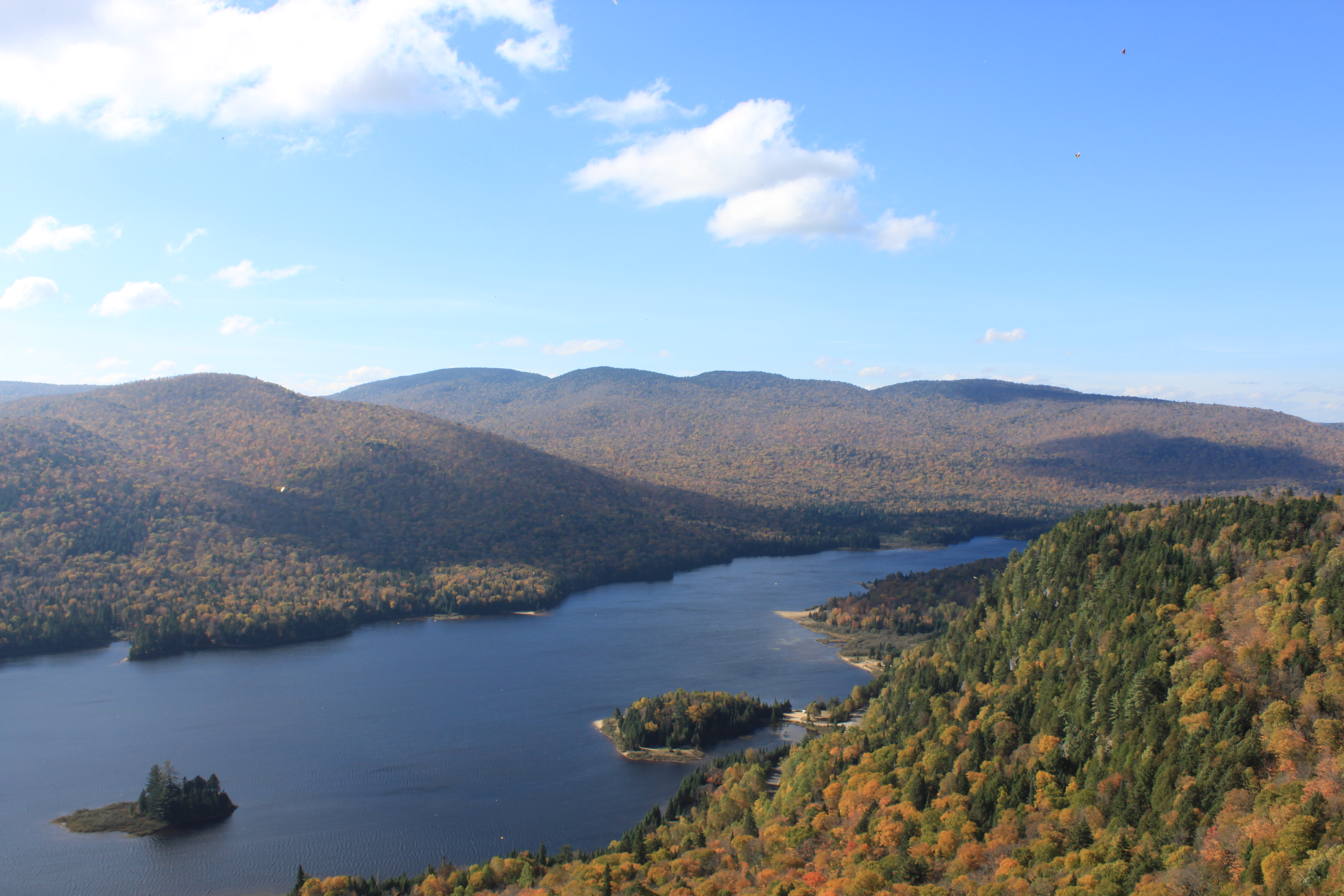
Fall view of Lac Monroe from the summit of La Corniche trail

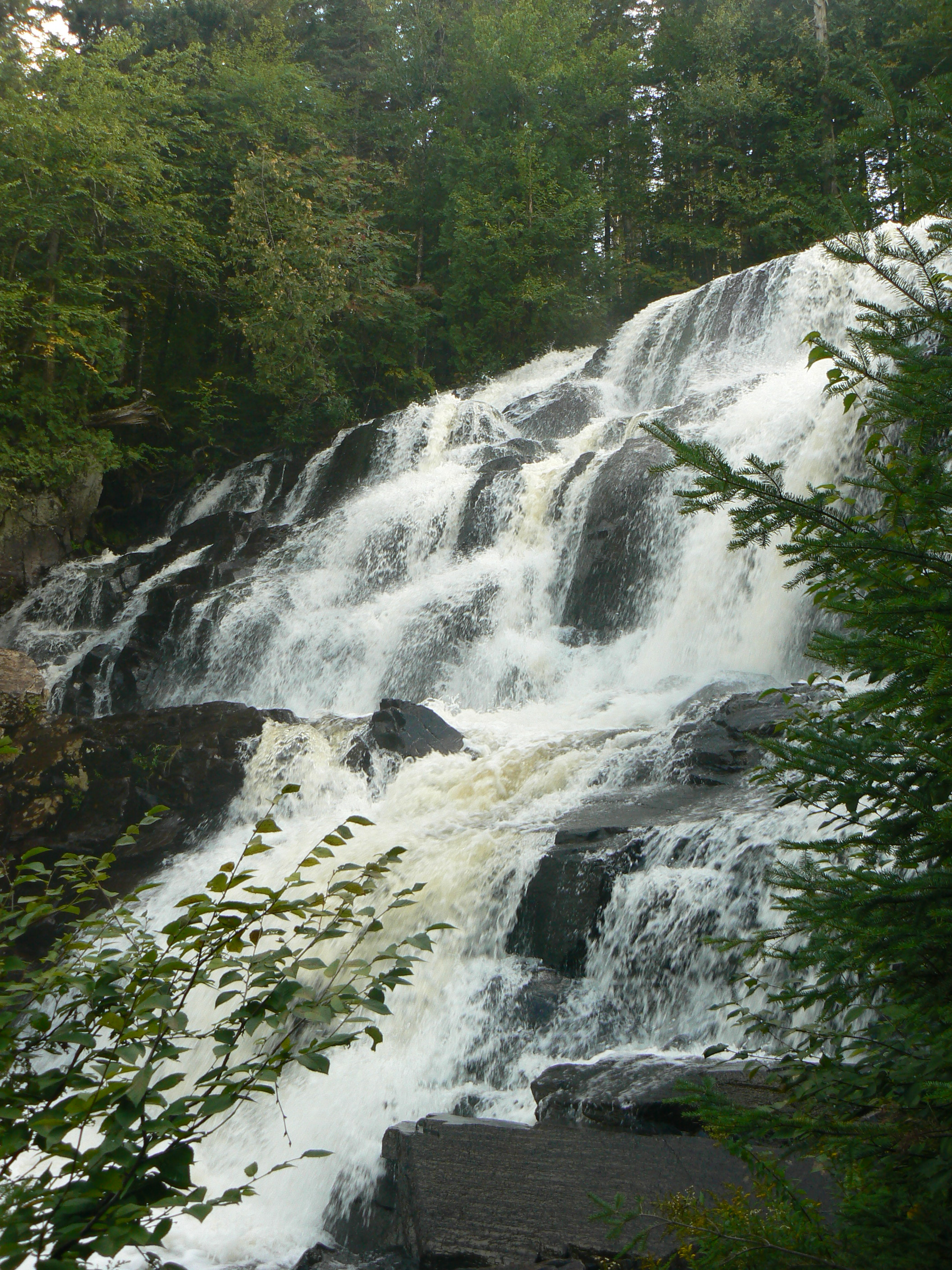
Chutes-aux-Rats

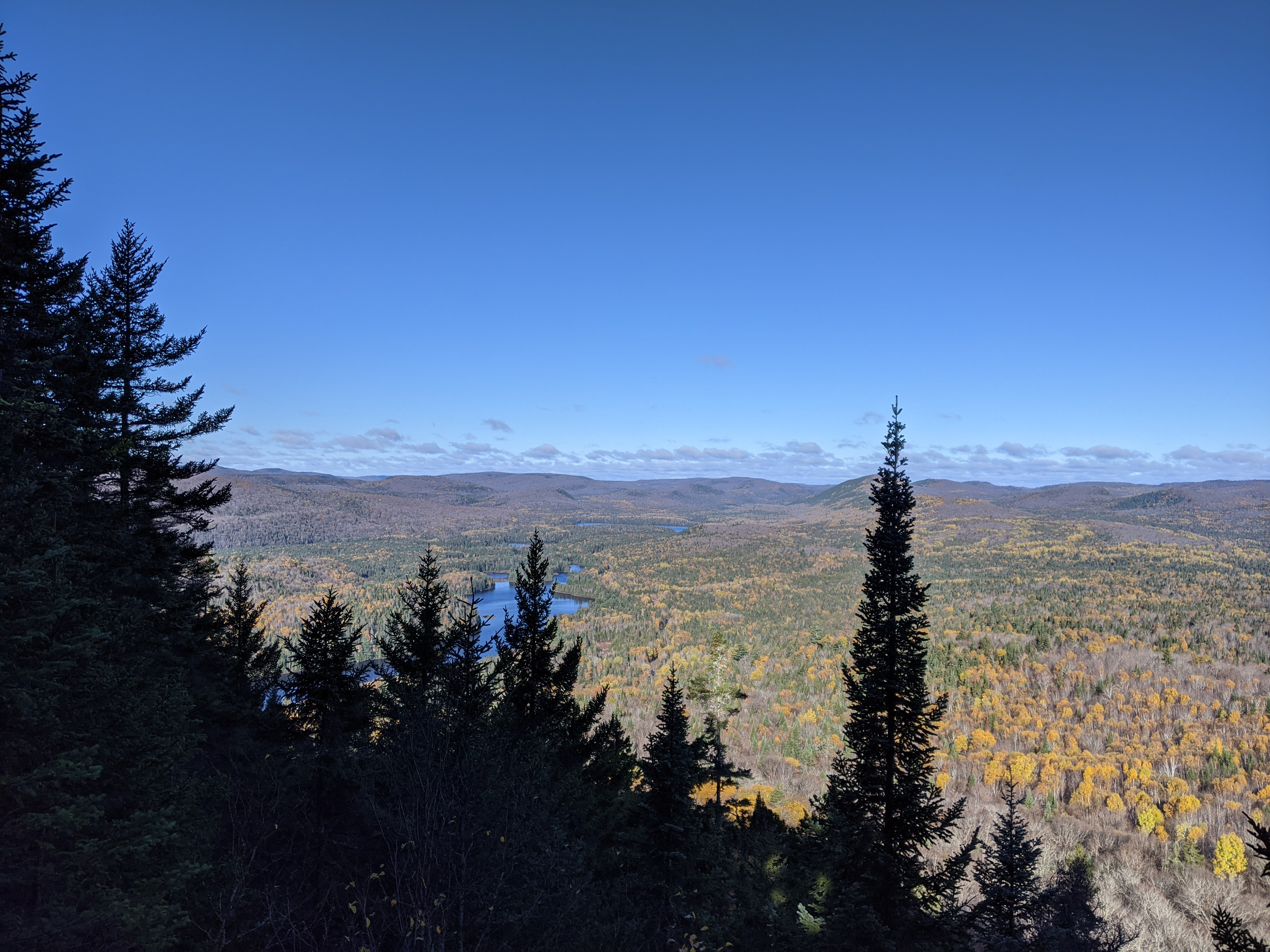
View of L'Assomption sector

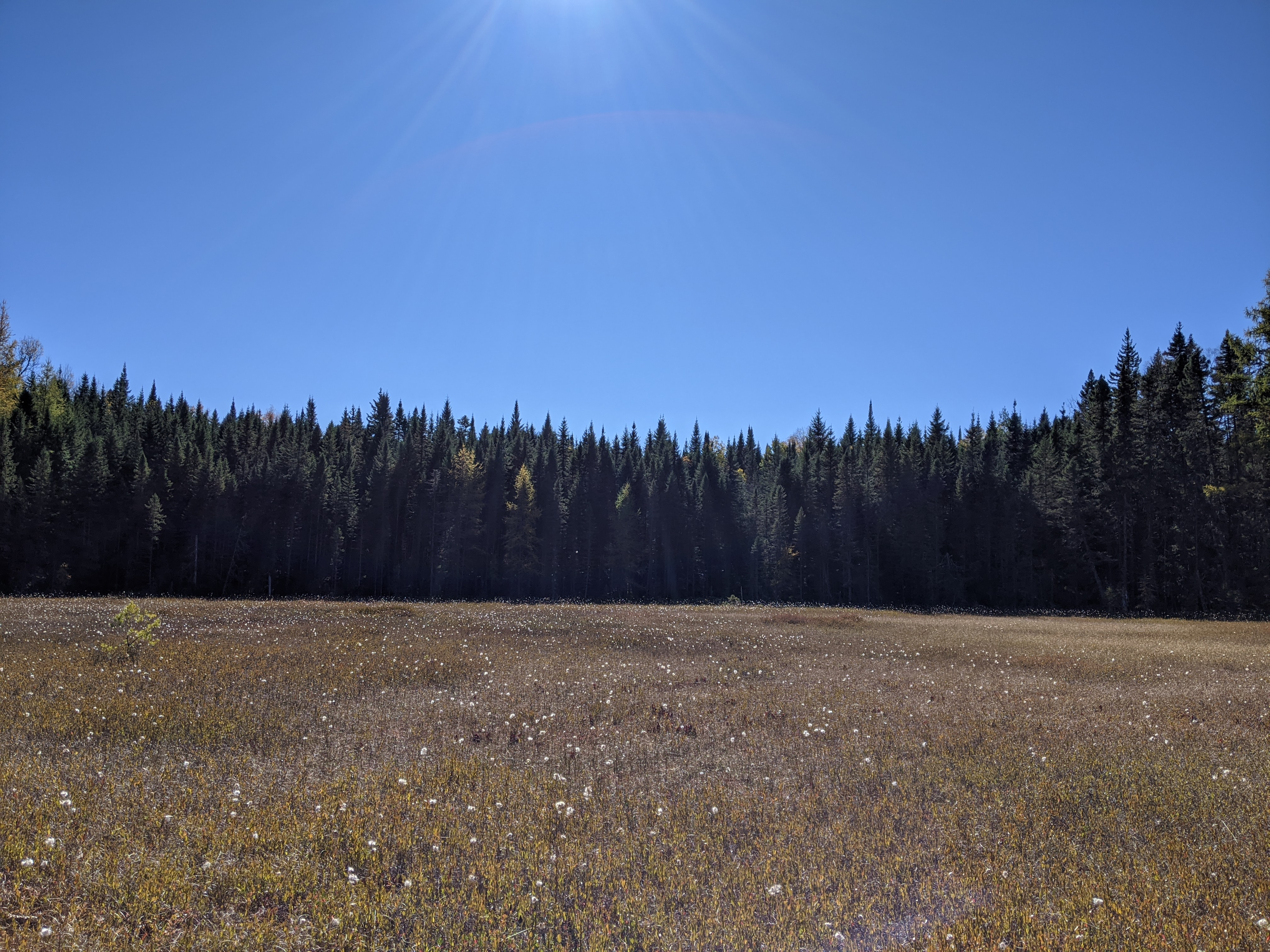
Peat bog near Lac de l'Assomption

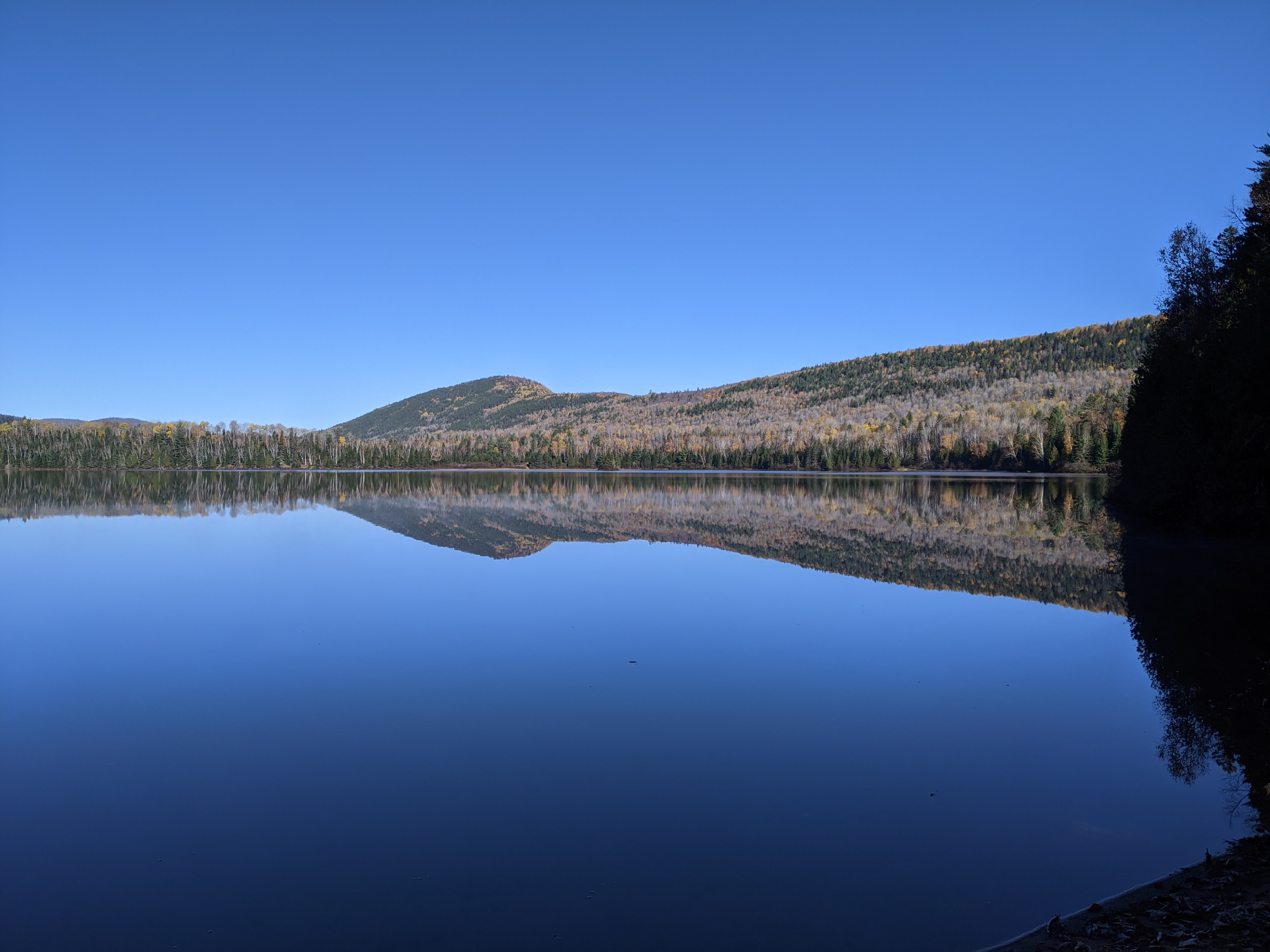
Lac de l'Assomption

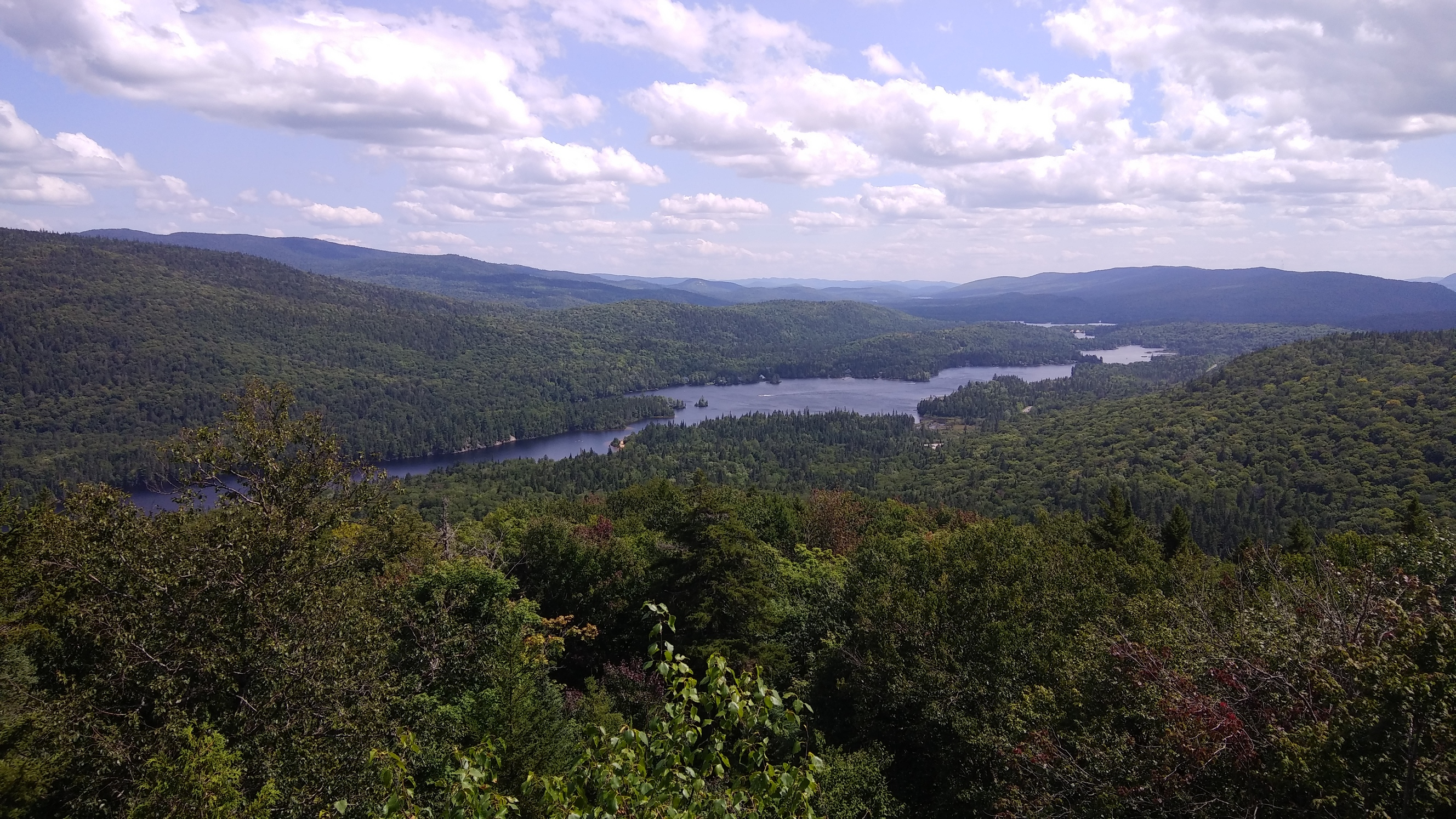
View of Provost lake from the summit of L'Envol trail

== See also ==
- List of birds of Mont-Tremblant National Park
- National Parks of Canada
- List of National Parks of Canada
- List of Quebec national parks
- Rouge-Matawin Wildlife Reserve
- Mont-Tremblant, municipality
- Zec Lavigne, neighbourg zec
- Laurentides, administrative region
- Lanaudière, administrative region
- Les Laurentides Regional County Municipality
- Antoine-Labelle Regional County Municipality
- Matawinie Regional County Municipality
