= Zec Lavigne =

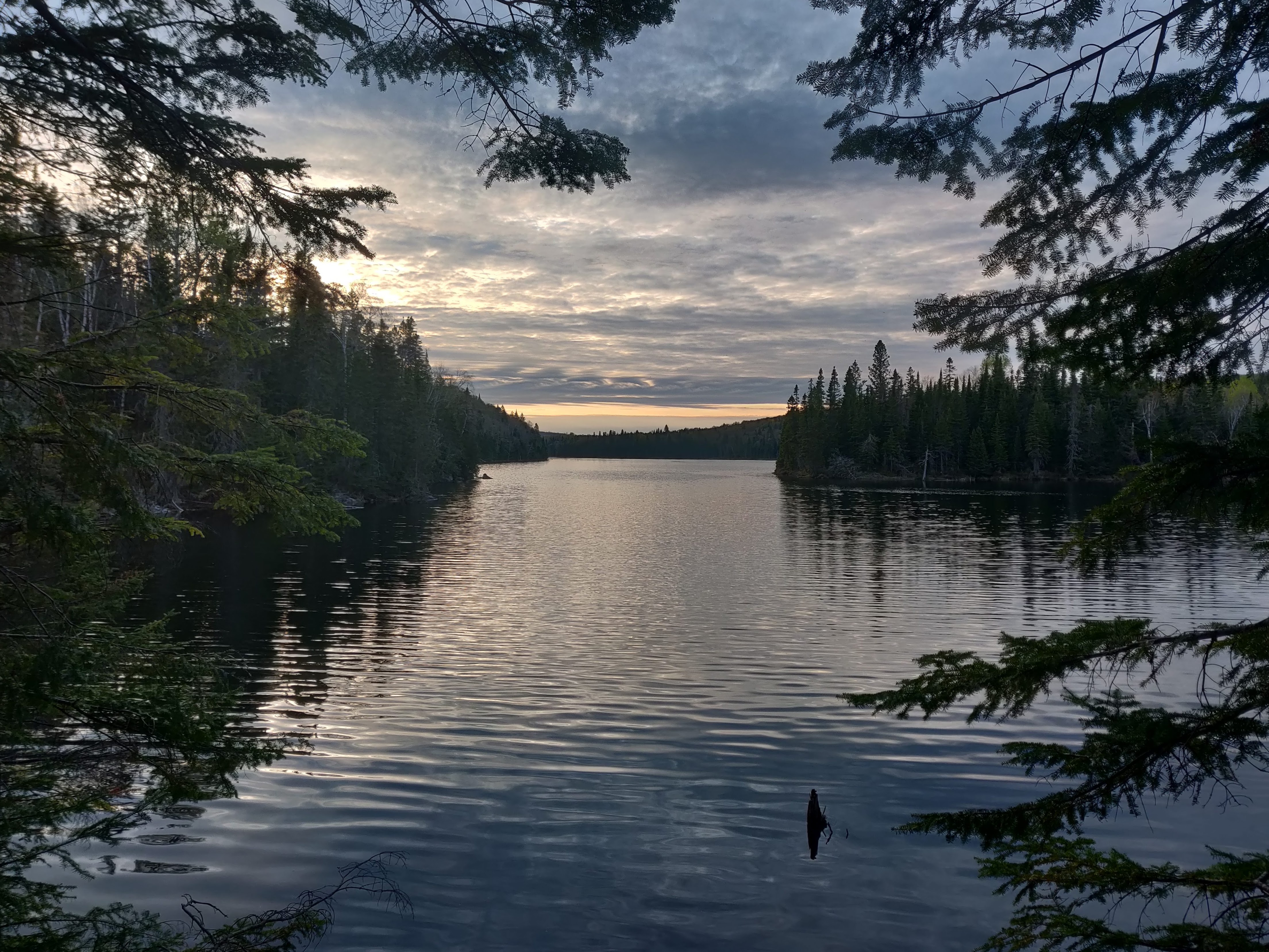
- Last moments of twilight over lake Hull.

- Location within Quebec
- Location: Canada; Québec; Matawinie
- Nearest city: Joliette
- Coordinates: 46°25′N 73°52′W
- Area: 406.31 square kilometres (156.88 sq mi)
- Established: 1978
- Governing body: Association de chasse et pêche Lavigne inc.

The Zec Lavigne is a "zone d'exploitation contrôlée" (Controlled harvesting zone) (ZEC) located at north of Saint-Côme, in administrative region of Lanaudière, in Quebec, in Canada. Created in 1978, this zec is 406.31 square kilometres (156.88 sq mi) and is managed by the "Association de chasse et pêche Lavigne inc".

== Geography ==
Zec Lavigne is bordered on the west by the Mont-Tremblant National Park.

== See also ==
- Lanaudière, administrative region
- Saint-Côme, municipality
- Mont-Tremblant National Park, neighbour of the zec
- Zone d'exploitation contrôlée (controlled harvesting zone) (ZEC)
