= Lac-Matawin =

- Unorganized territory
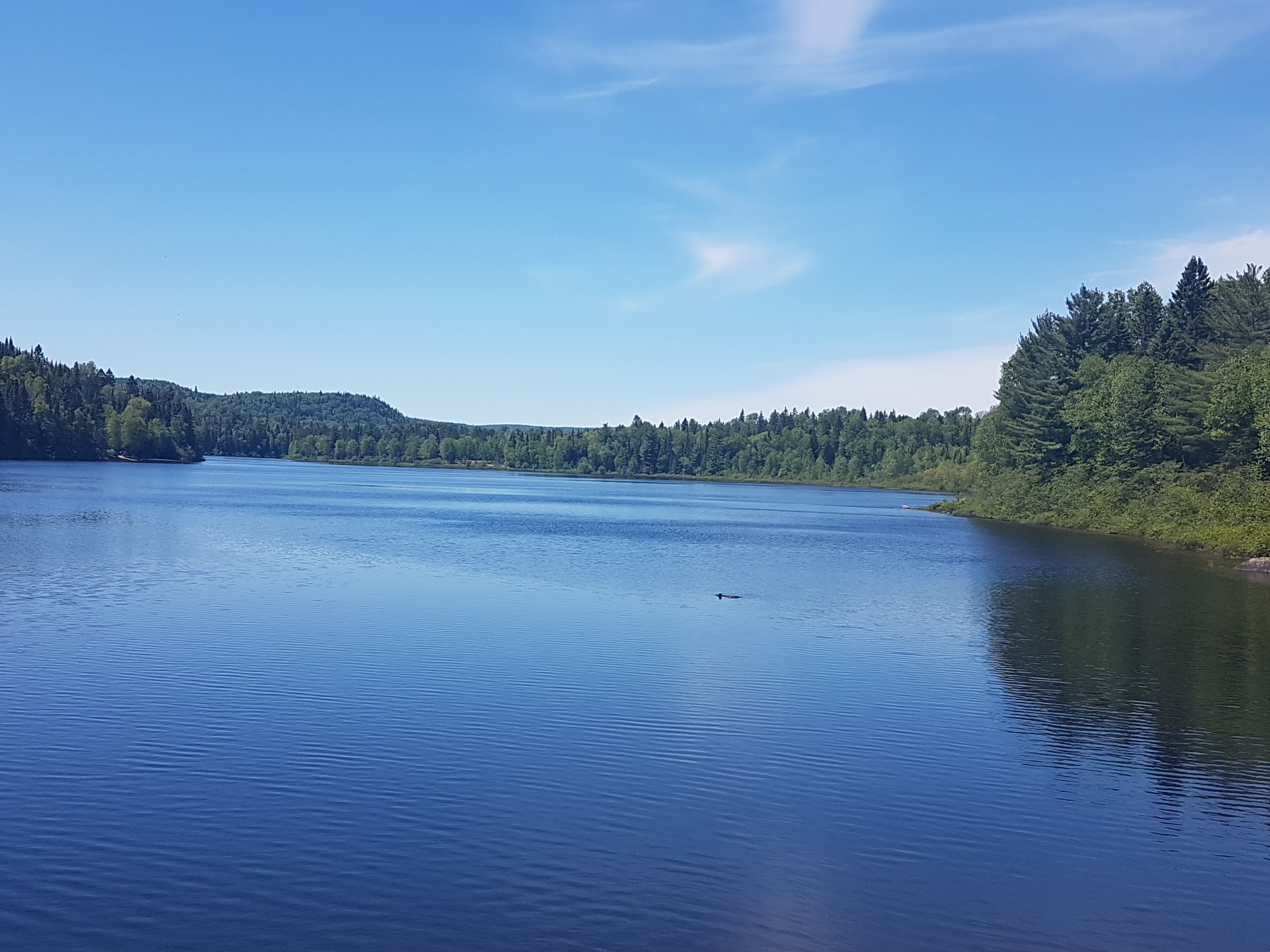
- Lake Charland

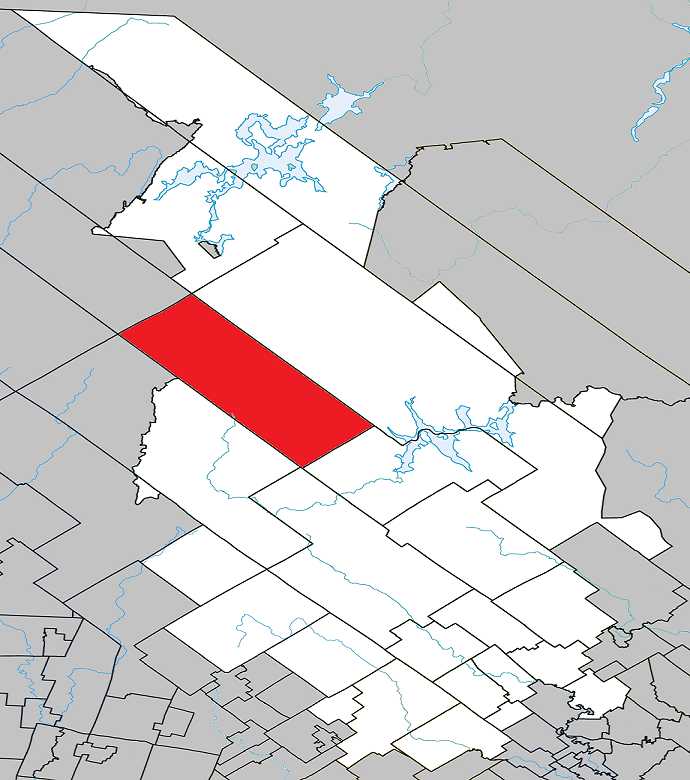
- Location within Matawinie RCM

- Location in central Quebec
- Coordinates: 46°49′N 74°18′W
- Country: Canada
- Province: Quebec
- Region: Lanaudière
- RCM: Matawinie
- Constituted: January 1, 1986

Government
  - Fed. riding: Joliette—Manawan
  - Prov. riding: Berthier

Area
  - Total: 796.58 km^{2} (307.56 sq mi)
  - Land: 759.12 km^{2} (293.10 sq mi)

Population (2021)
  - Total: 10
  - Density: 0/km^{2} (0/sq mi)
  - Change 2016-21: 0.0%
  - Dwellings: 53
- Time zone: UTC−5 (EST)
  - Summer (DST): UTC−4 (EDT)
- Highways: No major routes

Lac-Matawin is an unorganized territory in the Lanaudière region of Quebec, Canada, part of the Matawinie Regional County Municipality.

The namesake Lake Matawin is located within the territory. Its outflow is the Matawin River, a tributary of the Saint-Maurice River. Matawin comes from the Algonquin language, meaning "meeting of waters" or "confluence".

== Demographics ==
Historical census populations – Lac-Matawin
Year	Pop.	±%
1996	12	—
2001	10	−16.7%
2006	10	+0.0%
2011	15	+50.0%
2016	10	−33.3%
2021	10	+0.0%
Source: Statistics Canada

== See also ==
- List of unorganized territories in Quebec
