= List of townships in Quebec =

This article lists the townships of Quebec in Canada. The townships (French: canton) no longer represent administrative divisions recognized by the Ministry of Municipal Affairs and Housing (Quebec) (MAMH). Only municipal townships, formed from one or more townships, such as township municipalities and united township municipalities, are recognized. Many geographic townships are still conterminous with municipalities.

Name	Proclaimed date	Area (km^{2})	Location	Region	Geographic coordinates
Abbadie	1965-06-05	324	Lac-Walker	Côte-Nord	50.41666667°N 67°W
Abercromby	1842-08-24	93	Saint-Hippolyte	Laurentides	45.91666667°N 74°W
Aberdeen	1870-08-29	257	Rapides-des-Joachims	Outaouais	46.2667°N 77.7°W
Aberford	1869-11-20	259	Les Lacs-du-Témiscamingue	Outaouais, Abitibi-Témiscamingue	46.333330555556°N 77.933330555556°W
Achintre		259	La Tuque	Mauricie	48.266669444444°N 75.216669444444°W
Acton	1806-07-22	335.65	Saint-Théodore-d'Acton	Montérégie	45.666666666667°N 72.583333333333°W
Adams	1965-12-18	123.9	La Tuque	Mauricie	47.733333333333°N 72.966666666667°W
Addington	1892-08-13	186.5	Saint-Émile-de-Suffolk	Outaouais	46.05°N 74.93333°W
Adhémar	1966-05-14	246.05	Senneterre	Abitibi-Témiscamingue	48.8°N 76.366666666667°W
Adstock	1869-09-16	224.6	Adstock	Chaudière-Appalaches	46°N 71.083333333333°W
Aguanish	1869-04-24	234.7	Aguanish	Côte-Nord	50.25°N 62°W
Aigremont	1965-02-20	246.05	Lac-Ashuapmushuan	Saguenay–Lac-Saint-Jean	49.283333333333°N 73.916666666667°W
Aiguebelle	1916-12-16	260.05	Rouyn-Noranda	Abitibi-Témiscamingue	48.5°N 78.75°W
Aiguillon	1965-05-06	259	Rivière-Mistassini	Saguenay–Lac-Saint-Jean	49.58333°N 73.25°W
Ailleboust	1965-05-06	259	Lac-Ashuapmushuan	Saguenay–Lac-Saint-Jean	48.983333°N 73.25°W
Ailly	1965-02-20	259	Baie-James	Nord-du-Québec	49.6667°N 76.5°W
Albanel	1883-04-28	202.35	Albanel	Saguenay–Lac-Saint-Jean	48.9167°N 72.4167°W
Albani	1965-12-18	349.65	La Tuque	Mauricie	47.966666°N 73.483333°W
Albert	1871-08-04	197.9	Sacré-Cœur	Côte-Nord	48.3°N 69.916666666667°W
Aldfield	1852-11-20	196.3	La Pêche	Outaouais	45.733333°N 76.233333°W
Allard	1906-05-26	270.9	Saint-Alexis-des-Monts	Mauricie	46.75°N 73.25°W
Allemand	1906-05-26	259	Les Lacs-du-Témiscamingue	Abitibi-Témiscamingue	47.633333°N 78.233333°W
Alleyn	1864-12-17	178.05	Alleyn-et-Cawood	Outaouais	45.9167°N 76.25°W
Allouez	1966-05-14	257.7	Les Lacs-du-Témiscamingue	Abitibi-Témiscamingue	46.5°N 78.4167°W
Aloigny	1965-02-20	259	Eeyou Istchee Baie-James	Nord-du-Québec	49.6667°N 78.3333°W
Alton	1841-06-21	98.2	Saint-Alban	Capitale-Nationale	46.75°N 72.0833°W
Amherst	1883-09-29	194.6	Amherst	Laurentides, Outaouais	46.05°N 74.766666666667°W
Amos	1965-05-06	259	Mont-Valin	Saguenay–Lac-Saint-Jean	49.316666666667°N 70.116666666667°W
Amyot	1965-12-18	142.45	Mauricie		47.75°N 74°W
Angers	1893-11-11	172.95	Rivière-Bonaventure	Gaspésie–Îles-de-la-Madeleine	48.3°N 66.116666666667°W
Ango	1965-05-06	148	Dégelis	Bas-Saint-Laurent	47.75°N 68.416666666667°W
Angoulème	1901-07-27	147.7	Mandeville	Lanaudière	46.5°N 73.5°W
Angoumois	1966-05-14	287.5	Lac-Pythonga	Outaouais	46.5°N 76.25°W
Anjou	1966-05-14	163.15	Lac-Nilgaut	Outaouais	46.366666666667°N 76.916666666667°W
Antoine	1936-11-01	224.3	Notre-Dame-de-Lorette	Saguenay–Lac-Saint-Jean	49.116666666667°N 72.366666666667°W
Anville	1965-02-20	155.4	Eeyou Istchee Baie-James	Nord-du-Québec	49.6667°N 75.25°W
Arago	1865-01-30	155.4	Saint-Marcel	Chaudière-Appalaches	46.916666°N 70.083333°W
Arcand	1965-12-18	284.9	Saint-Alexis-des-Monts	Mauricie, Lanaudière	46.25°N 74.333333333333°W
Archambault	1910-08-27	276.75	Saint-Donat	Laurentides	46.25°N 74.3333°W
Archipel-de-Blanc-Sablon	1907-07-20	4.85	Blanc-Sablon	Côte-Nord	51.3333°N 57.3333°W
Archipel-de-Kécarpoui	1908-02-01	126.4	Saint-Augustin	Côte-Nord	51.0833°N 58°W
Archipel-de-Ouapitagone	1908-10-17	33.8	Côte-Nord-du-Golfe-du-Saint-Laurent	Côte-Nord	50.0833°N 60.3333°W
Archipel-de-Saint-Augustin	1908-02-01	222.85	Saint-Augustin	Côte-Nord	50.1667°N 58.5°W
Archipel-de-Sainte-Marie	1908-04-04	19.15	Côte-Nord-du-Golfe-du-Saint-Laurent	Côte-Nord	50.1667°N 59.75°W
Archipel-de-Washicoutai	1908-11-28	10.6	Côte-Nord-du-Golfe-du-Saint-Laurent	Côte-Nord	50.0833°N 61°W
Archipel-du-Gros-Mécatina	1908-03-21	54	Gros-Mécatina	Côte-Nord	50.666666666667°N 59°W
Archipel-du-Petit-Mécatina	1908-03-21	58	Côte-Nord-du-Golfe-du-Saint-Laurent	Côte-Nord	50.416666666667°N 59.416666666667°W
Archipel-du-Vieux-Fort	1907-07-20	34.25	Bonne-Espérance	Côte-Nord	51.25°N 57.75°W
Argenson	1965-06-05	259	Lac-Ashuapmushuan	Saguenay–Lac-Saint-Jean	49°N 73.5°W
Armagh	1799-07-13	249.3	Armagh	Chaudière-Appalaches	46.8333°N 70.5°W
Armand	1864-02-13	218	Saint-Honoré-de-Témiscouata	Bas-Saint-Laurent	47.666661111111°N 69.166661111111°W
Arnaud	1868-05-02	174	Sept-Îles	Côte-Nord	50.25°N 66.5833°W
Arthabaska	1802-09-30	117.3	Victoriaville	Mauricie	46.0833°N 72°W
Artois	1966-05-14	147.65	Lac-Pythonga	Outaouais	46.3333°N 76.4167°W
Arundel	1857-07-18	126.25	Barkmere	Laurentides	46°N 74.5833°W
Ascot	1803-03-05	228.3	Sherbrooke	Estrie	45.5°N 71.9167°W
Ashburton	1868-07-04	161	Montmagny Regional County Municipality	Chaudière-Appalaches	46.866661111111°N 70.416661111111°W
Ashford	1821-05-28	283.3	Saint-Damase-de-L'Islet	Chaudière-Appalaches	47.2°N 70°W
Ashini	1965-05-06	259	Rivière-Mouchalagane	Côte-Nord	51.916666666667°N 66.666666666667°W
Ashuapmushuan	1864-05-14	186.15	Saint-Prime	Saguenay–Lac-Saint-Jean	48.583333°N 72.416666°W
Asselin	1965-06-05	228	Saint-Michel-du-Squatec	Bas-Saint-Laurent	47.833330555556°N 68.5°W
Assemetquagan	1882-05-05	318	Routhierville	Gaspésie–Îles-de-la-Madeleine, Bas-Saint-Laurent	48.166661111111°N 67°W
Assigny	1965-06-05	259	Rivière-Mistassini	Saguenay–Lac-Saint-Jean	50.1667°N 73°W
Aston	1806-02-17	191.35	Saint-Wenceslas	Centre-du-Québec	46.166666666667°N 72.333333333333°W
Atwater	1897-02-20	232.75	Les Lacs-du-Témiscamingue	Abitibi-Témiscamingue	47°N 78.9167°W
Aubin	1965-06-05	259	La Tuque	Mauricie	48.4167°N 74.3333°W
Aubry		187.35	Baie-de-la-Bouteille	Lanaudière	46.75°N 73.5833°W
Auckland	1806-03-04	249.75	Saint-Isidore-de-Clifton	Estrie	45.266666666667°N 71.483333333333°W
Auclair	1917-04-28	223	Auclair	Bas-Saint-Laurent	47.75°N 68.666661111111°W
Audubon	1965-06-05	269.35	Rivière-Mouchalagane	Côte-Nord	51.75°N 69.9167°W
Augier	1916-12-16	259	Senneterre	Abitibi-Témiscamingue	48.6667°N 76.75°W
Aulnay	1966-05-14	259	Les Lacs-du-Témiscamingue	Abitibi-Témiscamingue	47.5°N 77.75°W
Aulneau	1965-06-05	284.9	Mont-Valin	Saguenay–Lac-Saint-Jean	48.8333°N 71.25°W
Aumond	1861-05-18	202.35	Aumond	Outaouais	46.5°N 75.833333333333°W
Aunis	1966-05-14	183.9	Lac-Pythonga	Outaouais	46.25°N 76.4167°W
Auray	1966-05-14	108.8	Lac-Nilgaut	Outaouais	46.116666666667°N 77.116666666667°W
Auvergne	1966-05-14	253.8	Lac-Nilgaut	Outaouais	46.933333055556°N 76.9°W
Aux	1966-05-14	186.5	Lac-Pythonga	Outaouais	47.3333°N 76.25°W
Avaugour	1965-06-05	259	Lac-Ashuapmushuan	Saguenay–Lac-Saint-Jean	49°N 73.6667°W
Awantjish	1880-04-24	189.8	Saint-Moïse	Bas-Saint-Laurent	48.5°N 67.75°W
Aylmer	1848-01-29	112.7	Courcelles-Saint-Évariste	Chaudière-Appalaches	45.8333°N 71°W
Aylwin	1858-01-30	169.6	Kazabazua	Outaouais	45.9167°N 76.0833°W
Babel	1911-06-17	428.95	Lac-Walker	Côte-Nord	50.133333°N 66.933333°W
Baby	1895-06-22	266.2	Laverlochère-Angliers	Abitibi-Témiscamingue	47.5°N 79.25°W
Bacon	1965-02-20	259	Eeyou Istchee Baie-James	Nord-du-Québec	49.366666°N 78.75°W
Badeaux	1965-12-18	227.9	Mauricie; Lanaudière		46.95°N 73.516666°W
Bagot	1848-12-02	242.8	Saguenay–Lac-Saint-Jean		48.3333°N 70.9167°W
Baie-de-Gaspé-Nord	1842-01-01	113.3	Gaspésie–Îles-de-la-Madeleine		48.9167°N 64.4167°W
Baie-de-Gaspé-Sud	1842-01-01	122.85	Gaspésie–Îles-de-la-Madeleine		48.8333°N 64.5833°W
Baillairgé	1965-05-06	259	Saguenay–Lac-Saint-Jean; Mauricie		48.666666666667°N 73.916666666667°W
Baillargeon	1866-10-27	181.55	Gaspésie–Îles-de-la-Madeleine		48.75°N 64.75°W
Bailloquet	1965-06-05	259	Côte-Nord		50.4167°N 65.1667°W
Bailly	1966-05-14	90.65	Abitibi-Témiscamingue; Nord-du-Québec		48.933333333333°N 75.566666666667°W
Baldwin	1920-04-24	344	Mont-Albert	Gaspésie–Îles-de-la-Madeleine	48.666666666667°N 65.966666666667°W
Balète		264.2	Mauricie; Nord-du-Québec		49°N 74.75°W
Bapst	1965-02-26	256.4	Nord-du-Québec		49.8333°N 78.5°W
Bardy	1965-12-18	253.8	Mauricie		47.6667°N 73.4167°W
Barford	1802-04-15	158.95	Estrie		45.0833°N 71.75°W
Baril	1965-12-18	259	Mauricie		47.1667°N 73.1667°W
Barlow	1965-02-20	243.45	Nord-du-Québec		49.9167°N 74.5833°W
Barnston	1801-11-04	261.35	Coaticook (ville)	Estrie	45.083333333333°N 71.916666666667°W
Barraute	1916-12-16	256.65	Abitibi-Témiscamingue		48.5°N 77.6667°W
Barrin	1965-02-20	259	Nord-du-Québec		49.25°N 77.6667°W
Barry	1966-05-14	256.4	Abitibi-Témiscamingue; Nord-du-Québec		48.933333333333°N 75.716666666667°W
Bartouille	1916-12-16	288.35	Abitibi-Témiscamingue		48.75°N 77.1667°W
Baskatong	1894-03-03	227.85	Outaouais		46.75°N 75.9167°W
Basserode	1920-10-16	260.95	Abitibi-Témiscamingue		47.9167°N 78.75°W
Basset	1965-05-06	259	Rivière-Mouchalagane	Côte-Nord	52.65°N 67.083333333333°W
Baune	1908-03-21	189	Abitibi-Témiscamingue		50.5°N 59.8333°W
Bauneville	1920-10-16	168.55	Abitibi-Témiscamingue		47.6667°N 78.5833°W
Bayfield	1965-06-05	259	Côte-Nord		49.1667°N 69.9167°W
Bazin	1965-06-05	259	Mauricie		48°N 74.75°W
Béarn	1916-12-16	257.4	Abitibi-Témiscamingue		48.75°N 78.083333333333°W
Beaubien	1920-10-16	54.45	Chaudière-Appalaches		46.9167°N 70.1667°W
Beauchastel	1916-12-16	262.8	Abitibi-Témiscamingue		48.25°N 79.1667°W
Beaucours	1965-02-20	189.05	Nord-du-Québec		49.0833°N 74.5833°W
Beaudet	1917-02-24	177.15	Saguenay–Lac-Saint-Jean		49.0833°N 72.5°W
Beaudoin	1965-05-06	259	Caniapiscau	Côte-Nord	52.21666667°N 67.8°W
Beaulieu	1965-02-20	243.45	Nord-du-Québec		50.25°N 74.3333°W
Beaumesnil	1920-10-16	264.6	Abitibi-Témiscamingue		47.75°N 79°W
Beaumouchel	1966-05-14	261.6	Abitibi-Témiscamingue		47.25°N 77.0833°W
Beauregard	1965-05-06	259	Rivière-Mistassini	Saguenay–Lac-Saint-Jean	50.433333333333°N 73.016666666667°W
Beaussier	1965-05-06	297.85	Havre-Saint-Pierre	Côte-Nord	50.283333333333°N 63.383333333333°W
Beauvais	1965-06-05	100.35	Côte-Nord		50.4167°N 66.6667°W
Bécart	1940-10-02	291.4	Saguenay–Lac-Saint-Jean		48.083333333333°N 72.666666666667°W
Bédard	1919-12-13	226.65	Les Basques	Bas-Saint-Laurent	48.05°N 68.75°W
Bedout	1965-05-06	227.9	Lac-au-Brochet	Côte-Nord	49.3°N 69.45°W
Bégin	1920-10-16	193.75	Bégin	Saguenay–Lac-Saint-Jean	48.666666666667°N 71.333333333333°W
Bégon	1869-11-20	136.8	Les Basques	Bas-Saint-Laurent	48°N 69.033330555556°W
Béland	1858-01-30	259	Saguenay–Lac-Saint-Jean		48.833333333333°N 73.25°W
Bélanger	1965-05-06	259	Côte-Nord		51.916666666667°N 67.333333333333°W
Béliveau	1966-05-14	147.65	Outaouais		46.333333333333°N 76.25°W
Belle-Roche	1965-05-06	264.2	Rivière-Mouchalagane	Côte-Nord	51.666666666667°N 67.833333333333°W
Belleau	1868-07-04	202.25	Mauricie		46.5833°N 73.0833°W
Bellechasse	1871-04-29	150	Les Etchemins	Chaudière-Appalaches	46.5°N 70.25°W
Bellecombe	1920-10-16	261.95	Abitibi-Témiscamingue		48.0833°N 79°W
Bellecourt	1908-03-21	129.5	Côte-Nord		50.5°N 59.6667°W
Bellefeuille	1936-01-11	240.8	Abitibi-Témiscamingue		47.25°N 78.6667°W
Bellerive	1966-06-08	253.8	Eeyou Istchee Baie-James	Nord-du-Québec	50.416666666667°N 75.583333333333°W
Belmont	1965-02-20	243.45	Eeyou Istchee Baie-James	Nord-du-Québec	49.133333333333°N 75.416666666667°W
Belvèze	1965-06-05	259	Saguenay–Lac-Saint-Jean		49.8333°N 73.25°W
Benoist	1965-02-20	259	Nord-du-Québec		49.3333°N 76.3333°W
Béraud	1920-10-16	259	Abitibi-Témiscamingue		47.916666666667°N 78.333333333333°W
Beresford	1852-01-24	125.45	Laurentides		46.0833°N 74.3333°W
Berey	1965-02-20	238.3	Nord-du-Québec		50.0833°N 75.6667°W
Bergères	1965-02-20	259	Nord-du-Québec		49.5°N 76.75°W
Bergeron	1965-06-05	259	Côte-Nord		52.3333°N 67.3333°W
Bergeronnes	1874-08-15	271.15	Côte-Nord		48.3333°N 69.5833°W
Berlinguet	1965-05-06	259	Saguenay–Lac-Saint-Jean; Mauricie		48.75°N 74.166666666667°W
Bernard	1965-05-06	259	Rivière-Mouchalagane	Côte-Nord	52.083333333333°N 69.666666666667°W
Bernetz	1916-12-16	257.5	Abitibi-Témiscamingue; Nord-du-Québec		48.93333°N 77.66666°W
Bernier	1965-06-05	92.85	Abitibi-Témiscamingue		48.5°N 75.5833°W
Bernières	1965-06-05	256.4	Nord-du-Québec		50.0833°N 76.3333°W
Berry	1916-12-16	258.3	Berry	Abitibi-Témiscamingue	48.8°N 78.316666666667°W
Berthelet	1965-06-05	253.8	Côte-Nord		51.75°N 68.25°W
Berthelot	1966-05-14	259	Abitibi-Témiscamingue		48.5°N 76.1667°W
Berthiaume	1965-02-20	259	Nord-du-Québec		49.5°N 77°W
Beschefer	1965-02-20	253.8	Nord-du-Québec		49.8333°N 78.75°W
Betsiamites	1867-10-26	218.55	Côte-Nord		48.9167°N 68.8333°W
Biard	1965-12-18	284.9	Mauricie		47.9167°N 72.4167°W
Bibaud		259	Saguenay–Lac-Saint-Jean		48.8333°N 73.5°W
Bickerdike	1901-01-19	271.15	Mauricie		47.6667°N 72.5°W
Biencourt	1920-10-16	195	Biencourt	Bas-Saint-Laurent	47.95°N 68.633333333333°W
Bigelow	1861-04-13	92.25	Laurentides, Outaouais		46.05°N 75.633333333333°W
Bignell	1965-02-20	248.65	Saguenay–Lac-Saint-Jean, Nord-du-Québec		50.083333333333°N 73.916666666667°W
Bisaillon	1965-12-18	336.7	Mauricie		47.4167°N 73.4167°W
Bissot	1908-12-05	157.85	Côte-Nord		50.3333°N 61.1667°W
Blaiklock	1965-02-20	246.05	Eeyou Istchee Baie-James	Nord-du-Québec	50.083333°N 74.333333°W
Blais	1919-09-27	187	La Matapédia	Bas-Saint-Laurent	48.533330555556°N 67.266661111111°W
Blake	1920-10-16	258.6	Laurentides, Outaouais		46.1°N 75.783333333333°W
Blanche	1919-02-20	267.1	Côte-Nord		50.25°N 65.8333°W
Blanchet	1866-11-24	137.65	Gaspésie–Îles-de-la-Madeleine		49°N 64.75°W
Blanchin	1965-06-05	259	Côte-Nord		51.9167°N 69.9167°W
Blandford	1823-04-30	221.45	Mauricie		46.3333°N 72°W
Blondeau	1936-01-11	306.28	Abitibi-Témiscamingue		47.3333°N 78.8333°W
Blondel	1965-06-05	306.35	Côte-Nord		51.9167°N 69.25°W
Bochart	1965-06-05	259	Saguenay–Lac-Saint-Jean		49.0833°N 73.5°W
Boilleau	1916-12-16	169.95	Saguenay–Lac-Saint-Jean		48.0833°N 70.8333°W
Boily	1965-06-05	259	Côte-Nord		52.25°N 66.5833°W
Bois	1887-09-24	258.6	Rivière-à-Pierre	Capitale-Nationale	47.083333°N 72.216666°W
Boisbuisson	1936-01-11	352.1	Gaspésie–Îles-de-la-Madeleine		49°N 66°W
Boisclerc	1895-05-04	188.8	Abitibi-Témiscamingue		46.4167°N 78.6667°W
Boishébert	1908-02-01	226.65	Côte-Nord		50.8333°N 59.0833°W
Boisseau	1916-12-16	256.4	Abitibi-Témiscamingue		48.3333°N 76.75°W
Boivin	1940-02-10	252.95	Nord-du-Québec		49.25°N 79.4167°W
Bolduc	1965-06-05	259	Côte-Nord		51.9167°N 66.9167°W
Bolton	1797-08-18	355.6	Estrie; Montérégie		45.25°N 72.333333333333°W
Bongard	1966-05-14	256.4	Abitibi-Témiscamingue		48.3333°N 75.75°W
Bonin	1965-06-05	259	Mauricie		48.25°N 73.6667°W
Bonne	1936-01-11	261.6	Saguenay–Lac-Saint-Jean		50.25°N 73.4167°W
Bonne-Espérance	1936-01-11	222.6	Côte-Nord		51.5°N 57.5833°W
Bonnécamps	1936-01-11	246.05	Saguenay–Lac-Saint-Jean		50.25°N 73.4167°W
Booth	1908-03-21	212.9	Les Lacs-du-Témiscamingue	Abitibi-Témiscamingue	46.75°N 78.666666666667°W
Borgia	1965-12-18	176.1	La Tuque	Mauricie	47.85°N 72.483333333333°W
Bossé	1965-02-20	259	Nord-du-Québec		49.5°N 76.5°W
Botsford	1866-07-14	161.9	Saint-Marc-du-Lac-Long	Bas-Saint-Laurent	47.366661111111°N 68.966669444444°W
Bouat	1965-05-06	259	Rivière-Mouchalagane	Côte-Nord	52.333333°N 68.5°W
Boucault	1965-06-05	259	Côte-Nord		52.3333°N 68.0833°W
Boucher	1875-02-06	218.55	Mauricie		47.0833°N 72.8333°W
Bouchette	1858-03-30	240.8	Bouchette	Outaouais	46.25°N 76.0833°W
Bougainville	1907-07-20	238.75	Saint-Augustin, Côte-Nord, Quebec	Côte-Nord	51.316666666667°N 58.55°W
Boullé		280.05	Lanaudière		47°N 74.3333°W
Bourassa	1965-06-05	264.2	Mauricie		48.25°N 73.9167°W
Bourbaux	1965-02-20	259	Nord-du-Québec		49.6667°N 77°W
Bourbon	1936-11-01	140.85	Girardville	Saguenay–Lac-Saint-Jean	49.133333333333°N 72.65°W
Bourbonnais	1966-05-14	261.6	Lac-Pythonga	Outaouais	46.933333333333°N 76.266666666667°W
Bourdages	1868-08-29	118.9	Montmagny Regional County Municipality	Chaudière-Appalaches	46.916661111111°N 70.266661111111°W
Bourdon	1911-08-05	194.25	Côte-Nord		49.3333°N 68°W
Bourgeoys	1965-12-18	292	Mauricie		47.5°N 72.6667°W
Bourget	1881-12-02	198.3	Saint-Ambroise	Saguenay–Lac-Saint-Jean	48.566666666667°N 71.383333333333°W
Bourgmont	1965-06-05	259	Abitibi-Témiscamingue		48.25°N 75.6667°W
Bourgogne	1966-05-14	196.85	Lac-Pythonga	Outaouais	46.233333°N 76.55°W
Bourlamaque	1920-10-16	267.7	Val-d'Or	Abitibi-Témiscamingue	48.083333°N 77.666666°W
Bourque	1965-02-20	259	Nord-du-Québec		49.25°N 78.75°W
Bousquet	1916-12-16	259.55	Abitibi-Témiscamingue		48.1667°N 78.5°W
Bouteroue	1965-02-20	243.45	Saguenay–Lac-Saint-Jean; Nord-du-Québec		49.333333333333°N 74.166666666667°W
Boutet	1921-05-07	352.1	La Matapédia	Bas-Saint-Laurent	48.583330555556°N 66.666661111111°W
Bouthillier	1920-10-16	272.35	Laurentides		46.4167°N 75.5°W
Bowman	1861-03-16	127.5	Bowman	Outaouais	45.9167°N 75.6667°W
Boyer	1920-10-16	144.2	Laurentides		46.5°N 75.1667°W
Boyvinet	1965-02-20	259	Nord-du-Québec		49.6667°N 76.0833°W
Brabazon	1965-06-05	259	Nord-du-Québec		49.3333°N 79°W
Brandon	1827-08-01	234.7	Saint-Gabriel-de-Brandon	Lanaudière	46.25°N 73.416666666667°W
Branssat	1965-06-05	248.65	Nord-du-Québec		49.9167°N 75.8333°W
Brassard	1965-06-05	176.05	Lanaudière		46.6667°N 74°W
Brassier	1916-12-16	263.15	Senneterre (ville)	Abitibi-Témiscamingue	48.5°N 77.016666°W
Brébeuf	1965-02-20	155.4	Saguenay–Lac-Saint-Jean		48.1667°N 70.5°W
Brécourt	1966-05-14	101	Senneterre (ville)	Abitibi-Témiscamingue	48.35°N 75.566666666667°W
Bréhaut	1965-12-18	328.95	Mauricie; Lanaudière		47°N 73.6667°W
Bressani	1965-06-05	248.65	Nord-du-Québec		49.0833°N 75°W
Brest	1907-01-06	174	Blanc-Sablon	Côte-Nord	51.5°N 57.25°W
Bretagne	1966-05-14	191.65	Lac-Nilgaut	Outaouais	46.1°N 76.4°W
Brézel	1965-06-05	259	Côte-Nord		51.9167°N 68.75°W
Briand	1966-06-08	412.8	Laurentides, Outaouais		47°N 76°W
Brie	1966-05-14	227.9	Outaouais		46.25°N 76.9167°W
Brien	1965-05-06	256.4	Rivière-Mouchalagane	Côte-Nord	51.666666°N 68.25°W
Bristol	1834-12-29	196.85	Bristol	Outaouais	45.583333333333°N 76.383333333333°W
Brochant	1965-02-20	158	Nord-du-Québec		49.6667°N 75°W
Brochu	1965-06-05	259	Mauricie		48.5833°N 74.5°W
Brodeur	1909-07-24	271.95	Abitibi-Témiscamingue		47.5°N 78.8333°W
Brome	1797-08-18	259	Lac-Brome	Montérégie	45.233333°N 72.583333°W
Brompton	1801-11-27	239.75	Estrie		45.5°N 72.0833°W
Brongniart	1965-02-20	158	Eeyou Istchee Baie-James	Nord-du-Québec	49.683333333333°N 74.75°W
Brouague	1907-07-20	234.7	Côte-Nord		51.4167°N 58.4167°W
Broughton	1880-10-28	258.6	Chaudière-Appalaches		46.25°N 71°W
Brouillan	1965-02-20	253.8	Nord-du-Québec		49.8333°N 79°W
Bruchési	1920-10-16	229.6	Abitibi-Témiscamingue		47.0833°N 79°W
Bruneau	1965-02-20	271.95	Nord-du-Québec		49.3333°N 77.1667°W
Brunet	1917-11-10	238.75	Laurentides		46.6667°N 75°W
Bruyas	1965-06-05	277.15	Côte-Nord		51.6667°N 69.25°W
Bryson	1920-10-16	237.45	Waltham	Outaouais	46.0833°N 76.9167°W
Buade		264.2	Saguenay–Lac-Saint-Jean		49°N 74.1667°W
Buckingham	1799-11-27	300.15	Gatineau	Outaouais	45.6667°N 75.5°W
Buckland	1806-11-26	195.4	Saint-Nazaire-de-Dorchester	Chaudière-Appalaches	46.583333333333°N 70.666666666667°W
Budemont	1965-05-06	259	Saguenay–Lac-Saint-Jean; Nord-du-Québec		50.25°N 73.5833°W
Buies	1965-05-06	259	La Tuque	Mauricie	48.083333333333°N 75.416666666667°W
Bullion	1965-06-05	259	Saguenay–Lac-Saint-Jean		49.5833°N 73°W
Bulstrode	1803-05-27	264.4	Mauricie		46.1667°N 72.0833°W
Bungay	1863-02-07	141.65	Kamouraska	Bas-Saint-Laurent	47.5°N 69.583338888889°W
Bureau	1965-06-05	259	Mauricie		48.25°N 74.1667°W
Bury	1803-03-15	249.3	Bury	Estrie	45.5°N 71.5°W
Buteux		266.75	Mauricie; Nord-du-Québec		48.983333°N 75.216666°W
By	1966-06-08	248.65	Mauricie; Nord-du-Québec		47.2°N 76.066666°W
Cabanac	1965-06-05	259	Côte-Nord		52.25°N 67.5833°W
Cabano	1866-07-28	257.8	Saint-Elzéar-de-Témiscouata	Bas-Saint-Laurent	47.583330555556°N 69°W
Cabot	1865-08-26	199.1	Saint-Moïse	Bas-Saint-Laurent	48.533333333333°N 67.916666666667°W
Cadieux	1965-12-18	271.95	Mauricie		47.8333°N 73.0833°W
Cadillac	1916-12-16	235.25	Rouyn-Noranda	Abitibi-Témiscamingue	48.216666666667°N 78.316666666667°W
Caire	1920-10-16	260.4	Rouyn-Noranda	Abitibi-Témiscamingue	47.933333°N 78.983333°W
Calcar	1966-05-14	256.4	Les Lacs-du-Témiscamingue	Abitibi-Témiscamingue	46.783333333333°N 78.233333333333°W
Callière	1864-06-18	199.9	Capitale-Nationale		47.5833°N 69.9167°W
Cambrai	1965-02-20	297.85	Abitibi-Témiscamingue		47.9167°N 76.5833°W
Cameron	1854-11-11	145.3	Sainte-Thérèse-de-la-Gatineau	Outaouais	46.233333°N 75.866666°W
Campbell	1899-07-15	238.8	Laurentides		46.5833°N 75.4167°W
Campeau	1920-10-16	378.8	Abitibi-Témiscamingue		46.5°N 78.8333°W
Cannon	1904-10-22	227.45	Port-Cartier	Côte-Nord	49.65°N 67.333333333333°W
Cap-Chat	1842	278.65	Gaspésie–Îles-de-la-Madeleine		49.0833°N 66.5833°W
Cap-des-Rosiers	1842-01-01	119	Gaspé	Gaspésie–Îles-de-la-Madeleine	48.85°N 64.266666111111°W
Cardinal	1966-05-14	259	Réservoir-Dozois	Abitibi-Témiscamingue	47.216666666667°N 76.466666666667°W
Carheil	1965-02-20	253.8	Nord-du-Québec		49.8333°N 79.25°W
Carignan	1875-02-10	375.95	La Tuque	Mauricie	47.166666°N 72.75°W
Carleton	1842	153	Gaspésie–Îles-de-la-Madeleine		48.1667°N 66.1667°W
Caron	1855-06-16	222.6	Métabetchouan–Lac-à-la-Croix	Saguenay–Lac-Saint-Jean	48.366666°N 71.816666°W
Carpentier	1916-12-16	259	Abitibi-Témiscamingue		48.5°N 77.5°W
Carpiquet	1965-02-20	233.1	Nord-du-Québec		49.0833°N 75.8333°W
Carqueville	1965-02-20	259	Eeyou Istchee Baie-James	Nord-du-Québec	49.216666°N 78.533333°W
Cartier	1864-11-19	177.6	Saint-Guillaume-Nord	Lanaudière	46.333333333333°N 73.916666666667°W
Casa-Berardi	1965-02-20	259	Nord-du-Québec		49.5°N 79.1667°W
Casault	1920-10-07	155.3	La Matapédia	Bas-Saint-Laurent	48.466669444444°N 67.1°W
Casgrain	1863-12-12	160.7	Chaudière-Appalaches		46.9167°N 69.8333°W
Casson	1966-05-14	259	Abitibi-Témiscamingue		47.6667°N 77.75°W
Castagnier	1916-12-16	257.6	Abitibi-Témiscamingue		48.75°N 77.8333°W
Castelnau	1966-08-06	284.9	Laurentides		46.75°N 74.8333°W
Casupscull	1864-05-14	194.25	Causapscal	Bas-Saint-Laurent	48.3°N 67.166666666667°W
Catalogne	1940-01-27	311.61	Lac-Casault	Bas-Saint-Laurent	48.466666666667°N 66.633333333333°W
Cathcart	1857-07-18	179.68	Lanaudière		46.25°N 73.75°W
Cauchon	1920-10-16	256.57	Capitale-Nationale		47.25°N 71.25°W
Caumont		259	Nord-du-Québec		50.0833°N 78.5°W
Cavelier	1965-02-20	259	Nord-du-Québec		49.6667°N 77.9167°W
Cawood	1861-07-20	144.88	Alleyn-et-Cawood	Outaouais	45.8333°N 76.25°W
Caxton	1839-01-22	166.1	Saint-Élie-de-Caxton	Mauricie	46.516666666667°N 72.983333333333°W
Cazeneuve	1908-03-14	259	Saguenay–Lac-Saint-Jean		49.4167°N 73.6667°W
Céloron	1966-08-06	259	Nord-du-Québec		49.0833°N 78.5°W
Céry	1966-08-06	261.02	Côte-Nord		50.75°N 59.4167°W
Chabanel	1940-10-02	404.68	Lac-Ashuapmushuan	Saguenay–Lac-Saint-Jean	48.25°N 72.5°W
Chabert	1920-10-16	259	Abitibi-Témiscamingue		47.75°N 78.5833°W
Chabot	1863-02-14	274	Saint-Athanase	Bas-Saint-Laurent	47.416661111111°N 69.416661111111°W
Chalifoux	1966-05-14	220.15	Abitibi-Témiscamingue		47.5°N 77.3333°W
Chambalon	1965-02-20	248.65	Nord-du-Québec		49.25°N 74.75°W
Champagne	1966-05-14	259	Lac-Pythonga	Outaouais	46.933333333333°N 76.483333333333°W
Champdoré	1965-02-20	259	Nord-du-Québec		49.3333°N 77.6667°W
Champflour	1966-05-14	284.9	Abitibi-Témiscamingue		46.5833°N 78°W
Champigny	1908-10-03	106.05	Saguenay–Lac-Saint-Jean		48.3333°N 70.25°W
Champou	1936-01-11	199.5	Gaspésie–Îles-de-la-Madeleine		49.0833°N 65.1667°W
Champredon	1966-05-14	388.5	Abitibi-Témiscamingue		47.75°N 77.0833°W
Chapais	1910-10-16	311	Kamouraska	Bas-Saint-Laurent	47.166661111111°N 69.666661111111°W
Chapleau	1906-12-05	214.5	Mauricie; Lanaudière		46.583333333333°N 73.333333333333°W
Chapman	1965-06-05	259	Mauricie		48.4167°N 74.75°W
Charbonnel	1966-05-14	259	Outaouais		47.0833°N 76.25°W
Chardon	1936-01-11	227.85	Saguenay–Lac-Saint-Jean		48.5833°N 70.75°W
Charest	1965-12-18	292.7	Capitale-Nationale; Mauricie		47.416666666667°N 72.5°W
Charette	1966-05-14	266.75	Abitibi-Témiscamingue		48.6667°N 76.3333°W
Charland		234.7	Lanaudière		46.9167°N 74.25°W
Charlevoix	1871-04-22	126.7	Saguenay–Lac-Saint-Jean		48.4167°N 72.25°W
Charnay	1908-03-28	145.7	Côte-Nord		50.3333°N 59.9167°W
Charpeney	1965-06-05	204.6	Lac-Jérôme	Côte-Nord	50.3333°N 65.4167°W
Charron	1965-02-20	271.95	Saguenay–Lac-Saint-Jean; Nord-du-Québec		49.583333333333°N 74.166666666667°W
Chassaigne	1965-06-05	103.6	Abitibi-Témiscamingue		48.25°N 75.5°W
Chasseur	1965-12-18	292.65	Mauricie		47.75°N 72.6667°W
Chassin	1966-05-14	220.15	Abitibi-Témiscamingue		47.5°N 76.75°W
Chaste	1965-12-18	264.2	Nord-du-Québec		49.0833°N 77.8333°W
Chastelain	1965-12-18	259	Saguenay–Lac-Saint-Jean		48.75°N 71°W
Châteaufort	1908-03-14	259	Saguenay–Lac-Saint-Jean		49°N 73.9167°W
Châteauvert	1908-03-14	170.95	Mauricie		47.6667°N 73.8333°W
Chatham	1799-07-13	244.75	Brownsburg-Chatham	Laurentides	45.666666666667°N 74.433333333333°W
Chaumonot	1965-12-18	207.2	La Tuque	Mauricie	47.916666666667°N 72.833333333333°W
Chaumont	1965-05-06	259	Rivière-Mouchalagane	Côte-Nord	52.083333°N 69.166666°W
Chauveau	1919-03-22	315.65	Capitale-Nationale		47.9167°N 70.1667°W
Chauvin	1936-01-11	257	Côte-Nord		48.3333°N 69.9167°W
Chavigny	1965-02-20	113.3	Mauricie		46.9167°N 72.3333°W
Chazel	1916-12-16	263.05	Abitibi-Témiscamingue; Nord-du-Québec		48.916666666667°N 79°W
Chénier	1918-05-25	222.6	Rimouski-Neigette	Bas-Saint-Laurent	48.133330555556°N 68.616669444444°W
Cherbourg	1864-05-14	267	La Matanie Regional County Municipality	Bas-Saint-Laurent	48.883330555556°N 67.1°W
Chérisy	1908-03-14	248.65	Nord-du-Québec		50.25°N 74.9167°W
Cherrier	1966-05-14	266.75	Abitibi-Témiscamingue		48.6667°N 75.6667°W
Chertsey	1857-10-01	243.2	Laurentides; Lanaudière		46.166666666667°N 73.916666666667°W
Chesham	1869-07-24	205.6	Estrie		45.4167°N 71.0833°W
Chester	1802-07-17	261.8	Mauricie		46.0833°N 71.75°W
Chevalier	1907-01-06	210.45	Bonne-Espérance	Côte-Nord	51.5°N 57.833333333333°W
Chevré	1965-06-05	259	Côte-Nord		51.75°N 67.0833°W
Chichester	1849-03-10	214.5	Chichester	Outaouais	45.9167°N 77.0833°W
Chicoutimi	1845-10-28	163.9	Saguenay–Lac-Saint-Jean		48.3333°N 71.0833°W
Chilton	1861-11-30	250.9	Notre-Dame-de-la-Merci	Lanaudière	46.25°N 74.083333333333°W
Chomedey		259	Saguenay–Lac-Saint-Jean		49°N 72.9167°W
Chopin	1945-03-24	265.5	Lac-Douaire	Laurentides	47.083333°N 75.316666°W
Choquette	1965-06-05	259	Mauricie		47.8333°N 75.1667°W
Chouart	1965-06-05	259	Abitibi-Témiscamingue		47.9167°N 75.75°W
Chouinard	1965-12-18	253.8	Mauricie		47.75°N 73.5°W
Christie	1874-02-28	194.25	La Martre	Gaspésie–Îles-de-la-Madeleine	49.133333333333°N 66.133333333333°W
Church	1920-10-16	217.55	Cayamant	Outaouais	46.25°N 76.25°W
Cimon	1916-06-17	261.85	Lac-Ministuk	Saguenay–Lac-Saint-Jean	48.2°N 71°W
Clairy		259	Nord-du-Québec		50.6667°N 74.5833°W
Clapham	1920-10-16	180.55	Otter Lake	Outaouais	45.9167°N 76.4167°W
Clapperton	1920-10-16	271.15	Gaspésie–Îles-de-la-Madeleine		48.4167°N 66.1667°W
Clarendon	1833-01-17	286.7	Clarendon	Outaouais	45.65°N 76.516666666667°W
Clarke	1940-01-27	210.1	Lac-Casault	Bas-Saint-Laurent	48.6°N 66.133333333333°W
Claudel	1920-10-16	259	Côte-Nord		52.25°N 68.0833°W
Clément	1965-12-18	259	Côte-Nord		52.0833°N 58.25°W
Clérac	1965-12-18	259	Saguenay–Lac-Saint-Jean		50.5833°N 73°W
Cléricy	1916-12-16	254.55	Rouyn-Noranda	Abitibi-Témiscamingue	48.35°N 78.766666°W
Clérin	1965-12-18	253.8	Nord-du-Québec		50.0833°N 76.0833°W
Clérion	1920-10-16	262.95	Abitibi-Témiscamingue		47.75°N 78.75°W
Clermont	1916-12-16	258.2	Clermont (Abitibi-Ouest)	Abitibi-Témiscamingue	48.916666666667°N 79.166666666667°W
Cleveland	1855-05-30	147.65	Cleveland	Estrie	45.666666666667°N 72.083333333333°W
Clifton	1799-07-13	261.8	Martinville	Estrie	45.233333333333°N 71.633333333333°W
Clinton	1803-05-24	46.85	Piopolis	Estrie	45.416666111111°N 70.916666111111°W
Cloridorme	1871-08-04	174	Cloridorme	Gaspésie–Îles-de-la-Madeleine	49.166666666667°N 64.916666666667°W
Closse	1966-05-14	269.35	Abitibi-Témiscamingue		48.6667°N 75.9167°W
Cloutier	1965-12-18	271.95	Mauricie		47.75°N 73.25°W
Clyde	1880-04-24	192.65	La Conception	Laurentides	46.166666666667°N 74.75°W
Cognac	1966-05-14	259	Les Lacs-du-Témiscamingue	Abitibi-Témiscamingue	46.633333055556°N 78.233333055556°W
Coigny	1916-12-16	256.8	Abitibi-Témiscamingue; Nord-du-Québec		48.9167°N 77.8333°W
Colbert	1863-11-28	246.85	Capitale-Nationale		46.9167°N 72°W
Coleraine	1864-12-24	134.2	Chaudière-Appalaches		46°N 71.25°W
Collet	1940-02-10	254.95	Nord-du-Québec		49.4167°N 79.4167°W
Comporté	1965-02-20	259	Nord-du-Québec		49.6667°N 77.5°W
Compton	1802-08-31	227.35	Estrie		45.25°N 71.8333°W
Comtois	1965-02-20	207.2	Nord-du-Québec		49.0833°N 77.25°W
Conan	1965-06-05	259	Côte-Nord		51.9167°N 68.0833°W
Condé	1965-06-05	259	Saguenay–Lac-Saint-Jean		49.0833°N 72.8333°W
Constantin	1940-02-10	344	Saguenay–Lac-Saint-Jean		49.0833°N 71.4167°W
Cook	1908-01-02	611.1	Saint-Augustin, Côte-Nord, Quebec	Côte-Nord	51.166666°N 58.75°W
Coopman	1965-06-05	264.2	Côte-Nord		50.4167°N 65.3333°W
Coquart	1936-01-11	169.15	Saguenay–Lac-Saint-Jean		48.4167°N 70.0833°W
Corbeil	1965-06-05	259	Saguenay–Lac-Saint-Jean		49.6667°N 73.5°W
Corbière	1965-06-05	259	Nord-du-Québec		49.9167°N 77.6667°W
Cormier	1965-06-05	259	Côte-Nord		51.6667°N 67.0833°W
Corte-Real	1965-06-05	259	Côte-Nord		52.5°N 68.5°W
Costebelle	1965-05-06	220.15	Aguanish	Côte-Nord	50.333333°N 62.333333°W
Couillard	1936-11-01	157.45	Mont-Valin	Saguenay–Lac-Saint-Jean	48.5°N 70.166666666667°W
Courcelette	1917-10-03	238.75	Mont-Albert	Gaspésie–Îles-de-la-Madeleine	48.916666666667°N 66.35°W
Courcelle	1920-10-16	248.5	Lanaudière		46.5°N 73.6667°W
Courchesne	1965-06-05	259	Côte-Nord		52.3333°N 66.9167°W
Coursol		220.15	Mauricie		48.8333°N 75.5833°W
Courtemanche	1965-05-06	279.7	Havre-Saint-Pierre	Côte-Nord	50.3°N 63.133333333333°W
Courville	1916-12-16	259	Abitibi-Témiscamingue		48.4167°N 77.4167°W
Cousineau	1966-08-06	240.85	Lanaudière		46.4167°N 74.3333°W
Couture	1936-01-11	203.15	Saguenay–Lac-Saint-Jean		48.5°N 70.3333°W
Couturier		207.2	Abitibi-Témiscamingue		47.0833°N 78.5°W
Cox	1842-01-01	300.3	Saint-Elzéar	Gaspésie–Îles-de-la-Madeleine	48.083333333333°N 65.416666666667°W
Cramahé	1965	246.05	Saguenay–Lac-Saint-Jean		49.0833°N 73.9167°W
Cramolet	1965	259	Nord-du-Québec		49.25°N 77.5°W
Cranbourne	1834	258.6	Chaudière-Appalaches		46.3333°N 70.5833°W
Crémazie		259	Mauricie		48.5°N 75.1667°W
Crépeau	1966-08-06	254	Eeyou Istchee Baie-James	Nord-du-Québec	50.233330555556°N 75.633330555556°W
Créquy		264.25	Mauricie; Lanaudière		46.916666666667°N 73.75°W
Crespieul	1891-09-26	198.3	Saguenay–Lac-Saint-Jean		48.0833°N 72.4167°W
Crevier	1965-06-05	274.55	Saguenay–Lac-Saint-Jean		49.4167°N 72.8333°W
Crisafy	1965-02-20	186.5	Nord-du-Québec		49.25°N 74.5833°W
Croisille	1966-05-14	227.15	Outaouais		46.25°N 77.0833°W
Crusson	1965-02-20	253.8	Abitibi-Témiscamingue		48.25°N 76.5833°W
Cugnet	1965-06-05	395.85	Côte-Nord		50.3333°N 63.8333°W
Cuoq	1940-01-27	344	Rivière-Bonjour	Bas-Saint-Laurent	48.65°N 67.116669444444°W
Currie	1965-02-20	259	Nord-du-Québec		49.3333°N 76.75°W
Cuvier	1965-02-20	248.65	Nord-du-Québec		49.9167°N 74.75°W
Cuvillier	1965-02-20	233.1	Abitibi-Témiscamingue; Nord-du-Québec		48.916666666667°N 76.583333333333°W
D'Audhebourg	1965-02-20	265.05	Nord-du-Québec		51.0833°N 59°W
Daaquam	1861-11-30	171	Saint-Camille-de-Lellis	Chaudière-Appalaches	46.433330555556°N 70.15°W
Dablon	1885-02-28	167.95	Abitibi-Témiscamingue		48.25°N 72.25°W
Daillon	1966-08-06	199.45	Abitibi-Témiscamingue		46.9167°N 74.8333°W
Daine	1965-02-20	264.2	Abitibi-Témiscamingue		49.9167°N 75.5833°W
Dalet	1965-02-20	259	Eeyou Istchee Baie-James	Nord-du-Québec	49.216666666667°N 78.3°W
Dalibaire	1865-08-19	295	Les Méchins	Bas-Saint-Laurent	48.933333333333°N 66.9°W
Dalmas	1904-05-14	237.15	Saguenay–Lac-Saint-Jean		48.8333°N 71.9167°W
Dalquier	1916-12-16	259.35	Abitibi-Témiscamingue		48.6667°N 78.1667°W
Dambourgès	1965-06-05	261.6	Nord-du-Québec		50.0833°N 76.5°W
Damville	1965-06-05	259	Saguenay–Lac-Saint-Jean	49.1667°N 73°W	
Dandurand	1965-12-18	259	La Tuque	Mauricie	47.833333°N 74.55°W
Daniel	1965-02-20	259	Eeyou Istchee Baie-James	Nord-du-Québec	49.8°N 77.883333333333°W
Dansereau	1965-12-18	259	Mauricie		48.0833°N 74.1667°W
Darlens	1920-10-16	258.6	Abitibi-Témiscamingue		47.9167°N 78.5833°W
Darveau	1920-10-16	259	Les Lacs-du-Témiscamingue	Abitibi-Témiscamingue	47.2°N 78.433333055556°W
Dasserat	1916-12-16	258	Abitibi-Témiscamingue		48.25°N 79.4167°W
Daubrée	1965-02-20	248.65	Nord-du-Québec		49.8333°N 75°W
Dauphiné	1966-05-14	227.9	Outaouais		46.6667°N 76.9167°W
David	1965-05-06	259	La Tuque	Mauricie	47.833333333333°N 74.983333333333°W
Davost	1965-06-05	259	Nord-du-Québec		49.9167°N 76.0833°W
De Beaujeu	1866-12-01	267.15	Gaspésie–Îles-de-la-Madeleine		49°N 64.9167°W
De Calonne	1872-07-20	161.9	Mauricie		46.5°N 73.25°W
De Cazes		259	Saguenay–Lac-Saint-Jean		48.8333°N 73.6667°W
De Combles	1965-06-05	256.4	Nord-du-Québec		50.083333333333°N 77°W
De l'Île	1868	190.2	Saguenay–Lac-Saint-Jean		48.6667°N 71.75°W
De Lamarre	1965	277.15	Nord-du-Québec		48.75°N 72.833333333333°W
De Lino	1965-06-05	259	Côte-Nord		52.0833°N 68.75°W
De Maisonneuve	1880-10-23	287.35	Lac-Matawin	Lanaudière	46.833333333333°N 74°W
De Meulles	1864-06-04	135.15	Saguenay–Lac-Saint-Jean		48.6667°N 72.5833°W
De Monts	1867-07-06	364.2	Côte-Nord		49.4167°N 67.5°W
De Nouë	1912-03-30	109.25	Gaspésie–Îles-de-la-Madeleine		49.1667°N 65.25°W
De Quen	1879-03-15	186.15	Saguenay–Lac-Saint-Jean		48.25°N 72.0833°W
De Salaberry	1859-02-05	124.3	Laurentides		46.0833°N 74.5833°W
De Sales	1868-05-23	165.95	Saint-Aimé-des-Lacs	Capitale-Nationale	47.683333333333°N 70.4°W
Décarie	1965-02-20	291.4	Laurentides		46.8333°N 75.3333°W
Decelles	1965-06-05	259	Mauricie		48.0833°N 74.3333°W
Dechêne	1913-09-06	149.75	Saguenay–Lac-Saint-Jean		48.3333°N 72.3333°W
Delâge	1965-06-05	259	Mauricie		48.25°N 74.5833°W
Delbreuil	1920-10-16	214.45	Abitibi-Témiscamingue		47.6667°N 78.5°W
Delestres	1916-12-16	196.5	Abitibi-Témiscamingue		48.6667°N 77°W
Demers	1873-06-12	170	Rivière-du-Loup Regional County Municipality	Bas-Saint-Laurent	47.75°N 69.083338888889°W
Denain	1965-02-20	256.4	Abitibi-Témiscamingue		47.9167°N 77°W
Denaut	1965-06-05	259	Saguenay–Lac-Saint-Jean		49.25°N 73.6667°W
Denholm	1869-03-20	189	Denholm	Outaouais	45.8333°N 75.8333°W
Denonville	1861-07-20	125	Rivière-du-Loup Regional County Municipality	Bas-Saint-Laurent	47.95°N 69.166661111111°W
Denys	1965-05-06	259	Rivière-Mistassini	Saguenay–Lac-Saint-Jean	49.85°N 73.45°W
Derry	1865-07-15	143.25	Mulgrave-et-Derry	Outaouais	45.75°N 75.5°W
Des Groseilliers	1965-05-06	259	Rivière-Mouchalagane	Côte-Nord	52.333333°N 68.75°W
Des Hayes	1965-06-05	248.65	Côte-Nord		49.3333°N 69.25°W
Des Herbiers	1965-06-05	220.15	Côte-Nord		50.3333°N 62.9167°W
Des Landes	1936-01-11	207.2	Gaspésie–Îles-de-la-Madeleine		48.9167°N 65.8333°W
Des Méloizes	1916-12-16	257.8	Abitibi-Témiscamingue		48.9167°N 79.4167°W
Des Musseaux	1965-06-05	259	Abitibi-Témiscamingue		47.3333°N 78.5°W
Desandrouins	1920-10-16	261.25	Abitibi-Témiscamingue		47.9167°N 79.1667°W
Desaulniers	1906-05-12	283.3	Mauricie		46.75°N 73.1667°W
Desautels	1965-06-05	259	Saguenay–Lac-Saint-Jean		49.4167°N 73.25°W
Desboues	1916-12-16	257	Abitibi-Témiscamingue; Nord-du-Québec		48.916666666667°N 78.333333333333°W
Deschambault	1965-06-05	259	Côte-Nord		52.5°N 69°W
Deschamps	1966-05-14	101	Abitibi-Témiscamingue		48.6667°N 75.5833°W
Desgly	1965-06-05	259	Saguenay–Lac-Saint-Jean		49.25°N 73.5°W
Desjardins	1965-02-20	259	Nord-du-Québec		49.5°N 77°W
Desjordy	1965-06-05	259	Côte-Nord		52.5°N 66.9167°W
Desmazures	1965-02-20	259	Eeyou Istchee Baie-James	Nord-du-Québec	49.666666111111°N 78.083333055556°W
Despinassy	1916-12-16	234.55	Abitibi-Témiscamingue		48.75°N 77.4167°W
Desportes	1965-06-05	259	Côte-Nord		52.0833°N 66.5833°W
Desranleau	1965-06-05	284.9	Abitibi-Témiscamingue		47.3333°N 78°W
Desrivières	1965-06-05	261.6	Saguenay–Lac-Saint-Jean		49.4167°N 71.6667°W
Desroberts	1920-10-16	258.9	Abitibi-Témiscamingue		47.9167°N 78.0833°W
Desruisseaux	1965-06-05	259	Côte-Nord		51.6667°N 69.4167°W
Dessane	1965-12-18	256.4	Mauricie		47.8333°N 73.9167°W
Destor	1916-12-16	259.4	Abitibi-Témiscamingue		48.5°N 79°W
Deville	1936-01-11	303.5	Gaspésie–Îles-de-la-Madeleine		48.75°N 65.8333°W
Devine	1966-05-14	181.3	Lac-Pythonga	Outaouais	47.5°N 76.5°W
Devlin	1909-10-02	279.7	Abitibi-Témiscamingue		47.5°N 78.6667°W
Déziel	1965-02-20	259	Mauricie		48.5833°N 74.3333°W
Diaz	1965-05-06	259	Senneterre (ville)	Abitibi-Témiscamingue	48.066666666667°N 75.933333333333°W
Didace	1966-05-14	220.15	Abitibi-Témiscamingue		47.5°N 76.9167°W
Dieppe	1966-02-20	248.65	Nord-du-Québec		49.5°N 79.4167°W
Diéreville	1965-06-05	349.65	Abitibi-Témiscamingue		46.9167°N 78°W
Dieskau	1966-05-14	259	Réservoir-Dozois	Abitibi-Témiscamingue	47.366666666667°N 76.683333333333°W
Dion	1965-06-05	259	Côte-Nord		51.75°N 69.6667°W
Dionne	1863-12-12	158.65	Chaudière-Appalaches		47°N 69.75°W
Disson	1916-12-16	258.2	Abitibi-Témiscamingue; Nord-du-Québec		48.916666666667°N 78.75°W
Ditchfield	1869-10-20	177.25	Lac-Mégantic	Estrie	45.5°N 70.833333°W
Ditton	1803-05-13	259	Estrie		45.4167°N 71.25°W
Dolbeau	1904-06-04	242.8	Saguenay–Lac-Saint-Jean		48.9167°N 72.0833°W
Dollard	1916-12-16	259	Abitibi-Témiscamingue		48.3333°N 77°W
Dollier	1965-02-20	165.75	Saguenay–Lac-Saint-Jean; Nord-du-Québec		49.666666666667°N 74.166666666667°W
Dolomieu	1965-02-20	248.65	Nord-du-Québec		49.8333°N 75.25°W
Doncaster	1858-01-05	266.7	Sainte-Lucie-des-Laurentides	Laurentides	46.15°N 74.183333333333°W
Dontenwill	1966-05-14	217.55	Lac-Nilgaut	Outaouais	46.333333°N 77.5°W
Doreil	1965-02-20	240.85	Nord-du-Québec		50.0833°N 75.8333°W
Dorion	1920-10-16	191.4	Outaouais		46.0833°N 76.25°W
Dorset	1799-12-30	287.45	Chaudière-Appalaches, Estrie		45.833333333333°N 70.833333333333°W
Dorval	1965-02-20	235.7	Nord-du-Québec		50.75°N 73.6667°W
Dosquet	1965-06-05	259	Saguenay–Lac-Saint-Jean		49.25°N 72.8333°W
Douay	1965-02-20	259	Nord-du-Québec		49.5°N 78.1667°W
Douglas	1842-01-01	271.15	Gaspé	Gaspésie–Îles-de-la-Madeleine	48.716666666667°N 64.4°W
Doussin	1965-02-20	233.1	Abitibi-Témiscamingue		48.6667°N 76.5833°W
Doutreleau	1966-05-14	248.65	Outaouais		46.9167°N 77.0833°W
Douville	1965-06-05	259	Mauricie		48°N 75.4167°W
Drapeau	1965-05-06	222.75	Lac-Ashuapmushuan	Saguenay–Lac-Saint-Jean	48.6°N 72.7°W
Drouet	1965-02-20	248.65	Nord-du-Québec		49.5833°N 75.25°W
Drouin	1965-12-18	111.35	Mauricie		47.75°N 74.4167°W
Drucourt	1965-06-05	233.1	Côte-Nord		50.3333°N 62.5°W
Druillettes	1965-02-20	248.65	Nord-du-Québec		49.5833°N 75°W
Du Creux	1920-10-16	134.7	Saguenay–Lac-Saint-Jean		48.0833°N 70.25°W
Du Guesclin	1965-02-20	248.65	Nord-du-Québec		49.4167°N 75.4167°W
Du Plessis	1965-02-20	259	Nord-du-Québec		49.3333°N 76.5°W
Du Tast	1965-06-05	233.1	Nord-du-Québec		50.0833°N 78.3333°W
Du Thet	1965-06-05	259	Côte-Nord		49.3333°N 69.6667°W
Du Tremblay	1966-05-14	292.65	Outaouais, Abitibi-Témiscamingue		46.666666666667°N 77.75°W
Duberger	1965-05-06	259	Saguenay–Lac-Saint-Jean, Nord-du-Québec		50.166666666667°N 73.666666666667°W
Dubois	1965-05-06	259	Saguenay–Lac-Saint-Jean, Mauricie		48.833333333333°N 74.333333333333°W
Dubuc	1920-10-16	207.2	Saguenay–Lac-Saint-Jean		48.0833°N 71°W
Dubuisson	1920-10-16	259	Val-d'Or	Abitibi-Témiscamingue	48.0833°N 77.8333°W
Ducharme	1965-02-20	261.6	Saguenay–Lac-Saint-Jean		49.4167°N 74.1667°W
Duchesnay	1875-05-29	271.15	Gaspésie–Îles-de-la-Madeleine		49.1667°N 65.9167°W
Duchesne	1965-05-06	259	Eeyou Istchee Baie-James	Nord-du-Québec	49.95°N 76.983333333333°W
Duchesneau	1908-10-17	186.15	Côte-Nord		50.3333°N 60.5°W
Ducros	1916-12-16	316.8	Abitibi-Témiscamingue		48.6667°N 77.1667°W
Dudley	1892-11-05	174	Laurentides		46.25°N 75.5833°W
Dudouyt	1966-05-14	259	Réservoir-Dozois	Abitibi-Témiscamingue	47.333333°N 77.5°W
Dudswell	1805-05-13	215.5	Estrie		45.5833°N 71.6667°W
Dufay	1920-10-16	259	Rouyn-Noranda	Abitibi-Témiscamingue	48.083333333333°N 79.416666666667°W
Dufferin	1916-06-24	141.65	Saguenay–Lac-Saint-Jean		48.75°N 72.6667°W
Dufour	1940-01-27	208.4	Rivière-Bonaventure	Gaspésie–Îles-de-la-Madeleine	48.5°N 65.75°W
Dufresne	1965-05-06	259	Rivière-Mistassini	Saguenay–Lac-Saint-Jean	49.416666666667°N 73°W
Dufresnoy	1916-12-16	259	Abitibi-Témiscamingue		48.3333°N 79°W
Dugal	1940-01-27	238.35	Gaspésie–Îles-de-la-Madeleine		48.25°N 66.4167°W
Dugas	1965-06-05	259	Côte-Nord		52.3333°N 66.5833°W
Duhamel	1965-05-06	259	Duhamel-Ouest	Abitibi-Témiscamingue	47.333333333333°N 79.416666666667°W
Dulhut	1966-05-14	191.65	Outaouais		46.25°N 77.3333°W
Dumais	1917-01-27	161.85	Saguenay–Lac-Saint-Jean		48.9167°N 72.8333°W
Dumas	1877-09-15	311.6	Petit-Saguenay	Saguenay–Lac-Saint-Jean	48.15°N 70.016666666667°W
Dumoulin	1965-12-18	227.9	Mauricie		47.5°N 73°W
Dundee	1831-03-31	94	Akwesasne 15		45°N 74.5°W
Dunham	1796-02-02	232.7	Montérégie		45.0833°N 72.8333°W
Dunière	1921-05-07	364.2	La Matapédia	Bas-Saint-Laurent	48.666661111111°N 66.5°W
Duparquet	1916-12-16	257.7	Abitibi-Témiscamingue		48.5°N 79.1667°W
Dupont		259	Lanaudière		47°N 74.4167°W
Duprat	1916-12-16	250.9	Abitibi-Témiscamingue		48.3333°N 79.1667°W
Dupré	1965	259	Saguenay–Lac-Saint-Jean		50°N 72.8333°W
Dupuis	1965-12-18	326.35	Mauricie		47.3333°N 73.75°W
Duquesne	1881-06-18	214	Rimouski-Neigette	Bas-Saint-Laurent	48.25°N 68.533330555556°W
Duquet	1965-02-20	246.05	Nord-du-Québec		50.4167°N 73.9167°W
Durham	1796-02-02	232.7	Durham-Sud	Centre-du-Québec	45.666666666667°N 72.25°W
Durocher	1881-02-12	153.8	Saguenay–Lac-Saint-Jean		48.4167°N 70.4167°W
Dussieux	1965-02-20	259	Nord-du-Québec		49.8333°N 77°W
Duval	1869-03-20	145.7	Côte-Nord		50.0833°N 61.6667°W
Duverny	1916-12-16	257.1	Abitibi-Témiscamingue		48.6667°N 77.8333°W
Eardley	1806-07-22	184.15	Pontiac	Outaouais	45.5833°N 76°W
Eaton	1800-04-12	269.85	Cookshire-Eaton	Estrie	45.383333333333°N 71.65°W
Eddy	1908-02-01	341.5	Abitibi-Témiscamingue		46.3333°N 78.1667°W
Edwards	1908-02-22	352.1	Les Lacs-du-Témiscamingue	Abitibi-Témiscamingue	46.366666666667°N 78.483333333333°W
Effiat	1965-02-20	279.7	Nord-du-Québec		49.0833°N 76.0833°W
Egan	1864-08-20	306.55	Outaouais		46.5°N 76.0833°W
Elgin	1849-05-30	123	Elgin	Montérégie	45.016669444444°N 74.233330555556°W
Ely	1802-11-13	254.95	Estrie, Montérégie		45.583333333333°N 72.333333333333°W
Émard	1966-05-14	259	Outaouais		47.25°N 76.75°W
Emberton	1870-08-13	74.45	Estrie		45.25°N 71.25°W
Enjalran	1965-02-20	251.25	Nord-du-Québec		49.8333°N 79.4167°W
Entremont	1966-05-14	259	Abitibi-Témiscamingue		47.6667°N 77.0833°W
Escoumins	1860-08-12	261.05	Les Escoumins	Côte-Nord	48.416666°N 69.416666°W
Esgriseilles	1966-05-14	253.8	Outaouais		46.9167°N 77.3333°W
Esher	1902-03-15	194.1	Sheenboro	Outaouais	46.0833°N 77.3333°W
Esmanville	1965-06-05	259	Côte-Nord		52.5°N 67.0833°W
Esperey	1965-06-05	259	Abitibi-Témiscamingue		48.0833°N 76.1667°W
Estcourt	1866-09-01	188	Rivière-Bleue	Bas-Saint-Laurent	47.5°N 69.166661111111°W
Estimauville		284.9	Abitibi-Témiscamingue		47.5°N 78°W
Estrades	1965-02-20	259	Nord-du-Québec		49.5°N 78.75°W
Estrées	1965-02-20	259	Eeyou Istchee Baie-James	Nord-du-Québec	49.516666666667°N 78.983333333333°W
Eudes	1924-08-02	176.85	Côte-Nord		49.25°N 68.5°W
Évanturel		259	Mauricie		48.416666666667°N 75.25°W
Faber	1965-05-06	259	Rivière-Mouchalagane	Côte-Nord	52.5°N 67.566666666667°W
Fabre	1965-02-20	238.75	Abitibi-Témiscamingue		47.1667°N 79.3333°W
Fafard	1965-02-20	364.2	Côte-Nord		49.5833°N 67.5833°W
Fagundez	1965-05-06	264.2	Rivière-Mouchalagane	Côte-Nord	51.75°N 67.833333055556°W
Faguy	1965-02-20	259	Mauricie		48.5°N 74.1667°W
Faillon	1965-02-20	253.8	Senneterre (ville)	Abitibi-Témiscamingue	48.366666°N 76.583333°W
Falaise	1965-05-06	259	Rivière-Mouchalagane	Côte-Nord	52.083333333333°N 66.916666666667°W
Falardeau	1965-02-20	310.8	Saguenay–Lac-Saint-Jean		48.6667°N 71.1667°W
Fancamp	1965-02-20	183.9	Nord-du-Québec		49.5833°N 74.5833°W
Faraud	1965-06-05	238.3	Passes-Dangereuses	Saguenay–Lac-Saint-Jean	49.333333°N 71.333333°W
Faribault	1940-01-27	182	La Matanie Regional County Municipality	Bas-Saint-Laurent	48.866661111111°N 66.533330555556°W
Farnham	1965-02-20	248.9	Montérégie		45.25°N 72.8333°W
Faucher	1965-05-06	259	La Tuque	Mauricie	48.116666666667°N 75.2°W
Fauvel	1965-02-20	297.85	Gaspésie–Îles-de-la-Madeleine		48.25°N 66.75°W
Fénelon	1965-02-20	259	Nord-du-Québec		49.9167°N 78.5833°W
Ferland	1916-08-12	248.9	Saguenay–Lac-Saint-Jean		48.1667°N 70.8333°W
Festubert	1965-06-05	259	Abitibi-Témiscamingue		47.9167°N 75.9167°W
Feuquières	1965-02-20	248.65	Saguenay–Lac-Saint-Jean; Nord-du-Québec		49.083333333333°N 74.333333333333°W
Fiedmont	1916-12-16	256.35	Abitibi-Témiscamingue		48.3333°N 77.6667°W
Figuery	1916-12-16	269.55	Abitibi-Témiscamingue		48.5°N 78.1667°W
Fitzpatrick	1903-03-20	259	Côte-Nord		49.75°N 67.25°W
Flahault	1885-08-22	216.5	Gaspésie–Îles-de-la-Madeleine		48.3333°N 65.8333°W
Flandre	1966-05-14	277.15	Lac-Nilgaut	Outaouais	46.483333°N 76.683333°W
Fléché	1903-03-20	181.8	Côte-Nord		50.25°N 66.75°W
Fletcher	1936-01-11	329.4	Gaspésie–Îles-de-la-Madeleine		48.9167°N 65.1667°W
Fleuriau	1865-04-08	130.7	Bas-Saint-Laurent		48.4167°N 68.1667°W
Fleuricourt	1965-06-05	259	Saguenay–Lac-Saint-Jean		50.25°N 73°W
Flynn	1965-05-06	259	Lac-Huron	Bas-Saint-Laurent	48.216666666667°N 68.266666666667°W
Foch	1965-02-20	292.7	Abitibi-Témiscamingue		48.0833°N 76.5833°W
Foligny	1966-05-14	194.25	Abitibi-Témiscamingue		47.6667°N 76.75°W
Fontbrune	1966-08-06	312.6	Laurentides		46.8333°N 75.6667°W
Fonteneau	1965-02-20	259	Nord-du-Québec		49.0833°N 77.6667°W
Forant	1966-05-14	233.1	Outaouais		46.3333°N 77.0833°W
Forbes	1966-06-08	178.7	Lac-Legendre	Lanaudière	46.533333333333°N 74.266666666667°W
Forget	1965-06-05	259	Côte-Nord		52.0833°N 69.4167°W
Forgues	1965-06-05	259	Côte-Nord		51.6667°N 67.5833°W
Fornel	1965-06-05	194.25	Côte-Nord		50.3333°N 64.5°W
Forsyth	1849-06-30	143.65	Chaudière-Appalaches; Estrie		45.916666666667°N 71°W
Fortier	1965-06-05	259	Mauricie		48°N 75.1667°W
Fortin	1920-10-16	220.15	Gaspésie–Îles-de-la-Madeleine		48.5833°N 64.5833°W
Fournier	1861-06-01	176.85	Chaudière-Appalaches		47.0833°N 70.0833°W
Fournière	1920-10-16	266.7	Abitibi-Témiscamingue		48.0833°N 78.0833°W
Fox	1842-01-01	171.6	Gaspé	Gaspésie–Îles-de-la-Madeleine	48.966388°N 64.45°W
Frampton	1806-07-10	269.1	Chaudière-Appalaches		46.4167°N 70.75°W
Franchère	1945-03-17	297.85	Laurentides		46.9167°N 75°W
Francheville	1965-05-06	259	Rivière-Mouchalagane	Côte-Nord	52.65°N 67.8°W
Franklin	1857-05-27	77.7	Franklin	Montérégie	45.033333°N 73.916666°W
Franquelin	1945-03-17	339.95	Côte-Nord		49.4167°N 67.75°W
Franquet	1945-03-17	305.6	Nord-du-Québec		49.25°N 77°W
Fraser	1945-03-17	225.3	Nord-du-Québec		49.25°N 77.25°W
Fréchette	1920-10-16	259	Mauricie		48.0833°N 74.5833°W
Frémont	1965-12-18	334.1	Mauricie		47.5833°N 73.75°W
French	1966-06-08	199.45	Lac-de-la-Maison-de-Pierre	Laurentides	46.833333°N 74.666666°W
Fréville	1920-10-16	263.85	Abitibi-Témiscamingue		47.75°N 77.25°W
Frigon	1965-06-05	259	Côte-Nord		52.1667°N 69.25°W
Froidevaux	1966-06-08	269.35	Laurentides, Outaouais		47.083333333333°N 76.083333333333°W
Gaboury	1919-12-20	186.15	Abitibi-Témiscamingue		47.3333°N 79°W
Gagné	1936-01-11	169.95	Saguenay–Lac-Saint-Jean		48.6667°N 70.9167°W
Gagnon	1894-07-28	176.05	Laurentides, Outaouais		46.166666666667°N 75.083333333333°W
Gaillard	1966-05-14	259	Outaouais		47.25°N 76.9167°W
Galifet	1965-12-18	323.75	Mauricie, Lanaudière		47.25°N 73.916666666667°W
Galinée	1965-02-20	259	Nord-du-Québec		49.6667°N 77.6667°W
Galt	1866-10-27	132.55	Gaspésie–Îles-de-la-Madeleine		48.9167°N 64.75°W
Gamache	1965-02-20	181.3	Nord-du-Québec		49.4167°N 74.5833°W
Gamelin	1966-08-06	181.3	Lanaudière		46.5°N 74°W
Gand	1965-02-20	248.65	Eeyou Istchee Baie-James	Nord-du-Québec	49.666666°N 75.866666°W
Garakonthié		259	Abitibi-Témiscamingue		47.5°N 78.25°W
Garin	1940-01-27	202.75	Gaspésie–Îles-de-la-Madeleine		48.25°N 65.4167°W
Garneau	1863-01-17	163.5	Chaudière-Appalaches		47°N 70°W
Garnier	1916-12-09	89.05	Saguenay–Lac-Saint-Jean		48.75°N 71.6667°W
Garreau	1965-06-05	259	Saguenay–Lac-Saint-Jean		48.75°N 70.8333°W
Garthby	1855-02-06	186.15	Chaudière-Appalaches; Mauricie		45.916666666667°N 71.416666666667°W
Gascogne	1966-05-14	274.55	Outaouais		46.5°N 76.9167°W
Gastonguay	1936-11-01	246.05	Rivière-Saint-Jean	Gaspésie–Îles-de-la-Madeleine	48.75°N 65.416666°W
Gaudet		259	Nord-du-Québec		49.9167°N 78.75°W
Gaulin		207.2	Abitibi-Témiscamingue		47.0833°N 78.25°W
Gauthier	1920-10-16	104.1	Lanaudière		46.4167°N 73.5°W
Gauvin	1965-02-20	243.45	Saguenay–Lac-Saint-Jean, Nord-du-Québec		50.25°N 73.666666666667°W
Gay	1920-10-16	227.9	Lac-Marguerite	Laurentides	47.066666°N 75.833333°W
Gayhurst	1868-05-23	167.55	Estrie		45.75°N 70.8333°W
Gendreau	1890-10-25	249.9	Abitibi-Témiscamingue		46.6667°N 79°W
Gendron	1904-11-06	267.1	Lac-Édouard	Mauricie	47.733333°N 72.333333°W
Geoffrion	1965-12-18	323.75	Mauricie		47.25°N 73.25°W
Gervaise	1965-06-05	259	Côte-Nord		52.3333°N 69°W
Gillies	1903-10-12	231.8	Lac-Nilgaut	Outaouais	46.233333333333°N 76.733333333333°W
Girard	1909-01-30	242.8	Saint-Thomas-Didyme	Saguenay–Lac-Saint-Jean	48.966666666667°N 72.616666666667°W
Girouard	1966-05-14	259	Abitibi-Témiscamingue		48.5°N 76.3333°W
Giroux	1966-05-14	284.9	Abitibi-Témiscamingue		46.75°N 78°W
Glandelet	1965-02-20	259	Nord-du-Québec		49.0833°N 78.0833°W
Gloria	1966-06-08	253.8	Eeyou Istchee Baie-James	Nord-du-Québec	50.416666666667°N 75.833333333333°W
Godbout	1919-09-27	809.35	Côte-Nord		49.5833°N 67.8333°W
Godefroy	1965-06-05	259	Côte-Nord		51.75°N 68.0833°W
Godmanchester	1811-05-10	293.8	Montérégie		45.0833°N 74.3333°W
Gomez	1965-06-05	259	Rivière-Mouchalagane	Côte-Nord	52.5°N 68.25°W
Gonthier	1966-05-14	253.8	Outaouais, Abitibi-Témiscamingue		47.166666666667°N 77.75°W
Gore	1840-10-19	95.75	Gore	Laurentides	45.766666°N 74.25°W
Gosford	1868-06-10	218.75	Capitale-Nationale		47°N 71.75°W
Gosselin	1965-06-05	259	Mauricie		47.8333°N 75.4167°W
Gouin	1903-08-01	193.45	Lanaudière		46.5833°N 74.0833°W
Goupil	1966-05-14	380.75	Les Lacs-du-Témiscamingue	Abitibi-Témiscamingue	46.45°N 78°W
Gradis	1965-02-20	248.65	Nord-du-Québec		49.4167°N 75.25°W
Granby	1803-01-08	217.55	Montérégie		45.3333°N 72.75°W
Grand-Calumet	1847-05-14	122.6	L'Île-du-Grand-Calumet	Outaouais	45.733333°N 76.683333°W
Grandfontaine	1965-06-05	253.8	Eeyou Istchee Baie-James	Nord-du-Québec	50.083333333333°N 76.75°W
Grandin	1965-06-05	259	Côte-Nord		51.6667°N 69.6667°W
Grandison	1885-10-31	125.45	Mont-Tremblant	Laurentides	46.216666666667°N 74.566666666667°W
Granet	1920-10-16	265.15	Abitibi-Témiscamingue		47.75°N 77.5°W
Grantham	1800-05-14	317	Mauricie; Montérégie		45.833333333333°N 72.583333333333°W
Grasset	1965-06-05	259	Nord-du-Québec		49.9167°N 78.0833°W
Gravel	1899-06-24	176.05	Laurentides		46.75°N 75.4167°W
Gravier	1940-01-07	336	La Matapédia	Bas-Saint-Laurent	48.533330555556°N 66.333338888889°W
Grenier	1906-03-17	172	Port-Cartier	Côte-Nord	49.95°N 67.033333333333°W
Grenville	1808-01-28	231.05	Laurentides		45.75°N 74.6667°W
Grevet	1965-02-20	259	Eeyou Istchee Baie-James	Nord-du-Québec	49.25°N 76.75°W
Guay	1940-01-27	227.9	Abitibi-Témiscamingue		47.1667°N 79°W
Guéguen	1940-01-27	204.6	Gaspésie–Îles-de-la-Madeleine		48.4167°N 65.3333°W
Guercheville	1965-02-20	246.05	Nord-du-Québec		49.5833°N 75.4167°W
Guérin	1940-01-27	258.75	Abitibi-Témiscamingue		47.6667°N 79.25°W
Gueslis	1965-06-05	259	Côte-Nord		52.5°N 67.3333°W
Guettard	1965-02-20	173.55	Nord-du-Québec		49.9167°N 75.4167°W
Guigues	1881-07-16	301.85	Abitibi-Témiscamingue		47.5°N 79.4167°W
Guillet	1936-01-11	299.45	Abitibi-Témiscamingue		47.3333°N 78.6667°W
Guillimin	1965-06-05	259	Côte-Nord		52.25°N 66.9167°W
Guy	1965-06-05	142.45	Les Lacs-du-Témiscamingue	Abitibi-Témiscamingue	47.633333333333°N 78.383333333333°W
Guyart	1965-06-05	259	Saguenay–Lac-Saint-Jean		49.5833°N 73.5°W
Guyenne	1916-12-16	259	Abitibi-Témiscamingue		48.75°N 78.5°W
Guyon	1965-02-20	303.05	Nord-du-Québec		50.5833°N 73.6667°W
Hachin	1965-06-05	266.75	Rivière-Mouchalagane	Côte-Nord	51.666666°N 69.916666°W
Hackett	1899-06-02	258	Lac-Masketsi	Mauricie	47.083333333333°N 72.566666666667°W
Haig	1965-02-20	259	Senneterre (ville)	Abitibi-Témiscamingue	48.083333333333°N 76.833333333333°W
Hainaut	1966-05-14	256.4	Lac-Pythonga	Outaouais	46.783333055556°N 76.683333055556°W
Halifax	1802-08-07	253.4	Chaudière-Appalaches; Mauricie		46.083333°N 71.666666°W
Hallé	1936-01-11	259	Abitibi-Témiscamingue		47.5°N 78.5°W
Ham-Nord	1807-07-29	261.75	Ham-Nord	Centre-du-Québec	45.833333333333°N 71.666666666667°W
Ham-Sud	1851-11-22	101.15	Ham-Sud	Estrie	45.75°N 71.583333°W
Hamel	1965-12-18	212.4	Abitibi-Témiscamingue		47.9167°N 73.9167°W
Hamilton	1842-01-01	315	Saint-Siméon (Bonaventure)	Gaspésie–Îles-de-la-Madeleine	48.166666°N 65.583333°W
Hamon	1966-05-14	220.15	Mauricie		47.5°N 77.5°W
Hampden	1867-06-15	141.65	Mauricie		45.5°N 71.25°W
Hanotaux	1936-01-11	246.05	La Tuque	Mauricie	48.55°N 75.416666°W
Harlay	1965-06-05	261.6	Saguenay–Lac-Saint-Jean		50.1667°N 73.5°W
Harper	1965-12-18	220.15	Mauricie		47.4167°N 73.0833°W
Harrington	1841-03-06	217.65	Laurentides		45.8333°N 74.6667°W
Harris	1966-05-14	251.25	Lac-Pythonga	Outaouais	47.216666666667°N 76.266666666667°W
Hartwell	1864-01-16	188.2	Outaouais		45.9167°N 75.0833°W
Harvey	1848-09-23	157.85	Saint-Fulgence	Saguenay–Lac-Saint-Jean	48.483333333333°N 70.783333333333°W
Hatley	1803-03-25	212.3	Hatley	Estrie	45.1667°N 72.0833°W
Hauteville	1965-06-05	259	Côte-Nord		52.6667°N 67.5833°W
Haüy	1965-02-20	116.55	Nord-du-Québec		49.6667°N 74.5833°W
Havelock	1858-07-24	87.05	Montérégie		45.05°N 73.75°W
Hazeur	1965-06-05	248.65	Nord-du-Québec		49.4167°N 74.8333°W
Hébécourt	1965-02-20	259	Abitibi-Témiscamingue		48.5°N 79.4167°W
Hébert	1965-02-20	254.15	Saguenay–Lac-Saint-Jean		48.25°N 70.4167°W
Hemmingford	1799-03-18	237	Les Jardins-de-Napierville Regional County Municipality	Montérégie	45.083330555556°N 73.583338888889°W
Hémon	1965-02-20	149.35	Saguenay–Lac-Saint-Jean		49.1667°N 72.5°W
Hereford	1965-06-05	261.75	Estrie		45.0833°N 71.5833°W
Hériot	1965-02-20	259	Saguenay–Lac-Saint-Jean		49.8333°N 72.8333°W
Hertel	1965-06-05	259	Saguenay–Lac-Saint-Jean		50°N 73.25°W
Hervieux	1965-06-05	259	Côte-Nord		51.75°N 68.5°W
Hesry	1965-06-05	259	Côte-Nord		51.9167°N 67.8333°W
Hiché	1965-06-05	259	Côte-Nord		52.0833°N 69°W
Hinchinbrooke	1799-01-23	80.95	Hinchinbrooke	Montérégie	45.05°N 74.1°W
Hincks	1864-10-29	250.4	Outaouais		45.9167°N 75.8333°W
Hind	1965-06-05	259	Rivière-Mouchalagane	Côte-Nord	52.216666°N 67.333333°W
Hocquart	1920-02-28	83.3	Bas-Saint-Laurent		47.8333°N 69.0833°W
Holland	1936-11-01	298	Collines-du-Basque	Gaspésie–Îles-de-la-Madeleine	48.916666°N 65.416666°W
Holmes	1916-12-16	259	Abitibi-Témiscamingue; Nord-du-Québec		48.933333333333°N 76.783333333333°W
Honorat	1940-01-27	261.25	Gaspésie–Îles-de-la-Madeleine		48.25°N 65.25°W
Hope	1920-10-16	267.1	Shigawake	Gaspésie–Îles-de-la-Madeleine	48.166666666667°N 65.166666666667°W
Horan	1966-05-14	264.2	Outaouais		47.0833°N 77.3333°W
Horton	1840-08-07	80.1	Mauricie		46.0833°N 72.25°W
Houde	1965-12-18	194.25	Lanaudière		46.6667°N 73.5833°W
Houdet	1966-05-14	264.2	Lac-Nilgaut	Outaouais	47.066666°N 77.116666°W
Howard	1873-11-22	147.5	Saint-Adolphe-d'Howard	Laurentides	46°N 74.333333333333°W
Huard		261.6	Saguenay–Lac-Saint-Jean; Mauricie		48.833333333333°N 74.166666666667°W
Hubert	1965-06-05	225.35	Saguenay–Lac-Saint-Jean		49.25°N 72.5833°W
Huddersfield		155.05	Otter Lake	Outaouais	45.9167°N 76.5833°W
Hudon	1936-01-11	231.9	Saguenay–Lac-Saint-Jean		49.0833°N 72°W
Huguenin	1965-06-05	259	Mauricie		48.25°N 74.75°W
Hull	1806-01-03	369.05	Chelsea, Hull	Outaouais	45.5°N 75.833333333333°W
Humqui	1870-06-18	180	La Matapédia	Bas-Saint-Laurent	48.383330555556°N 67.383330555556°W
Hunterstown	1800-04-29	145.7	Mauricie		46.4167°N 73.0833°W
Huot	1965-12-18	259	Mauricie		48°N 74.1667°W
Hurault	1916-12-16	259	Abitibi-Témiscamingue, Nord-du-Québec		48.916666666667°N 77.416666666667°W
Iberville	1860-12-01	204.75	Côte-Nord		48.5833°N 69.3333°W
Île-aux-Allumettes	1858-01-30	170.3	L'Isle-aux-Allumettes	Outaouais	45.8333°N 77°W
Ingall	1965-12-18	275.2	Mauricie		47.9167°N 73.25°W
Inverness	1802-09-08	284.9	Chaudière-Appalaches, Mauricie		46.25°N 71.583333333333°W
Irlande	1802-08-20	262.1	Irlande	Chaudière-Appalaches	46.083333°N 71.416666°W
Isle-de-France	1966-05-14	277.15	Outaouais		46.5°N 76.5°W
Isle-Dieu	1965-02-20	259	Nord-du-Québec		49.8333°N 77.6667°W
Ixworth	1802-11-22	262.5	Bas-Saint-Laurent		47.3333°N 69.8333°W
Jalobert	1965	259	Abitibi-Témiscamingue		48.0833°N 75.75°W
Jamet	1966-06-08	218.55	Outaouais, Lanaudière		46.5°N 74.5°W
Jamot	1966	259	Outaouais		47.0833°N 77.5°W
Janssoone	1965	284.9	Côte-Nord		49.3333°N 69.6667°W
Jauffret	1965	261.6	Côte-Nord		51.6667°N 68.0833°W
Jérémie	1802-11-22	259	Nord-du-Québec		50.0833°N 78.75°W
Jersey	1829-07-21	230.7	Saint-Côme–Linière	Chaudière-Appalaches	46°N 70.583333°W
Jetté	1920-10-16	255	La Matapédia	Bas-Saint-Laurent	48.233330555556°N 67.516661111111°W
Joannès	1916-12-16	259	Rouyn-Noranda	Abitibi-Témiscamingue	48.216666°N 78.75°W
Joffre	1916-09-16	253.7	Bas-Saint-Laurent		48.8333°N 66.75°W
Jogues	1916-12-09	238.75	Saguenay–Lac-Saint-Jean		48.8333°N 71.5833°W
Johan-Beetz	1965-06-05	246.05	Côte-Nord		50.3333°N 62.6667°W
Johnstone	1965-06-05	259	Nord-du-Québec		49.9167°N 76.75°W
Joliette	1863-12-26	139.6	Lanaudière		46.3333°N 73.6667°W
Joly	1885-02-28	190.2	Laurentides		46.25°N 74.75°W
Joncas	1936-01-11	309.2	Gaspésie–Îles-de-la-Madeleine		48.5833°N 64.75°W
Jonquière	1850-06-15	145.7	Saguenay–Lac-Saint-Jean		48.4167°N 71.25°W
Josselin	1916-12-16	221.8	Senneterre (ville)	Abitibi-Témiscamingue	48.783333333333°N 77°W
Jourdan	1920-10-16	259	Abitibi-Témiscamingue		47.75°N 77.9167°W
Joutel	1965-02-20	256.4	Nord-du-Québec		49.5°N 78.3333°W
Joybert	1965-05-06	259	Saguenay–Lac-Saint-Jean; Nord-du-Québec		50.416666666667°N 73.5°W
Juchereau	1965-06-05	212.4	Saguenay–Lac-Saint-Jean		49.8333°N 72.5833°W
Julien	1965-02-20	248.65	Eeyou Istchee Baie-James	Nord-du-Québec	50.083333333333°N 75.25°W
Jumonville	1965-06-05	252.2	Saguenay–Lac-Saint-Jean		50°N 73.5°W
Juneau		237.15	La Tuque	Mauricie	48.7°N 75.416666666667°W
Jurie	1916-12-16	259	Senneterre (ville)	Abitibi-Témiscamingue	48.216666°N 76.8°W
Kaine	1906-05-26	264.45	Mauricie, Lanaudière		46.666666666667°N 73.5°W
Kalm	1966-05-14	88.05	Abitibi-Témiscamingue		48.8333°N 75.5833°W
Kegaska	1869-06-12	157.85	Côte-Nord		50.25°N 61.4167°W
Kénogami	1916-12-16	250.9	Saguenay–Lac-Saint-Jean		48.4167°N 71.5°W
Kensington	1871-04-08	254.95	Déléage	Outaouais	46.383333333333°N 75.833333333333°W
Kiamika	1890-12-20	182.4	Kiamika	Laurentides	46.4167°N 75.3333°W
Kildare	1803-06-24	136.75	Lanaudière		46.0833°N 73.75°W
Kilkenny	1832-02-17	212.35	Laurentides, Lanaudière		45.916666666667°N 73.833333333333°W
Kingsey	1803-06-07	243.65	Mauricie		45.8333°N 72.1667°W
Kondiaronk	1966-05-14	248.65	Lac-Pythonga	Outaouais	46.933333°N 76.683333°W
Krieghoff	1965-02-20	246.05	Nord-du-Québec		49.8333°N 75.8333°W
L'Hermitte		259	Abitibi-Témiscamingue		47.3333°N 78.25°W
La Barre	1855-04-28	182.1	Saguenay–Lac-Saint-Jean		48.5°N 71.5833°W
La Brosse	1855-04-28	188.6	Saguenay–Lac-Saint-Jean		49.8333°N 75.8333°W
La Bruère	1965-05-06	259	Saguenay–Lac-Saint-Jean, Mauricie		48.583333333333°N 73.666666666667°W
La Chaudière	1855-04-28	259	Saguenay–Lac-Saint-Jean		49.8333°N 75.8333°W
La Corne	1916-12-16	259	La Corne	Abitibi-Témiscamingue	48.366666°N 77.883333°W
La Dauversière	1965-02-20	259	Saguenay–Lac-Saint-Jean; Nord-du-Québec		49.566666°N 74.366666°W
La Forest	1855-04-28	256.4	Saguenay–Lac-Saint-Jean		48.5°N 71.5833°W
La Gauchetière	1855-04-28	251.25	Saguenay–Lac-Saint-Jean		49.8333°N 75.8333°W
La Gorgendière	1855-04-28	147.7	Saguenay–Lac-Saint-Jean		49.5833°N 74.3333°W
La Grange	1940-01-27	388	La Matapédia	Bas-Saint-Laurent	48.566669444444°N 66.916661111111°W
La Martinière	1965-06-05	242.8	Saguenay–Lac-Saint-Jean		48.5833°N 73.6667°W
La Minerve	1855-04-28	167.6	Saguenay–Lac-Saint-Jean		49.8333°N 75.8333°W
La Morandière	1855-04-28	259	Saguenay–Lac-Saint-Jean		50.0833°N 78.0833°W
La Motte	1855-04-28	259	Saguenay–Lac-Saint-Jean		48.5°N 71.5833°W
La Noue	1855-04-28	207.2	Saguenay–Lac-Saint-Jean		47.1667°N 78.8333°W
La Pause	1855-04-28	259	Saguenay–Lac-Saint-Jean		49.8333°N 75.8333°W
La Peltrie	1965-06-05	259	Saguenay–Lac-Saint-Jean		48.3333°N 78.1667°W
La Pérouse	1965-06-05	259	Eeyou Istchee Baie-James	Nord-du-Québec	49.95°N 77.883333333333°W
La Potardière	1855-04-28	220.15	Saguenay–Lac-Saint-Jean		49.8333°N 75.8333°W
La Poterie	1855-04-28	326.35	Mauricie; Lanaudière		48.5°N 71.5833°W
La Rabeyre	1855-04-28	259	Saguenay–Lac-Saint-Jean		49.8333°N 75.8333°W
La Reine	1916-12-16	259	Saguenay–Lac-Saint-Jean		48.5°N 71.5833°W
La Ribourde	1965-02-20	264.2	Saguenay–Lac-Saint-Jean		49.5833°N 74.3333°W
La Richardière	1965-06-05	207.2	Saguenay–Lac-Saint-Jean		48.5833°N 73.6667°W
La Rivière	1936-01-11	297.85	Saguenay–Lac-Saint-Jean		48.5°N 71.5833°W
La Roche	1882-05-05	202	Rimouski-Neigette	Bas-Saint-Laurent	48.05°N 68.483330555556°W
La Rochelle	1966-05-14	259	Lac-Nilgaut	Outaouais	46.783333333333°N 77.116666666667°W
La Rochette	1965-02-20	259	Eeyou Istchee Baie-James	Nord-du-Québec	50.233333333333°N 74.966666666667°W
La Roncière	1936-01-11	279.7	Saguenay–Lac-Saint-Jean		50.25°N 74.8333°W
La Ronde	1965-02-20	266.75	Saguenay–Lac-Saint-Jean		49.8333°N 75.8333°W
La Rouvillière	1965-06-05	259	Saguenay–Lac-Saint-Jean		48.5°N 71.5833°W
La Salle	1893-02-11	259	Linton	Capitale-Nationale	47.25°N 72.166666666667°W
La Sarre	1965-06-05	259	Saguenay–Lac-Saint-Jean		48.75°N 79.1667°W
La Tourette	1965-06-05	233.1	Saguenay–Lac-Saint-Jean		49.8333°N 75.8333°W
La Tousche	1965-06-05	244.6	Saguenay–Lac-Saint-Jean		48.5833°N 73.6667°W
La Trappe	1965-06-05	271.15	Saguenay–Lac-Saint-Jean		49.1667°N 72.1667°W
La Vallière	1965-06-05	246.05	Saguenay–Lac-Saint-Jean		49.8333°N 75.8333°W
La Vérendrye	1940-01-27	372	Lac-Casault	Bas-Saint-Laurent	48.383330555556°N 66.933330555556°W
Laas	1916-12-16	297.2	Abitibi-Témiscamingue; Nord-du-Québec		48.916666666667°N 77.166666666667°W
Labelle	1894-07-28	259	Labelle	Laurentides	46.166666666667°N 74.916666666667°W
Laberge	1965-06-05	254.95	Nord-du-Québec		49.4167°N 79.1667°W
Labrecque	1965-06-05	199.4	Saguenay–Lac-Saint-Jean		48.75°N 71.5°W
Labrie	1965-06-05	256.4	Saguenay–Lac-Saint-Jean		49.5833°N 74.3333°W
Lacasse		259	Mauricie		48.6667°N 75.1667°W
Laclède	1965-06-05	259	Côte-Nord		50.0833°N 78.0833°W
Lacombe	1965-06-05	259	Saguenay–Lac-Saint-Jean		49.5833°N 74.3333°W
Lacoste	1965-06-05	129.5	Capitale-Nationale		49.8333°N 76.3333°W
Lacroix	1936-01-11	234.7	Mauricie, Nord-du-Québec		48.983333333333°N 75.416666666667°W
Lafitau	1965-05-06	259	Saguenay–Lac-Saint-Jean, Mauricie		48.5833°N 73.9167°W
Laflamme	1965-05-06	259	Saguenay–Lac-Saint-Jean, Mauricie		48.416666666667°N 73.666666666667°W
Laflèche	1965-06-05	366.85	Côte-Nord		48.3333°N 78.1667°W
LaFontaine	1863-01-31	259	Sainte-Perpétue (L’Islet)	Chaudière-Appalaches	47.083333333333°N 69.833333333333°W
Laforce	1965-06-05	191.8	Gaspésie–Îles-de-la-Madeleine		48.3333°N 78.1667°W
Lagacé	1936-01-11	259	Mauricie		48.5833°N 66.9167°W
Lagorce	1965-06-05	277.15	Bas-Saint-Laurent		49.5833°N 72.8333°W
Lajoie	1965-06-05	253.8	Abitibi-Témiscamingue		47.6667°N 77.5°W
Lalande	1965-06-05	267.1	Côte-Nord		50.3333°N 60.8333°W
Lalemant	1965-06-05	192.9	Saguenay–Lac-Saint-Jean		48.0833°N 70.6667°W
Laliberté	1965-06-05	323.75	Mauricie		49.1667°N 72.1667°W
Lamarck	1965-02-20	259	Eeyou Istchee Baie-James	Nord-du-Québec	49.95°N 75.25°W
Lamberville	1965-06-05	266.75	Côte-Nord		51.9167°N 67.0833°W
Lambton	1965-06-05	83.25	Estrie		45.9167°N 71.0833°W
Lamontagne	1965-06-05	259	Abitibi-Témiscamingue		48.75°N 79.1667°W
Lamy	1965-06-05	255.35	Mauricie		49.9167°N 77.9167°W
Lanaudière	1965-06-05	259	Saguenay–Lac-Saint-Jean		48.75°N 79.1667°W
Landrienne	1936-12-16	259	Landrienne	Abitibi-Témiscamingue	48.5°N 77.883333°W
Landry	1965-06-05	259	Nord-du-Québec		47.8333°N 74.75°W
Langelier	1965-06-05	295.4	Nord-du-Québec		49.8333°N 76.3333°W
Langevin	1862-03-22	250.5	Saint-Louis-de-Gonzague (Les Etchemins)	Chaudière-Appalaches	46.366661111111°N 70.283330555556°W
Langis	1925-06-13	139	Saint-Vianney	Bas-Saint-Laurent	48.616661111111°N 67.416661111111°W
Langloiserie	1965-06-05	258.65	Nord-du-Québec		49.1667°N 72.1667°W
Languedoc	1965-06-05	259	Nord-du-Québec		49.1667°N 72.1667°W
Lanoullier	1936-01-11	359	Nord-du-Québec		49.8333°N 76.3333°W
Lantagnac	1965-06-05	170.95	Nord-du-Québec		48.75°N 79.1667°W
Laperrière	1965-06-05	217.55	Nord-du-Québec		49.8333°N 76.3333°W
Lapeyrère	1907-06-07	285.3	Lac-Lapeyrère; Mauricie	Capitale-Nationale	47.183333333333°N 72.383333333333°W
Lapointe	1965-06-05	178.7	Nord-du-Québec		49.1667°N 72.1667°W
Laporte	1965-06-05	261.6	Nord-du-Québec		50.25°N 74.8333°W
Lapparent	1965-06-05	155.4	Nord-du-Québec		50.4167°N 74.0833°W
Lareau	1965-06-05	259	Nord-du-Québec		49.8333°N 76.3333°W
Larocque	1965-06-05	215.75	Nord-du-Québec		48.4167°N 66.9167°W
Lartigue	1920-10-16	132.7	Saguenay–Lac-Saint-Jean		48.25°N 71.3333°W
Larue	1894-02-17	167.95	Capitale-Nationale		47.3333°N 72°W
Laterrière	1850-03-23	202.35	Saguenay	Saguenay–Lac-Saint-Jean	48.283330555556°N 71.166661111111°W
Lathbury	1919-02-15	161.85	Saguenay–Lac-Saint-Jean		49.1667°N 72.1667°W
Latour	1920-10-16	116.55	Saguenay–Lac-Saint-Jean		49.1667°N 72.1667°W
Latulipe	1909-06-19	262.25	Abitibi-Témiscamingue		47.5°N 79°W
Laubanie	1920-10-16	259	Abitibi-Témiscamingue		47.9167°N 77.9167°W
Lauberivière	1965-06-05	259	Saguenay–Lac-Saint-Jean		49.25°N 73°W
Laudanet	1920-10-16	259	Abitibi-Témiscamingue		47.75°N 78.3333°W
Launay	1916-12-16	259	Bas-Saint-Laurent		48.6667°N 78.5°W
Laure	1891-09-26	172.4	Bas-Saint-Laurent		47.6667°N 72.1667°W
Laurier	1899-05-06	268.7	La Tuque; Capitale-Nationale	Mauricie	47.35°N 72.316666666667°W
Laurin	1965-06-05	310.8	Bas-Saint-Laurent		50.4167°N 74.0833°W
Laussedat	1965-06-05	259	Bas-Saint-Laurent		52.0833°N 68.0833°W
Lauzon	1965-06-05	259	Bas-Saint-Laurent		48.4167°N 66.9167°W
Laval	1965-02-20	207.6	Bas-Saint-Laurent		50.4167°N 74.0833°W
Lavallée	1965-02-20	233.1	Bas-Saint-Laurent		47.8333°N 73.6667°W
Laverdière	1966-06-08	142.45	Laurentides; Lanaudière		48.4167°N 66.9167°W
Lavergne	1940-02-10	259	Nord-du-Québec		49.0833°N 79°W
Laverlochère	1895-06-22	321.4	Abitibi-Témiscamingue		47.4167°N 79.25°W
Lavigne	1965-12-18	259	La Tuque	Mauricie	47.833333333333°N 74.133333333333°W
Laviolette	1894-07-21	198.3	Lanaudière		46.8333°N 73.9167°W
Lavoie	1906-06-30	148.1	Mauricie		47.9167°N 72.8333°W
Le Baillif	1906-06-30	259	Mauricie		47.9167°N 72.8333°W
Le Barroys		284.9	Mauricie		47.9167°N 72.8333°W
Le Ber	1965-06-05	261.6	Mauricie		49.5833°N 73.6667°W
Le Borgne	1965-06-05	259	Mauricie		47.1667°N 78.25°W
Le Breton	1965-06-05	103.6	Mauricie		47.9167°N 72.8333°W
Le Caron	1965-06-05	242.7	Mauricie		46.5°N 78.6667°W
Le Clercq	1916-09-16	249.55	Rivière-Bonjour	Bas-Saint-Laurent	48.766666111111°N 66.916666111111°W
Le Courtois	1965-06-05	259	Mauricie		48.75°N 66.9167°W
Le Gardeur	1908-10-17	222.6	Côte-Nord-du-Golfe-du-Saint-Laurent	Côte-Nord	50.333333333333°N 60.166666666667°W
Le Jeune	1892-07-09	255	Mékinac	Mauricie	46.916661111111°N 72.583338888889°W
Le Maistre	1965-06-05	259	Mauricie		46.9167°N 72.5833°W
Le May	1966-05-14	259	Mauricie		49.5833°N 73.6667°W
Le Mercier	1965-06-05	259	Mauricie		48.6667°N 70.5833°W
Le Noblet	1966-05-14	237.15	Mauricie		47.9167°N 72.8333°W
Le Strat	1965-06-05	259	Mauricie		48.6667°N 70.5833°W
Le Tac	1965-06-05	274.55	Mauricie		48.6667°N 70.5833°W
Le Tardif	1965-06-05	259	Mauricie		51.75°N 67.5833°W
Leau	1965-06-05	259	Mauricie		48.75°N 66.9167°W
Leblanc	1965-06-05	259	Mauricie		49.5°N 77.5°W
Lebret	1940-01-27	222.6	Gaspésie–Îles-de-la-Madeleine		48.75°N 66.9167°W
Lecompte	1965-02-20	235.7	Senneterre (ville)	Abitibi-Témiscamingue	48.783333333333°N 76.583333333333°W
Lecoq	1965-02-20	259	Saguenay–Lac-Saint-Jean		51.75°N 67.5833°W
Leduc	1965-06-05	259	Saguenay–Lac-Saint-Jean		52.3333°N 67.1667°W
Leeds	1802-08-14	270.1	Saint-Pierre-de-Broughton	Chaudière-Appalaches	46.25°N 71.25°W
Lefebvre	1965-06-05	218.55	Saguenay–Lac-Saint-Jean		46.9167°N 72.5833°W
Lefrançois	1936-01-11	329.25	Saguenay–Lac-Saint-Jean		49.0833°N 65.4167°W
Legal	1965-06-05	259	Saguenay–Lac-Saint-Jean		48.6667°N 70.5833°W
Légaré	1965-06-05	208.4	Saguenay–Lac-Saint-Jean		46.9167°N 74.0833°W
Legendre	1966-08-06	168.35	Saguenay–Lac-Saint-Jean		46.9167°N 72.5833°W
Leigne	1965-06-05	251.25	Saguenay–Lac-Saint-Jean		48.6667°N 70.5833°W
Lemaire	1965-06-05	254.95	Saguenay–Lac-Saint-Jean		48.6667°N 70.5833°W
Leman	1965-06-05	290.1	Saguenay–Lac-Saint-Jean		47°N 75.1667°W
Lemieux	1917-03-10	254.95	Gaspésie–Îles-de-la-Madeleine		48.8333°N 66.1667°W
LeMoine	1965-02-20	253.8	Nord-du-Québec		49.8333°N 74.1667°W
Leneuf	1868-05-23	186.15	Côte-Nord		49.5°N 77.5°W
Lenoir	1966-06-08	207.2	Laurentides; Lanaudière		46.9167°N 74.5833°W
Lens	1965-05-06	259	Senneterre (ville)	Abitibi-Témiscamingue	47.916666666667°N 76.15°W
Lepage	1874-12-26	142	Saint-Alexandre-des-Lacs	Bas-Saint-Laurent	48.416661111111°N 67.333338888889°W
Lesage	1965-02-20	165.7	Laurentides		49.5°N 77.5°W
Lescarbot	1965-12-18	259	La Tuque	Mauricie	47.8°N 72.116666°W
Lescure	1965-02-20	253.8	Nord-du-Québec		49.5°N 77.5°W
Leslie	1866-06-16	259	Otter Lake	Outaouais	45.85°N 76.483333333333°W
Lespérance	1965-02-20	243.45	Nord-du-Québec		49.5°N 75.8333°W
Lespinay	1965-02-20	248.65	Nord-du-Québec		49.1667°N 75.25°W
Lessard	1965-02-20	53.05	Chaudière-Appalaches		47°N 70.1667°W
Lesseps	1936-01-11	284.1	Mont-Albert	Gaspésie–Îles-de-la-Madeleine	48.85°N 65.983330555556°W
Lesueur	1965-02-20	259	Nord-du-Québec		49.5°N 77.5°W
Letellier	1866-10-13	665.65	Côte-Nord		50.3333°N 66.3333°W
Letondal	1965-12-18	259	Mauricie		47.8333°N 74.3333°W
Levasseur	1965-06-05	259	Mauricie		48.4167°N 74.1667°W
Leventoux	1965-06-05	246.05	Côte-Nord		51.9167°N 67.5833°W
Leverrier	1868-10-17	198.9	Saint-Adalbert	Chaudière-Appalaches	46.833333333333°N 69.983333333333°W
Levilliers	1965-02-20	246.05	Nord-du-Québec		50.25°N 75.0833°W
Lévy	1965-06-05	248.65	Nord-du-Québec		49.8333°N 74.8333°W
Lidice	1908-10-17	396.6	Saguenay–Lac-Saint-Jean		49.9167°N 71.4167°W
Liégeois	1965	259	Saguenay–Lac-Saint-Jean		48.6667°N 70.3333°W
Liénard	1908-10-17	182.1	Côte-Nord		50.25°N 60°W
Ligneris	1916-10-16	259	Abitibi-Témiscamingue; Nord-du-Québec		48.9167°N 78.5°W
Limousin	1966-05-14	259	Lac-Pythonga	Outaouais	46.783333°N 76.266666°W
Lindsay	1965-06-05	259	La Tuque	Mauricie	48.683333333333°N 74.35°W
Lingwick	1807-03-07	274.75	Lingwick	Estrie	45.583333°N 71.333333°W
Linière	1852-05-29	267.1	Chaudière-Appalaches		46°N 70.4167°W
Lislois		259	Côte-Nord		52.8333°N 67.0833°W
Litchfield	1834-10-11	207.8	Litchfield	Outaouais	45.8333°N 76.5833°W
Livaudière	1965-06-05	259	Nord-du-Québec		49.9167°N 77.25°W
Livernois	1965-12-18	323.75	Lac-Normand	Mauricie	47.166666°N 73.45°W
Lizée	1965-06-05	259	Saguenay–Lac-Saint-Jean		50.4167°N 73.25°W
Lochaber	1807-03-26	268.55	Lochaber, Lochaber-Partie-Ouest	Outaouais	45.6667°N 75.25°W
Logan	1966-05-14	259	Senneterre (ville)	Abitibi-Témiscamingue	48.5°N 75.716666666667°W
Longfellow	1965-06-05	251.25	Côte-Nord		50.5833°N 63.5833°W
Loranger	1896-06-13	202.35	Nominingue	Laurentides	46.4167°N 75°W
Lorimier	1966-05-14	207.2	Lac-Nilgaut	Outaouais	47.066666°N 77.766666°W
Lorne	1965-06-05	259	Saguenay–Lac-Saint-Jean		49.0833°N 73.6667°W
Lorrain	1966-05-14	259	Outaouais		47.0833°N 76.9167°W
Lorraine	1966-05-14	238.3	Lac-Pythonga	Outaouais	46.65°N 76.65°W
Lortie	1965-12-18	234.05	Mauricie		47.6667°N 74.25°W
Loubias	1966-05-14	253.8	Outaouais		47.3333°N 76.5°W
Louise	1920-10-16	88.05	Estrie		45.4167°N 70.75°W
Louvicourt	1920-10-16	259	Abitibi-Témiscamingue		48.0833°N 77.4167°W
Louvigny	1965-06-05	259	Lac-Ashuapmushuan	Saguenay–Lac-Saint-Jean	49.133333333333°N 73.25°W
Low	1859-12-10	247.6	Low	Outaouais	45.833333333333°N 76.016666666667°W
Lozeau	1965-02-20	253.8	Nord-du-Québec		49.8333°N 77.5°W
Lucière	1965-02-20	160.6	Nord-du-Québec		50.25°N 75.4167°W
Lusignan	1966-08-06	207.2	Lanaudière		46.75°N 74.25°W
Lussier	1920-10-16	259	Lanaudière		46.3333°N 74.1667°W
Lynch	1917-07-28	208.4	Laurentides		46.5°N 74.8333°W
Lyonnais	1966-05-14	259	Lac-Nilgaut	Outaouais	46.816666°N 76.9°W
Lyonne	1965-06-05	220.15	Saguenay–Lac-Saint-Jean		48.5°N 72.5833°W
Lytton	1869-07-31	233.9	Montcerf-Lytton	Outaouais	46.6667°N 76.0833°W
Machault	1965-02-20	248.65	Nord-du-Québec		49.25°N 75.25°W
MacNider	1842-08-23	254	Saint-Damase	Bas-Saint-Laurent	48.666661111111°N 67.833338888889°W
Macpès	1922-03-11	230.65	Bas-Saint-Laurent		48.3333°N 68.4167°W
Maddington	1908-12-01	215.3	Mauricie		46.25°N 72.25°W
Magnan	1965-06-05	259	La Tuque	Mauricie	48.7°N 74.566666666667°W
Magog	1849-04-25	90.65	Magog	Estrie	45.25°N 72.1667°W
Mailloux	1863-05-23	134.35	Chaudière-Appalaches		46.6667°N 70.4167°W
Maine	1966-05-14	271.95	Lac-Pythonga	Outaouais	46.65°N 76.266666°W
Maizerets	1965-02-20	259	Nord-du-Québec		49.25°N 78.0833°W
Major	1920-10-16	288.3	Ferme-Neuve	Laurentides	46.766666666667°N 75.616666666667°W
Malakoff	1920-10-16	185	Sheenboro	Outaouais	46.1667°N 77.5°W
Malapart	1965-06-05	259	Côte-Nord		52.3333°N 67.5833°W
Malartic	1916-12-16	259	Malartic	Abitibi-Témiscamingue	48.1667°N 78.1667°W
Malbaie	1842-01-01	153.75	Percé	Gaspésie–Îles-de-la-Madeleine	48.633333°N 64.383333°W
Malherbe	1891-10-03	356.1	Saguenay–Lac-Saint-Jean		48.0833°N 72.0833°W
Malhiot	1877-09-01	246.85	La Tuque	Mauricie	47.383333°N 72.716666°W
Maltais	1940-02-10	323.75	Passes-Dangereuses	Saguenay–Lac-Saint-Jean	48.916666°N 71.583333°W
Mance	1965-02-20	248.65	Saguenay–Lac-Saint-Jean		49.5833°N 73.9167°W
Manicouagan	1866-10-27	149.75	Côte-Nord		49.0833°N 68.3333°W
Maniwaki	1920-10-16	211.25	Outaouais		46.4167°N 76.0833°W
Mann	1842-01-01	317.7	Pointe-à-la-Croix	Gaspésie–Îles-de-la-Madeleine	48.116666°N 66.666666°W
Manneville	1916-12-16	259	Abitibi-Témiscamingue		48.5°N 78.5°W
Mansfield	1849-02-17	121.4	Mansfield-et-Pontefract	Outaouais	45.883333333333°N 76.75°W
Manthet		242.8	Nord-du-Québec		50.0833°N 79.4167°W
Marceau		266.75	Mauricie, Nord-du-Québec		49°N 75°W
Marchand	1892-10-29	318.85	Rivière-Rouge	Laurentides	46.383333333333°N 74.85°W
Marche	1966-05-14	259	Lac-Nilgaut	Outaouais	46.5°N 77.333333°W
Marcil	1916-10-28	208.4	Gaspésie–Îles-de-la-Madeleine		48.5°N 65.9167°W
Marest	1965-02-20	253.8	Nord-du-Québec		49.3333°N 77.5°W
Margane	1965-06-05	306.9	Côte-Nord		50.4167°N 64.6667°W
Margry	1965-02-20	230.5	Eeyou Istchee Baie-James	Nord-du-Québec	49.366666°N 75.866666°W
Maria	1842-01-01	172	Maria	Gaspésie–Îles-de-la-Madeleine	48.216666°N 66°W
Maricourt	1966-05-14	266.75	Abitibi-Témiscamingue		48.6667°N 76.1667°W
Marin	1965-02-20	274.55	Eeyou Istchee Baie-James	Nord-du-Québec	49.366666666667°N 75.65°W
Marlow	1850-12-21	250.9	Chaudière-Appalaches, Estrie		45.8333°N 70.5833°W
Marmette	1965-06-05	259	Mauricie		48.5833°N 74.75°W
Marmier	1892-07-09	112.5	Mékinac	Mauricie	46.983330555556°N 72.466669444444°W
Marquette	1965-06-05	259	Lac-Ashuapmushuan	Saguenay–Lac-Saint-Jean	48.833333333333°N 73.9°W
Marrias	1920-12-16	259	Abitibi-Témiscamingue		47.9167°N 77.5°W
Marsal	1907-07-20	242.9	Saint-Augustin, Côte-Nord, Quebec	Côte-Nord	51.366666666667°N 58.166666666667°W
Marsolet		259	Saguenay–Lac-Saint-Jean		49.6667°N 72.8333°W
Marston	1866-12-01	286.1	Estrie		45.5°N 71°W
Martigny	1866-12-01	242.8	Eeyou Istchee Baie-James	Nord-du-Québec	50.083333333333°N 79.166666666667°W
Martin	1916-12-16	259	Senneterre (ville)	Abitibi-Témiscamingue	48.5°N 76.8°W
Maseres	1966-05-14	259	Abitibi-Témiscamingue		48.8333°N 75.9167°W
Masham	1850-06-15	240.8	La Pêche	Outaouais	45.6667°N 76.0833°W
Massé	1918-03-16	242.8	Bas-Saint-Laurent		48.3333°N 68°W
Massicotte		259	Nord-du-Québec		49.9167°N 79.4167°W
Masson	1894-07-21	230.9	Lanaudière		46.75°N 73.75°W
Matalik	1870-08-13	206	Albertville	Bas-Saint-Laurent	48.283330555556°N 67.316669444444°W
Matane	1834-12-15	310.8	Saint-Léandre	Bas-Saint-Laurent	48.716666°N 67.6°W
Matapédia	1842-01-01	360	Saint-Alexis-de-Matapédia	Gaspésie–Îles-de-la-Madeleine	47.933330555556°N 67.366669444444°W
Matawin	1945-03-17	144	Lac-Normand	Mauricie	46.95°N 73.083338888889°W
Mathieu	1834-12-15	251.25	La Tuque	Mauricie	48.833333333333°N 74.766666666667°W
Maupassant	1834-12-15	284.9	Les Lacs-du-Témiscamingue	Abitibi-Témiscamingue	47.2°N 77.983333°W
Mazarin	1965-02-20	259	Nord-du-Québec		49.0833°N 78.3333°W
Mazenod	1920-10-16	155.7	Abitibi-Témiscamingue		47.0833°N 79.3333°W
Mazérac	1834-12-15	259	Abitibi-Témiscamingue		47.75°N 78.1667°W
McCorkill	1965-02-20	256.4	Saguenay–Lac-Saint-Jean; Nord-du-Québec		49.9167°N 73.9167°W
McGill	1894-03-03	293.4	Laurentides		46.1667°N 75.5833°W
McKenzie	1965-02-20	246.05	Chibougamau	Nord-du-Québec	49.95°N 74.35°W
McLachlin	1908-03-28	386.25	Abitibi-Témiscamingue		46.9167°N 78.6667°W
McOuat	1965-02-20	246.05	Saguenay–Lac-Saint-Jean; Nord-du-Québec		50.5833°N 73.6667°W
McSweeney	1965-06-05	259	La Tuque	Mauricie	48.7°N 74.766666666667°W
Meilleur	1936-01-11	259	Saguenay–Lac-Saint-Jean		48.75°N 73.6667°W
Mékinac	1874-11-07	238	Trois-Rives	Mauricie	46.916666666667°N 72.75°W
Melbourne	1805-04-03	178.05	Melbourne	Estrie	45.583333°N 72.166666°W
Membré	1966-05-14	259	Abitibi-Témiscamingue		47.6667°N 77.3333°W
Ménard	1869-07-31	215.3	Saguenay–Lac-Saint-Jean		49.1667°N 72°W
Menneval	1965-06-05	259	Côte-Nord		52.5°N 67.8333°W
Merçan	1965-06-05	253.8	Saguenay–Lac-Saint-Jean		50.25°N 73.25°W
Mercier	1905-12-23	233.1	Abitibi-Témiscamingue		46.8333°N 79.1667°W
Mesplet	1966-05-14	246.05	Abitibi-Témiscamingue		48.8333°N 75.75°W
Mésy	1869-07-31	152.75	Saguenay–Lac-Saint-Jean		48.3333°N 71.6667°W
Métabetchouan	1869-07-31	166.75	Saguenay–Lac-Saint-Jean		48.4167°N 72°W
Metgermette-Nord	1885-10-17	278.05	Chaudière-Appalaches		46.1667°N 70.3333°W
Metgermette-Sud	1885-10-31	110.8	Chaudière-Appalaches		45.9167°N 70.3333°W
Meulande	1965-06-05	259	Nord-du-Québec		49.8333°N 76.75°W
Michaux	1965-12-18	155.4	Mauricie		47.9167°N 72.6667°W
Mignault	1965-02-20	251.25	Saguenay–Lac-Saint-Jean		49.4167°N 73.9167°W
Miller	1965-06-05	259	Lac-au-Brochet	Côte-Nord	49°N 69.916666666667°W
Millet	1965-06-05	256.4	Eeyou Istchee Baie-James	Nord-du-Québec	50.1°N 77.433333°W
Milnikek	1870-08-13	267	Routhierville	Bas-Saint-Laurent	48.166661111111°N 67.25°W
Milot	1924-08-02	278.4	Saguenay–Lac-Saint-Jean		48.9167°N 71.75°W
Milton	1803-01-29	163.7	Saint-Valérien-de-Milton	Montérégie	45.5°N 72.75°W
Mingan	1965-06-05	385.9	Côte-Nord		50.4167°N 64.1667°W
Miniac	1916-12-16	259	Abitibi-Témiscamingue; Nord-du-Québec		48.9167°N 78.0833°W
Mitchell	1966-08-06	297.85	Outaouais		46.8333°N 76.0833°W
Moisie	1865-08-26	404.7	Côte-Nord		50.4167°N 66°W
Monrepos	1965-06-05	259	Côte-Nord		52.25°N 68.5°W
Monseignat	1965-06-05	266.75	Nord-du-Québec		49.9167°N 76.3333°W
Montalembert	1965-06-05	259	Nord-du-Québec		49.8333°N 76.0833°W
Montanier	1920-10-16	259	Abitibi-Témiscamingue		48.0833°N 78.5°W
Montauban	1870-11-06	178.85	Capitale-Nationale; Mauricie		46.8333°N 72.25°W
Montbeillard	1920-10-16	259	Rouyn-Noranda	Abitibi-Témiscamingue	48.083333°N 79.166666°W
Montbray	1916-12-16	259	Abitibi-Témiscamingue		48.3333°N 79.4167°W
Montcalm	1857-01-17	142.05	Montcalm	Laurentides	46°N 74.5°W
Montesson	1908-02-01	205.6	Côte-Nord		50.9167°N 59.25°W
Montgay	1916-12-16	283.6	Abitibi-Témiscamingue		48.5°N 77.25°W
Montgolfier	1965-02-20	259	Eeyou Istchee Baie-James	Nord-du-Québec	49.666666666667°N 78.533333333333°W
Montminy	1857-02-14	126	Saint-Paul-de-Montminy	Chaudière-Appalaches	46.75°N 70.333338888889°W
Montpetit	1965-06-05	259	Mauricie		48.0833°N 75°W
Montreuil	1920-10-16	196.85	Abitibi-Témiscamingue		47.75°N 79.4167°W
Montviel	1965-06-05	256.4	Nord-du-Québec		49.8333°N 76.5°W
Moquin	1966-05-14	256.4	Abitibi-Témiscamingue, Nord-du-Québec		48.9167°N 76.1667°W
Moreau	1900-06-02	117.35	Laurentides		46.6667°N 75.25°W
Morency	1920-12-04	1106	Côte-Nord		49.5833°N 68.1667°W
Morin	1852-02-28	121.4	Laurentides		46°N 74.1667°W
Morisset	1965-02-20	277.15	Nord-du-Québec		50.8333°N 73.25°W
Mornay	1965-06-05	259	Saguenay–Lac-Saint-Jean		49.25°N 73.25°W
Morris	1965-02-20	259	Eeyou Istchee Baie-James	Nord-du-Québec	49.8°N 77.233333333333°W
Mortagne	1901-01-26	310.15	Abitibi-Témiscamingue		46.5°N 78.25°W
Mountain	1965-02-20	259	Eeyou Istchee Baie-James	Nord-du-Québec	49.216666°N 76.533333°W
Mourier	1940-01-27	240.8	Gaspésie–Îles-de-la-Madeleine		48.5833°N 65.5°W
Mousseau	1917-07-07	212.85	Laurentides		46.5833°N 74.8333°W
Mulgrave	1865-09-23	189.8	Mulgrave-et-Derry	Outaouais	45.75°N 75.3333°W
Musquaro	1869-06-12	161.85	Côte-Nord-du-Golfe-du-Saint-Laurent	Côte-Nord	50.216666°N 61.2°W
Muy	1965-02-20	279.7	Nord-du-Québec		49.25°N 76.0833°W
Myrand		259	Mauricie		48.4167°N 75°W
Nadeau	1965-06-05	259	Côte-Nord		51.75°N 67.3333°W
Nantel	1917-08-04	250.9	Laurentides		46.4167°N 74.6667°W
Natashquan	1869-04-24	145.7	Côte-Nord		50.1667°N 61.75°W
Nédélec	1909	178.4	Abitibi-Témiscamingue		47.6667°N 79.4167°W
Neigette	1868-07-04	187.75	Bas-Saint-Laurent		48.4167°N 68.3333°W
Neilson	1965-12-18	193	Portneuf Regional County Municipality	Capitale-Nationale	47.25°N 71.916661111111°W
Nelligan	1965-02-20	259	Nord-du-Québec		49.5°N 76.3333°W
Nelson	1804-04-21	211.25	Dosquet	Chaudière-Appalaches	46.416666°N 71.583333°W
Nemtayé	1920-10-07	202	Sainte-Irène	Bas-Saint-Laurent	48.416661111111°N 67.666661111111°W
Neré	1965-06-05	259	Lac-au-Brochet	Côte-Nord	49.3°N 69.016666°W
Nevers	1965-06-05	259	Mauricie		48.3333°N 74.5833°W
New Richmond	1842	269.1	Gaspésie–Îles-de-la-Madeleine		48.25°N 65.75°W
Newport	1840-03-04	216.1	Chandler	Gaspésie–Îles-de-la-Madeleine	48.333333333333°N 64.833333333333°W
Newport	1801-04-07	266.75	Newport (Estrie)	Estrie	45.383333333333°N 71.45°W
Newton	1805-03-06	75.85	Sainte-Justine-de-Newton	Montérégie	45.366666°N 74.366666°W
Nivernais	1966-05-14	295.25	Outaouais		46.9167°N 77.5°W
Niverville	1965-06-05	201.85	Saguenay–Lac-Saint-Jean		50°N 72.5833°W
Noël	1965-06-05	259	Rivière-Mouchalagane	Côte-Nord	52.083333333333°N 69.916666666667°W
Noiseux	1966-05-14	259	Senneterre (ville)	Abitibi-Témiscamingue	48.5°N 75.933333333333°W
Noré	1965-06-05	259	Côte-Nord		52.0833°N 67.5833°W
Normand	1965-12-18	207.2	Lac-Normand	Mauricie	47.1°N 73.333333333333°W
Normandie	1966-05-14	188.3	Lac-Nilgaut	Outaouais	46.1°N 76.55°W
Normandin	1887-09-24	237.95	Saguenay–Lac-Saint-Jean		48.8333°N 72.5833°W
Normanville	1965-06-05	259	Côte-Nord		52.8333°N 67.3333°W
Northfield	1861-06-15	120.6	Outaouais		46.0833°N 75.9167°W
Nouvelle	1842-01-01	339.95	Nouvelle	Gaspésie–Îles-de-la-Madeleine	48.166666666667°N 66.4°W
Noyelles	1965-02-20	259	Nord-du-Québec		49.5°N 77.25°W
Noyon	1965-02-20	259	Eeyou Istchee Baie-James	Nord-du-Québec	49.516666666667°N 77.616666666667°W
O'Sullivan	1965-02-20	248.65	Nord-du-Québec		49.6667°N 78.75°W
Obalski	1965-02-20	259	Chibougamau	Nord-du-Québec	49.8°N 74.35°W
Oléron	1965-02-20	259	Outaouais		46.6667°N 77.0833°W
Olier	1966-06-08	155.4	Laurentides; Lanaudière		46.75°N 74.5°W
Olscamps	1965-12-18	256.4	Mauricie		49.5°N 77.6667°W
Onslow	1805-03-09	302	Pontiac	Outaouais	45.5833°N 76.1667°W
Opémisca	1965-02-20	248.65	Nord-du-Québec		50°N 75°W
Orford	1801-05-05	355	Orford	Estrie	45.383330555556°N 72.1°W
Orléanais	1966-05-14	256.4	Outaouais		46.75°N 76.5°W
Orvilliers	1965-02-20	259	Nord-du-Québec		49.6667°N 78.75°W
Otis	1869-12-28	169.95	Saguenay–Lac-Saint-Jean		48.25°N 70.6667°W
Ouiatchouan	1867-05-25	99.1	Mashteuiatsh		48.533333°N 72.333333°W
Ouimet	1918-03-30	161.85	Bas-Saint-Laurent		48.3333°N 68.1667°W
Pachot	1965-06-05	259	Côte-Nord		52.5°N 68.75°W
Packington	1965-06-05	182.9	Bas-Saint-Laurent		47.5°N 68.8333°W
Painchaud	1965-06-05	320.1	Bas-Saint-Laurent		47.3333°N 69.5833°W
Palmarolle	1916-12-16	259	Palmarolle	Abitibi-Témiscamingue	48.65°N 79.183333°W
Pambrun	1965-06-05	246.05	Nord-du-Québec		49.25°N 74.75°W
Panet	1868-10-18	191.4	Saint-Just-de-Bretenières	Chaudière-Appalaches	46.583333333333°N 70.083333333333°W
Panneton	1965-06-05	277.55	Saguenay–Lac-Saint-Jean		49.4167°N 72.5833°W
Papin	1965-12-18	142.45	La Tuque	Mauricie	47.933333333333°N 73°W
Papineau	1965-06-05	194.25	Outaouais		46°N 75.3333°W
Paquet	1920-10-16	259	Saguenay–Lac-Saint-Jean		48.8333°N 73°W
Paquin	1965-06-05	259	Côte-Nord		52.5°N 66.583333333333°W
Paradis	1940-02-10	257	Eeyou Istchee Baie-James	Nord-du-Québec	49.233333333333°N 79.183333333333°W
Paramé	1920-10-16	259	Abitibi-Témiscamingue		50.083333333333°N 77.916666666667°W
Parent	1870-05-14	259	Saint-Félicien	Saguenay–Lac-Saint-Jean	48.75°N 72.416666°W
Parke	1920-10-16	205.1	Picard	Bas-Saint-Laurent	47.616666666667°N 69.433333333333°W
Parker	1965-06-05	254.2	Havre-Saint-Pierre	Côte-Nord	50.6°N 63.416666666667°W
Pascalis	1916-12-16	264.9	Senneterre (parish)	Abitibi-Témiscamingue	48.216666666667°N 77.416666666667°W
Pasteur	1965-06-05	331.5	Lac-Walker	Côte-Nord	50.283333°N 66.966666°W
Patapédia	1881-04-16	324	L'Ascension-de-Patapédia	Gaspésie–Îles-de-la-Madeleine	47.916666666667°N 67.333333333333°W
Patton	1871-08-05	152.1	Sainte-Apolline-de-Patton	Chaudière-Appalaches	46.833330555556°N 70.216669444444°W
Pau	1966-06-08	344.45	Lac-Douaire	Laurentides	46.983333°N 75.466666°W
Payment	1965-12-18	259	La Tuque	Mauricie	47.633333°N 73.083333°W
Pélissier	1920-10-16	259	Abitibi-Témiscamingue		47.75°N 77.666666666667°W
Pellegrin	1936-01-11	206.4	Gaspésie–Îles-de-la-Madeleine		48.5°N 64.833333333333°W
Pelletier	1904-05-14	232.3	Saguenay–Lac-Saint-Jean		48.916666666667°N 72.25°W
Percé	1842-01-01	161.85	Gaspésie–Îles-de-la-Madeleine		48.333333333333°N 64.416666666667°W
Perche	1966-05-14	150.2	Outaouais		46.333333333333°N 76.583333333333°W
Peré	1965-02-20	246.05	Saguenay–Lac-Saint-Jean; Nord-du-Québec		50.583333333333°N 73.5°W
Périgny	1918-03-30	359.7	Saguenay–Lac-Saint-Jean		48.083333333333°N 70.416666666667°W
Périgord	1966-05-14	290.1	Outaouais		46.666666666667°N 77.5°W
Pérodeau	1917-11-10	222.6	Lac-Saint-Paul	Laurentides	46.766666°N 75.166666°W
Perrault	1918-12-07	161.85	Lac-Croche	Capitale-Nationale	47.466666666667°N 72.133333333333°W
Perrier		253.8	Mauricie		48.833333333333°N 75°W
Perron	1936-01-11	256.25	Eeyou Istchee Baie-James	Nord-du-Québec	49.083333333333°N 79.416666666667°W
Pershing	1965-02-20	266.75	Abitibi-Témiscamingue		48.083333333333°N 77°W
Pérusse	1918-03-30	235.5	Côte-Nord		51.75°N 69°W
Pétain	1965-05-06	259	Abitibi-Témiscamingue		48.083333333333°N 76.333333333333°W
Pétel	1965-06-05	259	Côte-Nord		51.916666666667°N 68.5°W
Peterborough	1868-12-12	129.5	Lanaudière		46.416666666667°N 73.333333333333°W
Petit	1903-06-06	194.25	Saguenay–Lac-Saint-Jean		49.083333333333°N 71.833333333333°W
Peuvret	1908-10-17	172	Côte-Nord		50.25°N 60.416666666667°W
Pfister	1965-06-05	259	Eeyou Istchee Baie-James; Mauricie	Nord-du-Québec	48.983333333333°N 74.566666666667°W
Phélypeaux	1907-06-01	165.9	Côte-Nord		51.5°N 57.416666666667°W
Piat	1965-06-05	261.6	Lac-Ashuapmushuan	Saguenay–Lac-Saint-Jean	49.7°N 73.666666666667°W
Picard	1965-12-18	323.75	Lac-Normand	Mauricie	47.25°N 73.583333333333°W
Picardie	1966-05-14	269.35	Lac-Pythonga	Outaouais	46.65°N 76.483333333333°W
Picquet	1965-02-20	277.1	Nord-du-Québec		49.25°N 75.666666666667°W
Pijart	1965-06-05	210.75	Saguenay–Lac-Saint-Jean		48.666666666667°N 70.166666666667°W
Pilote	1940-01-27	296.25	Gaspésie–Îles-de-la-Madeleine		48.416666666667°N 66.333333333333°W
Pinault	1920-10-16	189	Saint-Zénon-du-Lac-Humqui	Bas-Saint-Laurent	48.333333333333°N 67.583333333333°W
Pinet	1965-06-05	259	Côte-Nord		51.916666666667°N 69.666666666667°W
Pinsonnault	1965-06-05	303	Saguenay–Lac-Saint-Jean		49.416666666667°N 71.333333333333°W
Plamondon	1965-02-20	243.45	Nord-du-Québec		50.25°N 74.1667°W
Plessis	1904-12-17	171.6	Saguenay–Lac-Saint-Jean		48.25°N 71.5°W
Pohénégamook	1872-03-16	225	Bas-Saint-Laurent		47.5833°N 69.3333°W
Poirier	1965-02-20	225.3	Nord-du-Québec		49.4167°N 78.3333°W
Poisson	1965-02-20	237.15	La Tuque	Mauricie	48.416666°N 75.416666°W
Poitou	1966-05-14	178.7	Outaouais		46.3333°N 76.75°W
Polette	1899-05-06	202.35	Mauricie		47.1667°N 73°W
Pommeroy	1936-01-11	270.75	Abitibi-Témiscamingue		47.0833°N 78.6667°W
Ponsonby	1876-06-03	141.65	Boileau	Outaouais	45.9167°N 74.8333°W
Pont-Gravé	1863-09-19	228.45	Outaouais		48.4167°N 69.75°W
Pontbriand	1890-09-13	220.15	Saguenay–Lac-Saint-Jean		50.5°N 70.5833°W
Pontchartrain	1907-06-01	190.2	Côte-Nord		51.4167°N 57.9167°W
Pontefract	1863-09-19	360.6	Mansfield-et-Pontefract	Outaouais	45.9167°N 74.8333°W
Pontleroy	1920-10-16	259	Abitibi-Témiscamingue		47.9167°N 79.4167°W
Pope	1899-05-06	310	Mont-Laurier	Laurentides	46.65°N 75.6°W
Port-Daniel	1839-10-15	305.05	Gaspésie–Îles-de-la-Madeleine		48.25°N 65°W
Portland	1841-02-26	271.95	Val-des-Monts	Outaouais	45.733333°N 75.583333°W
Pothier	1965-12-18	303.05	Capitale-Nationale; Mauricie		47.25°N 72.5833°W
Potton	1797-10-31	269.35	Estrie		45.0833°N 72.5833°W
Pouchot	1965-02-20	259	Nord-du-Québec		49.6667°N 77.25°W
Poularies	1916-12-16	259	Poularies	Abitibi-Témiscamingue	48.65°N 78.983333°W
Poutrincourt	1965-02-20	264.2	Saguenay–Lac-Saint-Jean		49.0833°N 74.1667°W
Power	1936-01-11	238.75	Mont-Alexandre	Gaspésie–Îles-de-la-Madeleine	48.633333333333°N 64.95°W
Preissac	1916-12-16	233.1	Abitibi-Témiscamingue		48.3333°N 78.3333°W
Preston	1892-07-09	202.55	Outaouais		46.0833°N 75.0833°W
Prévert	1965-02-20	227.9	Nord-du-Québec		49.25°N 75.8333°W
Price	1848-04-15	72.35	Chaudière-Appalaches; Estrie		45.9167°N 71.1667°W
Primeau	1965-06-05	251.2	Saguenay–Lac-Saint-Jean		49.3333°N 71.6667°W
Privat	1916-12-16	259	Abitibi-Témiscamingue		48.6667°N 78.75°W
Proulx	1920-06-12	194.25	Saguenay–Lac-Saint-Jean		49°N 72°W
Provancher		237.15	Mauricie		48.25°N 75.4167°W
Provence	1966-05-14	290.1	Lac-Nilgaut	Outaouais	46.5°N 77.533333333333°W
Provost	1868-08-29	363	Lanaudière		46.5833°N 73.8333°W
Puiseaux	1965-02-20	259	Nord-du-Québec		49.6667°N 79°W
Puyjalon	1965-06-05	259	Côte-Nord		50.4167°N 63.4167°W
Quertier	1965-02-20	259	Côte-Nord		51.6667°N 68.5°W
Quesnel		165.1	Saguenay–Lac-Saint-Jean		48.8333°N 72.8333°W
Quévillon	1965-02-20	323.75	Nord-du-Québec		49.0833°N 77°W
Queylus	1965-02-20	165.75	Nord-du-Québec		49.6667°N 74.3333°W
Quiblier	1966-05-14	259	Lac-Nilgaut	Outaouais	46.633333°N 77.316666°W
Racicot	1965-06-05	259	Côte-Nord		52.0833°N 67.3333°W
Racine	1965-06-05	161.85	Côte-Nord		48.75°N 72.25°W
Radisson	1965-06-05	103.6	Abitibi-Témiscamingue		47.9167°N 75.5833°W
Radnor	1855-06-02	178	Mékinac	Mauricie	46.75°N 72.833338888889°W
Raffeix	1965-06-05	106.2	Côte-Nord		49°N 68.75°W
Rageot	1965-06-05	251.2	Nord-du-Québec		50.0833°N 74.8333°W
Ragueneau	1965-06-05	201.5	Côte-Nord		49.1667°N 68.5°W
Raimbault	1965-06-05	259	Côte-Nord		52.8333°N 67.5833°W
Rainboth	1965-02-20	259	Eeyou Istchee Baie-James	Nord-du-Québec	49.383333°N 78.533333°W
Raisenne	1965-06-05	315.15	Abitibi-Témiscamingue		46.5833°N 78.6667°W
Rale	1965-06-05	248.65	Nord-du-Québec		49.5833°N 74.75°W
Ralleau	1965-06-05	259	Nord-du-Québec		49.0833°N 76.3333°W
Rameau	1920-10-16	101.7	Mont-Alexandre	Gaspésie–Îles-de-la-Madeleine	48.5°N 64.583333333333°W
Ramezay			Saguenay–Lac-Saint-Jean		49°N 72.8333°W
Randin	1965-06-05	435.05	Gaspésie–Îles-de-la-Madeleine		48.5°N 65°W
Rannie	1966-05-14	292.65	Outaouais, Abitibi-Témiscamingue		46.5°N 77.75°W
Raudot	1965-06-05	165.75	Bas-Saint-Laurent		47.9167°N 68.9167°W
Rawdon	1965-06-05	259	Rawdon	Lanaudière	46.0833°N 73.75°W
Raymond	1965-06-05	259	Nord-du-Québec		49.6667°N 79.1667°W
Razilly	1965-06-05	265.95	Nord-du-Québec		49.3333°N 77.8333°W
Reboul	1965-06-05	233.1	Gaspésie–Îles-de-la-Madeleine		48.4167°N 65.5°W
Récher	1965-02-20	251.2	Nord-du-Québec		49.6667°N 79.4167°W
Reclus	1965-06-05	246.05	Abitibi-Témiscamingue		46.75°N 78.8333°W
Rémigny	1920-10-16	231.25	Rémigny	Abitibi-Témiscamingue	47.783333°N 79.2°W
Rémy	1965-06-05	259	Côte-Nord		52.0833°N 68.5°W
Rhé	1966-05-14	119.15	Outaouais, Abitibi-Témiscamingue		46.4167°N 77.6667°W
Rhéaume	1965-12-18	230.5	Mauricie		47.8333°N 73.4167°W
Rhodes	1890-03-01	238.25	La Tuque	Mauricie	47.933333333333°N 72.15°W
Richard	1940-01-27	348	Rivière-Bonjour	Bas-Saint-Laurent	48.733333333333°N 66.333333333333°W
Richardson	1965-02-20	251.2	Nord-du-Québec		50.0833°N 74.1667°W
Rinfret	1965-02-20	248.65	Saguenay–Lac-Saint-Jean, Nord-du-Québec		49.8333°N 73.9167°W
Ripon	1855-05-09	137.6	Ripon	Outaouais	45.75°N 75.1667°W
Risborough	1920-10-16	245.65	Estrie		45.75°N 70.6667°W
Ristigouche	1842-01-01	308	Saint-André-de-Restigouche	Gaspésie–Îles-de-la-Madeleine	48.066666666667°N 66.916666666667°W
Rivard	1918-04-20	182.1	Laurentides		46.25°N 75.3333°W
Robert	1965-02-20	230.5	Eeyou Istchee Baie-James	Nord-du-Québec	49.266666666667°N 74.366666666667°W
Robertson	1892-07-09	302.7	Laurentides		46.5°N 75.6667°W
Roberval	1863-10-03	129.1	Saguenay–Lac-Saint-Jean		48.4167°N 72.3333°W
Robidoux	1917-03-17	384.45	Gaspésie–Îles-de-la-Madeleine		48.3333°N 65.6667°W
Robin	1916-12-16	259	Senneterre	Abitibi-Témiscamingue	48.783333333333°N 76.783333333333°W
Robineau	1965-06-05	259	Côte-Nord		49.1667°N 69°W
Robinson	1916-03-11	288.95	Bas-Saint-Laurent		47.4167°N 68.6667°W
Robitaille	1917-04-21	86.2	Bas-Saint-Laurent		47.9167°N 68.75°W
Rocamadour	1965-06-05	372.95	Côte-Nord		50.4167°N 64.3333°W
Rochebaucourt	1916-12-16	259	Champneuf, La Morandière-Rochebaucourt	Abitibi-Témiscamingue	48.65°N 77.433333°W
Rocheblave	1918-07-20	217.55	Laurentides		46.1667°N 75.3333°W
Rochefort	1966-05-14	259	Lac-Nilgaut	Outaouais	46.5°N 77.083333333333°W
Rochemonteix	1909-02-20	271.15	Côte-Nord		50.3333°N 65.5833°W
Rochon	1920-10-16	118.8	Laurentides		46.5833°N 75.1667°W
Rohault	1965-02-20	95.8	Saguenay–Lac-Saint-Jean; Nord-du-Québec		49.4167°N 74.3333°W
Rolette	1868-10-17	136.4	Saint-Fabien-de-Panet	Chaudière-Appalaches	46.666666666667°N 70.233333333333°W
Rolland	1909-12-24	275.2	Lac-Supérieur	Laurentides	46.35°N 74.483333333333°W
Romieu	1864-07-09	256.5	Cap-Chat; Bas-Saint-Laurent	Gaspésie–Îles-de-la-Madeleine	49°N 66.733330555556°W
Roncevaux	1965-12-18	437.7	Gaspésie–Îles-de-la-Madeleine		48.0833°N 67.5°W
Roquemaure	1916-12-16	259	Abitibi-Témiscamingue		48.6667°N 79.4167°W
Roquemont	1872-04-13	217.55	Capitale-Nationale		47.0833°N 71.9167°W
Ross	1914-03-28	272.75	Sainte-Hedwidge	Saguenay–Lac-Saint-Jean	48.4°N 72.483333°W
Rouillard	1917-05-19	200.3	Bas-Saint-Laurent		47.6667°N 68.5°W
Rouleau	1936-01-11	182.1	Saguenay–Lac-Saint-Jean		48.8333°N 71.3333°W
Rousseau	1940-02-10	256.95	Eeyou Istchee Baie-James	Nord-du-Québec	49.083333°N 79.166666°W
Rousson	1966-05-14	259	Abitibi-Témiscamingue		47.3333°N 76.9167°W
Routhier	1965-06-05	259	Mauricie		48.4167°N 73.9167°W
Roux	1867-07-06	152.5	Saint-Magloire	Chaudière-Appalaches	46.583333333333°N 70.333333333333°W
Rouyn	1916-12-16	259	Rouyn-Noranda	Abitibi-Témiscamingue	48.216666°N 78.983333°W
Roxton	1803-01-08	280.15	Montérégie		45.5°N 72.5°W
Roy	1965-02-20	248.65	Chibougamau	Nord-du-Québec	49.95°N 74.133333333333°W
Royal	1965-02-20	251.2	Eeyou Istchee Baie-James	Nord-du-Québec	49.283333333333°N 75.416666666667°W
Royal-Roussillon	1916-12-16	259	Abitibi-Témiscamingue		48.75°N 79°W
Royer	1904-08-06	248.05	Côte-Nord		49.5°N 67.3333°W
Roz	1965-06-05	259	Rivière-Mouchalagane	Côte-Nord	52.333333°N 68.25°W
Ruette	1965-02-20	259	Eeyou Istchee Baie-James	Nord-du-Québec	49.233333°N 76.316666°W
Ryan	1966-05-14	259	Abitibi-Témiscamingue		47.0833°N 77.3333°W
Sabourin	1920-10-16	259	Abitibi-Témiscamingue		47.9167°N 77.6667°W
Sagard	1919-06-14	218.55	Capitale-Nationale		48.0833°N 70.0833°W
Sagean	1966-05-14	259	Abitibi-Témiscamingue		47.6667°N 76.9167°W
Saguenay	1863-12-19	210.45	Capitale-Nationale		48.0833°N 69.8333°W
Saint-Camille	1859-05-04	70.85	Estrie		45.6667°N 71.75°W
Saint-Castin	1965-06-05	259	Côte-Nord		52.6667°N 67.3333°W
Saint-Denis	1864-03-05	97.5	Saint-Adelme	Bas-Saint-Laurent	48.8°N 67.233333333333°W
Saint-Germains	1870-02-19	186.15	Saguenay–Lac-Saint-Jean		48.4167°N 70.5833°W
Saint-Hilaire	1903-11-28	234.55	Saguenay–Lac-Saint-Jean		48.1667°N 71.8333°W
Saint-Jean	1858-05-08	259	Petit-Saguenay	Saguenay–Lac-Saint-Jean	48.216666°N 70.166666°W
Saint-Lusson	1965-02-20	90.65	Nord-du-Québec		50.9167°N 73°W
Saint-Malo	1966-05-14	287.5	Outaouais		46.75°N 77.5°W
Saint-Maurice	1852-05-29	149.75	Saint-Étienne-des-Grès	Mauricie	46.416666666667°N 72.75°W
Saint-Onge	1940-02-10	372.3	Saguenay–Lac-Saint-Jean		49.1667°N 71.5°W
Saint-Père	1966-05-14	259	Senneterre (ville)	Abitibi-Témiscamingue	48.8°N 76.166666666667°W
Saint-Pierre	1965-02-20	259	Eeyou Istchee Baie-James; Saguenay–Lac-Saint-Jean	Nord-du-Québec	50.716666666667°N 73.25°W
Saint-Pons	1966-05-14	284.9	Outaouais, Abitibi-Témiscamingue		46.75°N 77.75°W
Saint-Simon	1965-02-20	259	Eeyou Istchee Baie-James	Nord-du-Québec	50.733333333333°N 73.45°W
Saint-Vincent	1908-03-04	259	Côte-Nord-du-Golfe-du-Saint-Laurent	Côte-Nord	50.6°N 59.516666666667°W
Sainte-Hélène	1965-02-20	97.5	Eeyou Istchee Baie-James	Nord-du-Québec	49.8°N 78.316666666667°W
Saintes	1965-06-05	259	Bas-Saint-Laurent		48.8333°N 67.25°W
Salières	1965-06-05	259	Saguenay–Lac-Saint-Jean		50°N 73°W
Sarrasin	1965-06-05	259	Saguenay–Lac-Saint-Jean		49.8333°N 73.6667°W
Saussure	1965-02-20	173.2	Eeyou Istchee Baie-James	Nord-du-Québec	49.8°N 75.45°W
Sauvageau	1965-06-05	259	Côte-Nord		51.6667°N 68.75°W
Sauvé	1965-06-05	282.45	Nord-du-Québec		49.4167°N 78.3333°W
Sbarretti	1966-05-14	259	Outaouais		47.0833°N 76.75°W
Scott	1965-02-20	246.05	Eeyou Istchee Baie-James	Nord-du-Québec	49.816666666667°N 74.583333333333°W
Sébille	1966-05-14	250.9	Abitibi-Témiscamingue		46.5833°N 78.5°W
Seignelay	1965-06-05	259	Côte-Nord		52.25°N 69°W
Sénécal	1965-06-05	259	Rivière-Mouchalagane	Côte-Nord	51.75°N 69.416666°W
Senezergues	1965-06-05	259	Abitibi-Témiscamingue		46.9167°N 78.5°W
Senneterre	1965-06-05	259	Abitibi-Témiscamingue		48.3333°N 77.25°W
Senneville	1965-06-05	259	Abitibi-Témiscamingue		48.1667°N 77.6667°W
Sérigny	1966-05-14	259	Abitibi-Témiscamingue		48.25°N 76.3333°W
Settrington	1822-06-03	134.65	Saint-Hilarion	Capitale-Nationale	47.583333°N 70.416666°W
Sevestre	1965-06-05	259	Rivière-Mouchalagane	Côte-Nord	52.5°N 68.083333°W
Shawinigan	1848-09-23	157.8	Mauricie		46.5°N 72.8333°W
Sheen	1849-05-19	210.45	Sheenboro	Outaouais	46.05°N 77.183333333333°W
Shefford	1801-02-10	259	Montérégie		45.4167°N 72.5833°W
Shehyn	1920-10-16	273.2	Abitibi-Témiscamingue		47°N 79.0833°W
Shenley	1810-05-01	250.55	Chaudière-Appalaches		46°N 70.8333°W
Sherrington	1809-02-22	188.85	Montérégie		45.25°N 73.5°W
Shipton	1801-12-04	178.05	Estrie		45.75°N 72°W
Sicotte	1865-01-21	207.2	Grand-Remous	Outaouais	46.633333°N 75.85°W
Signay	1866-04-28	123.4	Saguenay–Lac-Saint-Jean		48.5°N 71.75°W
Silly	1966-05-14	259	Abitibi-Témiscamingue		47.3333°N 77.75°W
Silvy	1936-01-11	227.85	Saguenay–Lac-Saint-Jean		48.5833°N 70.5833°W
Simard	1850-10-12	220.55	Saguenay–Lac-Saint-Jean		48.5°N 71.1667°W
Simpson	1802-07-17	279.2	Drummondville	Centre-du-Québec	45.916666°N 72.333333°W
Sincennes	1965-12-18	324	Lac-Normand	Mauricie	47.48333333°N 73.91666667°W
Sirois	1936-01-11	325.35	Gaspésie–Îles-de-la-Madeleine		48.75°N 65.1667°W
Soissons	1965-02-20	261.6	Nord-du-Québec		49.25°N 77.9167°W
Somerset	1804-04-21	213.9	Notre-Dame-de-Lourdes	Centre-du-Québec	46.283333333333°N 71.75°W
Souart	1966-05-14	215.95	Abitibi-Témiscamingue, Nord-du-Québec		48.9167°N 75.9167°W
Spalding	1868-05-16	186.15	Estrie		45.6667°N 70.75°W
Stagni	1965-06-05	259	Rivière-Mouchalagane	Côte-Nord	52.083333°N 67.166666°W
Stanbridge	1801-09-01	240.85	Stanbridge East	Montérégie	45.15°N 72.983333333333°W
Standon	1831-04-27	71.65	Chaudière-Appalaches		46.5°N 70.5833°W
Stanfold	1807-07-08	290.45	Mauricie		46.1667°N 71.9167°W
Stanstead	1800-09-27	315.15	Estrie		45.0833°N 72.0833°W
Stoke	1802-02-13	287.25	Stoke	Estrie	45.5833°N 71.8333°W
Stoneham	1800-05-04	272.7	Stoneham-et-Tewkesbury	Capitale-Nationale	47.166666666667°N 71.5°W
Stratford	1856-12-04	206.4	Chaudière-Appalaches		45.8333°N 71.25°W
Stukely	1800-11-03	255	Eastman	Estrie	45.383333333333°N 72.333333333333°W
Subercase	1965-06-05	235.7	Nord-du-Québec		49.9167°N 78.3333°W
Suffolk	1874-05-30	165.9	Saint-Émile-de-Suffolk	Outaouais	45.916666666667°N 74.933333333333°W
Sulte	1965-06-05	259	La Tuque	Mauricie	48.266666°N 74.983333°W
Sureau	1966-05-14	220.15	Réservoir-Dozois	Abitibi-Témiscamingue	47.516666666667°N 77.116666666667°W
Surimau	1920-10-16	259	Abitibi-Témiscamingue		48.0833°N 78.3333°W
Surveyer	1965-06-05	259	Côte-Nord		52.25°N 68.25°W
Sutton	1802-08-31	271.95	Sutton	Montérégie	45.0833°N 72.6667°W
Suzor	1965-12-18	259	La Tuque	Mauricie	47.983333°N 74.333333°W
Sydenham	1842	287.85	Gaspésie–Îles-de-la-Madeleine		49.0833°N 64.6667°W
Tabaret	1920-10-16	167.85	Abitibi-Témiscamingue		46.9167°N 79.25°W
Taché	1883-04-24	164.7	Saguenay–Lac-Saint-Jean		48.5833°N 71.5°W
Tadoussac	1855-04-24	137.6	Côte-Nord		48.25°N 69.6667°W
Taillon	1916-06-24	234.7	Saguenay–Lac-Saint-Jean		48.75°N 71.9167°W
Talon	1920-10-04	244	Sainte-Lucie-de-Beauregard	Chaudière-Appalaches	46.733333333333°N 70.083333333333°W
Tanguay	1903-06-20	186.15	Saguenay–Lac-Saint-Jean		49.1667°N 71.8333°W
Tardivel	1965-06-05	282.3	Côte-Nord		51.75°N 61.1667°W
Tarte	1965-12-18	253.8	Mauricie		48.0833°N 73.9167°W
Taschereau	1920-10-16	154.5	Gaspésie–Îles-de-la-Madeleine		49.25°N 65.5°W
Tassé	1965-06-05	259	Mauricie		48.0833°N 74.75°W
Tavernier	1916-12-16	247.25	Abitibi-Témiscamingue		48.25°N 77°W
Tekakwitha	1965-06-05	259	Nord-du-Québec		50.8333°N 77.25°W
Tellier	1920-10-16	174.35	Lanaudière		46.4167°N 74.0833°W
Templeton	1807-03-26	300	Outaouais		45.5833°N 75.6667°W
Ternet	1965-06-05	207.2	Côte-Nord		50.25°N 63.5833°W
Tessier	1864-03-12	105.2	Bas-Saint-Laurent		48.75°N 67.3333°W
Têtu	1842-01-01	310.8	Côte-Nord		50.4167°N 63.1667°W
Tewkesbury	1800-05-14	277.6	Capitale-Nationale		47.25°N 71.5°W
Théberge	1965-06-05	259	Saguenay–Lac-Saint-Jean		49.4167°N 73.5°W
Thémines	1965-02-20	259	Eeyou Istchee Baie-James	Nord-du-Québec	49.083333°N 77.45°W
Thetford	1802-11-10	249.3	Chaudière-Appalaches		46.0833°N 71.1667°W
Thibaudeau	1965-05-06	251.75	Saguenay–Lac-Saint-Jean; Nord-du-Québec		50°N 73.6667°W
Thorne	1861-05-25	155.1	Thorne	Outaouais	45.75°N 76.4167°W
Thury	1965-06-05	259	Rivière-Mouchalagane	Côte-Nord	52.366666666667°N 67.8°W
Tiblemont	1916-12-16	226.5	Abitibi-Témiscamingue		48.1667°N 77.25°W
Tilly	1965-06-05	259	Côte-Nord		52.0833°N 67.8333°W
Tingwick	1802-07-17	258.2	Warwick; Mauricie	Mauricie–Bois-Francs	45.916666°N 71.916666°W
Tonnancour	1916-12-16	224.6	Senneterre (ville)	Abitibi-Témiscamingue	48.916666°N 77°W
Tonty	1920-10-16	242.4	Linton	Capitale-Nationale	47.166666°N 72.05°W
Tortellier	1965-06-05	238.25	Côte-Nord		51.9167°N 69°W
Touraine		228.65	Abitibi-Témiscamingue		47.0833°N 78°W
Tourelle	1868-10-17	254.95	Gaspésie–Îles-de-la-Madeleine		49.0833°N 66.3333°W
Tourouvre	1906-06-16	151.35	Mauricie		47.75°N 72.8333°W
Toussaint	1906-06-16	246.05	La Tuque	Mauricie	48.7°N 74.983333°W
Touzel	1965-06-05	344.45	Côte-Nord		50.4167°N 64.8333°W
Tracy	1920-10-16	176.1	Lanaudière		46.4167°N 73.8333°W
Trécesson	1916-12-16	259	Trécesson	Abitibi-Témiscamingue	48.65°N 78.316666°W
Tremblay	1848-10-14	175.65	Saguenay–Lac-Saint-Jean		48.5°N 71°W
Tresny	1965-06-05	261.6	Saguenay–Lac-Saint-Jean		50.1667°N 73.25°W
Trévet	1965-06-05	259	Abitibi-Témiscamingue		48.25°N 76.1667°W
Tring	1804-07-20	248.45	Saint-Victor	Chaudière-Appalaches	46.116666°N 70.966666°W
Trouvé	1966-05-14	264.15	Outaouais		46.9167°N 77.75°W
Troyes	1966-05-14	326.35	Baie-de-la-Bouteille	Lanaudière	47.166666°N 74.133333°W
Trudel	1889-04-05	238.25	Mauricie		47.5833°N 72.3333°W
Turcotte	1868-05-23	306.75	Mauricie		47.3333°N 72.9167°W
Turgeon	1900-06-02	179.85	Rivière-Rouge	Laurentides	46.5°N 75°W
Turgis	1965-02-26	251.2	Nord-du-Québec		50.25°N 75.25°W
Turquetil	1966-05-14	259	Lac-Pythonga	Outaouais	47.083333°N 76.45°W
Upton	1800-05-21	271.95	Mauricie; Montérégie		45.9167°N 72.6667°W
Urban	1965-02-20	282.3	Eeyou Istchee Baie-James	Nord-du-Québec	49.083333333333°N 75.65°W
Urfé	1965-06-05	259	Nord-du-Québec		49.9167°N 76.5°W
Vachon	1965-02-20	401.45	Nord-du-Québec		50.8333°N 73.4167°W
Valets	1965-02-20	259	Senneterre (ville)	Abitibi-Témiscamingue	48.5°N 76.583333°W
Vallée	1940-01-27	284.9	Nord-du-Québec		48.3333°N 66.6667°W
Vallières	1868-08-01	129.5	Nord-du-Québec		47.4167°N 72.8333°W
Valmy	1966-05-14	233.8	Nord-du-Québec		48.3333°N 76.1667°W
Valois	1965-06-05	240.85	Nord-du-Québec		51.6667°N 69°W
Valrennes	1965-02-20	259	Nord-du-Québec		49.5°N 78.5°W
Vanier	1940-02-10	259	Nord-du-Québec		49.0833°N 78.75°W
Varin	1924-10-18	117.35	Nord-du-Québec		48.1667°N 68.3333°W
Vassal	1916-12-16	259	Nord-du-Québec		48.75°N 77.6667°W
Vassan	1916-12-16	256.4	Nord-du-Québec		48.1667°N 77.8333°W
Vasson	1966-05-14	246.05	Nord-du-Québec		48.3333°N 75.9167°W
Vaudray	1920-10-16	259	Nord-du-Québec		48.0833°N 78.75°W
Vauquelin	1965-02-20	264.2	Nord-du-Québec		48.0833°N 77.25°W
Ventadour	1965-05-06	259	Nord-du-Québec; Saguenay–Lac-Saint-Jean; Mauricie		49°N 74.3333°W
Verneuil	1965-02-20	259	Eeyou Istchee Baie-James	Nord-du-Québec	49.083333333333°N 76.766666666667°W
Verrazzano	1965-06-05	225.35	Nord-du-Québec		51.3333°N 58.75°W
Verreau	1965-06-05	259	Nord-du-Québec		48.8333°N 74.5833°W
Vezza	1965-02-20	259	Nord-du-Québec		49.5°N 77.9167°W
Viel	1966-06-08	248.65	Laurentides; Lanaudière		46.6667°N 74.6667°W
Vienne	1965-02-20	251.25	Eeyou Istchee Baie-James	Nord-du-Québec	50.083333055556°N 74.583333055556°W
Vieux-Pont	1965-05-06	259	Côte-Nord		52.8333°N 67.8333°W
Viger	1861-06-15	199.1	Nord-du-Québec		47.9167°N 69.3333°W
Vignal	1965-02-20	259	Eeyou Istchee Baie-James	Nord-du-Québec	49.666666666667°N 76.766666666667°W
Vigneau	1965-06-05	259	Nord-du-Québec		50.4167°N 63.5833°W
Villars	1920-10-16	326.35	Nord-du-Québec		47.6667°N 79.0833°W
Villebon	1965-02-20	259	Nord-du-Québec		47.9167°N 77.25°W
Villedieu	1966-05-14	257.7	Nord-du-Québec		46.75°N 78.5°W
Villedonné	1966-05-14	261.6	Nord-du-Québec		47.3333°N 77.0833°W
Villejouin	1965-06-05	253.8	Nord-du-Québec		49.1667°N 69.25°W
Villemontel	1916-12-16	253.8	Sainte-Gertrude-Manneville	Abitibi-Témiscamingue	48.5°N 78.333333°W
Villeneuve	1873-02-22	222.55	Val-des-Bois	Outaouais	45.916666666667°N 75.5°W
Villeray	1965-06-05	261.6	Rivière-Mouchalagane	Côte-Nord	51.666666°N 67.333333°W
Villiers		238.75	Baie-de-la-Bouteille	Lanaudière	47.033333333333°N 73.933333333333°W
Villieu	1965-06-05	259	Nord-du-Québec		50.0833°N 77.6667°W
Vimont	1965-02-20	163.15	Nord-du-Québec		49.6667°N 73.9167°W
Vimy	1965-06-05	259	Nord-du-Québec		47.9167°N 76.3333°W
Virot	1965-06-05	259	Nord-du-Québec		49.1667°N 69.5°W
Vondenvelden	1936-01-11	341.95	Nord-du-Québec		48.5833°N 65.1667°W
Voyer	1966-06-08	256.4	Eeyou Istchee Baie-James	Nord-du-Québec	50.233333333333°N 75.866666666667°W
Wabassee	1914-11-14	169.95	Nord-du-Québec		46.25°N 75.75°W
Wakefield	1843-06-15	250.9	Nord-du-Québec		45.6667°N 75.8333°W
Walbank	1936-01-11	220.15	Mont-Albert	Gaspésie–Îles-de-la-Madeleine	48.75°N 65.583333°W
Waltham	1849-02-24	155.6	Waltham	Outaouais	45.95°N 76.916666666667°W
Ware	1835-08-20	156.8	Lac-Etchemin	Chaudière-Appalaches	46.416666°N 70.466666°W
Warwick	1804-01-23	258.2	Warwick	Mauricie–Bois-Francs	45.983333333333°N 72.066666666667°W
Watford	1864-03-26	310.4	Sainte-Rose-de-Watford	Chaudière-Appalaches	46.25°N 70.416666°W
Weedon	1822-02-28	259.1	Estrie		45.7°N 71.45°W
Weir	1904-02-20	178.8	Nord-du-Québec		48.3333°N 65.0833°W
Wells	1892-10-29	205.6	Notre-Dame-du-Laus	Laurentides	46.05°N 75.5°W
Wendover	1805-06-24	202.35	Nord-du-Québec		45.9167°N 72.5°W
Wentworth	1809-06-03	249.3	Nord-du-Québec		45.75°N 74.4167°W
Westbury	1804-03-13	69.9	Nord-du-Québec		45.5°N 71.6667°W
Wexford	1852-02-28	259	Laurentides; Lanaudière		46.0833°N 74.1667°W
Weymontachingue	1899-01-07	238.75	Nord-du-Québec		48°N 73.75°W
Whitton	1848-03-04	297.45	Nantes	Estrie	45.666666666667°N 71°W
Whitworth	1848-03-04	263.5	Nord-du-Québec		47.75°N 69.3333°W
Wickham	1802-08-31	256.55	Montérégie; Mauricie		45.75°N 72.4167°W
Wilson	1965-02-20	259	Eeyou Istchee Baie-James	Nord-du-Québec	49.083333333333°N 76.55°W
Windsor	1802-07-04	318.55	Val-Joli	Estrie	45.666666666667°N 71.833333333333°W
Winslow	1859-04-22	295.4	Stornoway	Estrie	45.666666666667°N 71.166666666667°W
Woburn	1867-06-15	161.85	Saint-Augustin-de-Woburn	Estrie	45.333333333333°N 70.916666666667°W
Wolfe	1885-10-10	220.55	Nord-du-Québec		46.0833°N 74.5°W
Wolfestown	1802-08-14	249.3	Chaudière-Appalaches; Mauricie		45.9167°N 71.5833°W
Woodbridge	1840-05-02	193.05	Nord-du-Québec		47.5°N 69.75°W
Wotton	1849-06-09	192.2	Nord-du-Québec		45.75°N 71.75°W
Wright	1854-11-11	149.75	Gracefield	Outaouais	46.083333333333°N 76.083333333333°W
Würtele	1936-01-11	80.95	Nord-du-Québec		46.6667°N 75.4167°W
Yeo	1966-05-14	259	Nord-du-Québec		47.3333°N 77.3333°W
York	1842-01-01	186.15	Gaspé	Gaspésie–Îles-de-la-Madeleine	48.75°N 64.533333333333°W
Youville	1965-06-05	214.97	Nord-du-Québec		49.5833°N 72.5833°W
Ypres	1965-02-20	264.18	Senneterre (ville)	Abitibi-Témiscamingue	47.916666666667°N 76.833333333333°W

== See also ==
- List of township municipalities in Quebec
- List of united township municipalities in Quebec
