= List of Anglo-Quebecer communities =

This is a list of municipalities in the Canadian province of Quebec where Anglo-Quebecer populations form over 35% of the total population. Anglo-Quebecers, for the purposes of this list, are individuals who have English as a first language, including those with multiple first languages. As such, the list does not include those who primarily use English but for whom it is not a first language.

The anglophone community in Quebec is centred primarily in the Greater Montreal, Montérégie, Outaouais and Estrie regions, but there are smaller pockets of anglophone settlement throughout the province. Most Anglo-Quebecers live in communities with significant numbers of other Anglo-Quebecers but where they do not form a majority, such as Chateauguay, Montreal. Not included in this list are demographically significant Native reserves that predominantly speak English, like Kahnawake, because the census has insufficient data on these communities because of political conflicts between the First Nations and the state.

== 50% or more ==
- 541 Gros-Mécatina (95.6%)
- 140 Sheenboro (95%)
- 794 Bonne-Espérance (94.6%)
- 549 Saint-Augustin (91.6%)
- 1300 Shawville (87%)
- 338 Chichester (87%)
- 345 Thorne (81.2%)
- 1010 Clarendon (81%)
- 968 Bristol (80%)
- 225 Brome (80%)
- 225 Portage-du-Fort (80%)
- 1,120 L'Isle-aux-Allumettes (77.8%)
- 460 Grosse-Île in the Magdalen Islands (75%)
- 184 Alleyn-et-Cawood (74%)
- 345 Litchfield (71.9%)
- 555 Harrington (71.6%)
- 1,015 Côte-Nord-du-Golfe-du-Saint-Laurent (71%)
- 928 Blanc-Sablon (70.7%)
- 1785 Stanstead (61%)
- 250 Waltham (69%)
- 3,430 Montreal West (66%)
- 3,365 Hudson (66%)
- 741 Cascapédia–Saint-Jules (63.5%)
- 820 New Carlisle (63%)
- 370 North Hatley (60.1%)
- 4,260 Hampstead (61%)
- 2,360 Baie-d'Urfé (61%)
- 270 Elgin (59%)
- 100 Rapides-des-Joachims (59%)
- 16,435 Pointe-Claire (55%)
- 525 Senneville (55%)
- 395 Campbell's Bay (54.5%)
- 10,720 Westmount (54%)
- 261 Wentworth (54%)
- 10,155 Beaconsfield (53%)
- 2,435 Lennoxville (53%)
- 540 Ayer's Cliff (52%)
- 605 Très-Saint-Sacrement (50%)
- 29,675 Dollard-des-Ormeaux (60%)

== 40–49 % ==
- 890 Potton (49.9%)
- 415 Kazabazua (49.4%)
- 410 Stanbridge East (49.4%)
- 477 Otter Lake (49%)
- 345 West Bolton (48.3%)
- 465 Low (48.7%)
- 370 Ogden (48.7%)
- 2,575 Brome Lake (47%)
- 3,500 Chelsea (46%)
- 285 Bryson (46%)
- 8,085 Dorval (45%)
- 9,185 Kirkland (45%)
- 13,515 Côte Saint-Luc (45%)
- 1,065 Hinchinbrooke (45%)
- 315 Hemmingford Village (42%)
- 735 Hemmingford Township (42%)
- 295 Bolton-Est (41.8%)

== 35–39 % ==
- 2070 Pontiac (39.9%)
- 1,860 Sainte-Anne-de-Bellevue (39%)
- 965 Huntingdon (38%)
- 2765 La Pêche (37.4%)
- 230 Arundel (37%)
- 210 Barnston-Ouest (36.2%)
- 6,165 Saint-Lazare (36%)
- 555 Gore (36%)
- 155 Dundee (36%)
- 105 Stanbridge Station (35.6%)
- 215 Denholm (35.5%)
- 385 Melbourne (35.2%)
- 19,115 Pierrefonds (35%)
- 3,905 Pincourt (35%)
