= Quebec Route 303 =

Highway in Quebec, Canada

Route 303

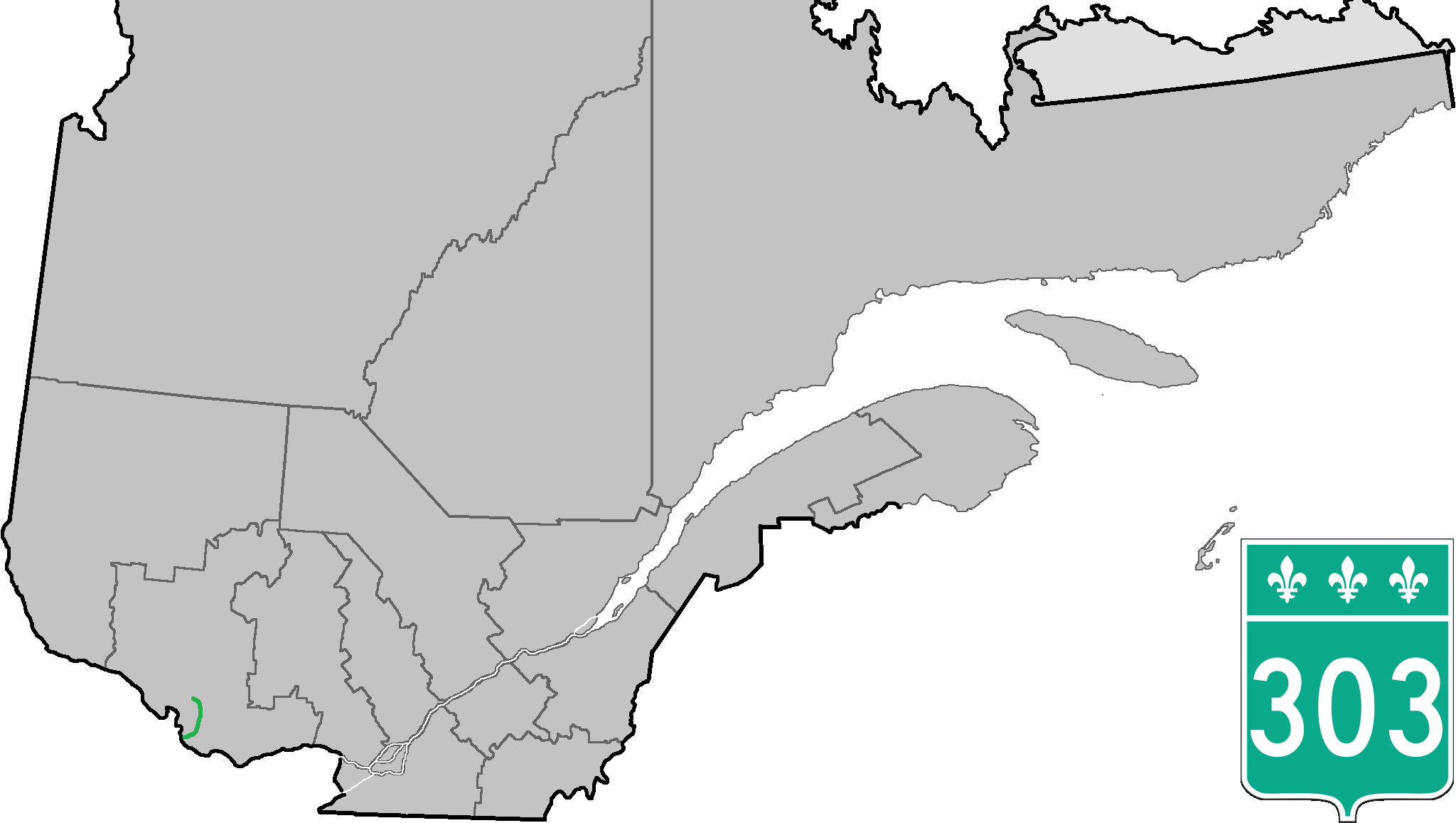

Route information
- Maintained by Transports Québec
- Length: 50.1 km (31.1 mi)

Major junctions
- South end: R-301 in Portage-du-Fort
- R-148 in Clarendon; R-366 in Ladysmith (Thorne)
- North end: R-301 in Otter Lake

Location
- Country: Canada
- Province: Quebec

Highway system
- Quebec provincial highways; Autoroutes; List; Former
| ← R-301 | → R-307 |

Route 303 is provincial secondary highway located in the Outaouais region in western Quebec. The 47-kilometer route in the Pontiac County runs from Portage-du-Fort (near the Ontario-Quebec crossing towards Renfrew County) towards Otter Lake at the junction of Route 301.

== Municipalities along Highway 303 ==
- Portage-du-Fort
- Clarendon
- Shawville
- Thorne
- Otter Lake

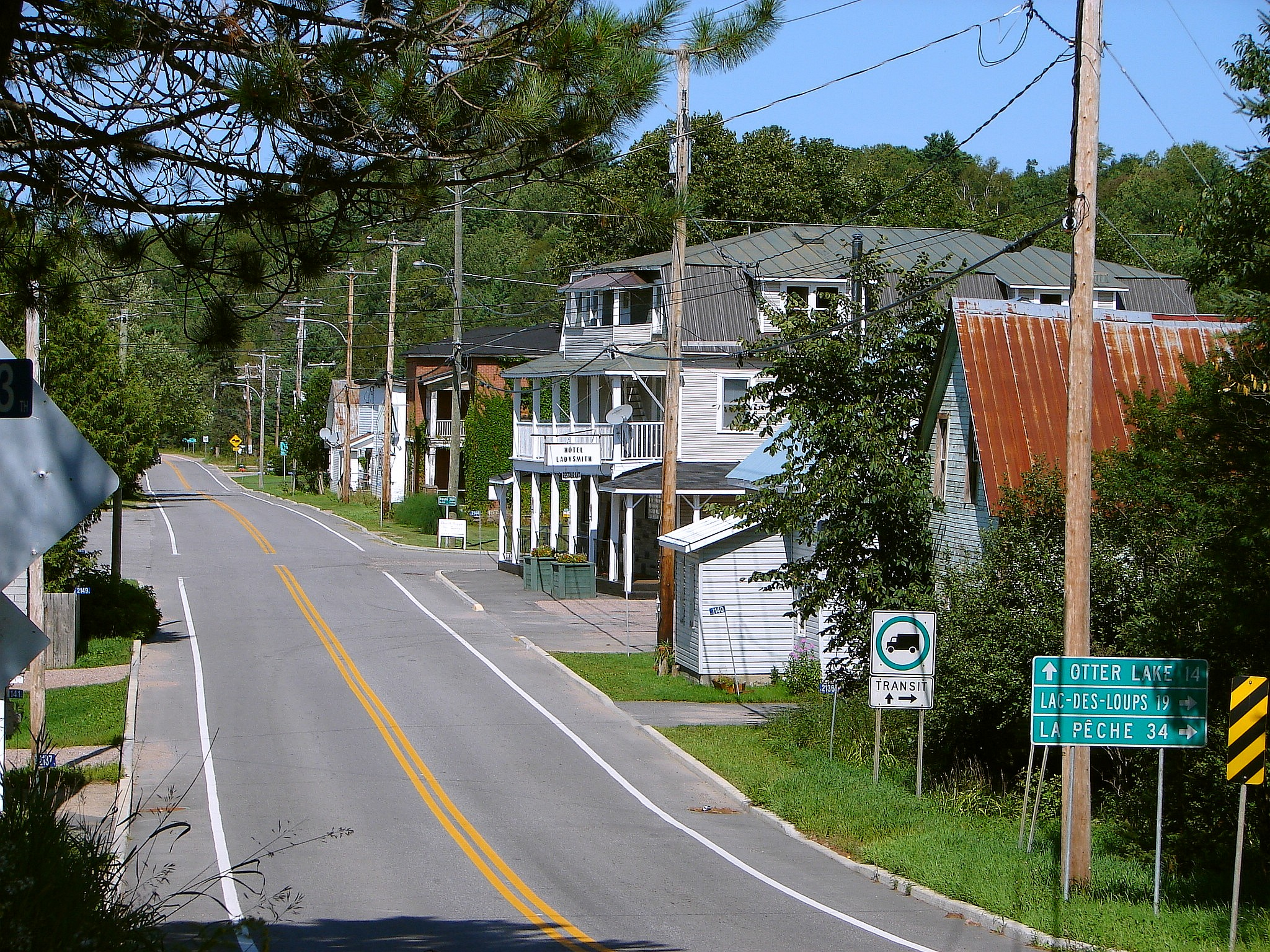
Route 303 in Ladysmith (Thorne).

== Major intersections ==
| RCM or ET | Municipality | Km | Junction | Notes |
|---|---|---|---|---|
Southern terminus of Route 303
| Pontiac | Portage-du-Fort | 0.0 | R-301 | 301 SOUTH: to Highway 653 Ontario; 301 NORTH: to Litchfield |
| Pontiac | Clarendon | 13.7; 15.1 | R-148 (Overlap 1.4 km) | 148 WEST: to Litchfield; 148 EAST: to Bristol |
| Pontiac | Ladysmith | 36.5 | R-366 | 366 WEST: to Thorne; 366 EAST: to La Pêche |
| Pontiac | Otter Lake | 50.1 | R-301 | 301 SOUTH: to Thorne; 301 NORTH: to Alleyn-et-Cawood |
Northern terminus of Route 303

== See also ==
- List of Quebec provincial highways
