= 2010 Central Canada earthquake =

- Location within Quebec
- UTC time: 2010-06-23 17:41:42
- ISC event: 14782739
- USGS-ANSS: ComCat
- Local date: 23 June 2010
- Local time: 1:41 PM (EDT)
- Duration: 30 seconds
- Magnitude: 5.0 M_{w}
- Depth: 16.4 km (10 mi)
- Epicenter: 45.904°N 75.497°W
- Type: Reverse
- Areas affected: Quebec, Canada; Ontario, Canada; New York, United States
- Max. intensity: MMI VI (Strong)
- Casualties: 1 injured

The 2010 Central Canada earthquake occurred with a moment magnitude of 5.0 in Central Canada on 23 June at about 13:41:41 EDT and lasted about 30 seconds. The epicentre was situated approximately 56 kilometres (35 mi) north of Ottawa, Ontario, in the municipality of Val-des-Bois, Quebec. Canada's capital, Ottawa, declared this earthquake as being its most powerful in 65 years.

It was felt across most of Ontario and Quebec, as well as parts of the northeastern United States, in addition to places as far as Chicago, Pittsburgh, Baltimore, Charleston, West Virginia, and Halifax. It was the first moderate earthquake associated with the Western Quebec Seismic Zone since 20 April 2002, when the area was affected by magnitude 5.1 M_{w} tremors. Southern Ontario was also affected by the 1998 magnitude 5.2 M_{w} Pymatuning earthquake, associated with a different seismic region (Southern Great Lakes seismic zone).

Although a 5.0 magnitude quake is considered to be moderate, the earthquake's depth (estimates of which vary between 16.4 kilometres (10.2 mi) and 19.0 kilometres (11.8 mi)) meant that its effects were more widely felt.

== Geology ==
The magnitude 5.0 M_{w} intraplate earthquake occurred near the southern edge of the Western Quebec Seismic Zone, known for frequent, but minor tremors, occurring, on average, every five days. Far away from the North American tectonic plate's margin, the regional seismicity is controlled by a series of geologic faults formed over the last billion years by the processes of mountain building, including the Grenville orogeny, and subsequent erosion. The processes causing the earthquakes in the zone are not well understood: the tremors are not linked to particular seismogenic structures, nor are the sources of stress definitively identified. The initial focal mechanism of the 2010 earthquake suggests reverse faulting on a fault trending southeast–northwest. However, the size and depth of this earthquake make it uncertain whether the causative fault can be identified.

Earthquakes of magnitude 4.5 or greater are fairly infrequent in the area, occurring at a rate of a few per decade. Some studies suggest, however, that larger earthquakes of magnitude around 7 may have occurred 4550 and 7060 years BP.

== Earthquake ==
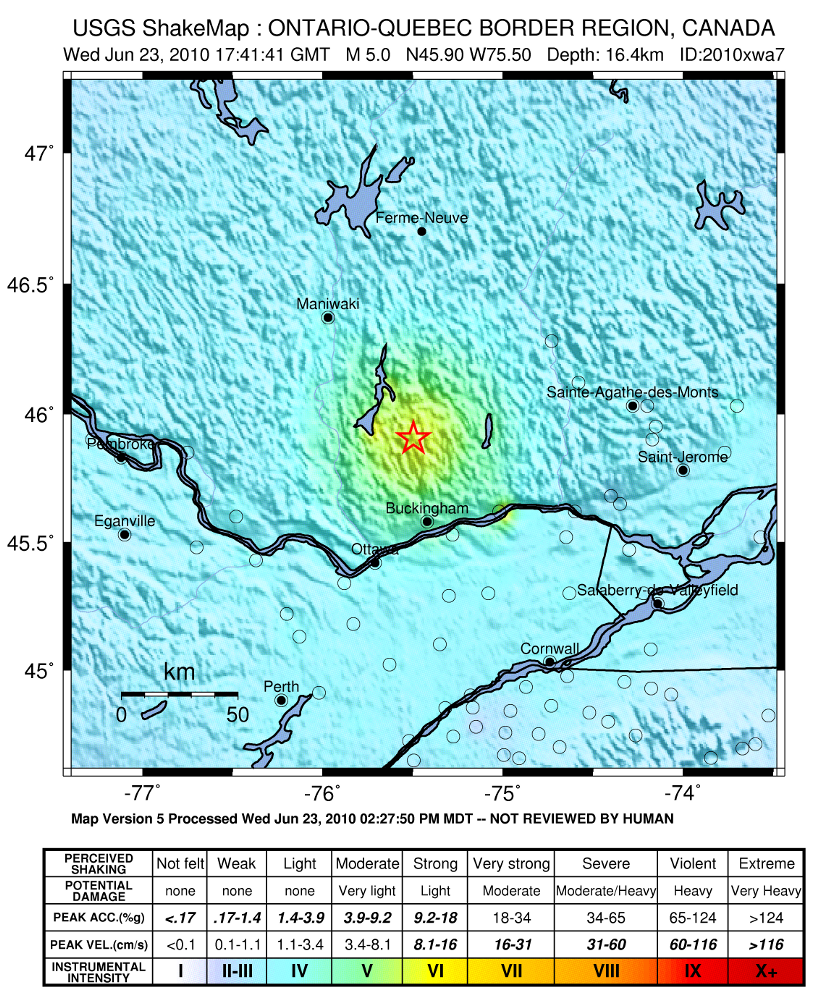
USGS ShakeMap for the event

The Globe and Mail reported that "Twitter users as distant as Springfield, Massachusetts, Traverse City, Michigan, and Cincinnati, Ohio reported feeling tremors." The blogosphere and other social media sites like Facebook were swamped by posts referring to the "2010 Ottawa earthquake" or the "2010 Toronto earthquake". Places all the way southward to New Jersey reported a disruptive tremor.

This earthquake occurred as Canadian environment minister Jim Prentice was conducting an interview in Ottawa, and he reported that his chair started to move. The offices of The Globe and Mail were evacuated soon after the tremor. Several media outlets also aired video of a press conference by New Democratic Party Member of Parliament Don Davies being disrupted by the quake.

=== Damage ===
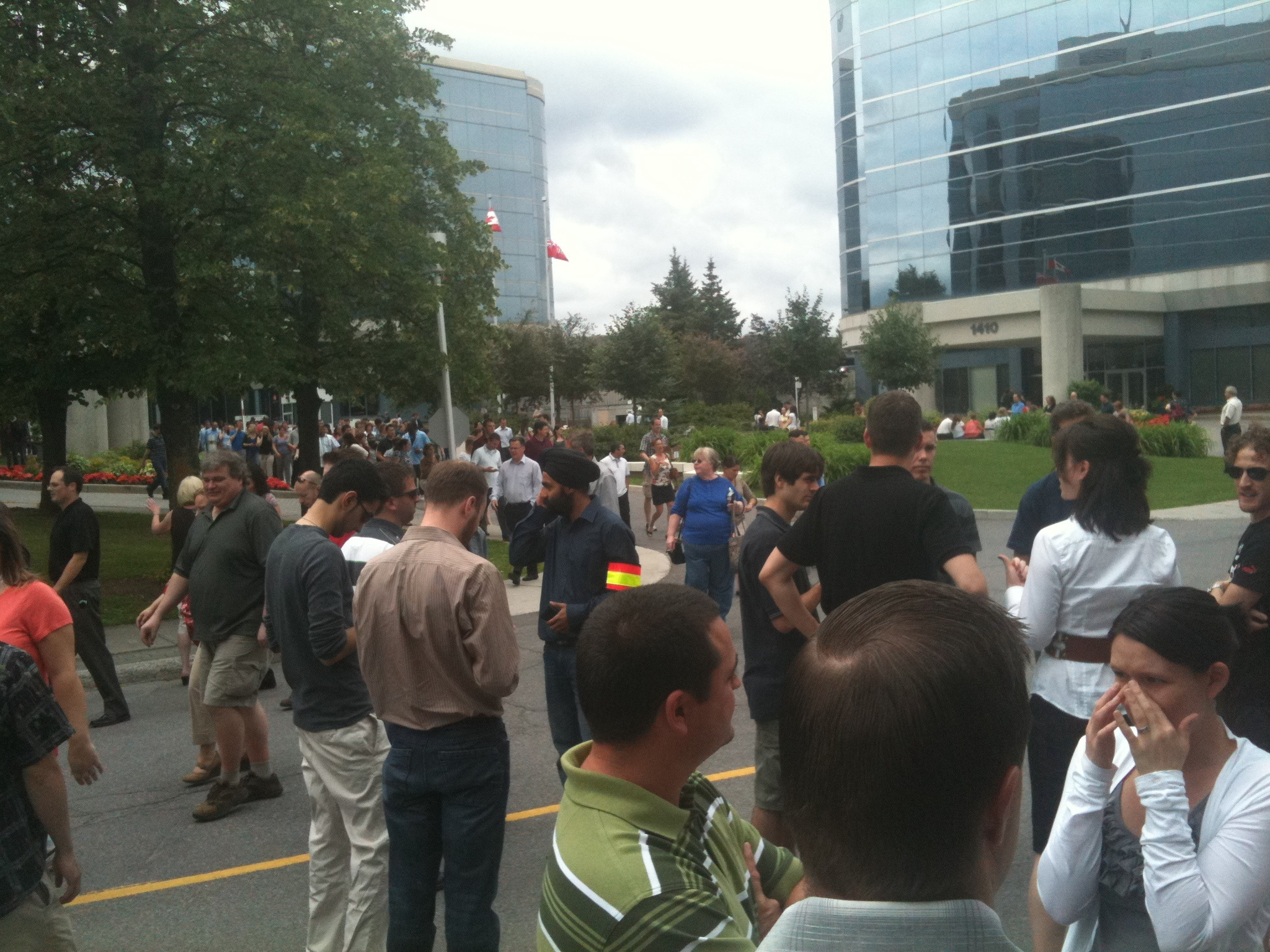
Office building evacuation in Ottawa

Part of Quebec Route 307 was closed due to a partial bridge collapse near Bowman that injured a nearby fisherman. Near the epicentre, many of the telephone networks were out. The Ottawa-Carleton District School Board evacuated most of its schools, but students were allowed to return when the situation was determined to be safe. A number of schools were damaged, including First Avenue Public School, Churchill Alternative School, Blossom Park Public School, Centennial Public School, Connaught Public School, Elgin Street Public School and Hilson Avenue Public School. In Gracefield, Quebec, a state of emergency was declared after several buildings were damaged, including the church, some of the city's administration buildings and a hotel. In the Outaouais, about 1,300 homes lost power. The O-Train Trillium Line in Ottawa was shut down until 5 pm, and the Agence métropolitaine de transport shut down four of five commuter trains in Montreal for a similar period of time in order for lines to be inspected.

Immediately after the quake, cell phone service in Ottawa was down, possibly overloaded by callers. Several windows in Ottawa City Hall shattered, and a chimney in a nearby solicitors' office collapsed. Minor damage was also reported to several city-owned facilities, including two branches of the Ottawa Public Library and two municipal sports arenas, and power was out in part of the downtown Golden Triangle neighbourhood. Office buildings in Ottawa and Toronto were evacuated, and cracks appeared in the Parliamentary Press Gallery building on Parliament Hill. A session of the Senate of Canada was also interrupted, leading to an unprecedented session of the Senate outside on the front lawn of Parliament Hill, in order that a formal adjournment for the day could take place. No serious damage or injuries were reported. In Toronto, Toronto Transit Commission and GO Transit service was uninterrupted, while eastbound Via Rail trains were significantly delayed.

=== Aftershocks ===
On 16 March 2011, a magnitude 3.7 or possibly 4.3 aftershock struck Hawkesbury, Ontario, on the Ottawa River Valley and southwest of the initial magnitude 5.0 epicentre. It was felt in places including Ottawa, Montreal and St. Albans, VT.

== See also ==
- List of earthquakes in 2010
- List of earthquakes in Canada
