= Baxter Bowman =

Canadian politician (1814–1853)

Baxter Bowman (before 1814 – December 13, 1853) was a businessman and political figure in Lower Canada, who operated a gristmill and a number of sawmills on the du Lièvre.

Bowman was a lumber merchant based in Buckingham, Lower Canada who held cutting rights on the du Lièvre River and the upper Ottawa River. At one time, the legendary French-Canadian lumberjack Joseph Montferrand worked for Bowman on the upper Ottawa. Bowman was a justice of the peace for the region and also served as a captain in the local militia. He was a member of the Legislative Assembly of Lower Canada for Ottawa County from November 22, 1834 to March 27, 1838.

He died in Buckingham in 1853 and was buried at Meredith, New Hampshire.

His sawmills on the Lièvre were later purchased by James Maclaren and others in 1864. The municipality of Bowman on the du Lièvre River took its name from Baxter Bowman.
