= Quebec Route 307 =

Highway in Quebec, Canada

Route 307

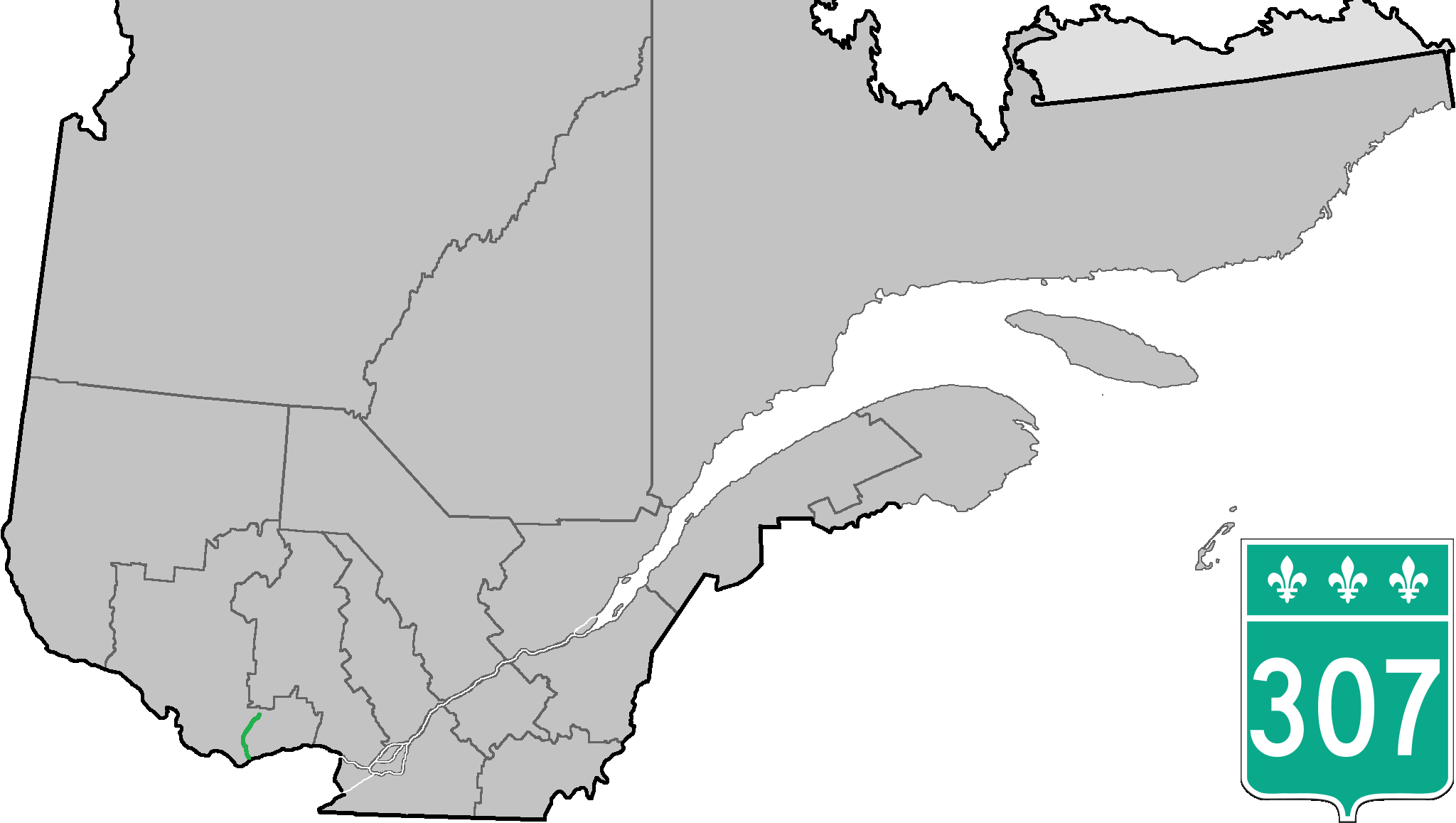

Route information
- Maintained by Transports Québec
- Length: 67.0 km (41.6 mi)

Major junctions
- South end: A-50 in Gatineau
- R-366 in Val-des-Monts
- North end: R-309 in Val-des-Bois

Location
- Country: Canada
- Province: Quebec
- Major cities: Gatineau, Cantley, Val-des-Monts

Highway system
- Quebec provincial highways; Autoroutes; List; Former
← R-303	→ R-309

Route 307 is a provincial road located in the Outaouais region of Quebec. The road runs mostly parallel to the Gatineau River on the eastern side of it. It starts at the corner of Rue Saint-Louis and Boulevard Greber in the Gatineau sector of the city of Gatineau. It runs north of Gatineau and ends in Val-des-Bois at the junction of Route 309 which runs from the Buckingham sector north into the Upper Laurentians.

The main communities the highway passes through are Gatineau, Cantley and Val-des-Monts. In Gatineau, it is known as Rue Saint-Louis, in Cantley it is known as Montée de la Source and in Val-des Monts it is named Route Principale.

On June 23, 2010, part of the highway was closed between Val-des-Bois and Bowman, due to a partial bridge collapse caused by a 5.0 magnitude earthquake.

== Municipalities along Route 307 ==
- Val-des-Bois
- Bowman
- Val-des-Monts
- Cantley
- Gatineau
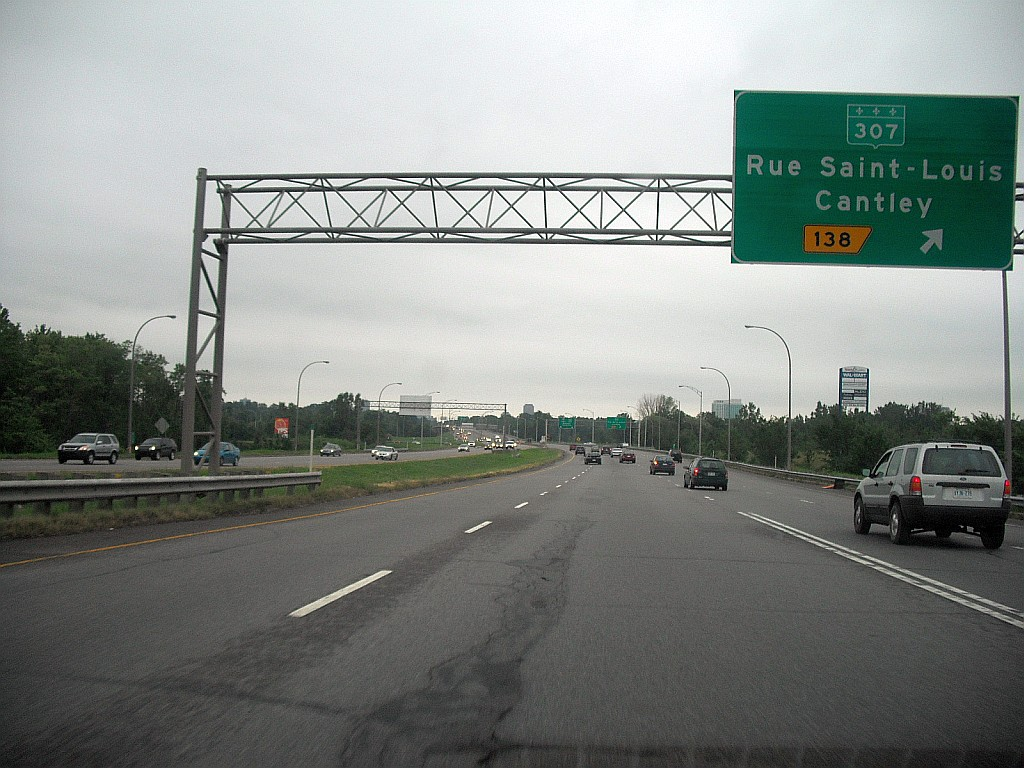
Autoroute 50 sign posting the exit towards Route 307 in Gatineau.

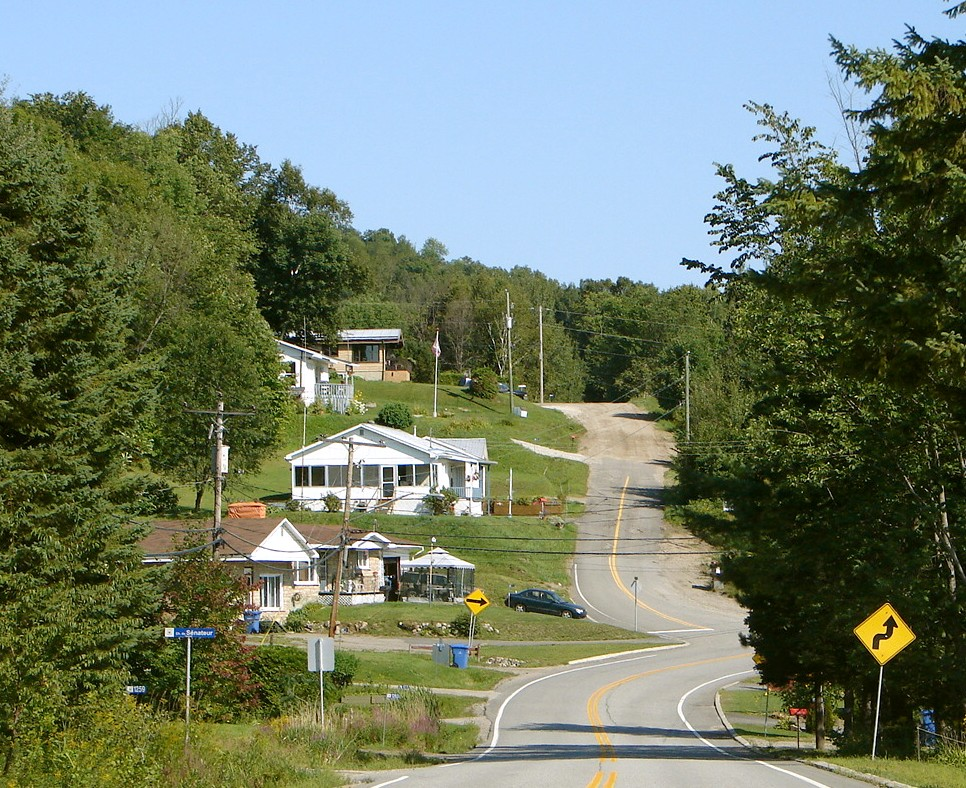
Route 307 in Saint-Pierre-de-Wakefield.

== Major intersections ==
RCM	Location	km	mi	Exit	Destinations	Notes
Outaouais	Gatineau	0.0	0.0		Boulevard Gréber	Southern terminus
Outaouais	Gatineau	1.1	0.68		A-50 east (Montréal) / R-148 east (Montréal)	Eastbound exit and entrance
Outaouais	Gatineau	1.6	0.99		A-50 west (Gatineau (Centre-Ville)) / R-148 west (Gatineau (Centre-Ville))	Westbound exit and entrance
Outaouais	Gatineau	5.6	3.5		R-105 (Gatineau (South), Chelsea (North))	Access to Route 105 via Alonzo-Wright Bridge (750 m)
Outaouais	Val-des-Monts	22.9	14.2		R-366 west (Wakefield)	West end of Route 366 concurrency
Outaouais	Val-des-Monts	29.8	18.5		R-366 east (Perkins)	East end of Route 366 concurrency
Outaouais	Val-des-Bois	67.0	41.6		R-309 (Mont-Laurier (North), Notre-Dame-de-la-Salette, Gatineau (South))	Northern terminus
1.000 mi = 1.609 km; 1.000 km = 0.621 mi: Concurrency terminus; Incomplete access

== See also ==
- List of Quebec provincial highways
- List of Gatineau roads
