= Quebec Route 366 =

Highway in Quebec, Canada

Route 366

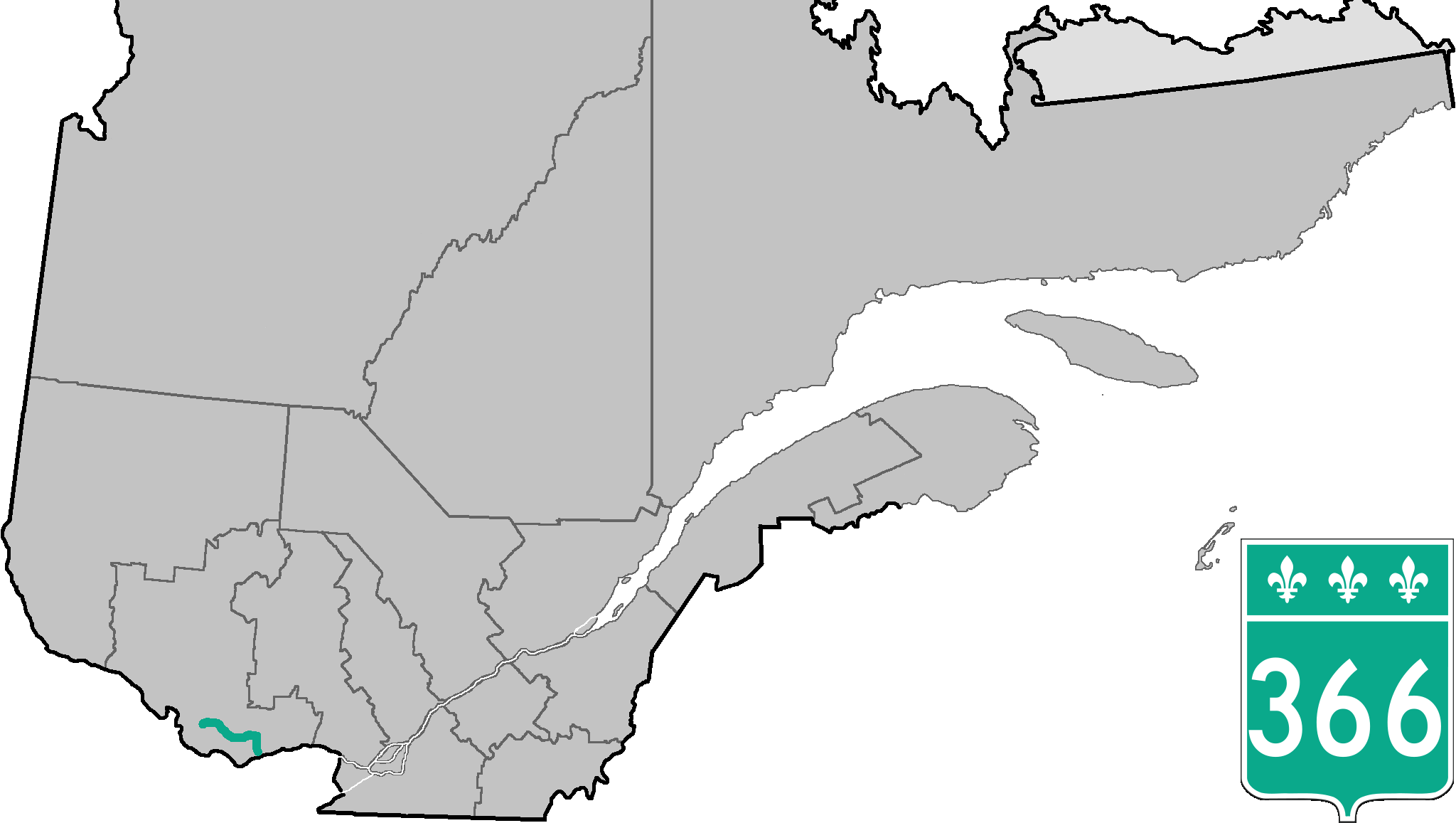

Route information
- Maintained by Transports Québec
- Length: 104 km (65 mi)

Major junctions
- West end: R-301 near Otter Lake
- R-303 in Ladysmith; A-5 / R-105 in Wakefield; R-307 in Val-des-Monts; A-50 in Gatineau
- East end: R-148 in Gatineau

Location
- Country: Canada
- Province: Quebec
- Major cities: Ladysmith, Lac-des-Loups, La Pêche (Ste-Cécile-de-Masham), Wakefield, Val-des-Monts (Saint-Pierre-de-Wakefield & Perkins), Gatineau

Highway system
- Quebec provincial highways; Autoroutes; List; Former
← R-365	→ R-367

Route 366 is a secondary highway in the Outaouais region of Quebec. It runs from Route 301 near Creemorne in the Pontiac to Route 148 in the city of Gatineau.

The section west of Lac-des-Loups is mostly unpaved. After skirting the northern boundary of Gatineau Park, the highway is briefly concurrent with Route 105 before continuing eastward. Near Val-des-Monts township it overlaps Route 307 for 7 km (4 mi) before veering south towards Gatineau and its terminus with Route 148.

In 2011, Google Maps mislabeled Quebec Route 366 as running concurrent with the entire length of U.S. Route 30 from Astoria, Oregon to Atlantic City, New Jersey.

== Municipalities along Route 366 ==
- Ladysmith
- Lac-des-Loups
- La Pêche (Ste-Cécile-de-Masham)
- Wakefield
- Val-des-Monts (Perkins)
- Gatineau

== Gallery ==
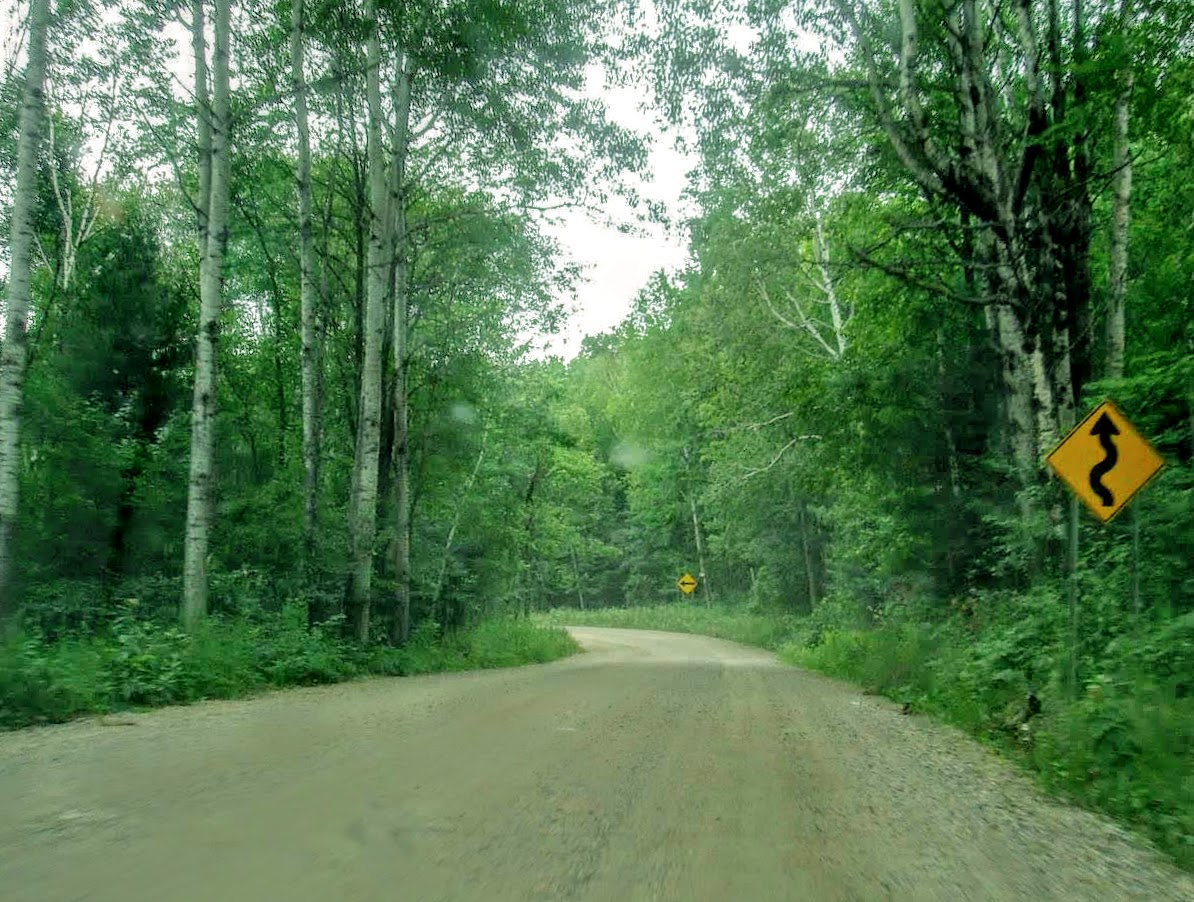
Unpaved section of Route 366

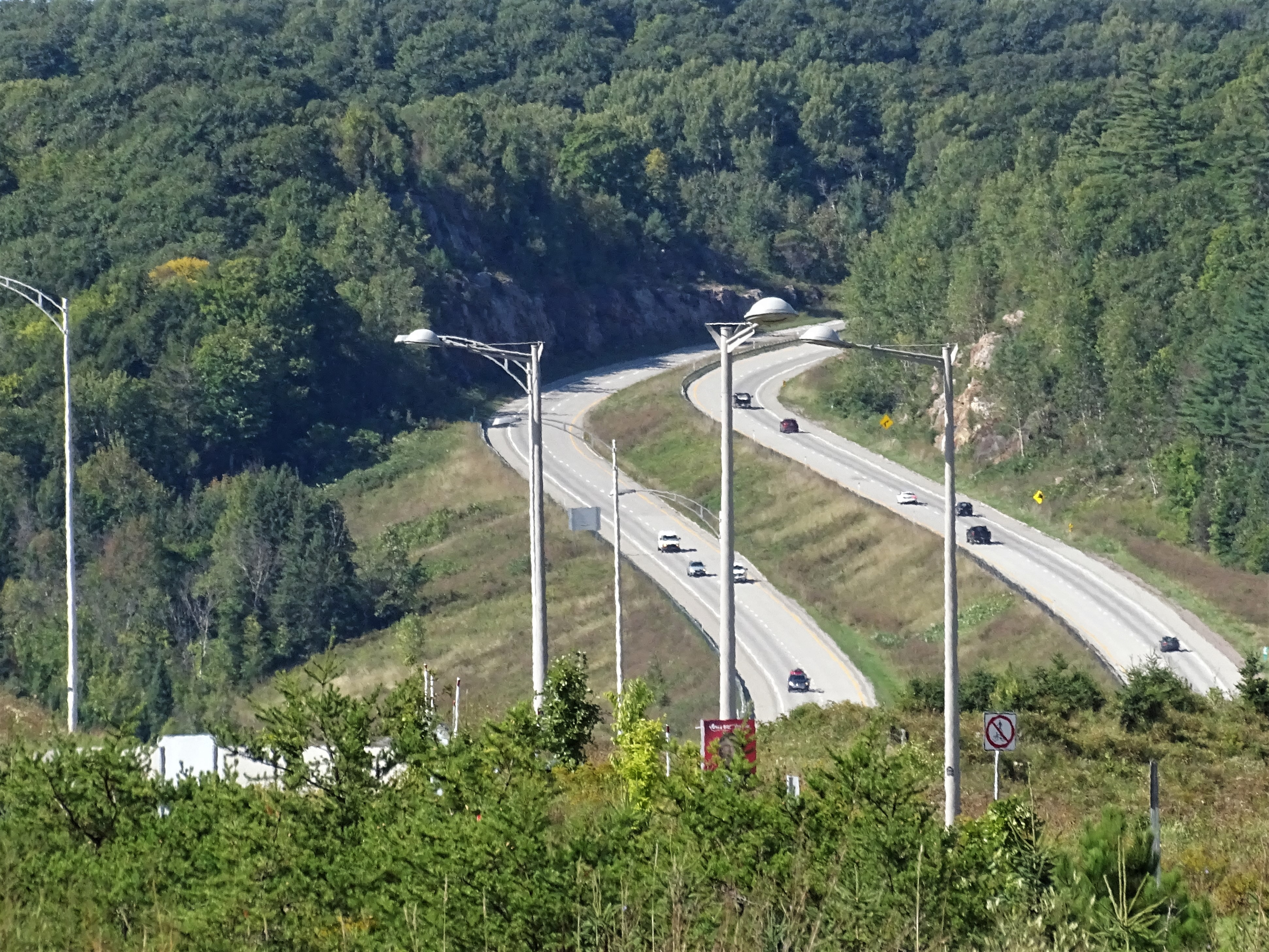
Section where Autoroute 5, Route 105, and Route 366 are concurrent

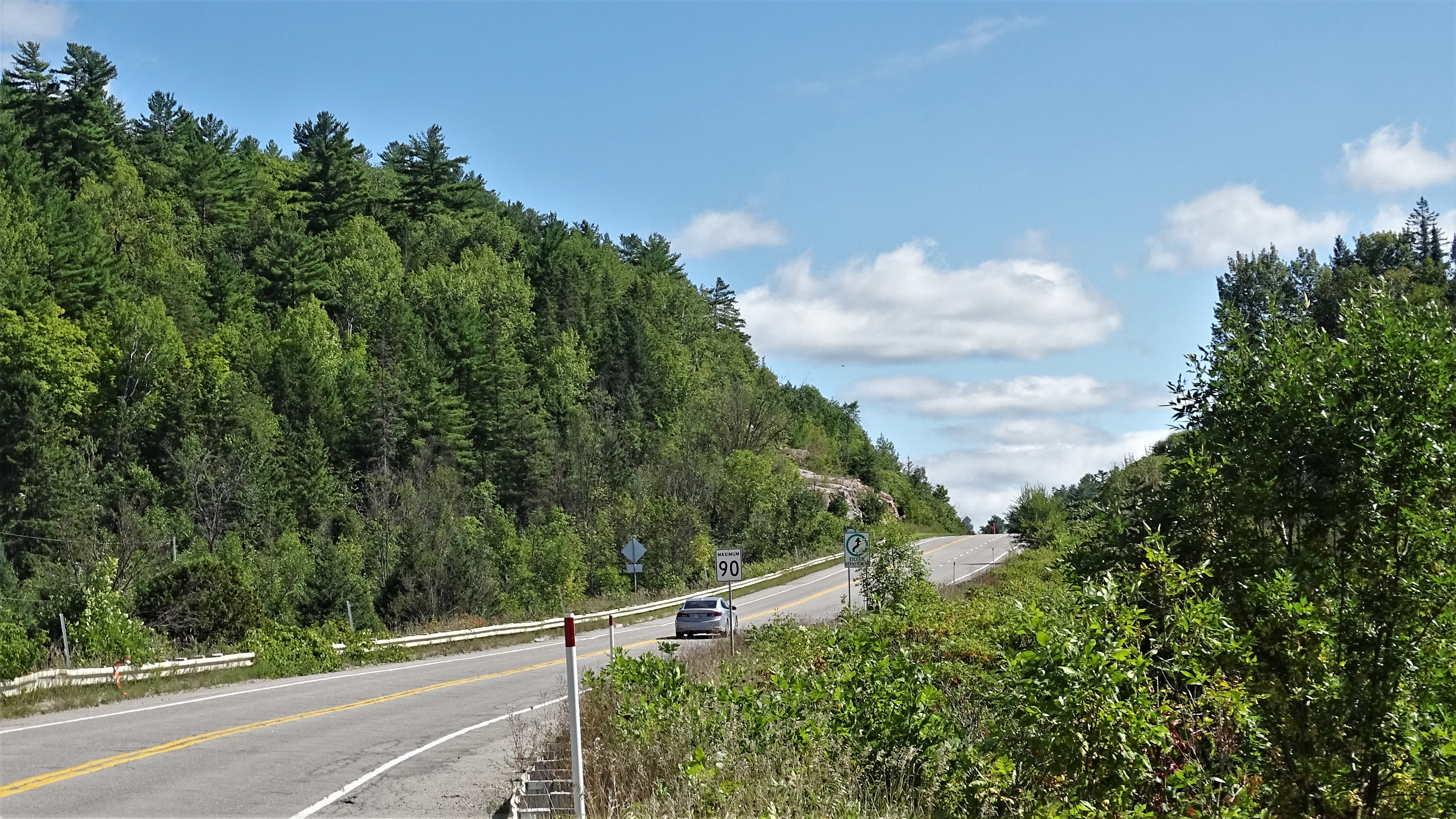
Quebec Route 366 west of Chemin de Wakefield Heights

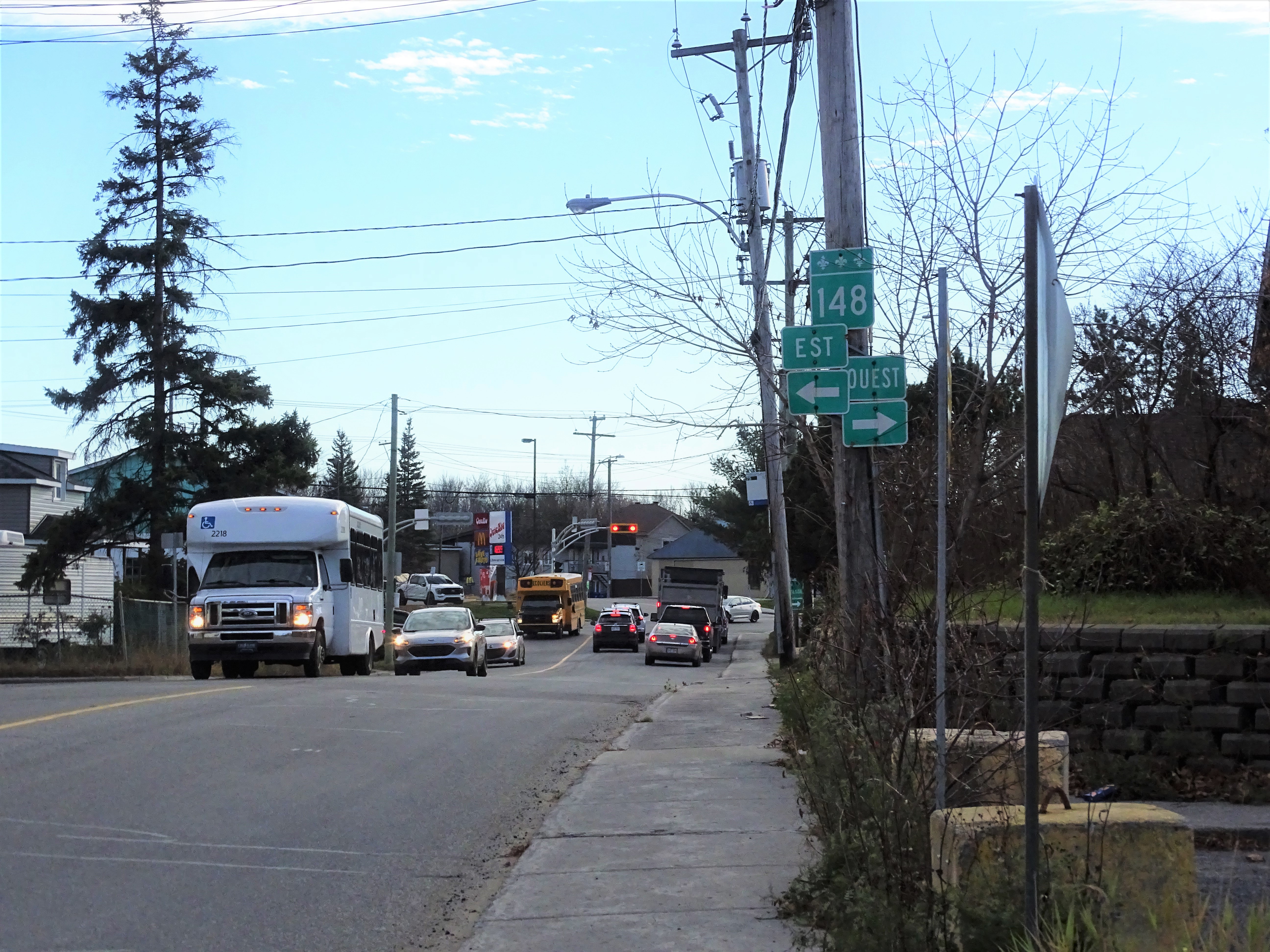
Southeastern terminus at Route 148 (Boulevard Maloney) in Gatineau, where Route 366 is named Boulevard Lorrain

== See also ==
- List of Quebec provincial highways
