= Val-des-Bois =

- Municipality
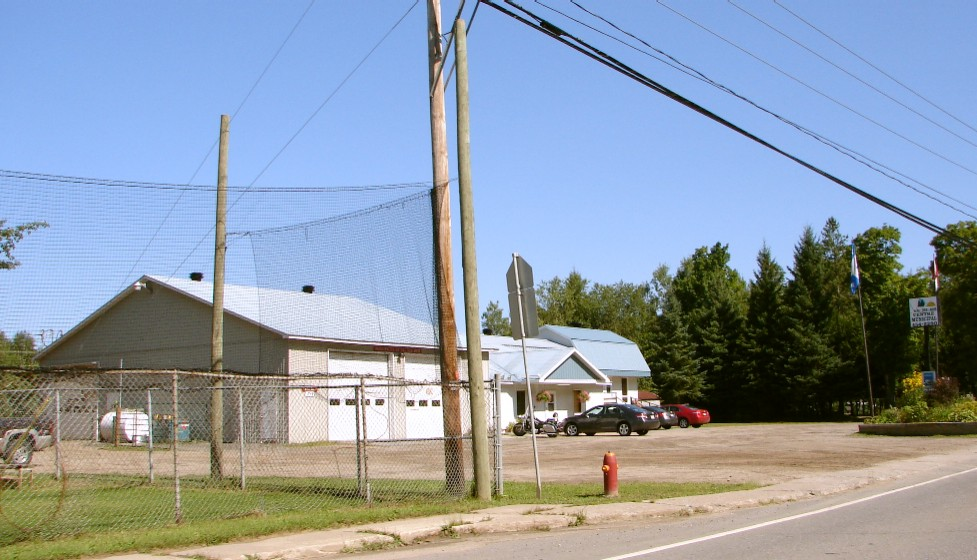
- Municipal office

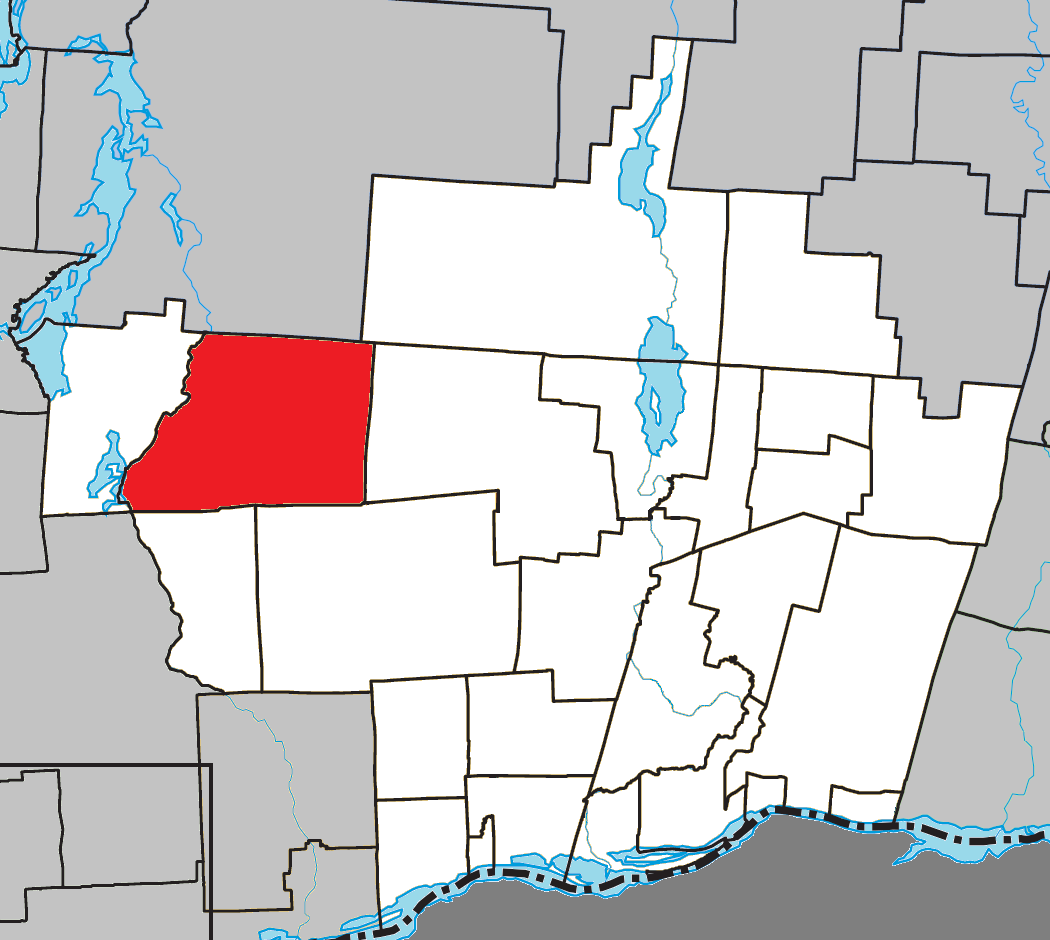
- Location within Papineau RCM

- Location in western Quebec
- Coordinates: 45°55′N 75°36′W
- Country: Canada
- Province: Quebec
- Region: Outaouais
- RCM: Papineau
- Constituted: January 1, 1885

Government
  - Mayor: Roland Montpetit
  - Federal riding: Argenteuil—La Petite-Nation
  - Prov. riding: Papineau

Area
  - Total: 245.60 km^{2} (94.83 sq mi)
  - Land: 222.67 km^{2} (85.97 sq mi)

Population (2021)
  - Total: 920
  - Density: 4.1/km^{2} (11/sq mi)
  - Pop 2016–2021: ▲6.4%
  - Dwellings: 837
- Time zone: UTC−5 (EST)
  - Summer (DST): UTC−4 (EDT)
- Postal code(s): J0X 3C0
- Area code: 819
- Highways: R-309
- Website: www.val-des-bois.ca

Val-des-Bois (French pronunciation: [val de bwa]) is a town and municipality in the Papineau Regional County Municipality in the Outaouais region of Quebec, Canada. The town is located on the eastern shores of the Du Lièvre River, 47 kilometers (29 mi) north of Buckingham.

The main local economic activity depends on cottage tourism. The eastern half of the municipality is part of the Papineau-Labelle Wildlife Reserve.

== Geography ==
As part of the Laurentian Highlands, its territory is dotted with lakes such Écho, de l'Argile, de l'Aqueduc, Vert, and Delphis. Echo Lake lies at an altitude of 243 meters (797 ft), while the surrounding relief rises to 472 meters (1,549 ft) above sea level.

== History ==
In 1873, the Township of Villeneuve was formed and named after Léonard-Vincent-Léon Villeneuve (1808–1873), member of Society of Saint-Sulpice, professor at the Petit Séminaire de Montréal (1838–1846), and pastor of Oka from 1871 to 1873.

In 1878, the local post office was named "Val-des-Bois". In 1883, the parish of Notre-Dame-de-la-Garde was formed, and two years later, the United Township Municipality of Bowman-et-Villeneuve was established. In 1913, the townships separated, forming the Township Municipality of Bowman and the Township Municipality of Villeneuve. In 1929, James Maclaren began construction on a dam at the High Falls of the Lièvre River, displacing 156 families because of the rising waters. The majority of them where German settlers, the average amount the families received from the MacLaren Co. were, depending on the acreage, between $1000 and $2000 each.

In 1958, Villeneuve was renamed to Val-des-Bois (French for "Valley of the Woods"), in reference to the beautiful forest which decorated the banks of the Lièvre River.

On 23 June 2010 a 5.0 earthquake struck the region, with its epicentre 8 km from Val-des-Bois, which was the closest settlement.

== Demographics ==
Canada census – Val-des-Bois community profile

	2016	2011
Population	865 (-7.8% from 2011)	938 (7.4% from 2006)
Land area	225.42 km^{2} (87.04 sq mi)	225.35 km^{2} (87.01 sq mi)
Population density	3.8/km^{2} (9.8/sq mi)	4.2/km^{2} (11/sq mi)
Median age	58.4 (M: 58.4, F: 58.4)	55.8 (M: 56.5, F: 55.3)
Private dwellings	851 (total)	1,003 (total)
Median household income	$46,592	$42,378

References: 2016 2011

Historical census populations – Val-des-Bois, Quebec
Year	Pop.	±%
1986	544	—
1991	624	+14.7%
1996	668	+7.1%
2001	732	+9.6%
2006	873	+19.3%
2011	938	+7.4%
2016	865	−7.8%
2021	920	+6.4%
Source: Statistics Canada

Mother tongue:

- English as first language: 5.8%
- French as first language: 91.9%
- English and French as first language: 1.2%
- Other as first language: 0.6%

== Local government ==
List of former mayors:

- Marcel Proulx (2001–2013)
- Daniel Rochon (2013–2015)
- Roland Montpetit (2015–present)
