= Litchfield, Quebec =

Litchfield
- Municipality
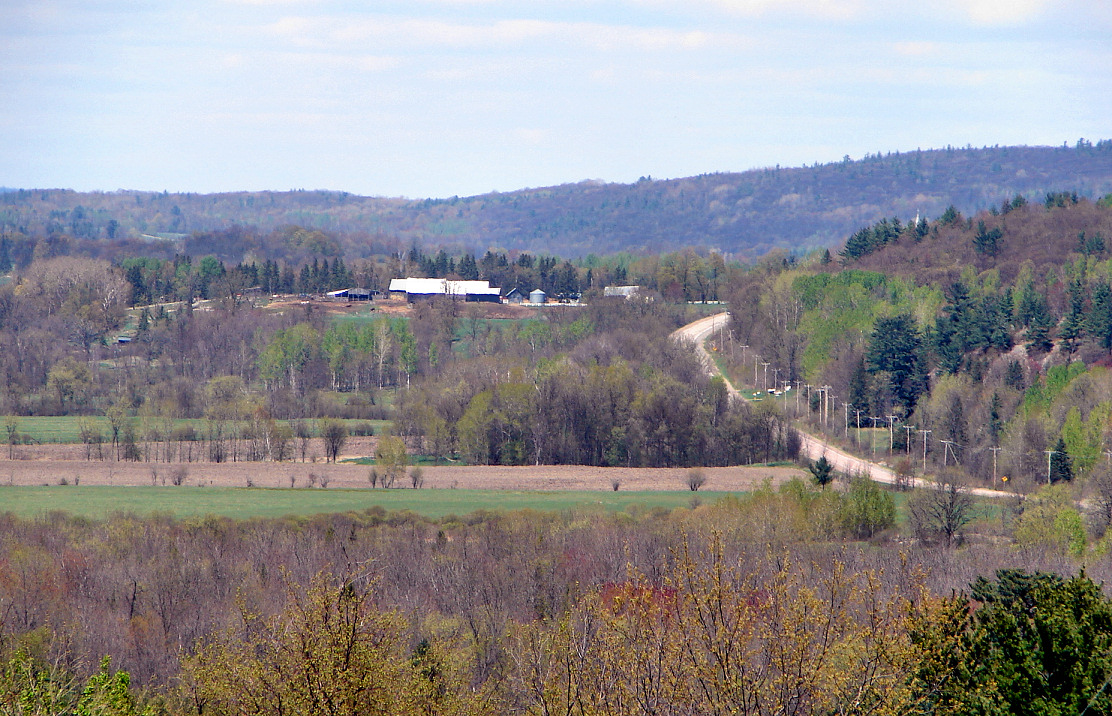

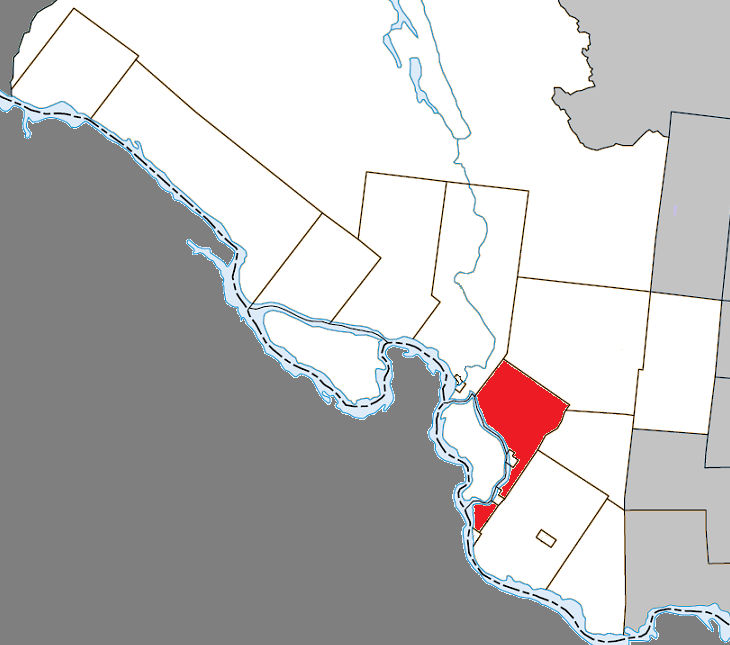
- Location within Pontiac RCM

- Location in western Quebec
- Coordinates: 45°45′N 76°35′W
- Country: Canada
- Province: Quebec
- Region: Outaouais
- RCM: Pontiac
- Constituted: July 1, 1855

Government
  - Mayor: Colleen Larivière
  - Federal riding: Pontiac—Kitigan Zibi
  - Prov. riding: Pontiac

Area
  - Total: 213.89 km^{2} (82.58 sq mi)
  - Land: 198.57 km^{2} (76.67 sq mi)

Population (2021)
  - Total: 500
  - Density: 2.5/km^{2} (6.5/sq mi)
  - Pop (2016-21): ▲8.9%
  - Dwellings: 417
- Time zone: UTC−05:00 (EST)
  - Summer (DST): UTC−04:00 (EDT)
- Postal code(s): J0X 1K0
- Area code: 819
- Highways: R-148; R-301
- Website: www.litchfield-qc.ca

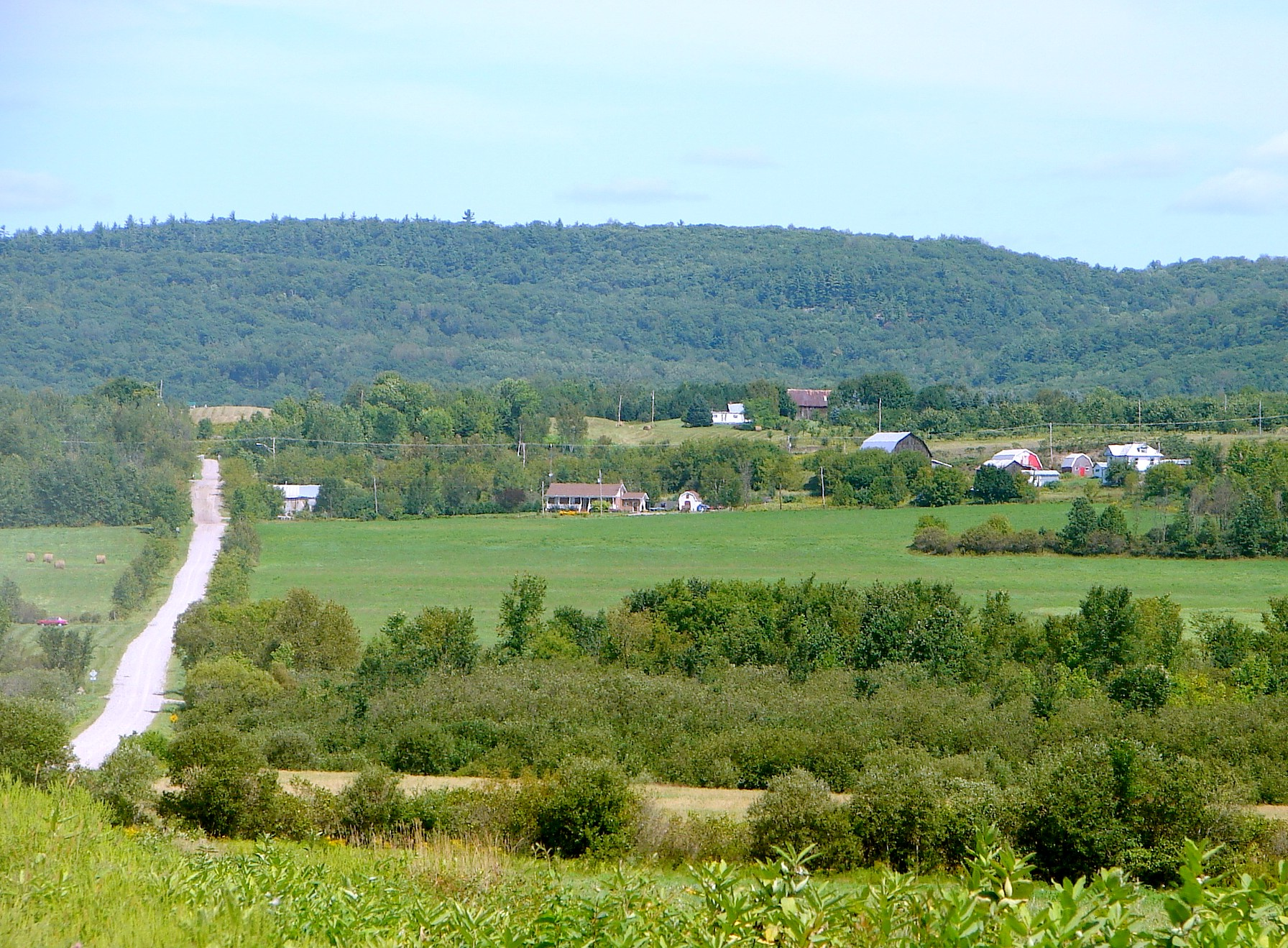
Vinton

Litchfield is a municipality in the Outaouais region, part of the Pontiac Regional County Municipality, Quebec, Canada. It is located on the shores of the eastern channel of the Ottawa River at Calumet Island.

Its settlements include Vinton (once known as St-Elizabeth-de-Franktown) and Goldwin. Notable lakes include Litchfield, Leslie, and Ours (Bear) Lakes.

== History ==
Litchfield Township (spelled "Licthfield" on the Gale and Duberger map of 1795) was officially created in 1834. It was probably named after Lichfield, an English town in Staffordshire, north of Birmingham. On November 20, 1846, the township was incorporated with Alfred Lancaster as its first mayor. It was abolished the next year and became part of the Ottawa County Municipality. It was reestablished in 1855.

In 1863, the Municipality of Portage-du-Fort Village separated from Litchfield's territory, followed by Bryson in 1873, and by Campbell's Bay in 1904. Because Bryson was located in the narrowest part of the municipality, between L'Île-du-Grand-Calumet and Clarendon, it separated the municipality's territory in two.

In 1964, the Pontiac County Council (now Pontiac MRC) built its headquarters in Litchfield on Quebec Route 148 at the edge of Campbell's Bay.

On November 6, 2004, the Township Municipality of Litchfield changed its status to become the Municipality of Litchfield.

== Demographics ==
=== Population ===
Canada census – Litchfield community profile

	2021	2016	2011
Population	500 (+8.9% from 2016)	459 (0.7% from 2011)	456 (-5.6% from 2006)
Land area	198.57 km^{2} (76.67 sq mi)	202.18 km^{2} (78.06 sq mi)	202.63 km^{2} (78.24 sq mi)
Population density	2.5/km^{2} (6.5/sq mi)	2.3/km^{2} (6.0/sq mi)	2.3/km^{2} (6.0/sq mi)
Median age	53.2 (M: 51.6, F: 54.0)	49.9 (M: 50.6, F: 49.0)	46.8 (M: 45.5, F: 48.2)
Private dwellings	417 (total) 229 (occupied)	449 (total)	229 (total)
Median household income	$66,000	$59,264	$41,939

References: 2021 2016 2011

Historical Census Data - Litchfield, Quebec

Year	Pop.	±%
1976	650	—
1981	583	−10.3%
1986	523	−10.3%
1991	493	−5.7%
1996	484	−1.8%

Year	Pop.	±%
2001	509	+5.2%
2006	483	−5.1%
2011	456	−5.6%
2016	459	+0.7%
2021	500	+8.9%

Source: Statistics Canada

=== Language ===
Mother tongue (2021):

- English as first language: 64.0%
- French as first language: 33.0%
- English and French as first language: 3.0%
- Other languages: 1.0%

== Local government ==
List of former mayors:

- Michael McCrank (2001–2013)
- Colleen Larivière (2013–present)

== See also ==
- List of anglophone communities in Quebec
- List of municipalities in Quebec
