= Quebec Route 301 =

Highway in Quebec, Canada

Route 301

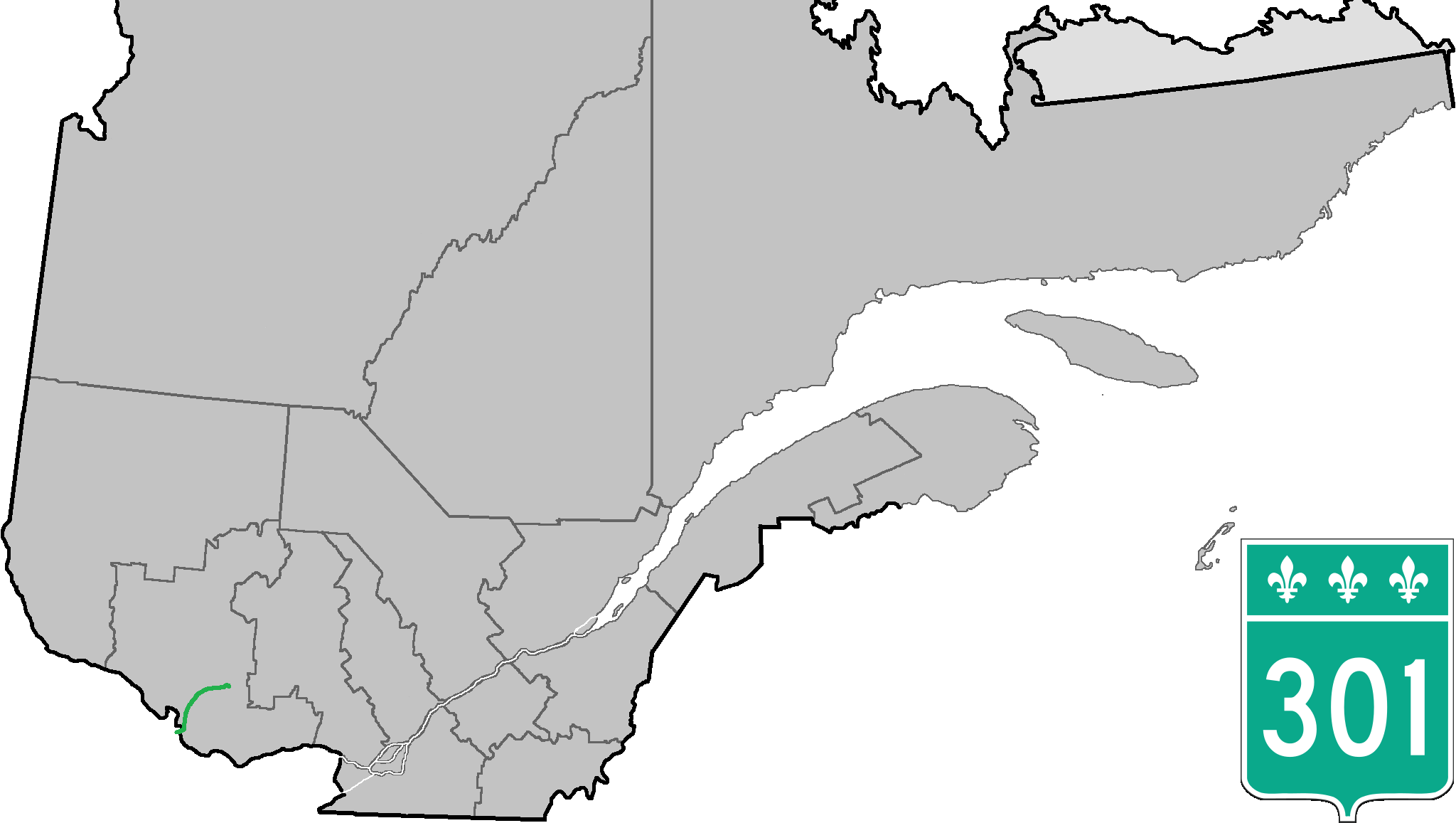

Route information
- Maintained by Transports Québec
- Length: 81.1 km (50.4 mi)

Major junctions
- South end: County Road 653 at the Ontario border (formerly Highway 653)
- R-303 in Portage-du-Fort; R-148 in Campbell's Bay; R-366 in Thorne; R-303 in Otter Lake
- North end: R-105 in Kazabazua

Location
- Country: Canada
- Province: Quebec

Highway system
- Quebec provincial highways; Autoroutes; List; Former
← R-299	→ R-303

Route 301 is an 81.1-kilometre-long (50.4 mi) provincial highway located in the Outaouais region in western Quebec. The route serves as a direct connection between the Pontiac region and the Upper Gatineau region. The 82-kilometer route runs from the end of Ontario Highway 653 near Portage-du-Fort and joins Route 148 for a 9 km (5.6 mi) stretch up to Campbell's Bay where it continues eastward and ends in Kazabazua at the junction of Route 105.

== Municipalities along Highway 301 ==
- Portage-du-Fort
- Bryson
- Litchfield
- Campbell's Bay
- Thorne
- Otter Lake
- Alleyn-et-Cawood
- Kazabazua

== Major intersections ==
RCM	Location	km	mi	Destinations	Notes
Pontiac	Portage-du-Fort	0.0	0.0	County Road 653 south – Chenaux	Continuation into Ontario; formerly Highway 653
Pontiac	Portage-du-Fort	0.0	0.0	Crosses the Ottawa River (French: Rivière des Outaouais)	
Pontiac	Portage-du-Fort	1.5	0.93	R-303 north – Shawville	
Pontiac	Litchfield	10.3	6.4	R-148 east – Gatineau	Southern end of R-148 concurrency; near Bryson
Pontiac	Campbell's Bay	20.4	12.7	R-148 west – Fort-Coulonge	Northern end of R-148 concurrency
Pontiac	Thorne	34.9	21.7	R-366 east – Ladysmith	
Pontiac	Otter Lake	41.4	25.7	R-303 south – Ladysmith, Shawville	
La Vallée-de-la-Gatineau	Kazabazua	81.1	50.4	R-105 – Gracefield, Maniwaki, Low, Gatineau	
1.000 mi = 1.609 km; 1.000 km = 0.621 mi: Concurrency terminus; Route transition

== See also ==
- List of Quebec provincial highways
