= Bowman, Quebec =

Bowman
- Municipality
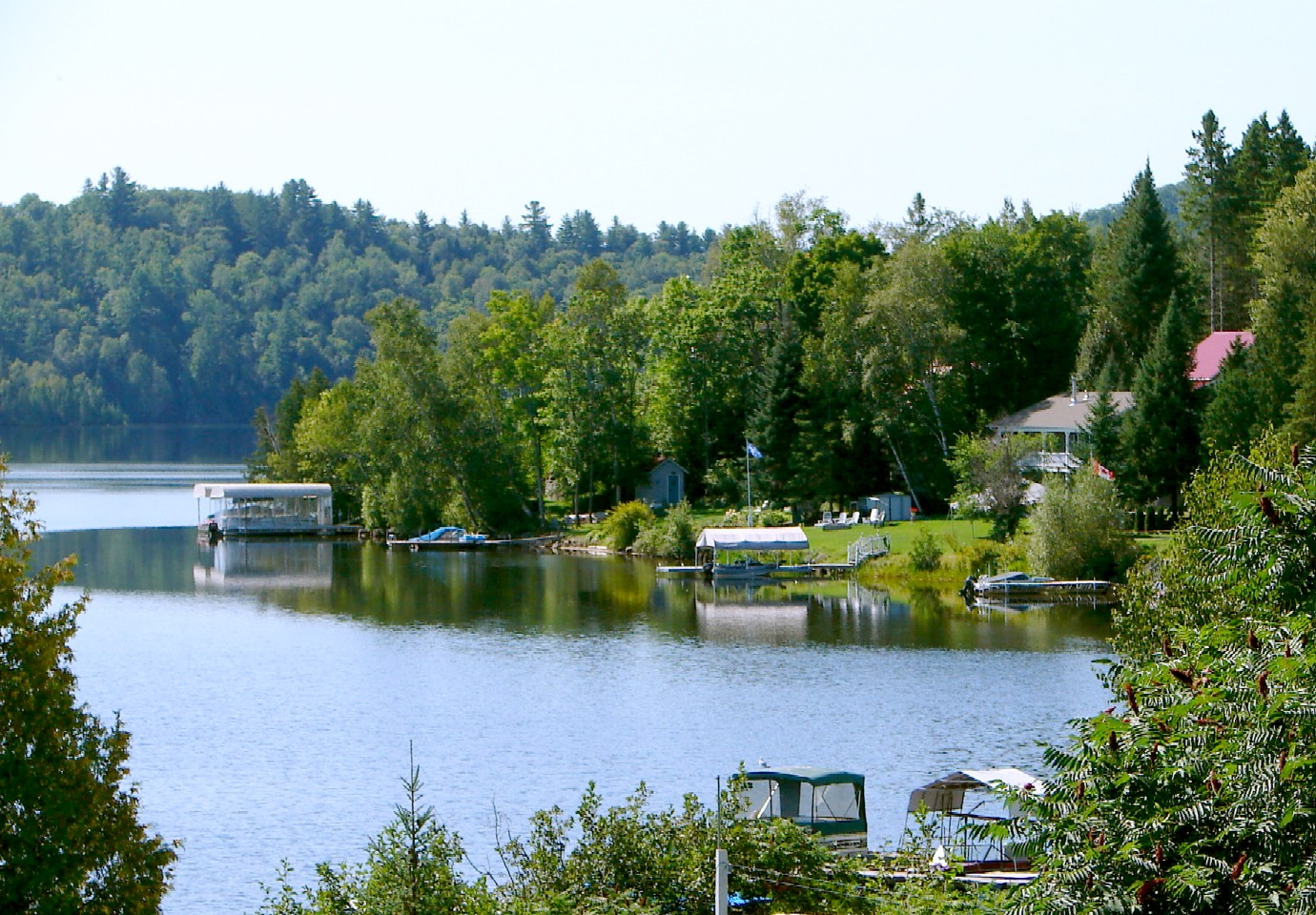
- Reservoir l'Escalier

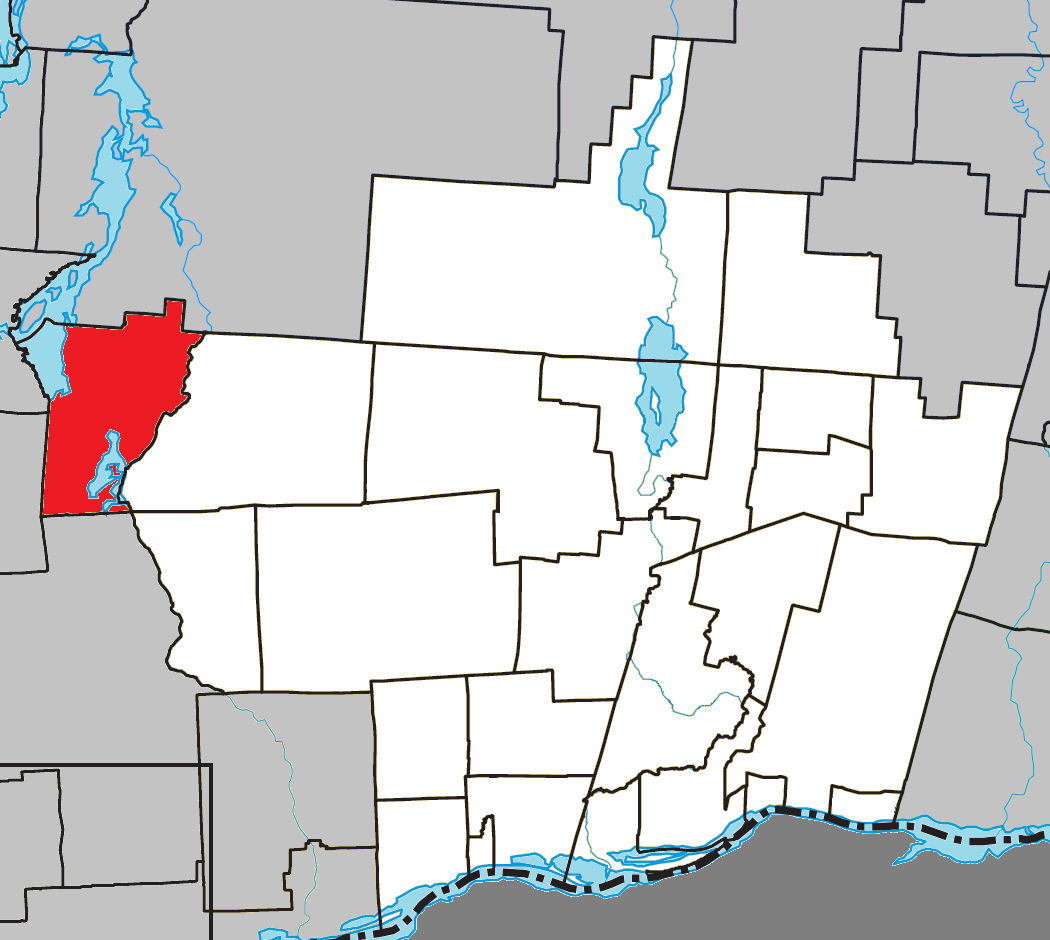
- Location within Papineau RCM

- Location in western Quebec
- Coordinates: 45°55′N 75°40′W
- Country: Canada
- Province: Quebec
- Region: Outaouais
- RCM: Papineau
- Constituted: June 27, 1913

Government
  - Mayor: Michel David
  - Federal riding: Argenteuil—La Petite-Nation
  - Prov. riding: Papineau

Area
  - Total: 164.40 km^{2} (63.48 sq mi)
  - Land: 129.30 km^{2} (49.92 sq mi)

Population (2016)
  - Total: 658
  - Density: 5.1/km^{2} (13/sq mi)
  - Pop 2011-2016: ▼2.8%
  - Dwellings: 546
- Time zone: UTC−5 (EST)
  - Summer (DST): UTC−4 (EDT)
- Postal code(s): J0X 3C0
- Area code: 819
- Highways: R-307
- Website: www.bowman.ca

Bowman is a village and municipality in the Outaouais region of Quebec, Canada. It is located in the Laurentian Hills, 72 kilometres (45 mi) north-east of Gatineau.

== Geography ==
The municipality is bordered to the east by the Du Lièvre River and by Whitefish Lake (lac du Poisson Blanc) in the north-west. Its terrain is characterized by several deep lakes (including Reservoir l'Escalier) in a hilly terrain with altitudes between 200 meters (660 ft) and 430 meters (1,410 ft).

== History ==
Bowman Township was formed in 1861 and named after one of the first inhabitants of this place, Baxter Bowman, who operated a sawmill at Dufferin Chutes in Buckingham and was owner of a large tract of forest in the Outaouais in the late nineteenth century.

On 1 January 1885, Bowman was combined with Villeneuve Township to form the United Township Municipality of Bowman-et-Villeneuve. In 1913, the Township Municipality of Bowman was formed when the two townships separated (Villeneuve was renamed to Val-des-Bois in 1958), and in 1954, its statutes were amended again to become the Municipality of Bowman.

Bowman was affected by the 2010 Central Canada earthquake and suffered some damage to a 50 metre wide area of land near a bridge. Traffic on Route 307 was diverted while Transport Canada assessed the damage. There were no fatalities.

== Demographics ==
Canada census – Bowman community profile

	2021	2016	2011
Population	667 (+1.4% from 2016)	658 (-2.8% from 2011)	677 (0.1% from 2006)
Land area	126.40 km^{2} (48.80 sq mi)	129.30 km^{2} (49.92 sq mi)	129.75 km^{2} (50.10 sq mi)
Population density	5.3/km^{2} (14/sq mi)	5.1/km^{2} (13/sq mi)	5.2/km^{2} (13/sq mi)
Median age	59.6 (M: 60.0, F: 59.2)	56.4 (M: 51.8, F: 50.5)	51.9 (M: 52.0, F: 51.8)
Private dwellings	546 (total) 335 (occupied)	546 (total)	527 (total)
Median household income	$63,600	$48,768	$54,637

References: 2021 2016 2011

Historical census populations – Bowman, Quebec
Year	Pop.	±%
1986	405	—
1991	481	+18.8%
1996	516	+7.3%
2001	563	+9.1%
2006	676	+20.1%
2011	677	+0.1%
2016	658	−2.8%
Population amounts are not adjusted for boundary changes. Source: Statistics Canada

Mother tongue:

- English as first language: 9.8%
- French as first language: 88.6%
- English and French as first language: 0.8%
- Other as first language: 1.5%

== Local government ==
List of former mayors:

- Roger Madore (2005–2009)
- Michel David (2009-2017)
- Pierre Labonté (2017–present)

== See also ==
- List of anglophone communities in Quebec
