= Campbell's Bay, Quebec =

Campbell's Bay
- Municipality
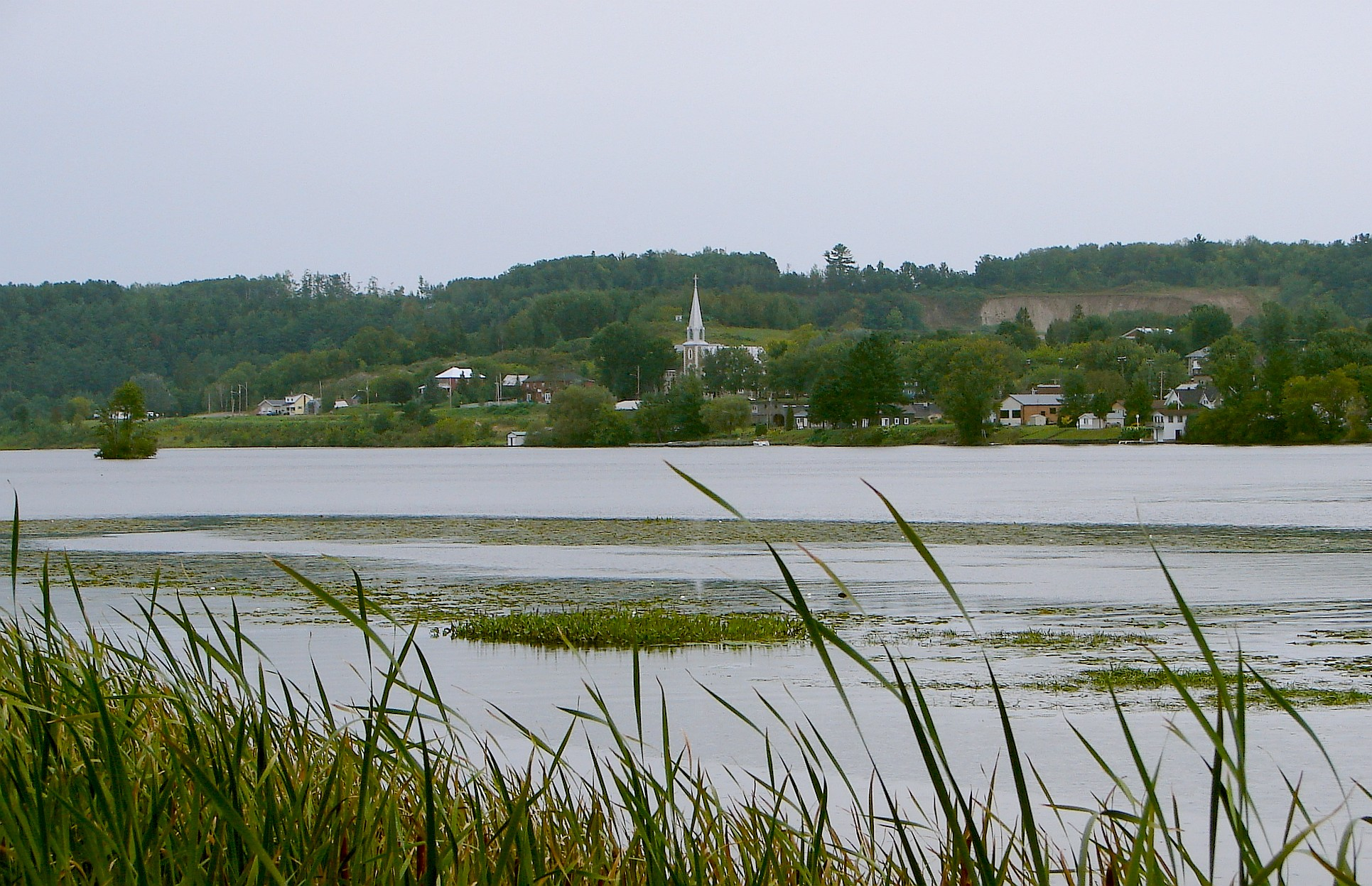

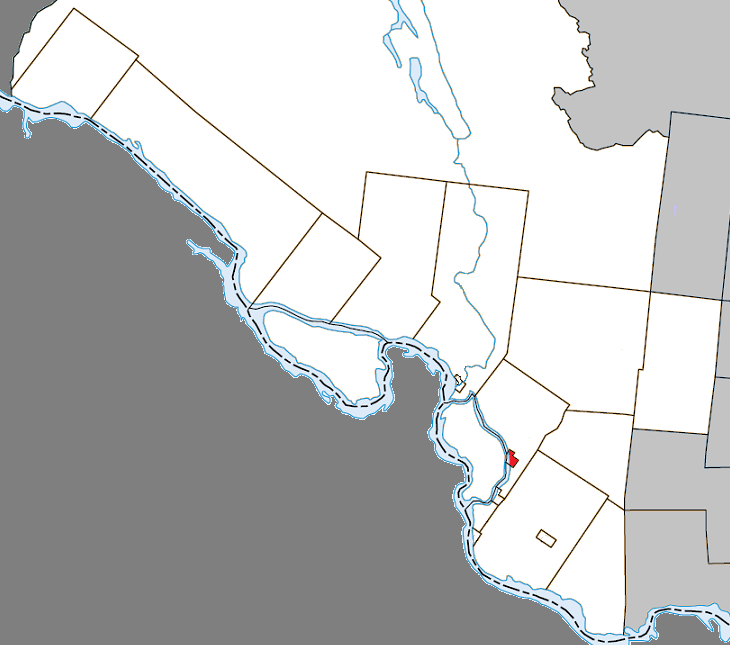
- Location within Pontiac RCM

- Location in western Quebec
- Coordinates: 45°44′N 76°36′W
- Country: Canada
- Province: Quebec
- Region: Outaouais
- RCM: Pontiac
- Constituted: February 23, 1904

Government
  - Mayor: Raymond Pilon
  - Federal riding: Pontiac—Kitigan Zibi
  - Prov. riding: Pontiac

Area
  - Total: 3.42 km^{2} (1.32 sq mi)
  - Land: 3.30 km^{2} (1.27 sq mi)

Population (2021)
  - Total: 705
  - Density: 206/km^{2} (530/sq mi)
- Time zone: UTC−5 (EST)
  - Summer (DST): UTC−4 (EDT)
- Postal code(s): J0X 1K0
- Area code: 819
- Access Routes: R-148; R-301
- Website: campbellsbay.ca

Campbell's Bay is a municipality in Pontiac Regional County Municipality in western Quebec, Canada. Its population in 2021 was 705.

It is the county seat and is home to most government offices for the county, including the Sûreté du Québec, and has French and English elementary schools. Campbell's Bay is in the heart of the Pontiac, as it is situated between Shawville and Fort-Coulonge. It also lies completely enclosed by the municipality of Litchfield on all sides, except for the Ottawa River to the west.

Campbell's Bay is the seat of the judicial district of Pontiac.

== History ==
In 1851, Lieutenant Donald Campbell, a member of the Scottish Regiment, received a large tract of land along a bay of the Ottawa River (now known as Lac à Campbell), which was named after him. He settled there and operated a sawmill. In 1888, the Campbell's Bay Post Office opened, and in 1904, the village municipality was formed when it separated from Litchfield.

A hanging took place in 1935 in Campbell's Bay Court Yard. Michael Bradley was convicted of the murder of five family members. He was the last person to be hanged in Campbell's Bay.

In 2003, it changed status from Village Municipality to (regular) Municipality.

== Demographics ==
Canada census – Campbell's Bay community profile

	2021	2016	2011
Population	705 (-5.2% from 2016)	744 (-4.0% from 2011)	775 (+4.0% from 2006)
Land area	3.42 km^{2} (1.32 sq mi)	3.55 km^{2} (1.37 sq mi)	3.54 km^{2} (1.37 sq mi)
Population density	206/km^{2} (530/sq mi)	209.4/km^{2} (542/sq mi)	219.1/km^{2} (567/sq mi)
Median age	49.2 (M: 46.8, F: 51.2)	49.1 (M: 47.0, F: 50.5)	45.2 (M: 41.8, F: 48.1)
Private dwellings	354 (total) 314 (occupied)	349 (total)	350 (total)
Median household income	$52,400	$47,445	$38,079

References: 2021 2016 2011

Historical Census Data - Campbell's Bay, Quebec

Year	Pop.	±%
1976	1,087	—
1981	1,007	−7.4%
1986	911	−9.5%
1991	912	+0.1%
1996	874	−4.2%

Year	Pop.	±%
2001	766	−12.4%
2006	745	−2.7%
2011	775	+4.0%
2016	744	−4.0%
2021	705	−5.2%

Source: Statistics Canada

== Government ==
The town government comprises a mayor and 6 councilors.

Current council:

- Mayor: Raymond Pilon
- Councillors: Leen Matthyssen, Tim Ferrigan, Josey Bouchard, Jean-Pierre Landry, Stéphanie Hébert-Potter and Suzanne Dubeau-Pilon

List of former mayors:

- Cletus Ferrigan (2002–2005)
- Jean-Louis Auger (2005–2009)
- William Stewart (2009–2017)
- Maurice Beauregard (2017–present)

== Town festivals ==
- FallFest at the Church of Faith, Praise and Prayer
- Bikes in the Bay - weekend of motorcycle events, music, food, and kids' activities on June 12, 13 & 14, 2009, visit www.bikesinthebay.com for more info

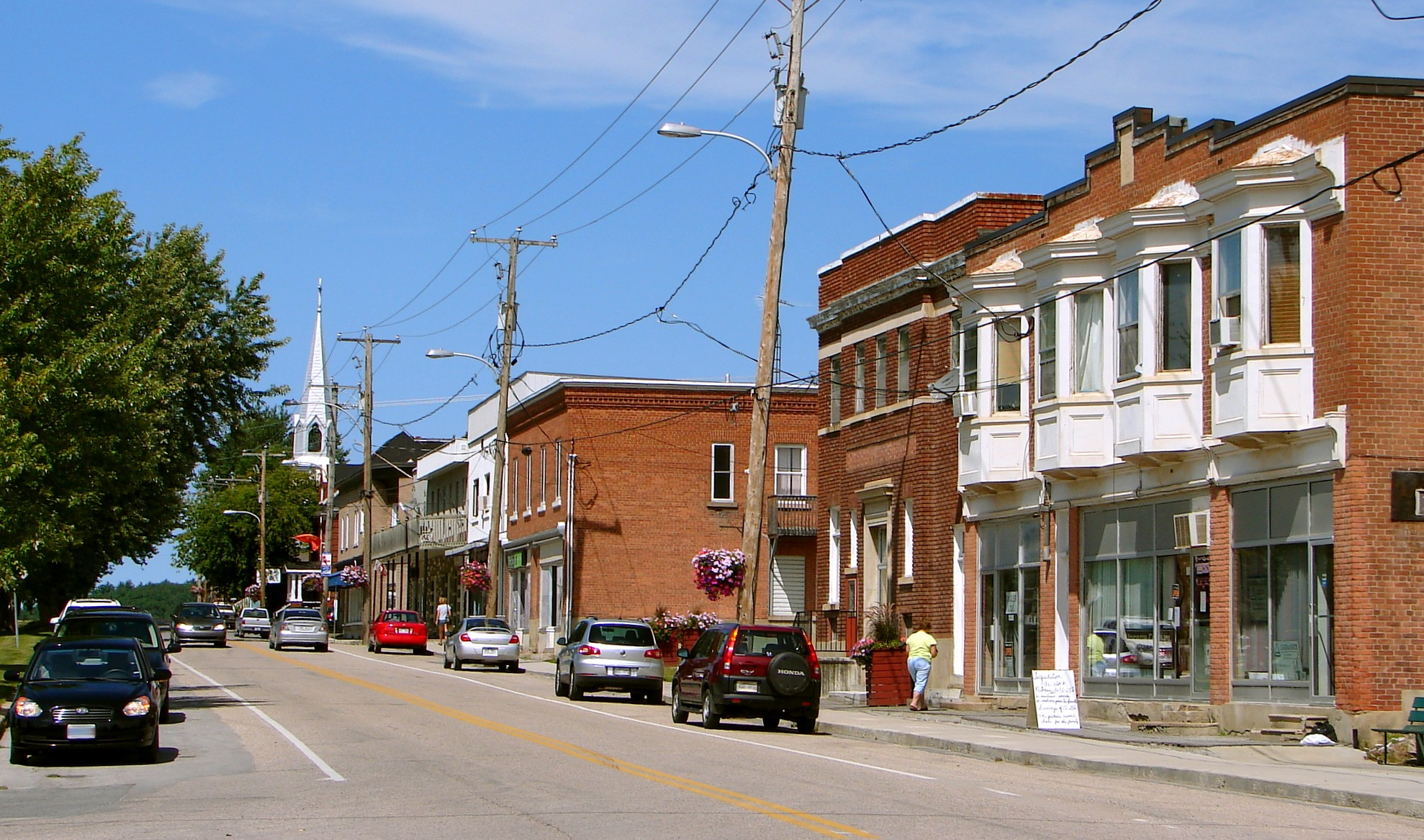
Front Street

== Transportation ==
Quebec Route 148 and Quebec Route 301 (rue Leslie) are the main roads that connect into and out of Campbell's Bay. Front Street (rue Front) is the longest and main road within town.

There are no railway stations or airports within or near Campbell's Bay. The nearest major airport is Ottawa International Airport.

== See also ==
- List of anglophone communities in Quebec
- List of municipalities in Quebec
