= Thorne, Quebec =

Thorne
- Municipality
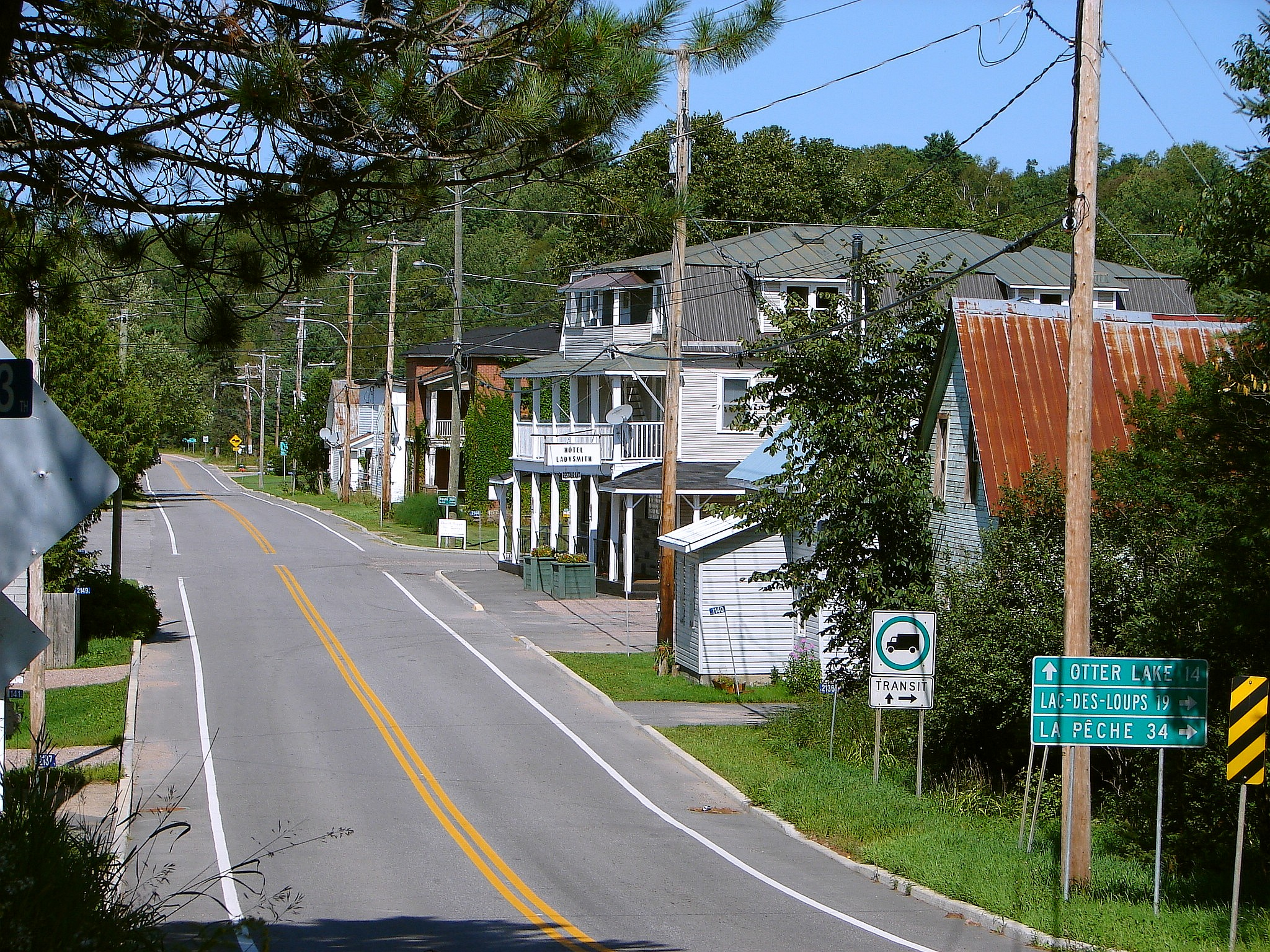
- Ladysmith

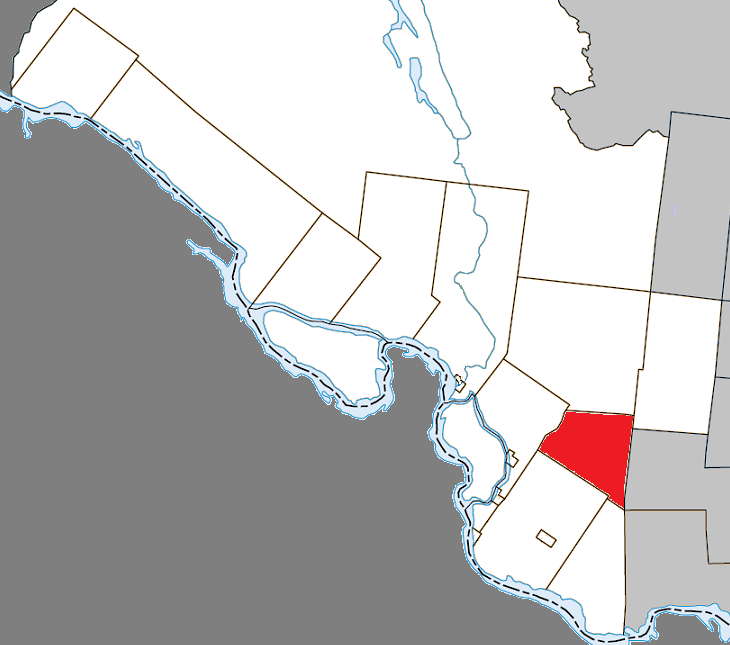
- Location within Pontiac RCM

- Location in western Quebec
- Coordinates: 45°45′N 76°26′W
- Country: Canada
- Province: Quebec
- Region: Outaouais
- RCM: Pontiac
- Constituted: January 1, 1860

Government
  - Mayor: Karen Daly Kelly
  - Federal riding: Pontiac—Kitigan Zibi
  - Prov. riding: Pontiac

Area
  - Total: 181.59 km^{2} (70.11 sq mi)
  - Land: 173.09 km^{2} (66.83 sq mi)

Population (2021)
  - Total: 528
  - Density: 3.1/km^{2} (8.0/sq mi)
  - Pop (2016-21): ▲17.9%
  - Dwellings: 659
- Time zone: UTC−5 (EST)
  - Summer (DST): UTC−4 (EDT)
- Postal code(s): J0X 2A0
- Area code: 819
- Highways: R-301; R-303
- Website: thornequebec.ca

Thorne is a municipality in the Pontiac Regional County Municipality, Quebec, Canada, about 63 kilometres (39 mi) northwest of Downtown Gatineau, part of the Outaouais region.

It is named after a town with the same name in Yorkshire, England. The name Thorn(e) is rarely used alone in English toponymy where it is more common in other forms such as Thornhill, Thornton, Thornley, Thornham, Thorngrove.

== Geography ==
Thorne is located in the Gatineau Hills with its highest hills reaching an elevation of 300 metres (980 ft) above sea level. Its notable lakes are Barnes, Johnson, Mecham, Sparling, Thorne, and Toote Lakes.

Its settlements include Greer Mount, Hodgins, Ladysmith, Schwartz, Thornby, and Thorne Centre.

== History ==
On May 1, 1861, the Township of Thorne was formed when it separated from Clarendon Township. But because it was too small to form its own municipality, it was merged with Leslie Township. James Martin was its first mayor.

That same year, it had a population between 450 and 465 people, made up of mixed national origin but only fourteen French Canadians. During the next ten years, the area had a large increase of settlers from German descent.

In 1867, Leslie Township separated (now part of Otter Lake) and Thorne was merged with its neighbouring townships to form the United Township Municipality of Thorne-Cawood-et-Alleyn. In 1876, the Cawood and Alleyn townships were separated, resulting in the creation of the Township Municipality of Thorne on January 1, 1877, with John Rennix as mayor.

On August 2, 2003, the statute of the municipality changed and the Township Municipality of Thorne became the Municipality of Thorne.

== Demographics ==
=== Population ===
Canada census – Thorne, Quebec community profile

| | 2021 | 2016 | 2011 |
| Population | 528 (17.9% from 2016) | 448 (53.4% from 2011) | 292 (-31.6% from 2006) |
| Land area | 173.09 km^{2} (66.83 sq mi) | 175.55 km^{2} (67.78 sq mi) | 175.21 km^{2} (67.65 sq mi) |
| Population density | 3.1/km^{2} (8.0/sq mi) | 2.6/km^{2} (6.7/sq mi) | 1.7/km^{2} (4.4/sq mi) |
| Median age | 58.8 (M: 58.8, F: 58.4) | 56.2 (M: 55.8, F: 56.9) | 53.3 (M: 53.6, F: 52.9) |
| Private dwellings | 659 (total) | 692 (total) | 374 (total) |
| Median household income | $50,000 | $43,776 | $.N/A |

Notes: 2011 income data for this area has been suppressed for data quality or confidentiality reasons.
References: 2021 2016 2011

Historical Census Data - Thorne, Quebec

| Year | Pop. | ±% |
|---|---|---|
| 1976 | 337 | — |
| 1981 | 378 | +12.2% |
| 1986 | 350 | −7.4% |
| 1991 | 359 | +2.6% |
| 1996 | 397 | +10.6% |

| Year | Pop. | ±% |
|---|---|---|
| 2001 | 408 | +2.8% |
| 2006 | 427 | +4.7% |
| 2011 | 292 | −31.6% |
| 2016 | 448 | +53.4% |
| 2021 | 528 | +17.9% |

Source: Statistics Canada

=== Language ===
Mother tongues (2021):

- English as first language: 70.8%
- French as first language: 22.6%
- English and French as first language: 3.8%
- Other as first language: 2.8%

== See also ==
- List of anglophone communities in Quebec
- List of municipalities in Quebec
