= 1998 Pymatuning earthquake =

Earthquake in Pennsylvania, United States

- Location within Pennsylvania
- UTC time: 1998-09-25 19:52:52
- ISC event: 1206808
- USGS-ANSS: ComCat
- Local date: September 25, 1998
- Local time: 03:52 p.m. EDT
- Magnitude: mb_{Lg} 5.2
- Depth: 5 km (3.1 mi)
- Epicenter: 41.495°N 80.388°W
- Fault: Southern Great Lakes seismic zone
- Type: Oblique-slip reverse
- Areas affected: Pennsylvania, Ohio
- Max. intensity: MMI VII (Very strong)

The 1998 Pymatuning earthquake occurred in the U.S. state of Pennsylvania on September 25 at 19:52 UTC. With a magnitude of 5.2 mb_{Lg}, it was the largest recorded earthquake in Pennsylvania's history.

== Earthquake ==
The earthquake's epicenter was in the Southern Great Lakes seismic zone, about 25 kilometers (16 mi) southwest of Meadville; its depth was 5 kilometers (3 mi). The earthquake caused minor damage in towns near its epicenter and was felt in the states of Ohio, Pennsylvania, Indiana, Michigan, New York, Illinois and New Jersey, as well as Southern Ontario in Canada.

== Hydrologic occurrences ==
After the earthquake many wells in the epicentral region began to dry up, while new springs and old wells began to flow. A three-month date range revealed 120 dry household-supply wells on the ridge of Jamestown and Greenville. Declines of up to 100 feet (30 m) were observed on a ridge where at least 80 of these wells resided. The degree of the damage varied. Some of the wells lost all power or could barely hold their yields and some of the water in wells turned black or began to smell of sulfur.

The most likely cause of the wells drying was because of the increase in hydraulic conductivity or "hydraulic islands" of shale rock under this area caused by the earthquake. The quake affected the existing faults and created new faults in the shale. This created more permeability for the water to leak down from the hilltops on the ridge down to the valleys following the contours of the Meadville shale down to the 14–18 square km area of the valley.

== See also ==
- List of earthquakes in 1998
- List of earthquakes in the United States
