= Southern Great Lakes seismic zone =

The Southern Great Lakes Seismic Zone is a zone of low to moderate seismic activity surrounding Lake Erie and Lake Ontario in Canada and the United States.

== See also ==
- 1998 Pymatuning earthquake
