= James Maclaren =

Canadian businessman (1818–1892)

James Maclaren (March 19, 1818 – February 10, 1892) was an early settler and entrepreneur in western Quebec.

Maclaren was born in Glasgow, Scotland in 1818. He came to Richmond in Upper Canada with his family in 1822. The family then settled in Torobolton Township and then moved to Wakefield in Lower Canada in the 1840s. Maclaren and his brother David opened a general store, grist mill, woollen mill and brick plant in Wakefield. James also became involved in the timber trade.

In 1853, Maclaren leased a sawmill in New Edinburgh from Thomas McKay with partners including Moss Kent Dickinson and Joseph Merrill Currier. By 1861, he was able to buy out his partners and, in 1866, he purchased the mills after McKay's death. In 1864, again with partners, he bought sawmills at Buckingham, later buying out his partners.

Maclaren also helped found the Hull Iron Company in 1880, the North Pacific Lumber Company of British Columbia in 1889, and the Bank of Ottawa, later merged with Scotiabank, in 1874. MacLaren also had business interests in Vermont, Massachusetts, and Michigan.

Maclaren died in Buckingham in 1892.
