= Alleyn-et-Cawood =

- Municipality
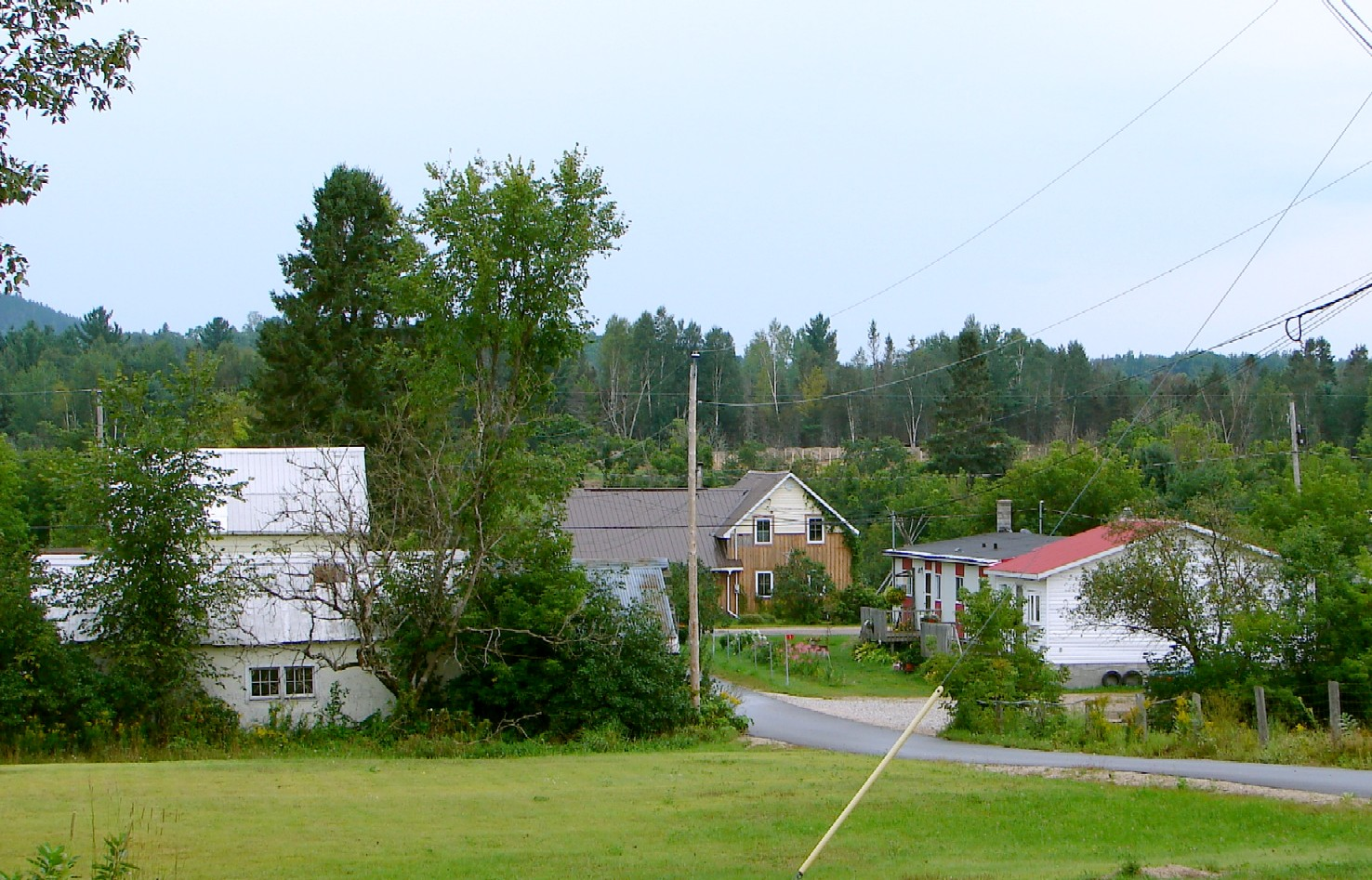
- Danford Lake

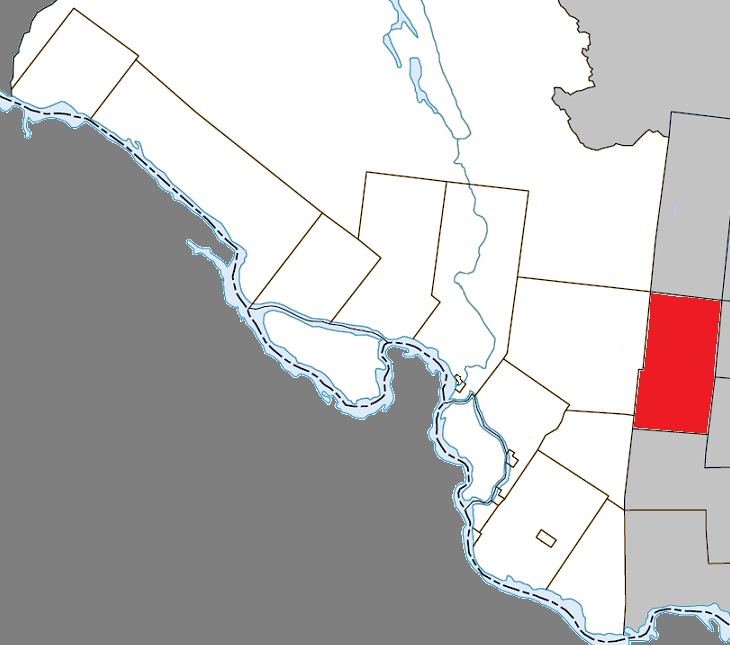
- Location within Pontiac RCM

- Location in western Quebec
- Coordinates: 45°55′N 76°10′W
- Country: Canada
- Province: Quebec
- Region: Outaouais
- RCM: Pontiac
- Constituted: January 1, 1877

Government
  - Mayor: Sidney Squitti
  - Fed. riding: Pontiac—Kitigan Zibi
  - Prov. riding: Pontiac

Area
  - Total: 326.05 km^{2} (125.89 sq mi)
  - Land: 308.91 km^{2} (119.27 sq mi)

Population (2021)
  - Total: 229
  - Density: 0.7/km^{2} (1.8/sq mi)
  - Change (2016–21): ▲33.1%
  - Dwellings: 303
- Time zone: UTC−5 (EST)
  - Summer (DST): UTC−4 (EDT)
- Postal code(s): J0X 1P0
- Area code(s): 819
- Highways: R-301
- Website: www.alleyn-cawood.ca

Alleyn-et-Cawood is a municipality in the Outaouais region, northwest of Gatineau, part of the Pontiac Regional County Municipality, Quebec, Canada. Its main population centre is Danford Lake, located along Route 301.

Highest point in the municipality is Mont O'Brien with an altitude of about 180 metres (590 ft).

== History ==
The municipality is named after the 2 geographic townships that it covers. The Township of Cawood was established in 1861, and named after Cawood in England (first used on a map by Gale and Duberger in 1795 and misspelled as Cadwood for a while). The Township of Alleyn, established in 1864, was named in honour of Charles Joseph Alleyn, a lawyer and politician of Quebec.

The United Township Municipality of Cawood-et-Alleyn was formed in 1876 when it split off from the United Township Municipality of Thorne-Cawood-et-Alleyn (which became the Municipality of Thorne). In 2004, the united township municipality of Alleyn-et-Cawood became the Municipality of Alleyn-et-Cawood.

=== Danford Lake ===
In 1855, the area's first settler was Patrick Danford, after whom the lake and community are named. He was followed by loggers and other settlers, notably William Heeney and his family in 1861. His descendants contributed much to the growth and development of the community. In 1868, the post office opened in Danford Lake, and in 1902, its first general store.

== Demographics ==
Canada census – Alleyn-et-Cawood community profile

	2021	2016	2011
Population	229 (+33.1% from 2016)	172 (2.4% from 2011)	168 (-32.3% from 2006)
Land area	308.91 km^{2} (119.27 sq mi)	314.83 km^{2} (121.56 sq mi)	316.03 km^{2} (122.02 sq mi)
Population density	0.7/km^{2} (1.8/sq mi)	0.5/km^{2} (1.3/sq mi)	0.5/km^{2} (1.3/sq mi)
Median age	58.8 (M: 58.8, F: 58.4)	59.2 (M: 59.2, F: 59.5)	55.1 (M: 55.0, F: 56.0)
Private dwellings	303 (total) 126 (occupied)	281 (total)	126 (total)
Median household income	$.n/a	$35,968	$.n/a

Notes: 2021 and 2011 Income data for this area has been suppressed for data quality or confidentiality reasons.
References: 2021 2016 2011

Historical Census Data - Alleyn-et-Cawood, Quebec

Year	Pop.	±%
1921	341	—
1931	400	+17.3%
1941	397	−0.7%
1951	291	−26.7%
1956	281	−3.4%
1961	219	−22.1%

Year	Pop.	±%
1966	207	−5.5%
1971	168	−18.8%
1976	150	−10.7%
1981	157	+4.7%
1986	167	+6.4%
1991	195	+16.8%

Year	Pop.	±%
1996	185	−5.1%
2001	179	−3.2%
2006	248	+38.5%
2011	168	−32.3%
2016	172	+2.4%
2021	229	+33.1%

Source: Statistics Canada

=== Language ===
Canada Census Mother Tongue - Alleyn-et-Cawood, Quebec
Census	Total	French			English			French & English			Other		
Year	Responses	Count	Trend	Pop %	Count	Trend	Pop %	Count	Trend	Pop %	Count	Trend	Pop %
2021	230	70	▲16.7%	30.4%	145	▲31.8%	63.0%	5	▲ n/a%	2.2%	5	▲ n/a%	2.2%
2016	175	60	▲20.0%	34.3%	110	▼4.3%	62.9%	0	▼100.0%	0.0%	0	▼100.0%	0.0%
2011	170	50	▼23.1%	29.4%	115	▼37.8%	67.6%	5	▲ n/a%	2.9%	5	▲ n/a%	2.9%
2006	250	65	▲550.0%	26.0%	185	▲94.7%	74.0%	0	0.0%	0.0%	0	▼100.0%	0.0%
2001	180	10	▼50.0%	5.6%	95	▼34.5%	52.8%	0	0.0%	0.0%	75	▲ n/a%	41.7%
1996	165	20	n/a	12.1%	145	n/a	87.9%	0	n/a	0.0%	0	n/a	0.0%

== Local government ==
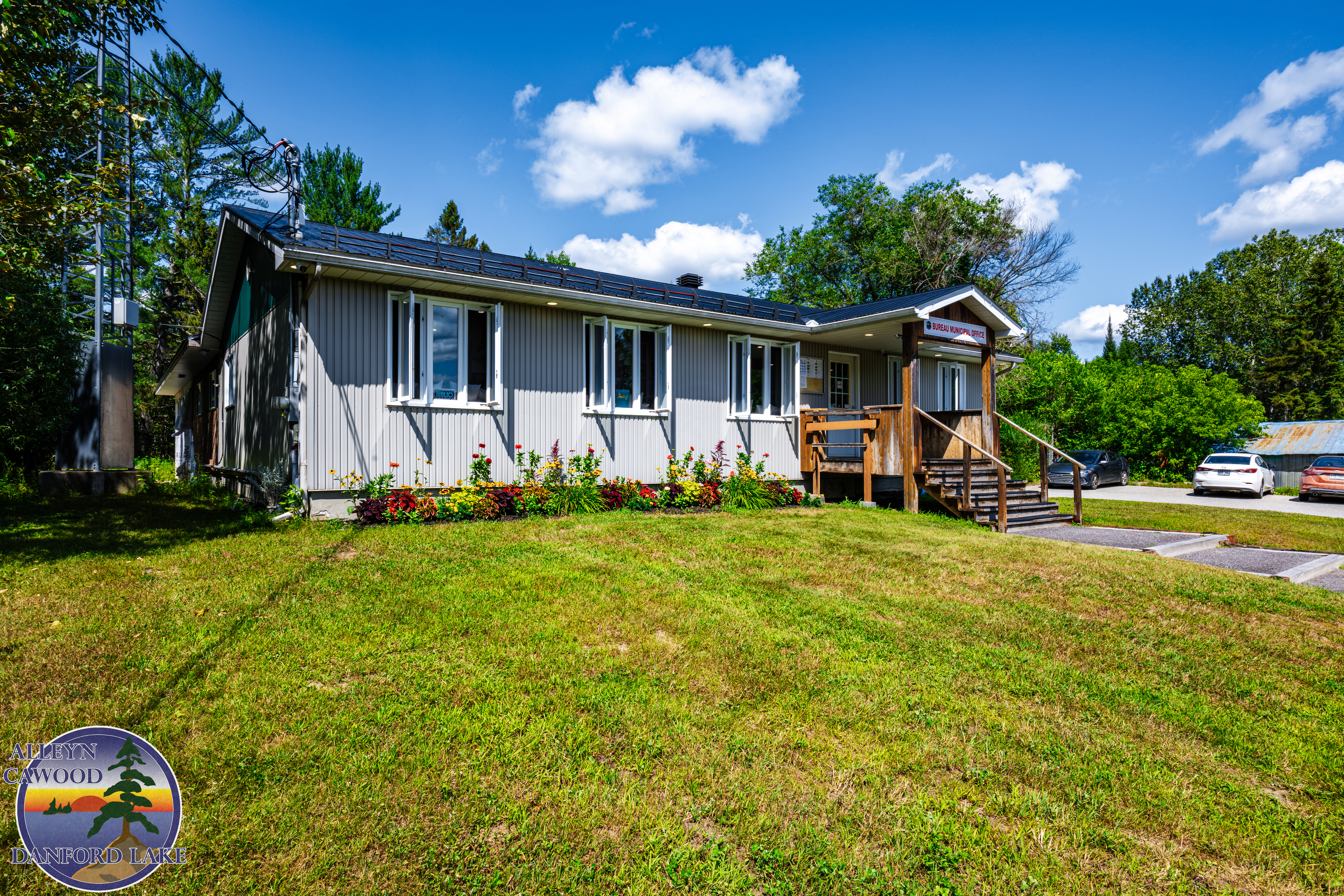
Municipal office

Elected in 2025, the mayor of the municipality is Sidney Squitti.

Alleyn-et-Cawood forms part of the federal electoral district of Pontiac—Kitigan Zibi and has been represented by Sophie Chatel of the Liberal Party since 2021. Provincially, Alleyn-et-Cawood is part of the Pontiac electoral district and is represented by André Fortin of the Quebec Liberal Party since 2014.

Alleyn-et-Cawood federal election results
Year	Liberal		Conservative		Bloc Québécois		New Democratic		Green	
2021	24%	35	53%	79	6%	10	13%	19	3%	5
2019	32%	43	48%	63	8%	10	4%	6	7%	9

Alleyn-et-Cawood provincial election results
Year	CAQ		Liberal		QC solidaire		Parti Québécois	
2018	12%	11	50%	46	4%	4	8%	8
2014	4%	7	92%	161	2%	3	2%	4

List of former mayors:

- Joseph Squitti (2001–2009)
- Charlene Scharf-Lafleur (2009–2013)
- Carl Mayer (2013–2025)
- Sidney Squitti (2025-Present)

== See also ==
- List of anglophone communities in Quebec
- List of municipalities in Quebec
