= Bryson, Quebec =

Bryson
- Municipality
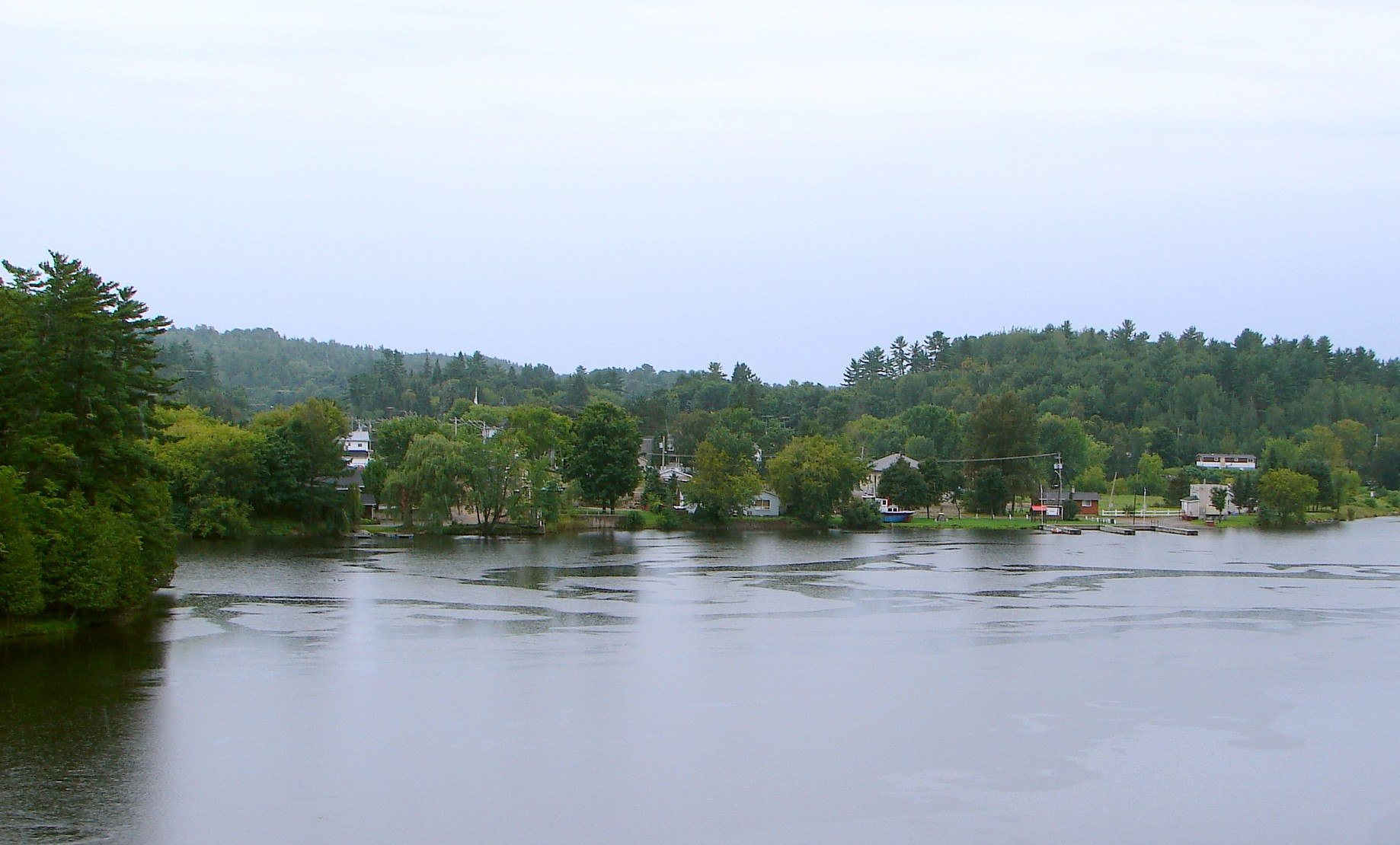

- Location in western Quebec
- Coordinates: 45°40′39″N 76°37′25″W
- Country: Canada
- Province: Quebec
- Region: Outaouais
- RCM: Pontiac
- Constituted: January 1, 1873

Government
  - Mayor: Alain Gagnon
  - Federal riding: Pontiac—Kitigan Zibi
  - Prov. riding: Pontiac

Area
  - Total: 3.72 km^{2} (1.44 sq mi)
  - Land: 3.58 km^{2} (1.38 sq mi)

Population (2021)
  - Total: 646
  - Density: 180.4/km^{2} (467/sq mi)
  - Pop 2016-2021: ▼7.3%
  - Dwellings: 302
- Time zone: UTC−5 (EST)
  - Summer (DST): UTC−4 (EDT)
- Postal code(s): J0X 1H0
- Area code: 819
- Highways: R-148; R-301

Bryson is a village and municipality in the Pontiac Regional County Municipality in the Outaouais region of Quebec, Canada. It is located on the northern bank of the Ottawa River.

== History ==
From 1858 to 1873, the village was called Havelock in honor of British general Henry Havelock (1795-1857). Because another Havelock Township had already been incorporated two years prior in the province of Quebec, Havelock was renamed in 1873 after local lumber baron and politician George Bryson when the Municipality of the Village of Bryson was incorporated.

Bryson was the seat of the county of Pontiac from 1855 to 1916 when the seat was moved to Campbell's Bay. Amongst the reasons to justify the move, the law states that the means of communication with the village were expensive and inconvenient, the roads were in poor condition and often impassable during winter storms and spring freshets, the village was several miles away from the nearest train station (located in Campbell's Bay), and that the village had reduced in importance and in population since a major fire had destroyed a number of residences and businesses as well as the county council's hall.

On December 20, 2004, it changed status from Village Municipality to (regular) Municipality.

== Demographics ==
Canada census – Bryson community profile

	2021	2016	2011
Population	646 (-7.3% from 2016)	697 (7.7% from 2011)	647 (+4.7% from 2006)
Land area	3.58 km^{2} (1.38 sq mi)	3.65 km^{2} (1.41 sq mi)	3.29 km^{2} (1.27 sq mi)
Population density	180.4/km^{2} (467/sq mi)	190.8/km^{2} (494/sq mi)	196.9/km^{2} (510/sq mi)
Median age	45.2 (M: 45.6, F: 45.2)	47.4 (M: 46.9, F: 47.9)	44.4 (M: 41.4, F: 47.2)
Private dwellings	302 (total) 284 (occupied)	357 (total)	301 (total)
Median household income	$66,500	$53,376	$.N/A

Notes: 2011 income data for this area has been suppressed for data quality or confidentiality reasons.
References: 2021 2016 2011

Historical Census Data - Bryson, Quebec

Year	Pop.	±%
1976	837	—
1981	809	−3.3%
1986	787	−2.7%
1991	763	−3.0%
1996	753	−1.3%

Year	Pop.	±%
2001	673	−10.6%
2006	618	−8.2%
2011	647	+4.7%
2016	697	+7.7%
2021	646	−7.3%

Source: Statistics Canada

== Local government ==
List of former mayors:

- Léo Piché (1969–1990)
- James Stewart (2001–2005)
- Albert Davis (2005–2009)
- John Griffin (2009–2013)
- Alain Gagnon (2013–present)

== See also ==
- List of anglophone communities in Quebec
- List of municipalities in Quebec
