= Clarendon, Quebec =

Clarendon
- Municipality
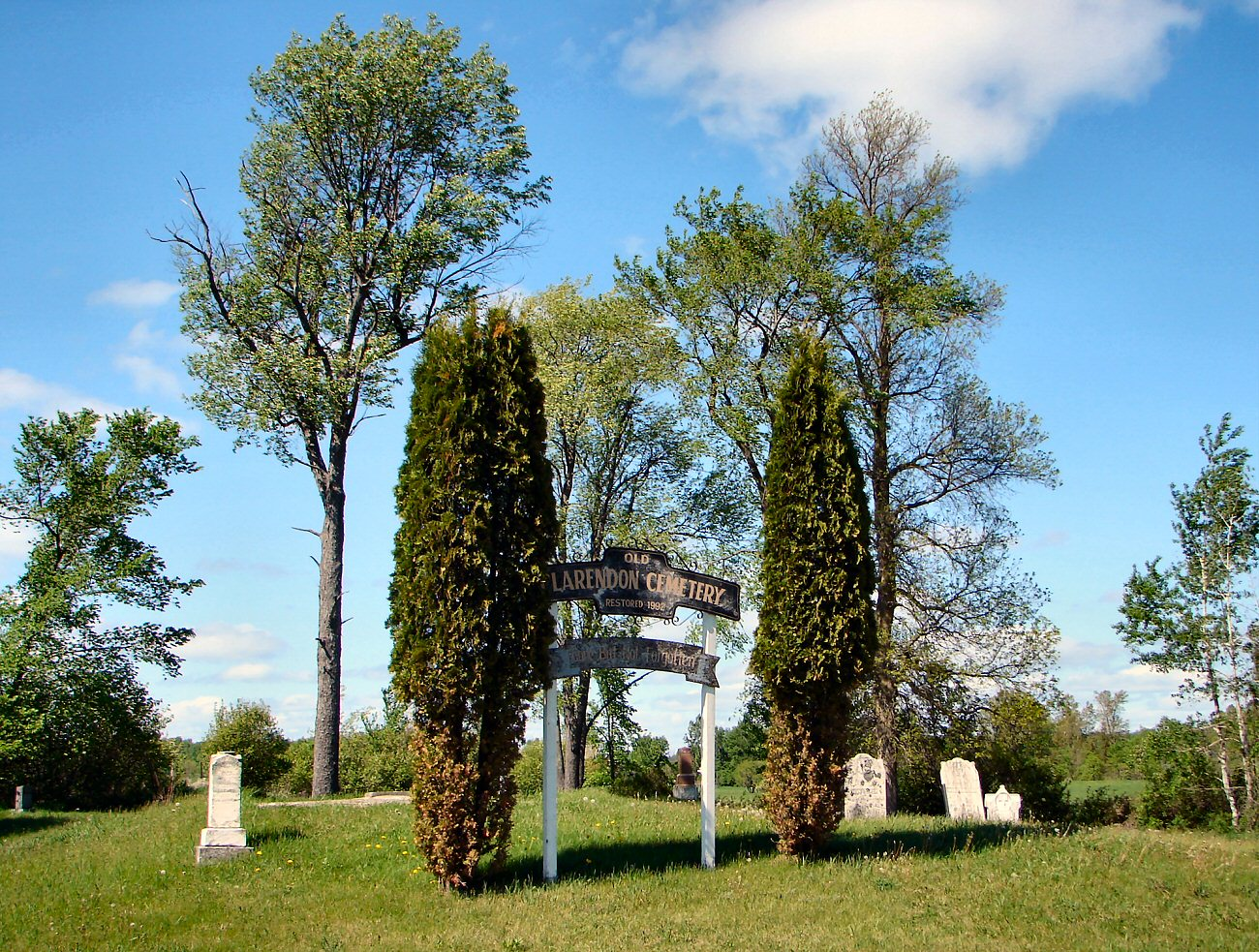
- Historic cemetery on Front Road

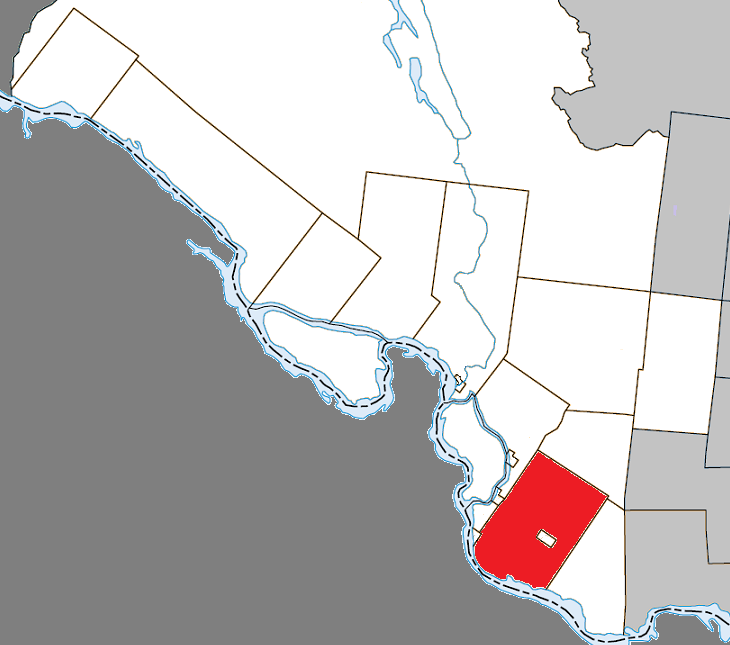
- Location within Pontiac RCM

- Location in western Quebec
- Coordinates: 45°39′N 76°31′W
- Country: Canada
- Province: Quebec
- Region: Outaouais
- RCM: Pontiac
- Constituted: July 1, 1855

Government
  - Mayor: Edward Walsh
  - Federal riding: Pontiac—Kitigan Zibi
  - Prov. riding: Pontiac

Area
  - Total: 347.85 km^{2} (134.31 sq mi)
  - Land: 330.46 km^{2} (127.59 sq mi)
- Elevation: 167 m (548 ft)

Population (2021)
  - Total: 1,392
  - Density: 4.2/km^{2} (11/sq mi)
  - Pop 2016-2021: ▲10.8%
  - Dwellings: 968
- Time zone: UTC−5 (EST)
  - Summer (DST): UTC−4 (EDT)
- Postal code(s): J0X 2Y0
- Area code: 819
- Highways: R-148; R-303
- Website: clarendonqc.ca

Clarendon is a municipality in the Outaouais region, part of the Pontiac Regional County Municipality, Quebec, Canada. It is located on the north shore of the Ottawa River across from Horton Township in Ontario.

Its settlements include Clarendon, North Clarendon, Charteris, Lawn, Murrell, Radford, Sand Bay, Starks Corners, and Yarm. The town of Shawville is surrounded by, but not part of, Clarendon.

Largely cleared of forests, Clarendon is a predominantly agricultural municipality, with an elevation of 167 meters (548 ft) above sea level. The only notable lake is Green Lake, which is surrounded by cottages.

== History ==
The township was first surveyed in 1792 and appears on the Gale and Duberger map of 1795. Settlement did not occur until 1825 when James Prendergast, a retired British Army Officer, was commissioned by the government to lead this task. From that year until 1827, free land was granted, resulting in a wave of settlers, starting with 15 settlers near the township's centre (now Shawville). But Prendergast, originally from religiously-divided Ireland, stipulated that settlers only be Protestants in order to avoid similar religious strife. As a result, Clarendon (and Shawville) is known as the heartland of Anglo-Saxon Protestantism in western Quebec.

Between 1827 and 1835, Prendergast was responsible for establishing the first four schools and bringing in its teachers. He also built a water-driven sawmill and grist mill at his home along the Ottawa River.

In 1833, the Township of Clarendon was officially established. It was named after Clarendon Park, near Salisbury in Wiltshire, England (where Henry II had convened peers and bishops to formulate the Constitutions of Clarendon in 1164). In 1837, the post office opened. From then on and into the 1840s, when the timber industry started to prosper, a second wave of settlement occurred, doubling the population of Clarendon between 1840 and 1850.

In 1855, the Township Municipality of Clarendon was created. This status was reformed to Municipality of Clarendon on October 11, 2003.

== Climate ==
Climate data for Charteris, Quebec (1991−2020 normals, extremes 1980–2020)
Month	Jan	Feb	Mar	Apr	May	Jun	Jul	Aug	Sep	Oct	Nov	Dec	Year
Record high °C (°F)	12.0 (53.6)	13.7 (56.7)	27.5 (81.5)	32.0 (89.6)	34.5 (94.1)	35.5 (95.9)	36.0 (96.8)	36.5 (97.7)	35.5 (95.9)	28.3 (82.9)	22.1 (71.8)	15.5 (59.9)	36.5 (97.7)
Mean daily maximum °C (°F)	−6.2 (20.8)	−4.2 (24.4)	2.2 (36.0)	10.8 (51.4)	19.3 (66.7)	23.9 (75.0)	26.4 (79.5)	25.1 (77.2)	20.4 (68.7)	12.4 (54.3)	4.8 (40.6)	−2.6 (27.3)	11.0 (51.8)
Daily mean °C (°F)	−11.6 (11.1)	−10.2 (13.6)	−3.7 (25.3)	5.1 (41.2)	12.5 (54.5)	17.4 (63.3)	19.6 (67.3)	18.6 (65.5)	14.3 (57.7)	7.5 (45.5)	0.7 (33.3)	−7.0 (19.4)	5.3 (41.5)
Mean daily minimum °C (°F)	−16.9 (1.6)	−16.1 (3.0)	−9.5 (14.9)	−1.2 (29.8)	5.5 (41.9)	10.6 (51.1)	13.1 (55.6)	12.2 (54.0)	7.9 (46.2)	2.3 (36.1)	−3.8 (25.2)	−11.3 (11.7)	−0.6 (30.9)
Record low °C (°F)	−42.0 (−43.6)	−36.5 (−33.7)	−35.0 (−31.0)	−19.5 (−3.1)	−8.7 (16.3)	−2.0 (28.4)	2.0 (35.6)	−1.0 (30.2)	−5.5 (22.1)	−12.5 (9.5)	−28.0 (−18.4)	−38.0 (−36.4)	−42.0 (−43.6)
Average snowfall cm (inches)	41.5 (16.3)	35.1 (13.8)	30.9 (12.2)	8.3 (3.3)	0.2 (0.1)	0.0 (0.0)	0.0 (0.0)	0.0 (0.0)	0.0 (0.0)	2.2 (0.9)	19.4 (7.6)	44.9 (17.7)	182.4 (71.8)
Average snowy days (≥ 0.2 cm)	13.3	10.4	7.2	2.3	0.15	0.0	0.0	0.0	0.0	0.61	5.0	11.6	50.5
Source: Environment and Climate Change Canada

== Demographics ==
=== Population ===
Canada census – Clarendon community profile

	2021	2016	2011
Population	1,392 (+10.8% from 2016)	1,256 (6.2% from 2011)	1,183 (-5.2% from 2006)
Land area	330.46 km^{2} (127.59 sq mi)	333.37 km^{2} (128.71 sq mi)	334.53 km^{2} (129.16 sq mi)
Population density	4.2/km^{2} (11/sq mi)	3.8/km^{2} (9.8/sq mi)	3.5/km^{2} (9.1/sq mi)
Median age	50.8 (M: 50.8, F: 50.4)	51.4 (M: 51.40, F: 51.4)	47.9 (M: 48.2, F: 47.7)
Private dwellings	968 (total) 615 (occupied)	924 (total)	806 (total)
Median household income	$65,500	$50,517	$40,187

References: 2021 2016 2011

Historical Census Data - Clarendon, Quebec

Year	Pop.	±%
1976	1,662	—
1981	1,519	−8.6%
1986	1,468	−3.4%
1991	1,489	+1.4%
1996	1,474	−1.0%

Year	Pop.	±%
2001	1,340	−9.1%
2006	1,248	−6.9%
2011	1,183	−5.2%
2016	1,256	+6.2%
2021	1,392	+10.8%

Source: Statistics Canada

=== Language ===
Mother tongue:

- English as first language: 82%
- French as first language: 14%
- Other languages: 1.4%

== See also ==
- List of anglophone communities in Quebec
- List of municipalities in Quebec
