= Waltham, Quebec =

Waltham
- Municipality
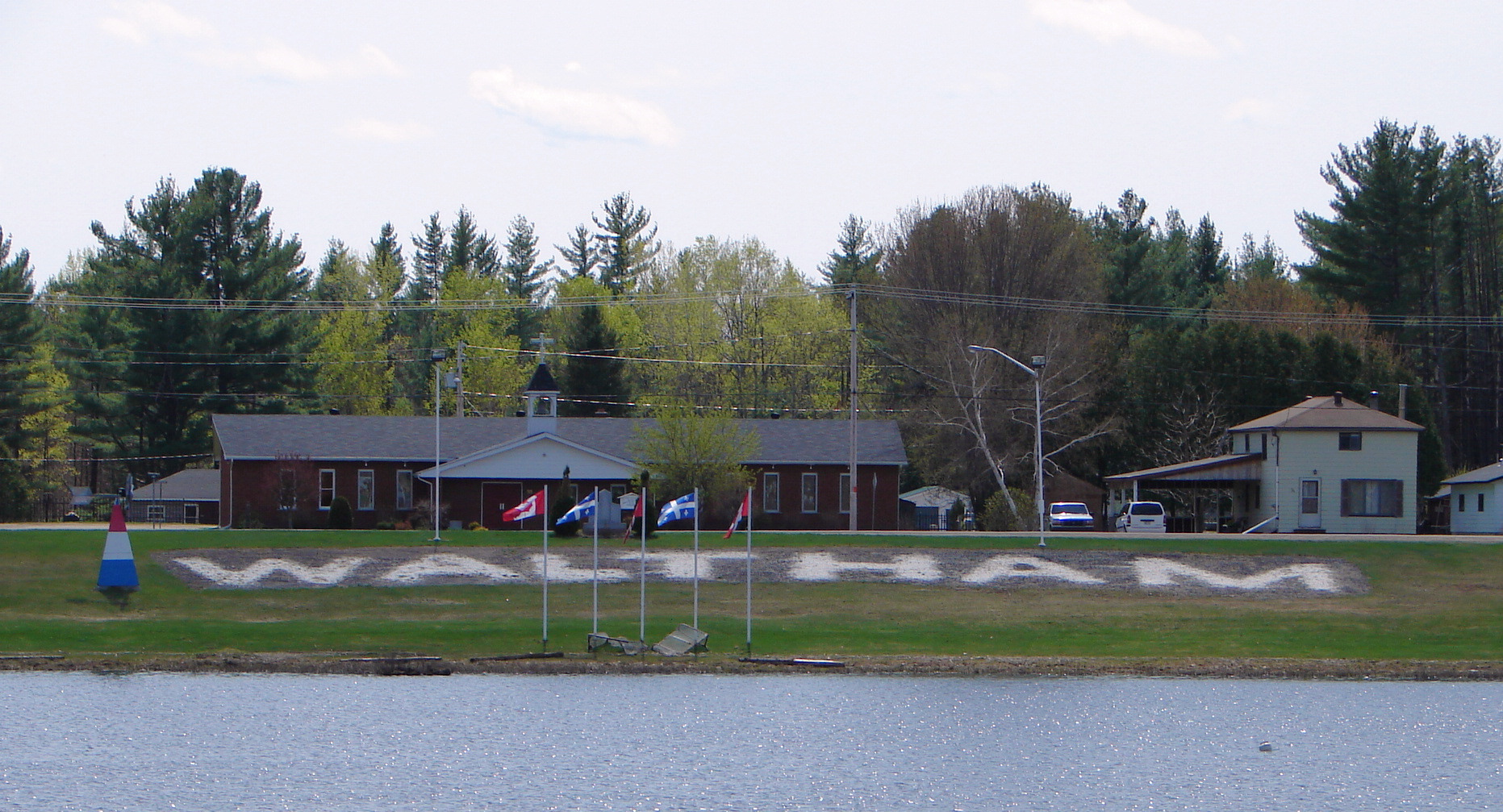

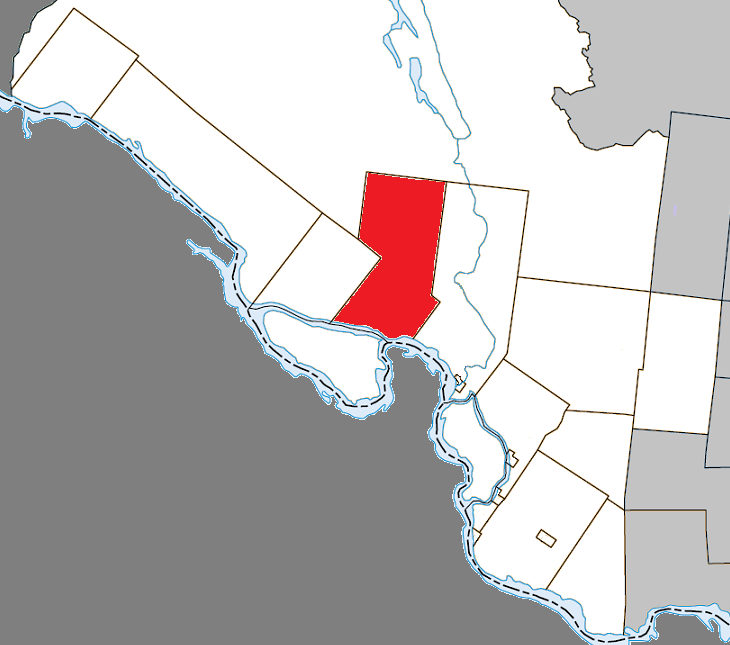
- Location within Pontiac RCM

- Location in western Quebec
- Coordinates: 45°55′N 76°55′W
- Country: Canada
- Province: Quebec
- Region: Outaouais
- RCM: Pontiac
- Constituted: January 1, 1859

Government
  - Mayor: Jordan Evans
  - Federal riding: Pontiac—Kitigan Zibi
  - Prov. riding: Pontiac

Area
  - Total: 402.87 km^{2} (155.55 sq mi)
  - Land: 360.19 km^{2} (139.07 sq mi)

Population (2021)
  - Total: 387
  - Density: 1.1/km^{2} (2.8/sq mi)
  - Pop 2016-2021: ▲2.4%
  - Dwellings: 232
- Time zone: UTC−5 (EST)
  - Summer (DST): UTC−4 (EDT)
- Postal code(s): J0X 3H0
- Area code: 819
- Highways: R-148
- Website: www.municipalitedewaltham.ca

Waltham, also known as Waltham Station, is a village and municipality in the Outaouais region, Quebec, Canada, part of the Pontiac Regional County Municipality. It is located at the mouth of the Noire River, along the north shore of the Ottawa River at Allumette Island.

== Geography ==
The municipality consists of the hamlet of Carroll and the village of Waltham, both near the Ottawa River between Chichester and Mansfield-et-Pontefract, about 30 kilometres (19 mi) west of Fort-Coulonge. Quebec Route 148 connects Waltham to Allumettes Island and Pembroke, Ontario.

Its territory, with a maximum elevation of just over 350 metres (1,150 ft), is sparsely populated, the majority of the population living along or near the Ottawa River. The northern portion is a vast extended tract of undeveloped land, dotted with lakes, such as Findlay, Landon, Gagnon, and Caughlin, which are popular for fishing.

== History ==
The name Waltham, mentioned on the Gale and Duberger map of 1795, comes from a place on the River Lea in Essex, England, named Waltham Abbey. In 1849, the Waltham Township was formed. In 1859, it was officially reorganized into a township municipality, also named Waltham, and its first mayor was John T. Coghlan.

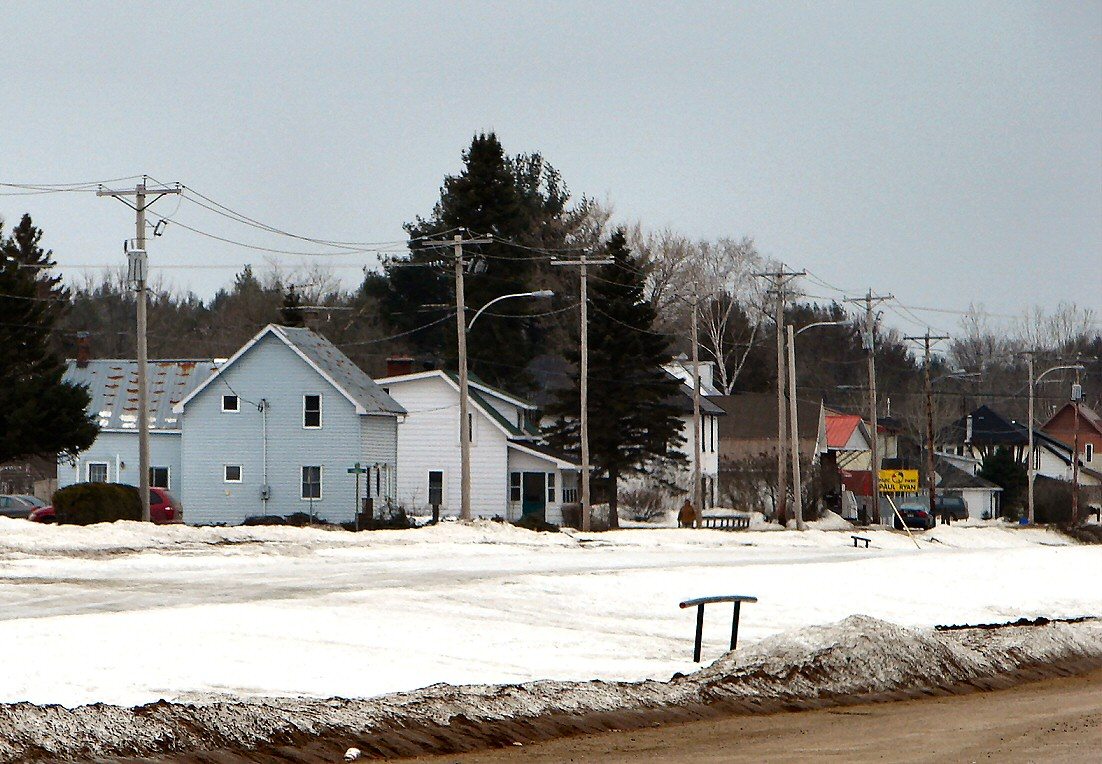
Winter view

In 1869, the Bryson Township was annexed, creating the United Township Municipality of Waltham-et-Bryson. The name Bryson comes from George Bryson Sr. (1813–1900), influential logging merchant, and mayor of Mansfield-et-Pontefract. In 1888, the railroad from Fort-Coulonge to Waltham was completed but not until August 27, 1894, was the railroad opened by the Pontiac Pacific Junction Railway Company. Four years later, in 1898, a post office was established, called Waltham Station.

In 1937, a hydroelectric generating station and dam were built across the Noire River just north of Waltham village, forming a reservoir called Robinson Lake.

In 1954, the Waltham Lumber Mill & Dry Kilns were built. It was designed by Brodie Gillies to run all year round producing hardwood lumber and commenced operation March 7, 1955. It produced 6 million board feet annually with 40 employees.

In 1959, rail service to Waltham was discontinued, and in 1984 the railline was removed and later turned into the Cycloparc PPJ bike path stretching from Bristol, Quebec, to Pembroke, Ontario.

In 1997, Waltham-et-Bryson was reorganized into the Municipality of Waltham.

In 2007, the wood drying kilns at the town's lumberyard caught fire and closed. The property now serves as a storage site for a tree planting company.

In 2009, Waltham celebrated its 150th birthday.

== Demographics ==
=== Population ===
Canada census – Waltham, Quebec community profile

	2021	2016	2011
Population	387 (+2.4% from 2016)	378 (-1.6% from 2011)	384 (6.7% from 2006)
Land area	360.19 km^{2} (139.07 sq mi)	374.22 km^{2} (144.49 sq mi)	375.71 km^{2} (145.06 sq mi)
Population density	1.1/km^{2} (2.8/sq mi)	1.0/km^{2} (2.6/sq mi)	1.0/km^{2} (2.6/sq mi)
Median age	51.6 (M: 51.2, F: 51.6)	50.2 (M: 51.2, F: 48.5)	48.5 (M: 49.4, F: 47.2)
Private dwellings	232 (total)	222 (total)	226 (total)
Median household income	$54,800	$51,840	$51,889

References: 2021 2016 2011

Historical Census Data - Waltham, Quebec

Year	Pop.	±%
1976	466	—
1981	454	−2.6%
1986	479	+5.5%
1991	466	−2.7%
1996	496	+6.4%

Year	Pop.	±%
2001	425	−14.3%
2006	360	−15.3%
2011	384	+6.7%
2016	378	−1.6%
2021	387	+2.4%

Source: Statistics Canada

=== Language ===
Mother tongue:

- English as first language: 81.8%
- French as first language: 13.0%
- English and French as first language: 3.9%
- Other as first language: 1.3%

== 1996 UFO Landing ==
On March 19, 1996, a UFO was reported to have landed in the town's lumberyard. "According to Hector Brochu, a witness of the event, he watched the object, which was described as a diamond shape, 2-1/2 feet high and 2 feet wide, fall to the ground like a feather. It made no noise whatsoever, and was very shiny, as if made of foil. There were no markings whatsoever. The object had what appeared to be a "bulb of mercury" hanging from it. When Brochu got within 10 feet of the object, which he was going to bring home for his daughter, the object rose into the air and remained in a fixed position approximately 150' in the air. Brochu, who ran when the object rose into the air, is 60 years old. The object had landed in a lumber yard. Brochu was able to get 8 people who all saw the object, which remained stationary for about 10 minutes and then left and landed again in what witnesses described as Alouette [sic] Island in the Ottawa River."

In 2016, unexplained blue and red lights were reported in the sky near Waltham, hovering over the Waltham bridge for 20+ minutes.

In 2021, the Waltham UFO Society was established.

== See also ==
- List of anglophone communities in Quebec
- List of municipalities in Quebec
