= Portage-du-Fort =

- Village municipality
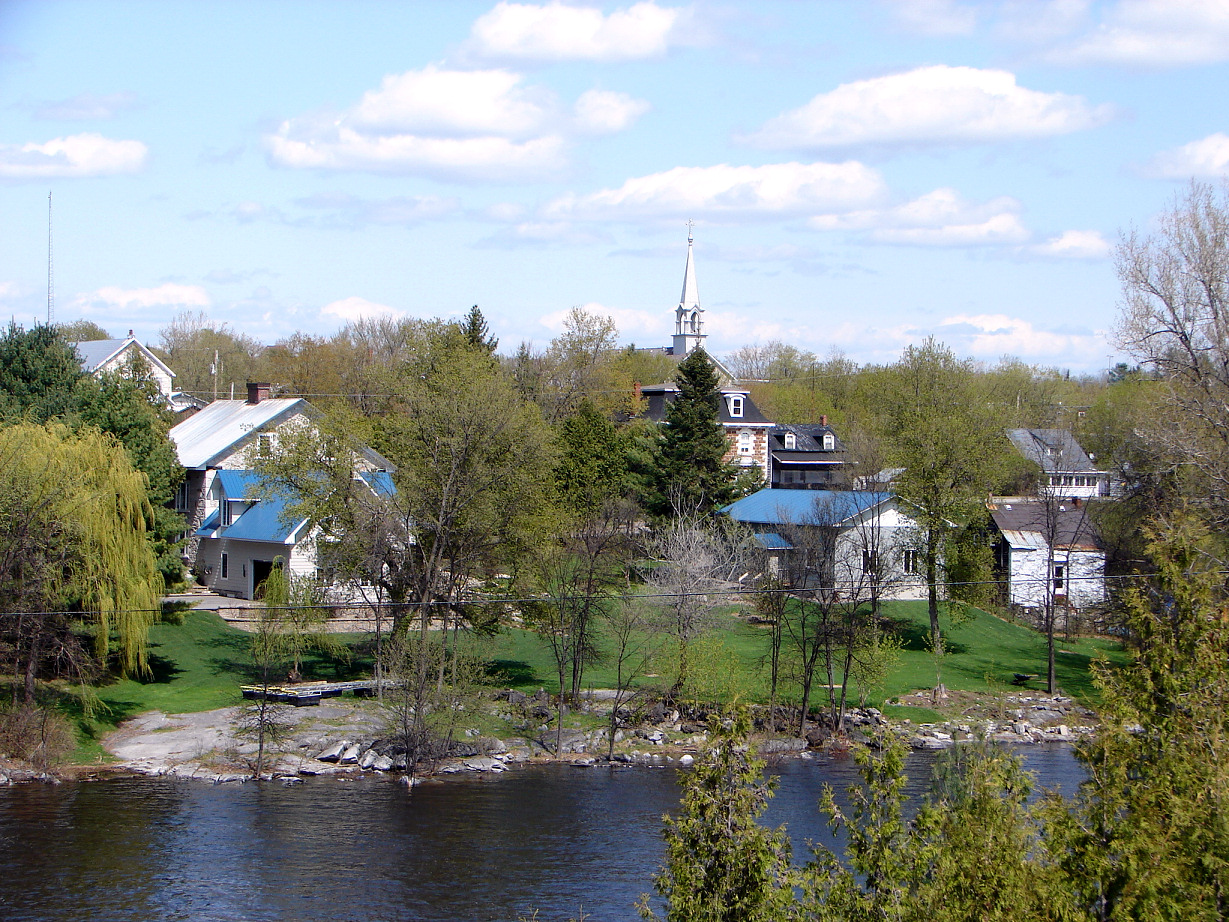

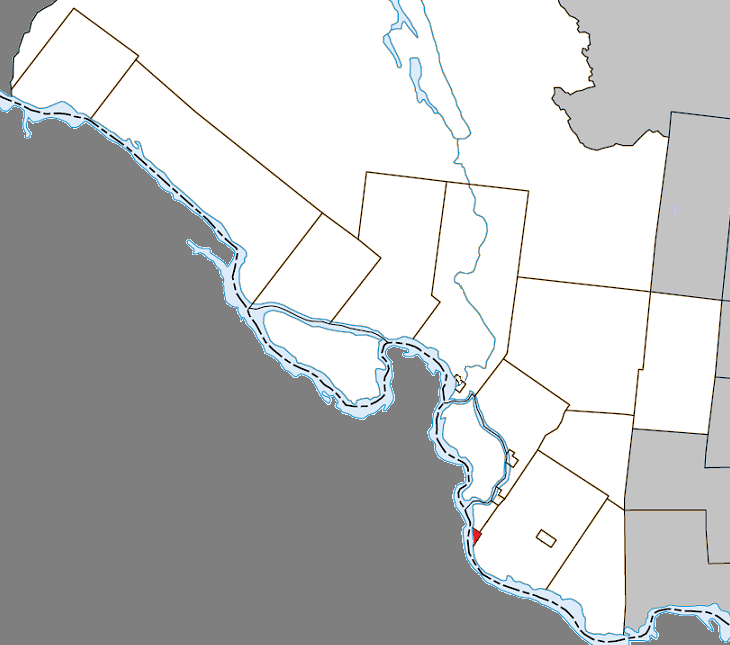
- Location within Pontiac RCM

- Location in western Quebec
- Coordinates: 45°35′50″N 76°30′50″W
- Country: Canada
- Province: Quebec
- Region: Outaouais
- RCM: Pontiac
- Settled: 1844
- Constituted: January 1, 1863

Government
  - Mayor: Lynne Cameron
  - Federal riding: Pontiac—Kitigan Zibi
  - Prov. riding: Pontiac

Area
  - Total: 4.24 km^{2} (1.64 sq mi)
  - Land: 4.22 km^{2} (1.63 sq mi)

Population (2021)
  - Total: 232
  - Density: 55/km^{2} (140/sq mi)
  - Pop (2016-21): ▼0.9%
  - Dwellings: 146
- Time zone: UTC−5 (EST)
  - Summer (DST): UTC−4 (EDT)
- Postal code(s): J0X 2T0
- Area code: 819
- Highways: R-301; R-303
- Website: portage-du-fort.com

Portage-du-Fort (French pronunciation: [pɔʁtaʒ dy fɔʁ]) is a village municipality in the Pontiac Regional County Municipality in the southwest corner of the Outaouais region of Quebec, Canada. The village lies across the Ottawa River from Chenaux, Ontario and Horton, Ontario.

At Portage-du-Fort there is a dam, the Chenaux Hydro-Electric Power Station, and bridge across the Ottawa River.

== Toponymy ==
Portage-du-Fort is named after the portage trail which started here and would lead upstream around a set of falls on the Ottawa River.

However, there are several hypotheses to explain the "Fort" portion. Among the most popular is the assumption that a fort was present here on the shore of the Ottawa River to keep provisions at the portage. It has been claimed that a fort called Dufort was flooded in the rapids at this location. However, some researchers argue that the fort in question has never existed and may be a reference to another fort at the mouth of the Coulonge River (after which modern Fort-Coulonge is named). Moreover, the word formerly did not always convey a military connotation and could be more or less synonymous with a village or hamlet, or even a post or warehouse which was fortified.

One theory suggests that the name goes back to a custom of the Algonquins who would paint their bodies here and it was originally named Portage du Fard (French for "make-up"), which changed into "Fort".

Another possibility is that Fort (French also for "strong") makes reference to the strength needed to haul the heavy canoes and supplies over the arduous portage.

But there is no certainty on any of these theories.

== History ==
In 1611, a French scout named Nicolas de Vignau arrived at this site together with a group of Algonquins while on their way to Allumette Island. From here they had to portage around a series of 5 difficult waterfalls on the Ottawa River. The portage from Harbor Square to Bentley's Landing is one of the oldest trails in North America because the Native peoples inhabiting the valley have used it for thousands of years.

In 1694, Louis d'Ailleboust, Sieur de Coulonge, established a fur trading post near the mouth of the Coulonge River. Subsequently, the long portage around the falls that led to Fort Coulonge became known as "le portage du fort". But the site was only periodically inhabited, based on travel periods, especially in spring and early summer.

In the early 19th century timber slides were built around the falls, allowing loggers easy access to Pontiac County and Portage-du-Fort became the hub for all traffic connected with the lumber industry.

The first real settlers came in 1844, the year when the village was surveyed. In 1847, the post office opened and Henry Osborne built a depot with storehouse to supply the lumber industry further inland. On September 19, 1855, Portage-du-Fort became the county seat with Patrick Fox as its first mayor and warden.

A memorial of Lady Head's visit to the Upper Ottawa, in a bark canoe, in 1856, stands at Portage-du-Fort, Quebec. She was the wife of Sir Edmund Walker Head, 8th Baronet. Portage du Fort was home to the area's first newspaper, the Pontiac Pioneer and Portage du Fort Advertiser, which was published by G.E. White from 1855 to 1865.

From 1860 onward, Portage-du-Fort was an important centre of the Pontiac with its mills, its train station, and its terminus for steam boats carrying grain and wood.

This prosperity led to the creation of the municipality in 1863 when it separated from the municipality of Litchfield Township. That same year Stanislas Drapeau wrote:

The Portage-du-Fort is the meeting place for men involved in the timber trade, and serves as the granery for provisions brought by steam vessels which travel on Lac des Chats for the many sites located in the interior. This post is without doubt a very interesting place and already has the looks of a large village which it will soon be in a few years, one of the most important of the entire Outaouais region.

However, a serious fire in 1914 almost destroyed the place entirely and curbed its development for many years. Further decline came when the Canadian Northern Railway bypassed the village.

In 1950, the Chenaux hydroelectric power plant and dam were built.

== Demographics ==
In the 2021 Census of Population conducted by Statistics Canada, Portage-du-Fort had a population of 232 living in 110 of its 146 total private dwellings, a change of −0.9% from its 2016 population of 234. With a land area of 4.22 km^{2} (1.63 sq mi), it had a population density of 55.0/km^{2} (142.4/sq mi) in 2021.

Canada census – Portage-du-Fort community profile

	2021	2016	2011
Population	232 (-0.9% from 2016)	234 (-12.0% from 2011)	266 (-5.0% from 2006)
Land area	4.22 km^{2} (1.63 sq mi)	4.23 km^{2} (1.63 sq mi)	4.36 km^{2} (1.68 sq mi)
Population density	55.0/km^{2} (142/sq mi)	55.3/km^{2} (143/sq mi)	61.0/km^{2} (158/sq mi)
Median age	45.6 (M: 40.0, F: 50.4)	49.2 (M: 43.0, F: 51.0)	47.8 (M: 47.5, F: 48.0)
Private dwellings	146 (total)	150 (total)	152 (total)
Median household income	$.N/A	$40,960	$.N/A

Notes: 2021 and 2011 income data for this area has been suppressed for data quality or confidentiality reasons.
References: 2021 2016 2011

Historical Census Data - Portage-du-Fort, Quebec

Year	Pop.	±%
1976	390	—
1981	360	−7.7%
1986	337	−6.4%
1991	295	−12.5%
1996	289	−2.0%

Year	Pop.	±%
2001	255	−11.8%
2006	280	+9.8%
2011	266	−5.0%
2016	234	−12.0%
2021	232	−0.9%

Source: Statistics Canada

Mother tongue (2016):

- English as first language: 87.2%
- French as first language: 10.6%
- Other as first language: none

== Local government ==
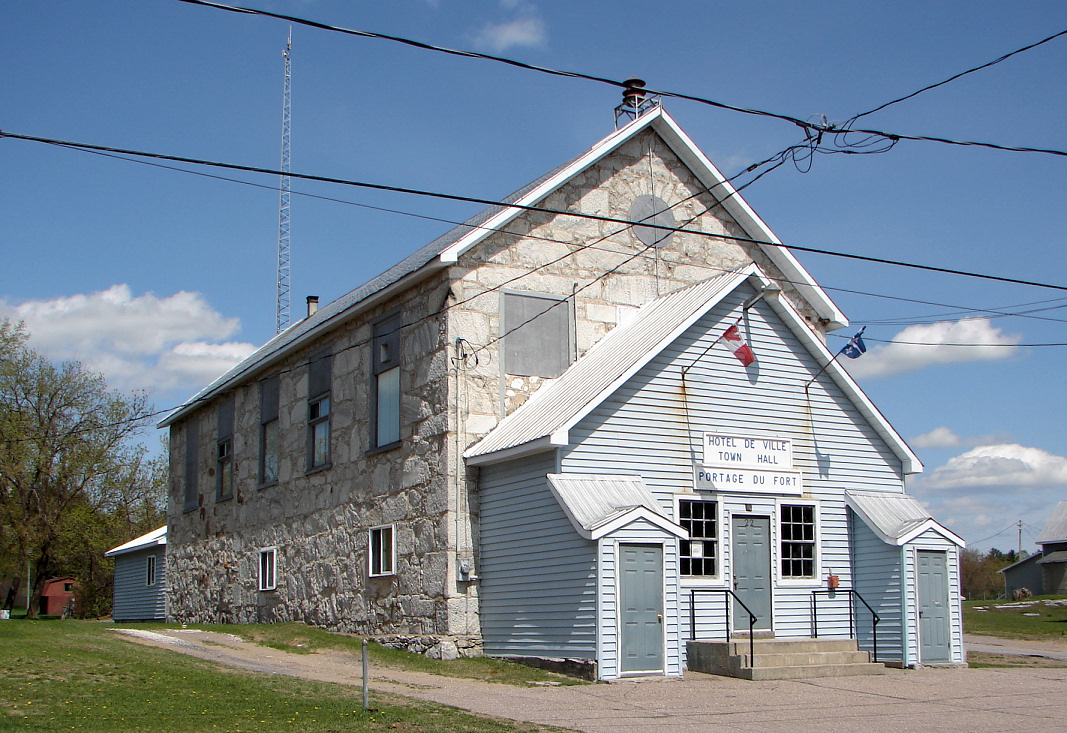
Town hall of Portage-du-Fort

List of former mayors:

- Gérald Manwell (2001–2009)
- Lynne Cameron (2009–2025)
- Kevin Murphy (2025–Present)

== See also ==
- List of anglophone communities in Quebec
- List of village municipalities in Quebec
