= Esprit Lodge =

Building in Fort-Coulonge, Quebec, Canada

Esprit Lodge & Rafting
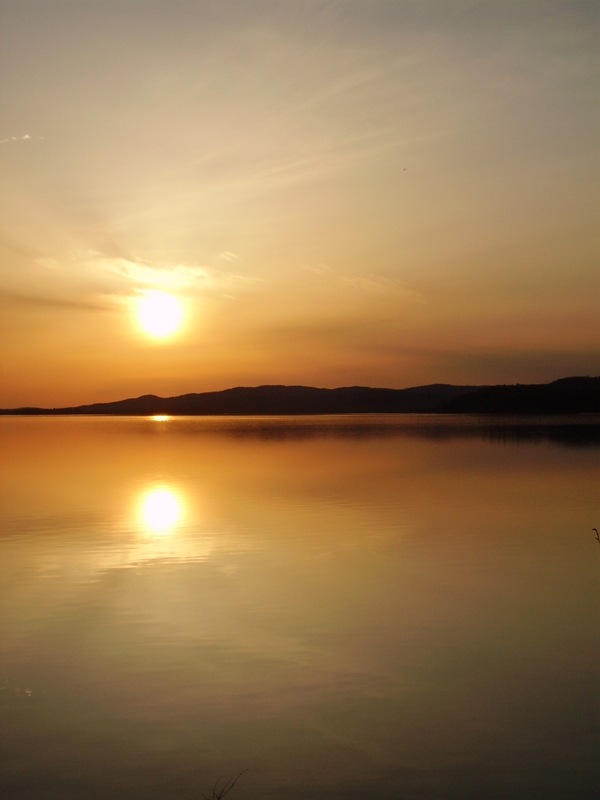
- Sunset view from deck of Esprit International Hostel overlooking the Ottawa River
- Interactive map of the Esprit Lodge & Rafting area

General information
- Location: The Pointe, Fort-Coulonge, Quebec
- Coordinates: Espirit Lodge is at 45°52′44.40″N 76°47′45.60″W
- Opening: 1992
- Owner: Jim Coffey
- Affiliation: Hostelling International

Other information
- Number of rooms: 36 beds
- Number of restaurants: 1?
- Number of bars: 1?
- Parking: Yes

Website
- whitewater.ca

Esprit Lodge & Rafting is a lodge and hostel accommodation near Fort Coulonge, a village in the Pontiac Regional County Municipality in Quebec, Canada. It is used in conjunction with whitewater rafting tours offered by the company. The main lodge was destroyed in a fire in 2016; however, the company has acquired additional accommodation options.

== About the general area ==
Jesuit settler Father Dablon, superior of the missions of the Upper Algonkin in 1670, made note of the importance of the area with respect to the many tribes of the aboriginal Ottawa peoples who inhabited the region.

Originally, the area prospered as a logging settlement, but in the years since 1982, when the last of the log drives occurred, ecotourism and white water rafting have become the prominent attractions for travelers here. Adventure guides from Esprit Lodge lead tours of the region including the Coulonge Chutes and along the Cycloparc PPJ, a major eastern Canadian hiking and bicycle trail.

The area is rich in history with respect to the French settlement of Canada and was written about and explored by early Jesuit missionaries who noted the tradition and heritage of canoeing via the Ottawa River.

"Father Le Mercier (Jes. Rel. 1654), speaking of a flotilla of canoes from the "upper nations," says that they were "partly Ondataouaouat, of the Algonquine language, whom we call les Cheueux Releuez." And in the Relation for 1665 the same Father says of the Ottawa that they were better merchants than warriors."

— Claude Bélanger, The Quebec History Encyclopedia

Esprit Rafting was selected as the 'second best outfitter on Earth' by National Geographic Adventure magazine.

== Activities, education, certification & training ==
In addition to rafting trips and canoeing outfitting services provided in the region, Esprit Lodge is the only hostel accommodation in Canada offering Wilderness first aid (Kayak) and Swiftwater rescue courses and accreditation. Students from around the world travel here to learn hands-on techniques about sustainable travel through instructors and staff who encourage an adherence to the principles of Leave No Trace.

Some rivers used for training, education and exploration purposes include the Ottawa River, Petawawa, Magnetawan, Gatineau and Kipawa.

Specific levels of instruction and certification programs include: Wilderness First Responder, Whitewater Rescue Technician (WRT 1) - Level 1, Swiftwater Rescue Level 1 (SRT 1) and Level 2 (SRT 2), Riverboarding, Guide Training Level 1 and ORCA Moving water.

== History ==
Esprit Rafting launched in 1992, having received a loan from Société d'aide au développement des collectivités (S.A.D.C.) as part of a regional effort to promote economic development in Canadian rural areas through business loans. Since that time, Esprit has become internationally known for adventure travel expeditions throughout the Ottawa River system, Chile, Costa Rica and other destinations.

The proprietors of Esprit Lodge operate several micro-philanthropy ventures in Jalcomulco, Mexico, concentrating on promoting the core values of ecotourism. Locally, the Hermanos project has resulted in the establishment of the first community Internet café, a photo business, a rafting company along with Esprit's winter operation employing local adventure guides and a museum.

Esprit Lodge has hosted numerous significant adventure races, including one of the first Raid the North adventure races in 1999, the Canadian Adventure Racing Championship in 2005, and many other events in partnership with Frontier Adventure Sports, Canada's leading adventure race provider.

On May 20, 2016 a fire broke out inside the lodge resulting in the building being completely destroyed. Esprit continues to operate on the property, delivering whitewater tours as well as offering camping and cabin accommodations on the property.

== Transportation ==
Travel to Esprit is via the provincial Quebec Route 148, the Cycloparc PPJ bicycle trail or by the Ottawa River itself.

== See also ==
- Hostel
- Outdoor education
- Kayaking
- Rafting
- Adventure travel
- Tourism in Canada
