= Noire River (Ottawa River tributary) =

Noire River Black River
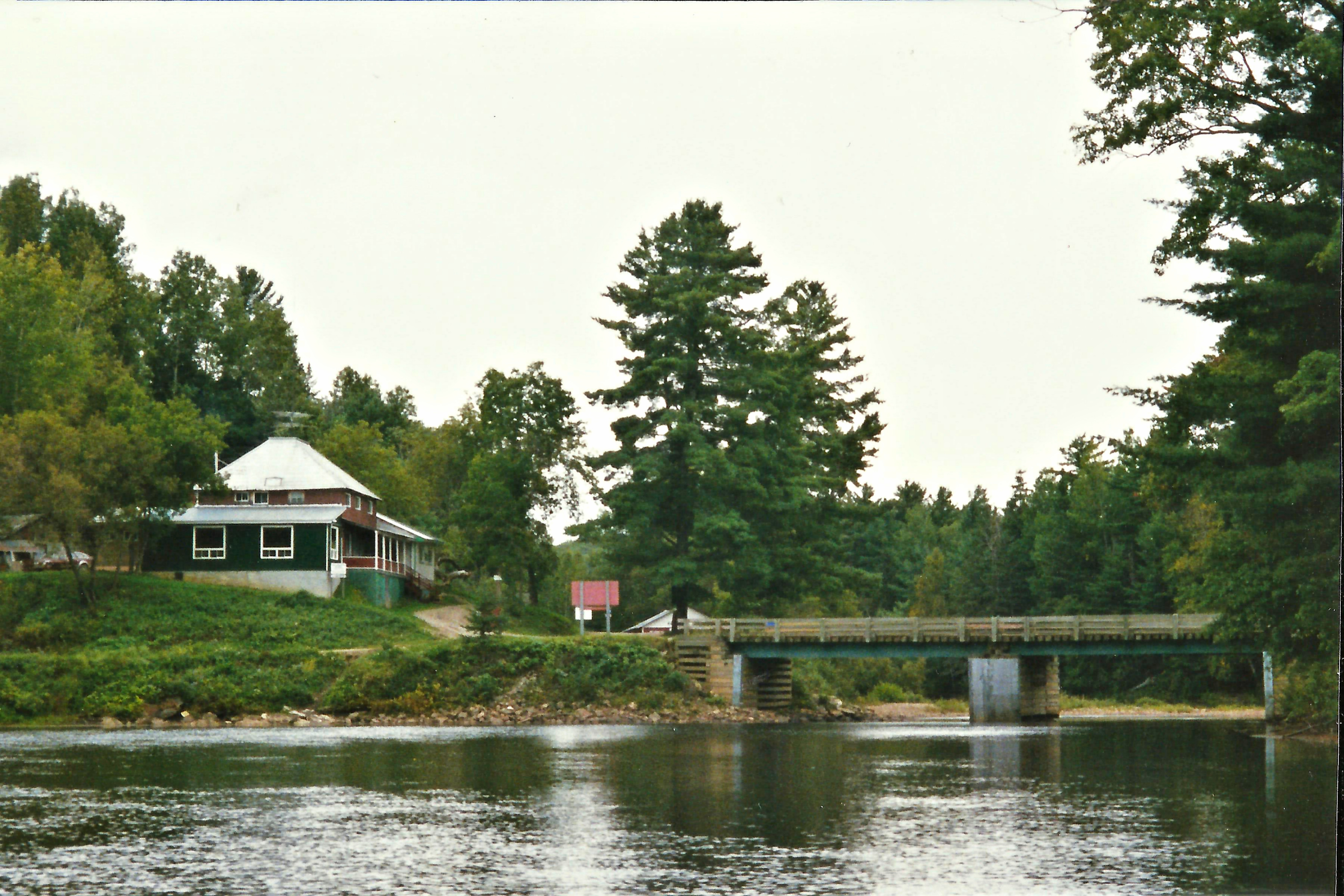
- Black River Inn on the lower Noire River

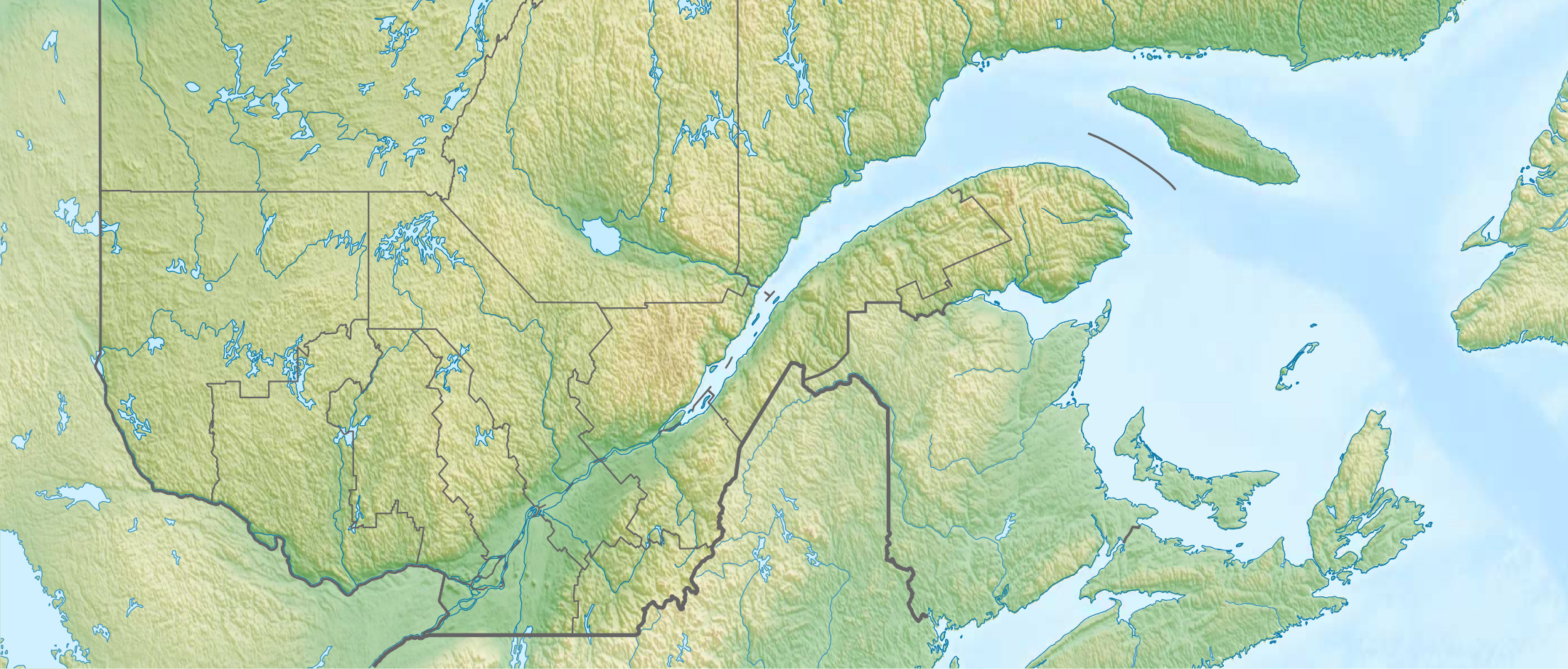
- Location within Quebec South
- Native name: Rivière Noire (French)

Location
- Country: Canada
- Province: Quebec
- Region: Outaouais
- District: Pontiac RCM

Physical characteristics
- Source: Unnamed location
  - location: Lac-Nilgaut, Quebec
  - coordinates: 46°56′20″N 77°26′32″W
- Mouth: Ottawa River
  - location: Waltham, Quebec
  - coordinates: 45°54′26″N 76°56′37″W
- Length: 238 km (148 mi)
- Basin size: 2,668 km^{2} (1,030 sq mi)
- Discharge
  - average: 37.52 m^{3}/s (1,325 cu ft/s)

Basin features
- Progression: Ottawa River→ St. Lawrence River→ Gulf of St. Lawrence
- River system: Ottawa River drainage basin

The Noire River (also known as the Black River or Rivière Noire in French) is a river in western Quebec, Canada. It runs in a south-eastern direction into the Ottawa River at Waltham, Quebec. It is named after the dark colour of its water (noire is French for "Black").

This river is often grouped together with the Dumoine and Coulonge Rivers as three of a kind. All three are in the same area, have similar characteristics, and are popular with whitewater canoers.

A landmark on the lower Noire River was the Black River Inn. Built during the boom of the log driving era in the early 20th century, the inn was a bustling depot for lumberjacks at that time. Afterwards, it catered to outdoor tourism as an outfitter for hunting, fishing, and canoeing along the Noire River. The Black River Inn burnt down on March 6, 2021.

== Geography ==
The Noire River springs from an unnamed location in wilderness just south of La Vérendrye Wildlife Reserve. It flows through Quebec's portion of the Canadian Shield and is marked by sections of rocky whitewater alternated by meandering sections through sand valleys.

Typical trees in this area are Black Spruce, Jack Pine, Eastern White Pine, Red Pine, juniper, alder, and birch. The river is undeveloped except the last 30 km (19 mi), where cottages and even an inn line the river. Just before it flows into the Ottawa River, there is dam with a power generating station on the Noire River.

== Paddling the Noire River ==
The Noire River is not navigable until the confluence with Coughlin Creek, about 237 kilometers (147 mi) from its end. From here, the rapids that can be run are mostly Class 1 or 2 (based on medium water levels). A total of 27 kilometres (17 mi) are runnable whitewater. Notable rapids on the Noire are:

- km 114, "The Wall" - technical Class 2.
- km 100, "Targie" - Class 3 to 2.
- km 51, "50-50" - Class 3.
- km 40 to 30 - continuous Class 1 and swifts (except in low water)

One portage of note is the one around Mountain Chute. One has to take either a long route through arduous terrain or a shorter one that begins at the top of the falls and ends in a steep near-vertical descent requiring ropes.

== Hydroelectric station and dam ==
The river has been used for hydroelectric power generation since the beginning of the 20th century and is reputedly the first commercial station in Canada.

A high capacity gravity concrete dam was built in 1937 and modified in 1994. The dam is 11.7 metres (38 ft) high, 106.4 metres (349 ft) long, and has a capacity of 13,800 m^{3} (18,000 yd^{3}). The dam and W.R. Beatty Generating Station are near the mouth of the river at the outlet of Robinson Lake and generate 10.6 MW.

Originally owned by the Pembroke Electric Light Company and then the Pontiac Hydro Commission, it was acquired in 1996 by Brookfield Power.

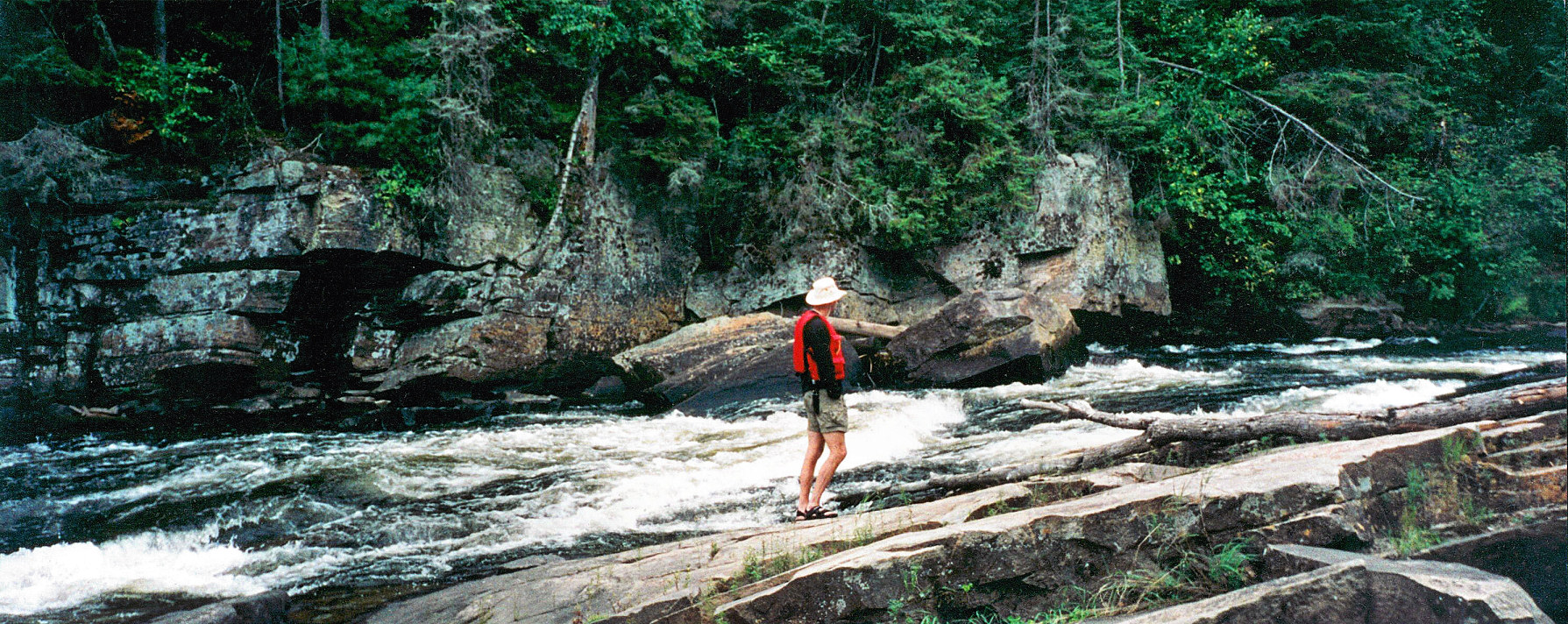
