= Cycloparc PPJ =

Rail trail in Quebec, Canada

Coordinates: 45°32′03″N 76°18′58″W

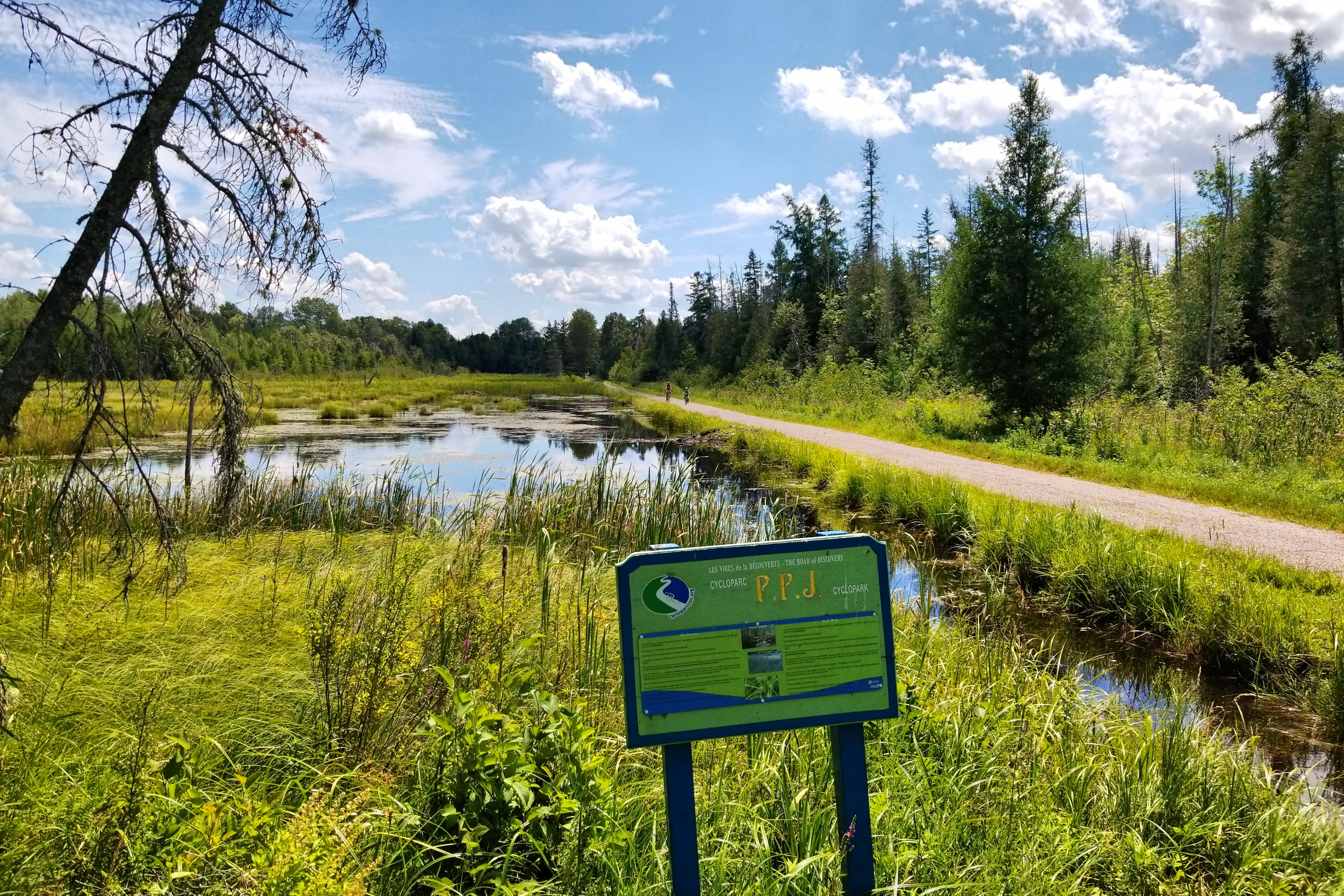
Cycloparc PPJ near Shawville

Cycloparc PPJ is a rail trail located in the Pontiac Regional County Municipality in Quebec, Canada.

The PPJ traverses 91.7 kilometres (57.0 mi) of hills and riverfront and enables hikers and cyclists to tour through points of interest such as Grand Calumet Island, the Vinton Plain and Coulonge Chutes near Fort-Coulonge. Slopes on the trail do not exceed 4%. The surface of the trail is made from a combination of stone and dust. No motor vehicles or hunting is permitted on the PPJ.

The trail is ideally suited for hikers and cyclists during the summer between May and October. There are numerous places to swim along the trail, including the Ottawa River and nearby off-trail Fort William. There are 14 rest areas along the route.

The trail originates at Kilometre 0 in Wyman and ends at Allumette Island (L'Îles-aux-Allumettes). Many rest areas, picnic spots and observation points are found along the length of the PPJ. The trail crosses the Félix-Gabriel-Marchand Bridge, the second longest operational covered bridge in Canada.

The trail is named after the Pontiac Pacific Junction Railway (PPJ) because it occupies the rail bed of this defunct railway company.

== Wildlife and nature ==
The trail is populated with numerous animals and those travelling along the route will find deer, bear, beaver and moose commonplace. Motor vehicles are not permitted anywhere along the trail, providing a serene setting to spot local wildlife. Different fruits available for picking along the PPJ include blueberries, wild apples and raspberries.

== Trail highlights ==
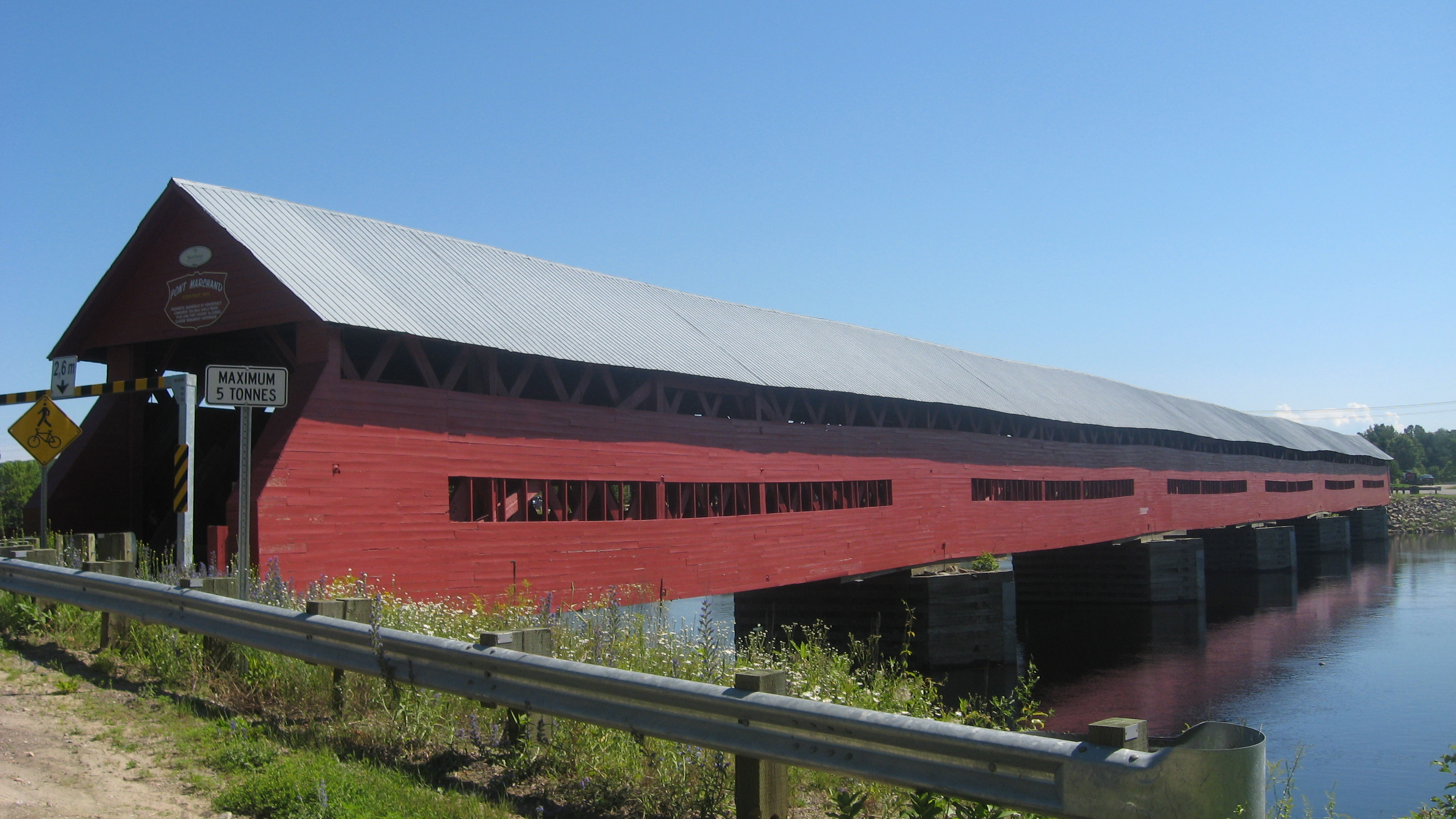
Félix-Gabriel-Marchand Bridge

- 17.26 kilometres (10.7 mi) of pastoral bicycle ride,
- 18 kilometres (11.2 mi) of wetlands and valleys sceneries,
- 17.7 kilometres (11.0 mi) of meadows and forests,
- 18 kilometres (11.2 mi) along the Ottawa River shores,
- 19.7 kilometres (12.2 mi) on Allumette Island

== History ==
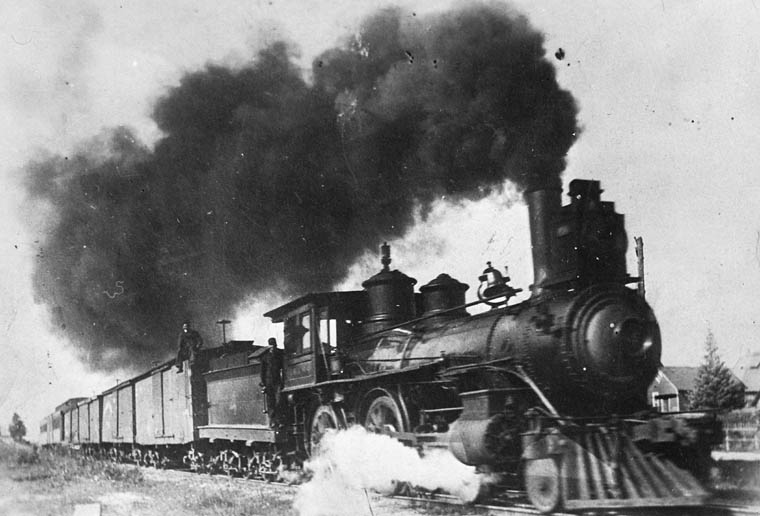
PPJR Engine No. 4 leaving Campbell's Bay, circa 1902.

The Pontiac Pacific Junction Railway Company (PPJR) is a historic Canadian railway that operated in the upper Ottawa River valley in western Quebec and northeastern Ontario, Canada.

The railway ran from Aylmer through Quyon, Shawville, Fort Coulonge, and Waltham to Pembroke, Ontario.

The PPJR was incorporated in 1880 and merged with the Ottawa Northern and Western Railway in 1903. It was the first Canadian railway to light cars using acetylene.

Its infamous nickname was Push, Pull and Jerk.

Taken over by Canadian Pacific in 1902, passenger service on the line was discontinued in 1959. Freight service followed suit in the 1980s, after which the rails were permanently dismantled in 1984 and later turned into a linear park or bicycle trail: the Cycloparc PPJ rail trail.

== See also ==
- Adventure travel
- Hiking
- Mountain biking
- Tourism in Canada
