= Bristol, Quebec =

Bristol
- Municipality
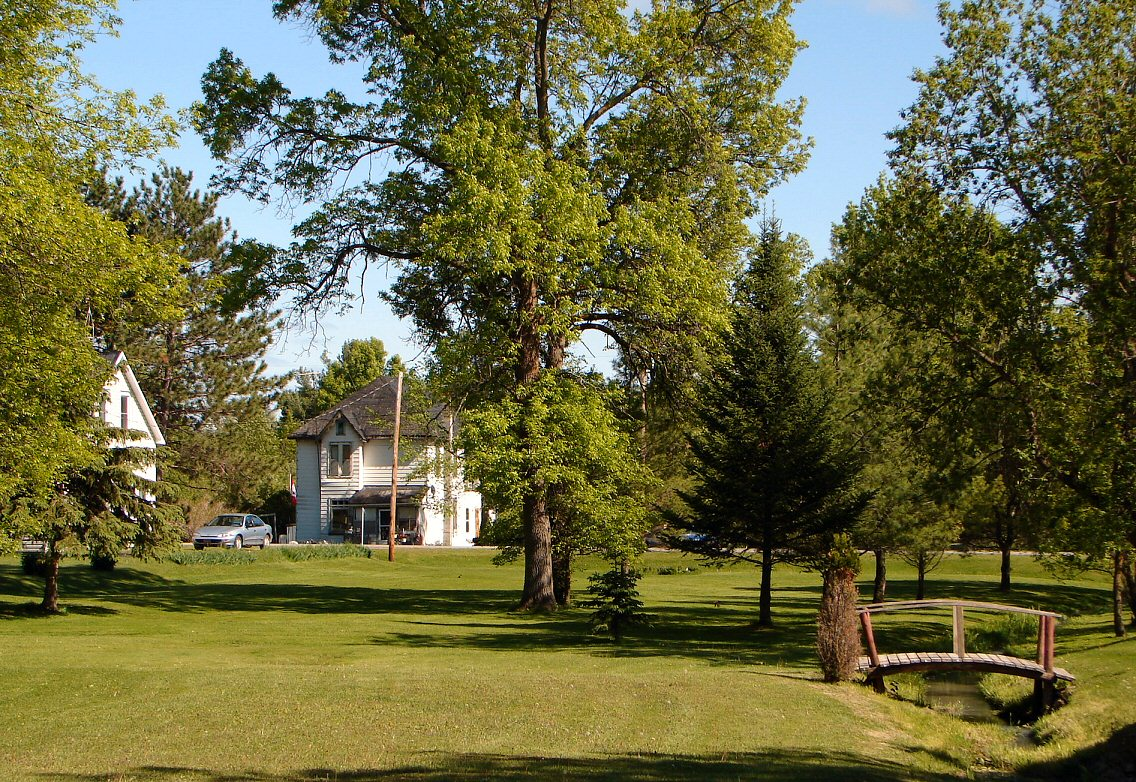

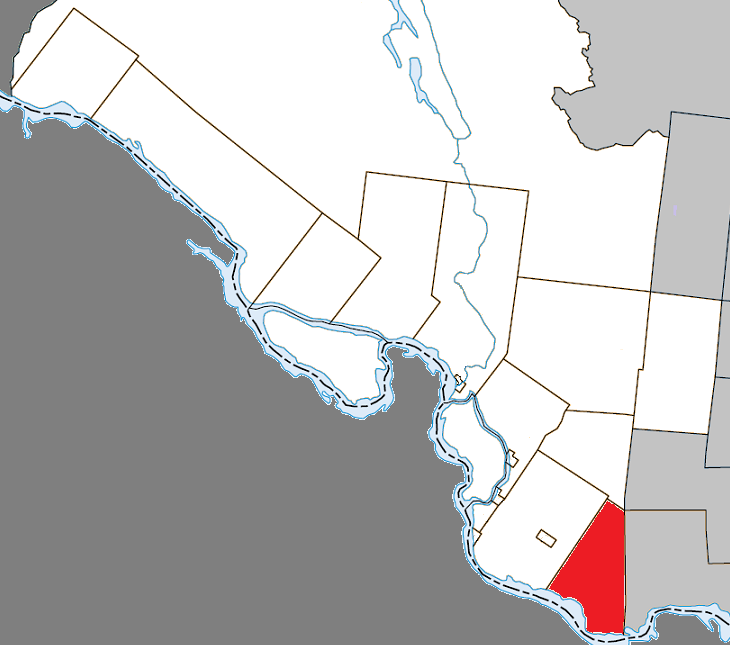
- Location within Pontiac RCM

- Location in western Quebec
- Coordinates: 45°32′N 76°28′W
- Country: Canada
- Province: Quebec
- Region: Outaouais
- RCM: Pontiac
- Constituted: July 1, 1855

Government
  - Mayor: Brent Orr
  - Federal riding: Pontiac—Kitigan Zibi
  - Prov. riding: Pontiac

Area
  - Total: 235.00 km^{2} (90.73 sq mi)
  - Land: 206.19 km^{2} (79.61 sq mi)

Population (2021)
  - Total: 1,199
  - Density: 5.8/km^{2} (15/sq mi)
  - Pop 2016-2021: ▲15.7%
  - Dwellings: 1,020
- Time zone: UTC−05:00 (EST)
  - Summer (DST): UTC−04:00 (EDT)
- Postal code(s): J0X 1G0
- Area code: 819
- Highways: R-148
- Website: bristolmunicipality.qc.ca

Bristol is a municipality in the Ottawa Valley, in the province of Quebec in the Outaouais region, part of the Pontiac Regional County Municipality, Quebec, Canada. It is located on the north shore of Lac des Chats (part of the Ottawa River) across from Arnprior, Ontario.

Its settlements include Bristol Village, Bristol Mines (Bristol-les-Mines), Bristol Ridge, Caldwell, Doherty, Elmside, Maple Ridge, Maryland, McKee, Norway Bay, and Weirstead.

== History ==
Bristol Township, already shown on the Gale and Duberger Map of 1795, was officially created in 1834. It was named after the City of Bristol in south-west England, known for its port facilities.

The first settlers came from England, Scotland, and Ireland, followed later on by settlers from Germany, France, and Poland. In 1845, a post office was established, and in 1855, the township municipality was created together with the neighbouring hamlet of Norway Bay, an area that is now a sought-after resort location on the Ottawa River. Its first mayor was William Craig and the mayor as of November 2009 is Brent Orr.

Canada's first horse-drawn railroad was in the Bristol area. It was operated by the Union Forwarding Company, and ran from Pontiac Village bypassing the Chats Falls, to Union Village until 1886.

From 1872 to 1894, iron ore was first mined. In 1956, a new open pit iron ore mine and processing facilities were built, employing up to 300 people. This was the first iron ore mining and pelletizing plant built in Quebec. It closed in 1976.

On April 24, 2004, the Township Municipality of Bristol was changed to Municipality of Bristol.

== Demographics ==
=== Population ===
Canada census – Bristol community profile

| | 2021 | 2016 | 2011 |
| Population | 1,199 (+15.7% from 2016) | 1,036 (-8.2% from 2011) | 1,128 (-6.8% from 2006) |
| Land area | 206.19 km^{2} (79.61 sq mi) | 207.19 km^{2} (80.00 sq mi) | 206.86 km^{2} (79.87 sq mi) |
| Population density | 5.8/km^{2} (15/sq mi) | 5.0/km^{2} (13/sq mi) | 5.5/km^{2} (14/sq mi) |
| Median age | 51.6 (M: 52.0, F: 51.2) | 50.0 (M: 49.0, F: 50.4) | 48.2 (M: 47.6, F: 48.7) |
| Private dwellings | 1,020 (total) 547 (occupied) | 1,013 (total) | 1,031 (total) |
| Median household income | $67,500 | $54,059 | $.N/A |

Notes: 2011 income data for this area has been suppressed for data quality or confidentiality reasons.
References: 2021 2016 2011

Historical Census Data - Bristol, Quebec
| Year | Pop. | ±% |
|---|---|---|
| 1986 | 1,095 | — |
| 1991 | 1,116 | +1.9% |
| 1996 | 1,129 | +1.2% |
| 2001 | 993 | −12.0% |
| 2006 | 1,210 | +21.9% |
| 2011 | 1,128 | −6.8% |
| 2016 | 1,036 | −8.2% |
| 2021 | 1,199 | +15.7% |

=== Language ===
Mother tongues:

- English as first language: 74.2%
- French as first language: 21.3%
- Other as first language: 1.7%

Due to the fact that many visitors come to Norway Bay in the summers, these statistics may change.

== Tourism and attractions ==
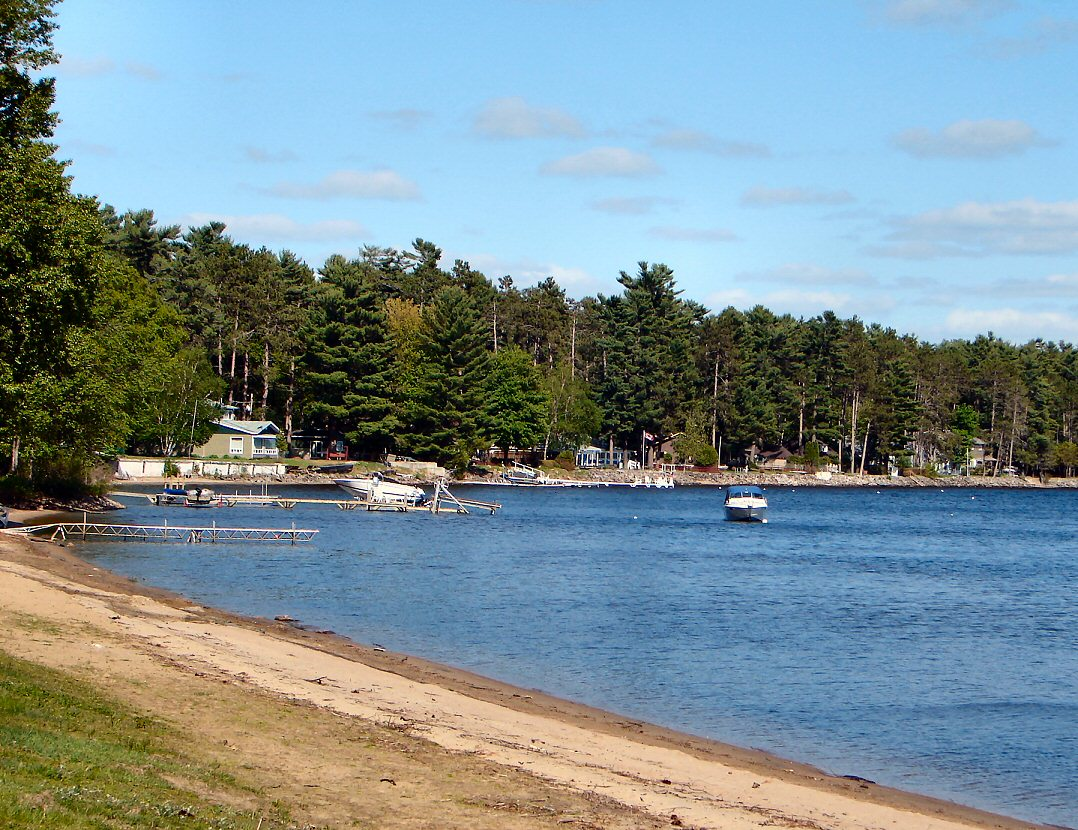
Public beach at Norway Bay

Norway Bay is a popular summer destination with hundreds of cottages and one hotel catering to tourists. Also located here is McLellan Park with a public beach and wharf on the Ottawa River.

During the months of June, July, and August, Norway Bay is considered home to hundreds of families. At the wharf, there are swimming lessons, and at the beach there are kayak and canoe adventures. Norway Bay has grown incredibly the past decade due to the many opportunities it brings to all ages.

Other outdoor activities include cycling on the Cycloparc PPJ trail, sampling agritourism and local food and drink products at Coronation Hall Cider Mills, golfing at Pine Lodge the local golf course, boating, fishing, and hiking.

In the winter, snowmobiling can be done on local trails, and on top of the frozen river, if temperatures permit.

== See also ==
- List of anglophone communities in Quebec
- List of municipalities in Quebec
