= Lac-Nilgaut =

- Unorganized territory
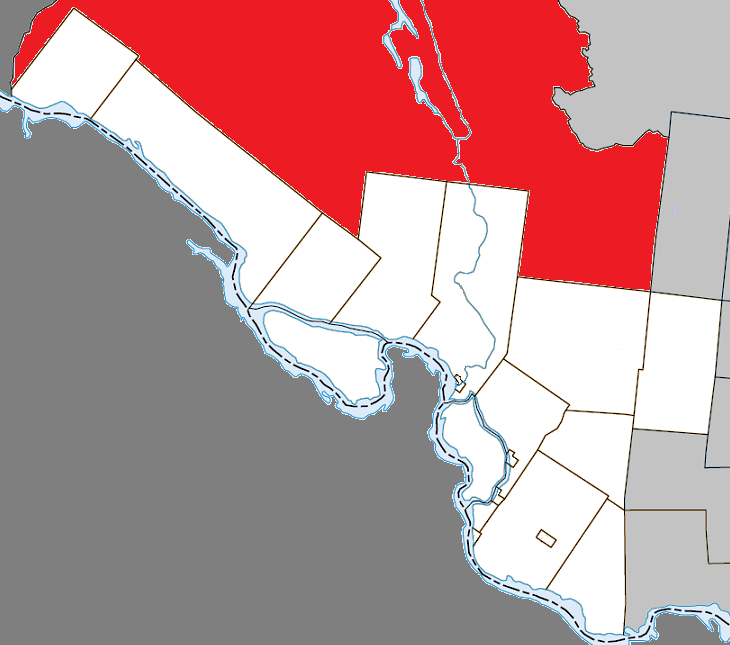
- Location within Pontiac RCM

- Location in western Quebec
- Coordinates: 46°36′N 77°15′W
- Country: Canada
- Province: Quebec
- Region: Outaouais
- RCM: Pontiac
- Constituted: January 1, 1986

Government
  - Fed. riding: Pontiac—Kitigan Zibi
  - Prov. riding: Pontiac

Area
  - Total: 9,875.70 km^{2} (3,813.03 sq mi)
  - Land: 8,966.53 km^{2} (3,462.00 sq mi)

Population (2021)
  - Total: 5
  - Density: 0/km^{2} (0/sq mi)
- Time zone: UTC−05:00 (EST)
  - Summer (DST): UTC−04:00 (EDT)
- Postal Code: J0X

Lac-Nilgaut is a large unorganized territory in the Outaouais region, Quebec, Canada. With a surface area of 9,851 km^{2} (3,803 sq mi), it makes up over 70% of the northern portion of Pontiac Regional County Municipality.

The eponymous Lake Nilgaut is located roughly in the centre of the territory, at an altitude of over 300 metres (980 ft). This 9 kilometres (5.6 mi) long lake is named after the nilgai (French: nilgaut), the largest Asian antelope and only found on the Indian subcontinent. The name was officially introduced in 1935, but it is unknown why this term was chosen to replace the original name Lac à l'Orignal (Moose Lake).

Lake Nilgaut drains via the Nilgaut creek into the Noire River, a major river that, together with the Coulonge River, bisects the territory.

== Demographics ==
Historical Census Data - Lac-Nilgaut, Quebec

Year	Pop.	±%
1981	0	—
1986	9	—
1991	1	−88.9%
1996	0	−100.0%
2001	10	—

Year	Pop.	±%
2006	20	+100.0%
2011	0	−100.0%
2016	5	—
2021	5	+0.0%

Source: Statistics Canada

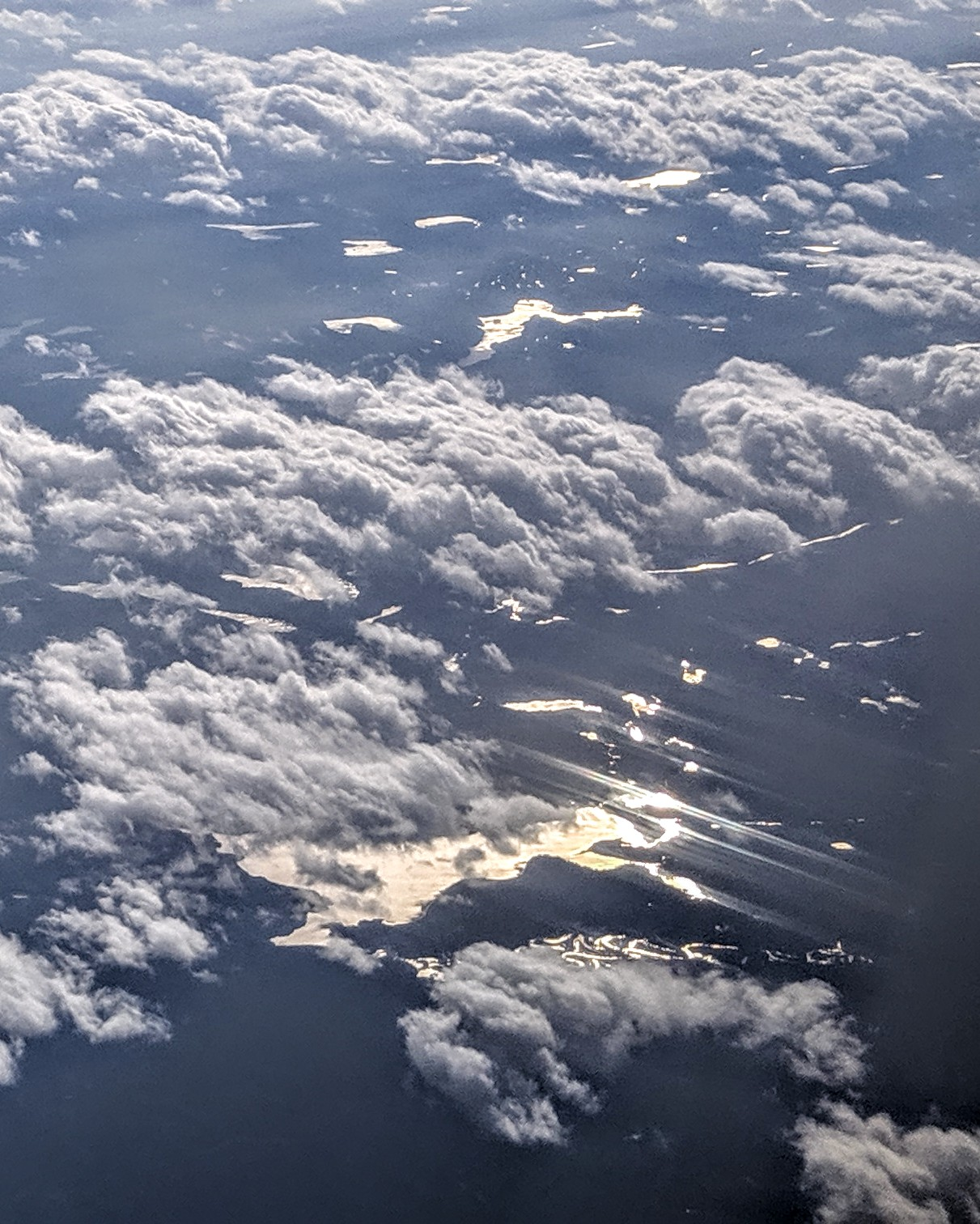
Aerial view from the northeast of Lac Usborne, Lac-Nilgaut, Quebec, with Lac à la Truite in the far background

== See also ==
- List of unorganized territories in Quebec
