= Quyon =

Village in Pontiac, Quebec, Canada

Coordinates: 45°31′N 76°14′W

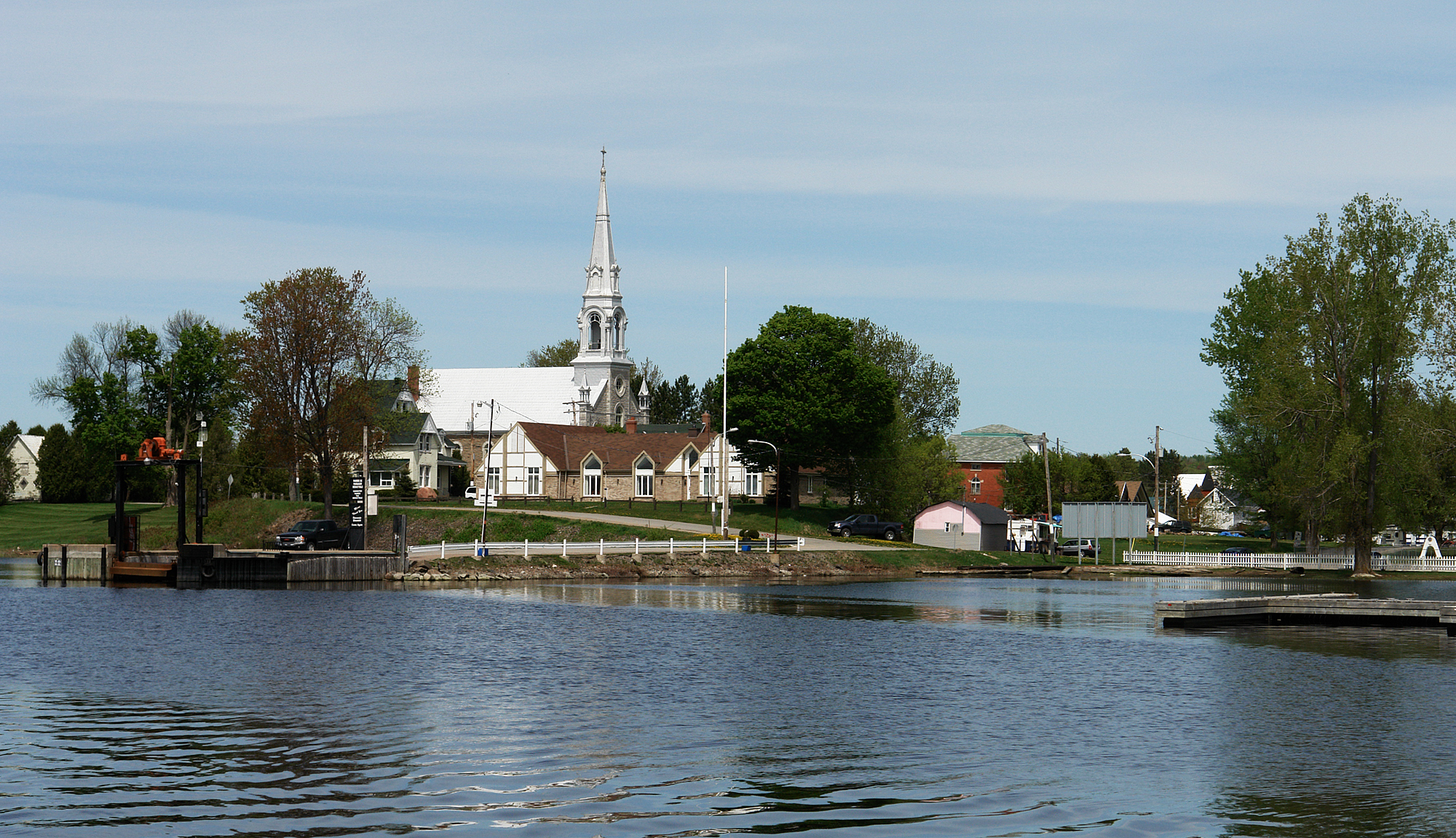
Quyon, Quebec, as seen from Ottawa river

Quyon is a village that is part of Pontiac, Quebec, in the Les Collines-de-l'Outaouais Regional County Municipality (MRC des Collines).

== History ==
Already the site of the Sainte-Marie Mission, the village was founded in 1848 by John Egan, a lumber baron of the Ottawa Valley and mayor of Aylmer from 1847 to 1855. It derived its name from the Quyon River, a tributary of the Ottawa River that was used by Egan for log driving, and was originally spelled "Quio", from the Native Algonquin word kweia (pronounced "quia"), meaning "Smaller River" or "sandy bottom river".

Some of the earliest English settlers were Scottish United Empire Loyalists, who were given free land in 1783 by the British Crown to thank them for their loyalty during the American Revolution. The area was heavily settled by Irish immigrants during the mid-19th century after the Great Famine forced many to emigrate for their survival. The town was incorporated on January 1, 1875, and its spelling was changed to "Quyon" to provide a compromise pronunciation equally acceptable to both French- and English-speaking residents. It experienced a period of prosperity because of the railway built by the Union Forwarding Company.

The village municipality of Quyon, along with the neighbouring townships of North Onslow, South Onslow, and Eardley, was amalgamated into the municipality of Pontiac in 1975.

== Transportation ==
Quyon is located a short distance south of Quebec Route 148. A ferry across the Ottawa River connects Quyon to rural northwestern Ottawa.

== See also ==
- List of former municipalities in Quebec
- Pontiac Pacific Junction Railway - former railway running through Quyon
