= Félix-Gabriel-Marchand Bridge =

Covered bridge in southern Quebec, Canada

Félix-Gabriel-Marchand Bridge Pont Félix-Gabriel-Marchand
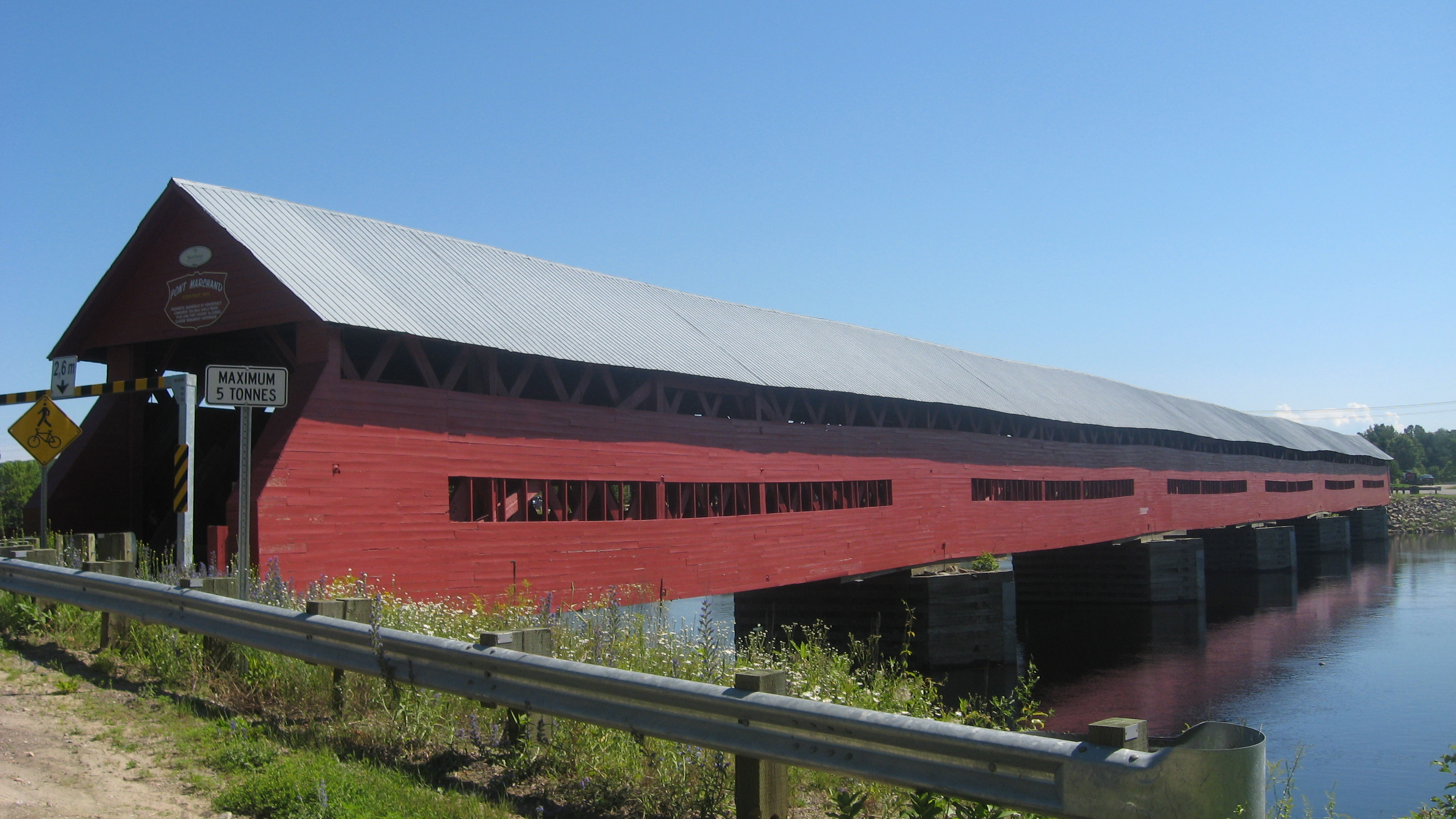
- Coordinates: 45°51′41″N 76°44′26″W
- Crosses: Coulonge River
- Locale: Near Fort-Coulonge
- Other name(s): Marchand Bridge, Red Bridge

Characteristics
- Design: Queen post and lattice trusses
- Total length: 148.66 m (487.7 ft)
- Width: 5.56 m (18.2 ft)
- Clearance above: 3.96 m (13.0 ft)

History
- Opened: 1898

Félix-Gabriel-Marchand Bridge is a covered bridge in the Township of Mansfield-et-Pontefract, Quebec, Canada, that crosses the Coulonge River near Fort-Coulonge.

Constructed in 1898, this 148.66-metre-long bridge is the longest covered bridge in Quebec. This bridge is unique in Quebec because of its combination of Town and Queenpost trusses.

It is registered as an historic building by the Quebec government.
