= Coulonge Chutes =

Waterfall in Outaouais, in Quebec, Canada

Chutes Coulonge
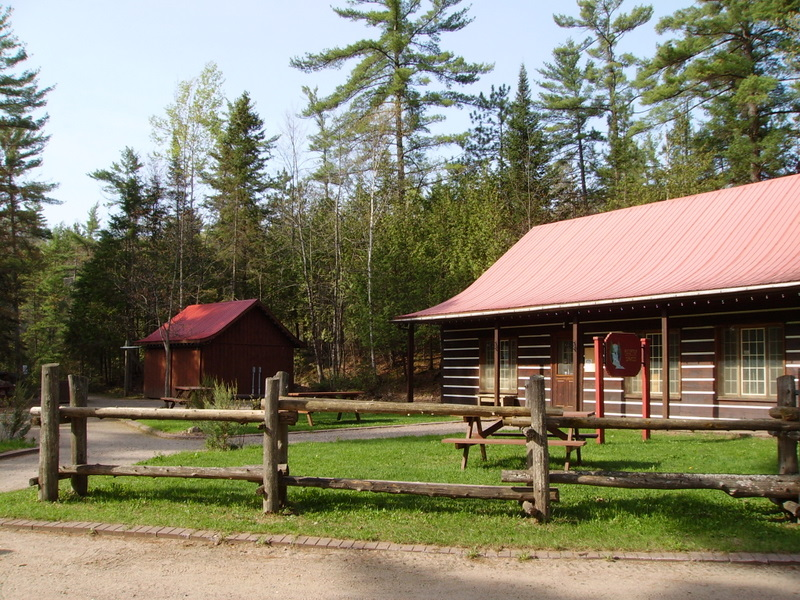
- Interactive map of Chutes Coulonge
- Location: Fort-Coulonge, Quebec
- Coordinates: 45°53′16.80″N 76°47′24.00″W

The Coulonge Chutes (in French: Chutes Coulonge) is a non-profit recreation park and historical exhibition area operating in Mansfield-et-Pontefract, in the Pontiac Regional County Municipality of western Quebec, Canada. Its main attraction is the 42 meters (138 ft) high Grandes Chutes waterfall of the Coulonge River and 100 meters (330 ft) long cement log slide.

Although the last log drive ended here in 1982, the waterfalls and gorge of the Coulonge River enjoy a substantial popularity among tourists, hikers and cyclists for playing a tremendous role in the reimagining of ecotourism in an area no longer able to survive upon resource extraction alone.

== History ==
At the beginning of the 19th century, early forestry operations pushed tall white pines, squared by axe, down into the Ottawa River, destined to be sold by auction near the Canadian Parliament buildings and exported to England where they were used to build ships during the Berlin Decree proclaimed by Napoleon Bonaparte. Timber from the area played a large part in the construction of cities along the American East Coast including Boston and New York City.

In the 1830s and 1840s, George Bryson Sr. settled near the mouth of the Coulonge River, an Ottawa River tributary - acquiring thousands of acres of timber rights including 200 acres (0.81 km^{2}) directly surrounding what is known as The Grandes Chutes, located approximately 15 kilometers north of the Ottawa River itself. In 1843, Bryson built the Marchand covered bridge.

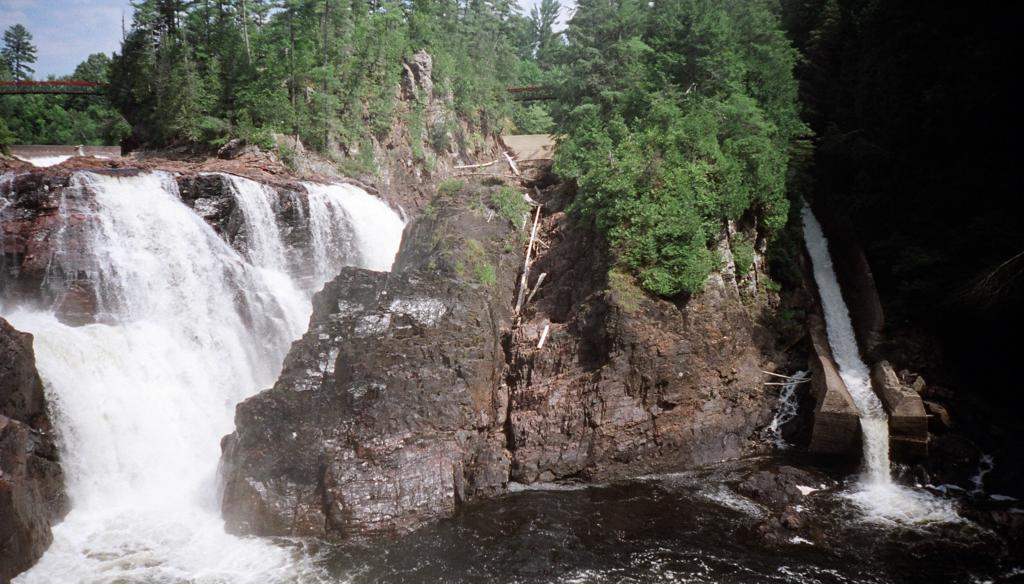
The Coulonge Chutes

As more settlers arrived in the area from Ireland, Scotland, the United States, Germany and Poland, many small towns along the length of the river were established.

Bryson constructed a sawmill on the river's edge around 1850. Because the Coulonge Falls were a huge obstacle in the transportation of local timber, a massive 3,000 feet (910 m) wooden log slide was constructed to enable wood to pass freely over the treacherous drop. In 1923, a cement slide replaced the wooden chute. J.E. Boyle, constructed a sawmill in Davidson - still in operation today - exporting to the United States and other Canadian provinces.

The Coulonge River and the log slide remained in use for log drives until 1982. The site became a public park in 1985 when a reception chalet was opened.

== See also ==
- Fort Coulonge
- Ottawa River
