= Mansfield-et-Pontefract =

- Municipality
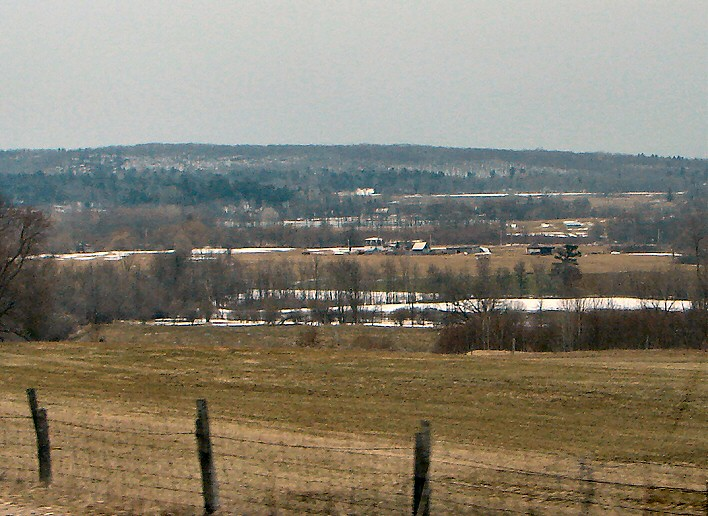

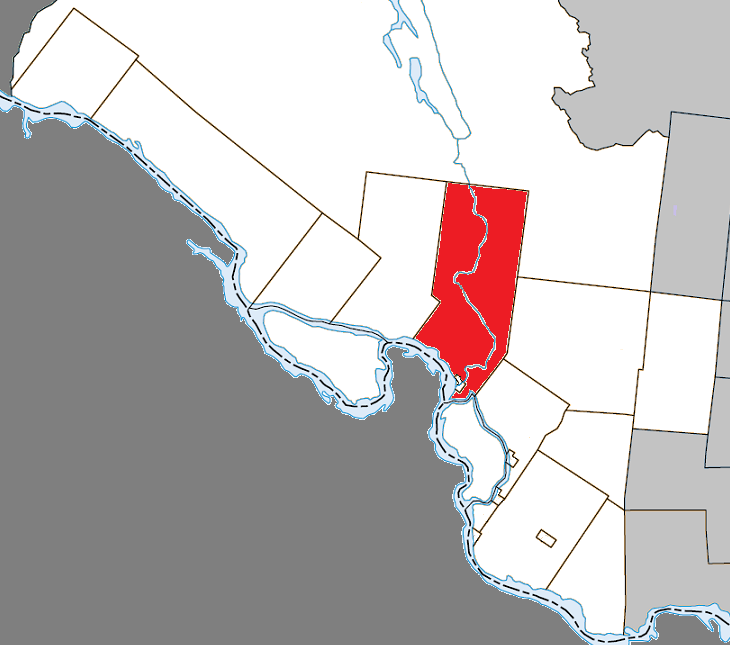
- Location within Pontiac RCM

- Location in western Quebec
- Coordinates: 45°51′40″N 76°44′21″W
- Country: Canada
- Province: Quebec
- Region: Outaouais
- RCM: Pontiac
- Constituted: January 1, 1868

Government
  - Mayor: Sandra Armstrong
  - Federal riding: Pontiac—Kitigan Zibi
  - Prov. riding: Pontiac

Area
  - Total: 523.45 km^{2} (202.11 sq mi)
  - Land: 466.61 km^{2} (180.16 sq mi)

Population (2021)
  - Total: 2,250
  - Density: 4.8/km^{2} (12/sq mi)
  - Pop (2016-21): ▼1.5%
  - Dwellings: 1,074
- Time zone: UTC−5 (EST)
  - Summer (DST): UTC−4 (EDT)
- Postal code(s): J0X 1R0
- Area code: 819
- Highways: R-148
- Website: www.mansfield-pontefract.com

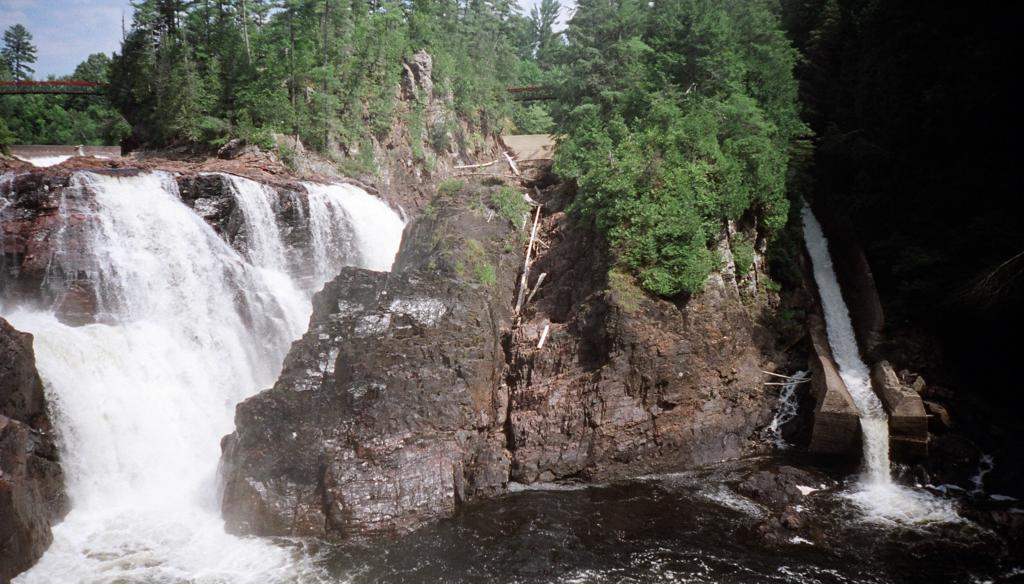
The chutes on the Coulonge River.

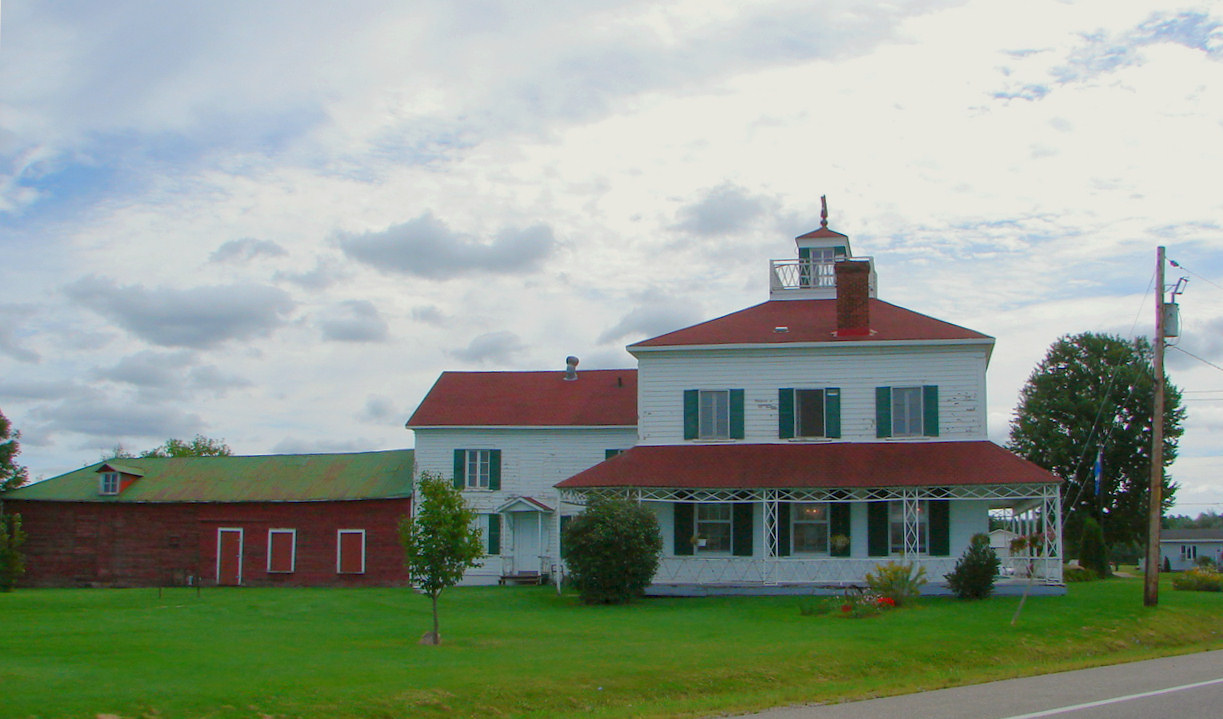
The Bryson House, built in the 19th century and a Quebec historical site since 1980.

Mansfield-et-Pontefract is a municipality in the Pontiac Regional County Municipality of western Quebec, Canada. It is located on the Ottawa River, northwest of Gatineau. It is the most populated municipality in the Pontiac Regional County Municipality, with most of the population and businesses concentrated along Quebec Route 148.

It is home to the main tourist attractions of the Pontiac region: the Chutes Coulonge, the George Bryson House, and the Félix-Gabriel-Marchand Bridge.

== Communities ==
- Davidson
- Dépôt Davidson
- Devonshire Park
- Jim Lake
- Leclair
- Mansfield

== History ==
In 1849, the Mansfield Township was formed that was incorporated as a township municipality in 1855. It may have been named after the English town of Mansfield in Nottinghamshire or in honour of Sir James Mansfield (1733-1821), Solicitor General of Canada in 1780, or William Murray, 1st Earl of Mansfield (1705–1793). In 1863, Pontefract Township was officially established, named after an English town in Yorkshire.

On January 1, 1868, the townships were merged to form the United Township Municipality of Mansfield-et-Pontefract. In 1888, a portion of its territory separated and was incorporated as the Village Municipality of Fort-Coulonge. In 2003, Mansfield-et-Pontefract changed its status from united township municipality to an ordinary municipality.

== Demographics ==
=== Population ===
Canada census – Mansfield-et-Pontefract community profile

	2021	2016	2011
Population	2,250 (-1.5% from 2016)	2,285 (3.7% from 2011)	2,204 (+6.2% from 2006)
Land area	466.61 km^{2} (180.16 sq mi)	477.44 km^{2} (184.34 sq mi)	474.80 km^{2} (183.32 sq mi)
Population density	4.8/km^{2} (12/sq mi)	4.8/km^{2} (12/sq mi)	4.6/km^{2} (12/sq mi)
Median age	49.2 (M: 49.2, F: 49.2)	47.1 (M: 47.1, F: 47.0)	44.3 (M: 44.5, F: 44.2)
Private dwellings	1,074 (total) 883 (occupied)	1,113 (total)	1,030 (total)
Median household income	$76,500	$61,664	$.N/A

Notes: 2011 income data for this area has been suppressed for data quality or confidentiality reasons.
References: 2021 2016 2011

Historical Census Data - Mansfield-et-Pontefract, Quebec

Year	Pop.	±%
1976	2,004	—
1981	2,021	+0.8%
1986	1,958	−3.1%
1991	1,902	−2.9%
1996	2,115	+11.2%

Year	Pop.	±%
2001	2,077	−1.8%
2006	2,075	−0.1%
2011	2,204	+6.2%
2016	2,285	+3.7%
2021	2,250	−1.5%

2006 data based on adjustment following Census publication.
Source: Statistics Canada

=== Language ===
Mother tongue (2021):

- English as first language: 17.8%
- French as first language: 77.6%
- English and French as first language: 4.1%
- Other as first language: 0.5%

== See also ==
- List of anglophone communities in Quebec
- List of municipalities in Quebec
