= Coulonge River =

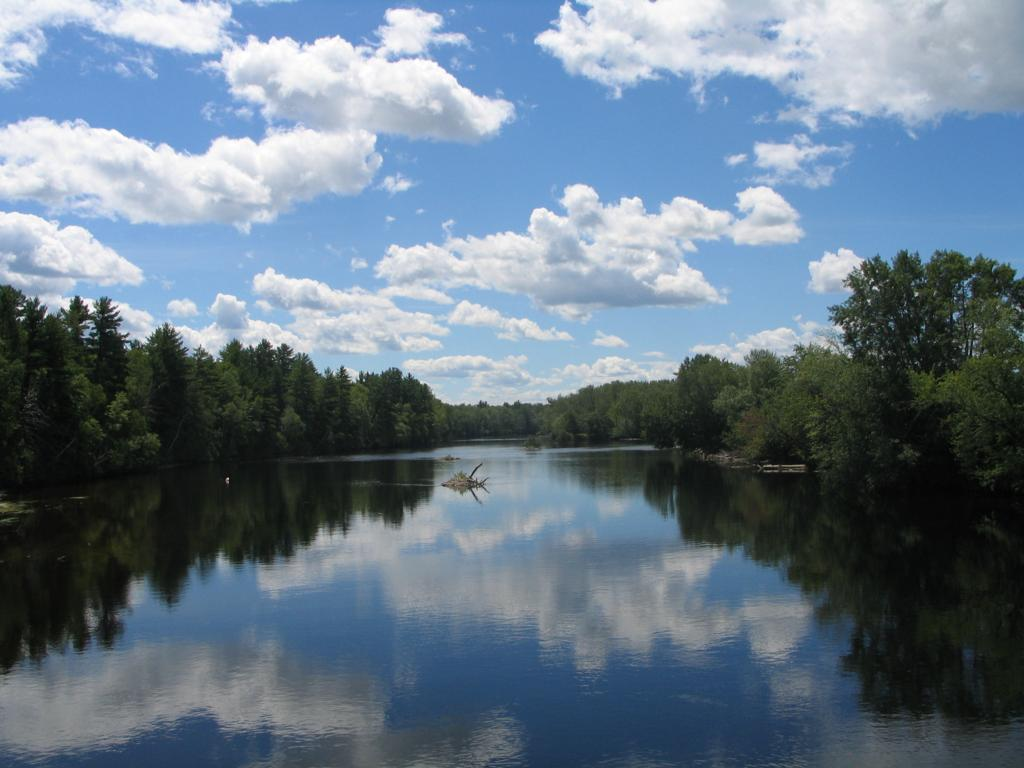
- Coulonge River near Pont Davidson

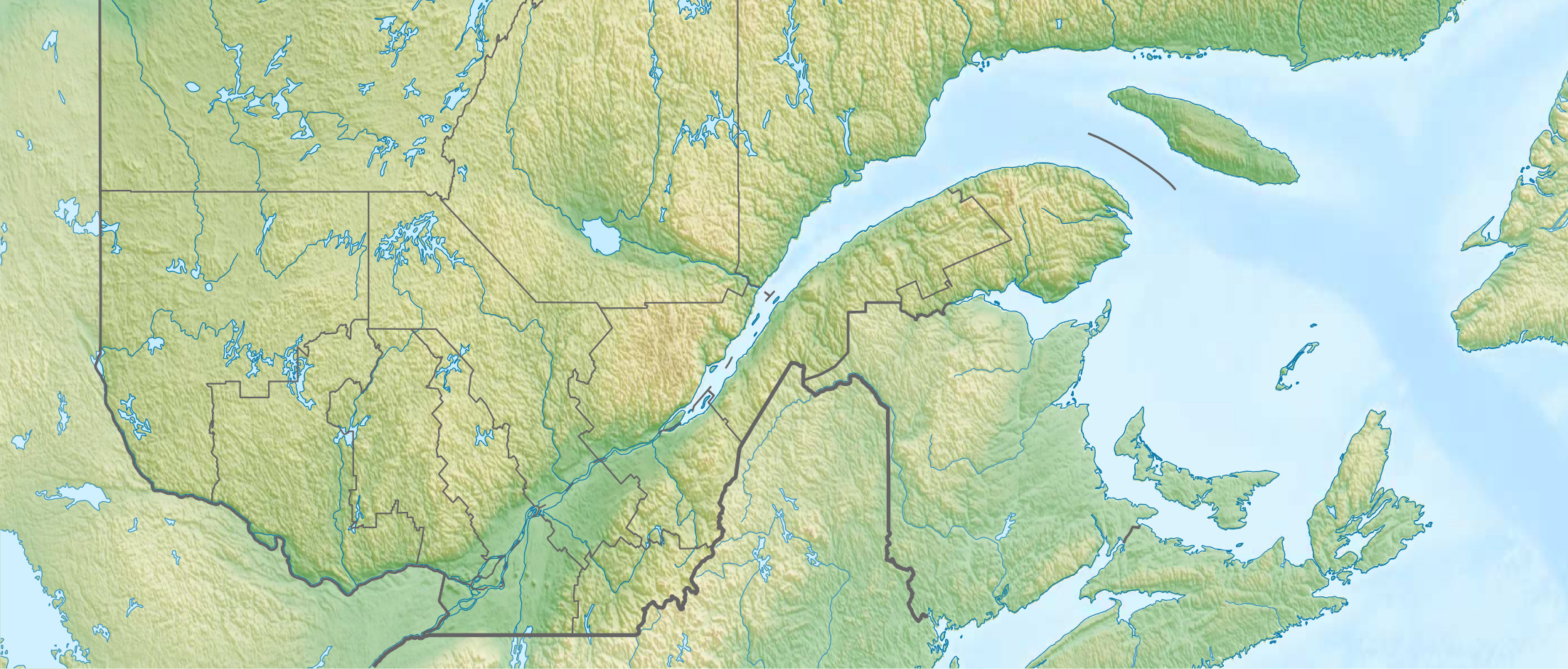
- Location within Quebec South
- Native name: Rivière Coulonge (French)

Location
- Country: Canada
- State: Quebec
- Region: Outaouais

Physical characteristics
- Source: Lac au Barrage
  - location: Lac-Pythonga, Quebec
  - coordinates: 47°12′30″N 76°53′30″W
  - elevation: 359 m (1,178 ft)
- Mouth: Ottawa River
  - location: Fort-Coulonge, Quebec
  - coordinates: 45°51′44″N 76°45′54″W
  - elevation: 105 m (344 ft)
- Length: 240 km (150 mi)
- Basin size: 5,060 km^{2} (1,950 sq mi)
- Discharge
  - average: 74.1 m^{3}/s (2,620 cu ft/s)
  - minimum: 25.1 m^{3}/s (890 cu ft/s)
  - maximum: 195 m^{3}/s (6,900 cu ft/s)

Basin features
- Progression: Ottawa River→ St. Lawrence River→ Gulf of St. Lawrence
- River system: Ottawa River drainage basin
- Tributaries
  - left: East Coulonge River

The Coulonge River (English: /kuːˈlɒndʒ/; French: [kulɔ̃ʒ]) is a predominantly wilderness river in western Quebec, Canada.

A popular river for whitewater canoeing enthusiasts, it is often grouped together with the Dumoine and Noire Rivers as three of a kind. The three rivers share the same watershed, and have similar whitewater characteristics. All three empty into the Ottawa River within a distance of 105 kilometers (65 mi) from one another.

== Description ==
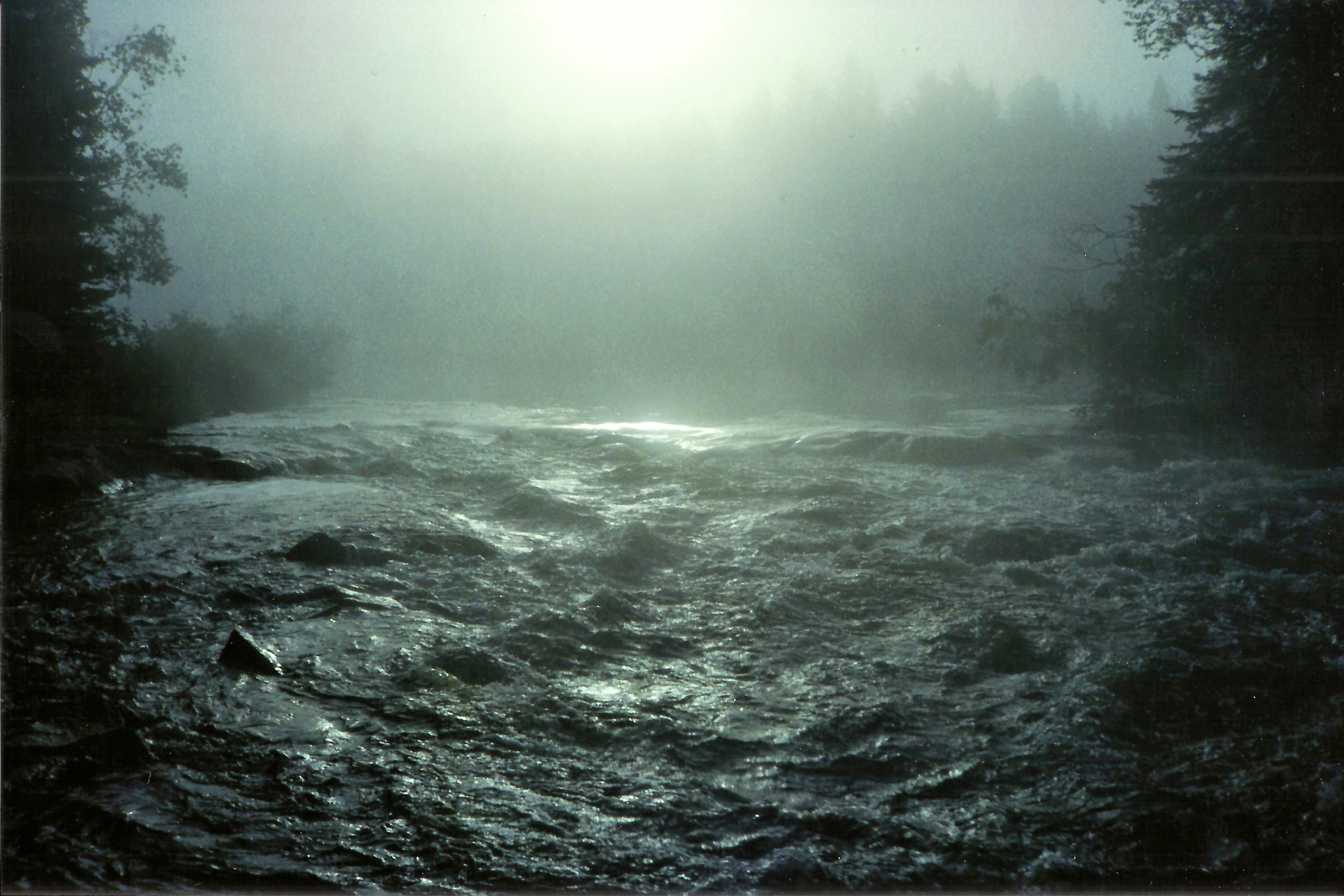
Upper Coulonge River in La Vérendrye Park

One of a dozen or so significant tributaries of the Ottawa River, the Coulonge River has a length of 240 kilometres (150 mi) and a drainage area of 5,060 square kilometres (1,950 sq mi), and runs in a general south-eastern direction from its headwaters in Lac au Barrage (situated in La Vérendrye Wildlife Reserve) to the Ottawa River at Fort-Coulonge. Over that distance, it drops approximately 260 meters (850 ft). The massive Grandes or Coulonge Chutes, with a height of 48 meters (157 ft), is approximately 15 kilometers (9.3 mi) upstream of the confluence with the Ottawa River.

The historic Félix-Gabriel-Marchand Bridge crosses the Coulonge River near Fort-Coulonge. Constructed in 1898, this 148.66 metres (487.7 ft) long bridge is the longest covered bridge in Quebec.

Over the period 1926 to 1993, the Coulonge River had a mean flow of 74.1 cubic metres per second (2,620 cu ft/s). Mean minimal flow was 25.1 cubic metres per second (890 cu ft/s) and mean maximum flow was 195 cubic metres per second (6,900 cu ft/s). Record maximum flow was 410 cubic metres per second (14,000 cu ft/s) in May 1947, while record minimum flow was 9.58 cubic metres per second (338 cu ft/s) in October 1948.

== History ==
The Coulonge River is named after Nicholas d'Ailleboust de Manthet (1663–1709), Sieur de Coulonge, a French explorer who spent the winter of 1694–95 at the nearby Allumettes Island.

The Coulonge was used as a waterway by native North Americans and, later, by the coureurs des bois plying their independent trade in furs. In 1784, the North West Company built a fort at the mouth of the river, named Fort Coulonge, which passed into the hands of the Hudson's Bay Company when the two companies merged in 1821.

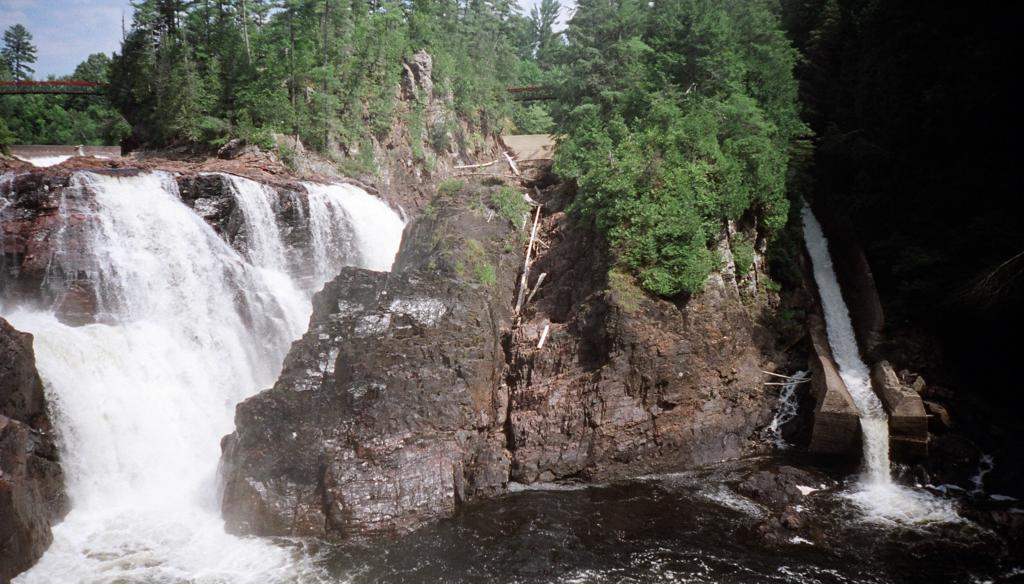
The Grandes Chutes

In 1835, Scottish-born lumber baron George Bryson acquired timber rights to thousands of acres of forest in the area, including the 200 acres (81 ha) immediately surrounding the Grandes Chutes. In 1843, Bryson built a sawmill near the mouth of the river, which led to permanent settlement and the formation of the village of Fort-Coulonge. To transport the squared timber safely past the falls and the 750 m (2,460 ft) gorge below, Bryson built a 915 m (3,002 ft)-long timber slide (a wooden chute flowing with water diverted from the head of the falls), which was replaced by a concrete chute in 1923.

For almost 150 years, the forests around the Coulonge were logged throughout the winter months until spring breakup permitted the massive log drives which, along with similar operations throughout the Ottawa River watershed, fueled the economy of the Ottawa Valley region from the early 19th century through the middle of the 20th.

The last spring log drive in Canada took place on the Coulonge River in 1982. Since then, the timber from smaller-scale logging operations has been hauled out by trucks over a network of dirt roads which meander throughout the Coulonge River valley.

In 1994, a hydro-electric dam and power station was built at the head of the Grandes Chutes, leaving the Dumoine River as the last major free-flowing tributary of the Ottawa River.

In August 2020, 2 persons drowned in the Coulonge River in separate incidents: the body of a woman was found just north of Fort Coulonge; and a man was swept away by strong rapids while swimming about 40 kilometres (25 mi) upstream.
