= Pontiac, Quebec =

Pontiac
- Municipality
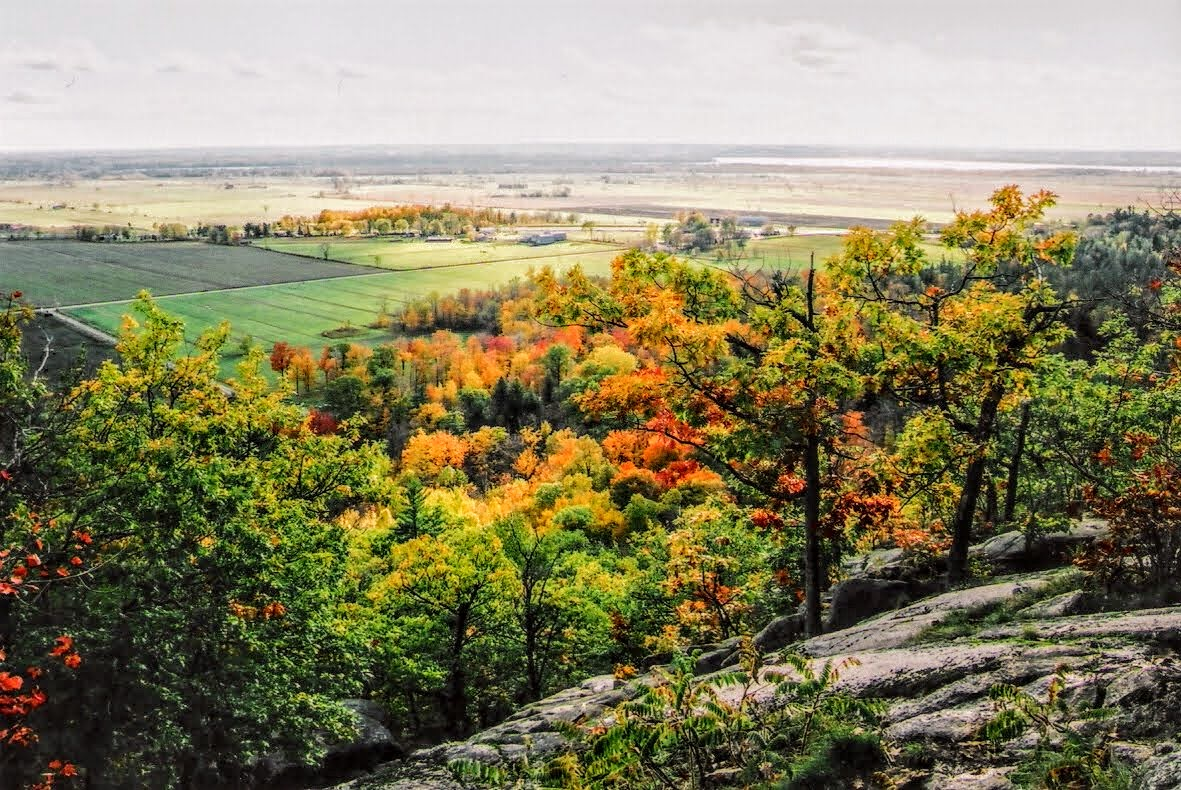
- Pontiac as seen from the Gatineau Hills

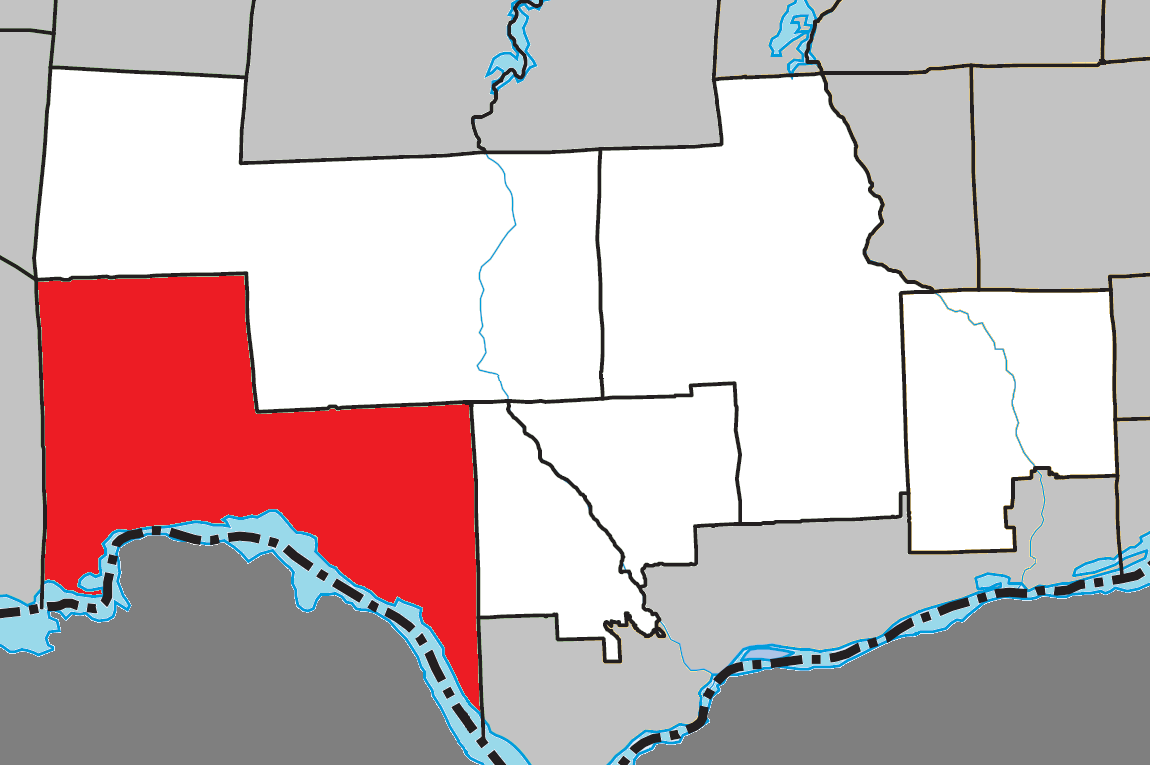
- Location within Les Collines-de-l'Outaouais RCM

- Location in western Quebec
- Coordinates: 45°35′N 76°08′W
- Country: Canada
- Province: Quebec
- Region: Outaouais
- RCM: Les Collines-de-l'Outaouais
- Constituted: January 1, 1975

Government
  - Mayor: Roger Larose
  - Federal riding: Pontiac—Kitigan Zibi
  - Prov. riding: Pontiac

Area
  - Total: 504.60 km^{2} (194.83 sq mi)
  - Land: 445.27 km^{2} (171.92 sq mi)

Population (2021)
  - Total: 6,142
  - Density: 13.8/km^{2} (36/sq mi)
  - Pop 2016-2021: ▲5%
  - Dwellings: 2,710
- Time zone: UTC−05:00 (EST)
  - Summer (DST): UTC−04:00 (EDT)
- Postal code(s): J0X 2G0, J0X 2V0
- Area Code: 819
- Highways: R-148
- Website: www.municipalitepontiac.com

Pontiac (French pronunciation: [pɔ̃tjak]) is a municipality in the Outaouais Region of western Quebec, Canada, on the north shore of the Ottawa River. It is part of Les Collines-de-l'Outaouais Regional County Municipality, included in the National Capital Region. It should not be confused with Pontiac Regional County Municipality, which is also in the Outaouais but not included in the National Capital Region.

It was created by the 1975 amalgamation of the municipalities of North Onslow, South Onslow, Quyon and Eardley, and named after the Odawa war chief Pontiac.

Pontiac has a low cost of living and is trying to attract new immigrants coming to Canada to improve the local economy. A large portion of Gatineau Park is within this municipality.

== Communities ==
- Beech Grove
- Breckenridge
- Eardley
- Heyworth
- Lusk
- Luskville
- Mohr
- North Onslow
- Onslow Corners
- Pontiac village
- Quyon
- Ruthledge
- Steel
- Wyman

== History ==
The first European settlers in this area were Joseph Mondion and his family, who built a homestead in 1786 on what is known today as Indian Point. In 1800 his property was taken over by the XY Company, followed by the North West Company in 1804, and then the Hudson's Bay Company in 1821, when these two companies merged. The HBC operated a small trading post, which closed in 1837.

Onslow and Eardley Townships were already plotted on the Gale and Duberger Map of 1795, and it was early in the 19th century that these townships were opened to logging and settlement. One of the first settlements was on Pontiac Bay, founded by Philemon Wright and named at times Wright shanties, Pontiac Village, and Pontiacville. Quyon was founded in 1848 when a sawmill was built by John Egan at the mouth of the Quyon River.

The Township Municipality of Onslow (likely named after George Onslow, 1st Earl of Onslow) was formed in 1855, with John Behan as first mayor. In January 1875, Quyon village separated from Onslow to form its own municipality, and the following year, the township split into Onslow South (Onslow-Partie-Sud) and Onslow, renamed to Onslow North (Onslow-Partie-Nord) in 1878.

== Demographics ==
Canada census – Pontiac community profile

	2021	2016	2011
Population	6,142 (+5.0% from 2016)	5,850 (3.0% from 2011)	5,681 (8.5% from 2006)
Land area	445.27 km^{2} (171.92 sq mi)	448.15 km^{2} (173.03 sq mi)	448.31 km^{2} (173.09 sq mi)
Population density	13.8/km^{2} (36/sq mi)	13.1/km^{2} (34/sq mi)	12.7/km^{2} (33/sq mi)
Median age	41.6 (M: 42, F: 40.8)	41.9 (M: 42.4, F: 41.2)	41.1 (M: 41.5, F: 40.8)
Private dwellings	2,375 (total)	2,664 (total)	2,659 (total)
Median household income		$77,952	$75,527

References: 2021 2016 2011

Pontiac, Quebec – Historical census populations
Year	Pop.	±%
1986	3,955	—
1991	4,501	+13.8%
1996	4,722	+4.9%
2001	4,643	−1.7%
2006	5,238	+12.8%
2011	5,681	+8.5%
2016	5,850	+3.0%
2021	6,142	+5.0%

According to the 2016 Canadian Census, the population's mother tongue was 55.5% French, 38.6% English, and 3.2% other languages, including Portuguese, German, Arabic, Spanish, Dutch, and Russian. Approximately 64.3% of people are bilingual, speaking both French and English.

== Local government ==
List of former mayors:

- William Burke (1975–1979)
- Marcel Lavigne (1979–1990)
- Edward McCann (1990–1994)
- Marcel Lavigne (1994–1998)
- Bruce R. Campbell (1998–2005)
- Edward McCann (2005–2013)
- Roger Larose (2013–2017)
- Joanne Labadie (2017–2021)
- Roger Larose (2021–present)

== See also ==
- List of anglophone communities in Quebec
- List of municipalities in Quebec
- Pontiac Airpark
- Pontiac Airpark Water Aerodrome
