= Fort-Coulonge =

- Village municipality
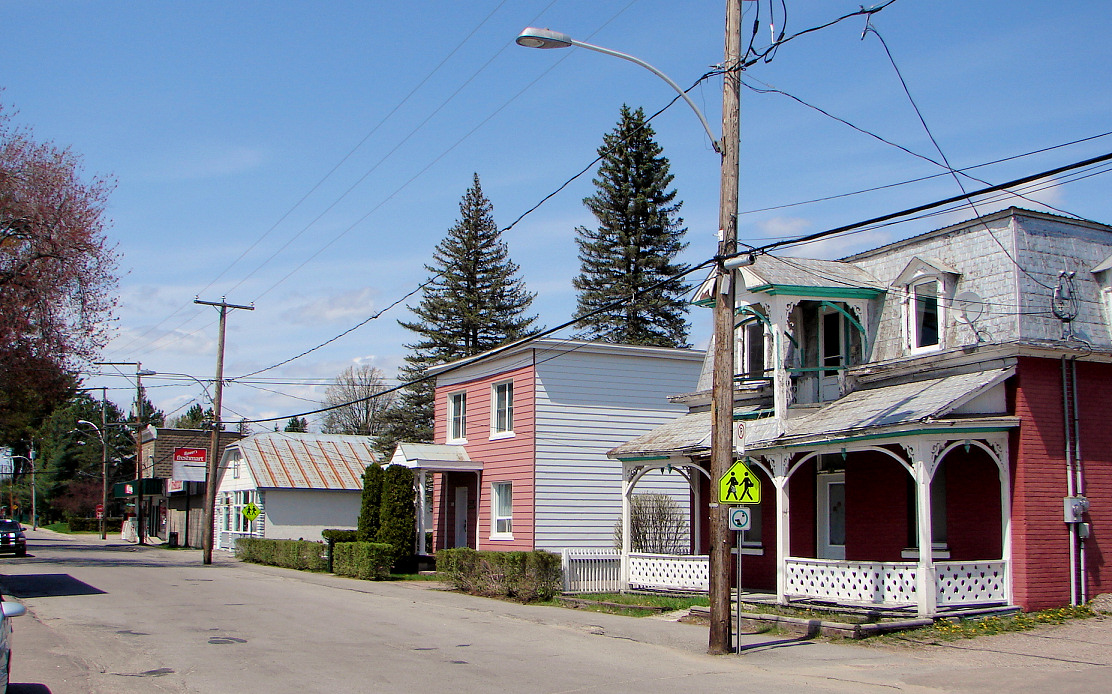
- Rue Principale in Fort-Coulonge

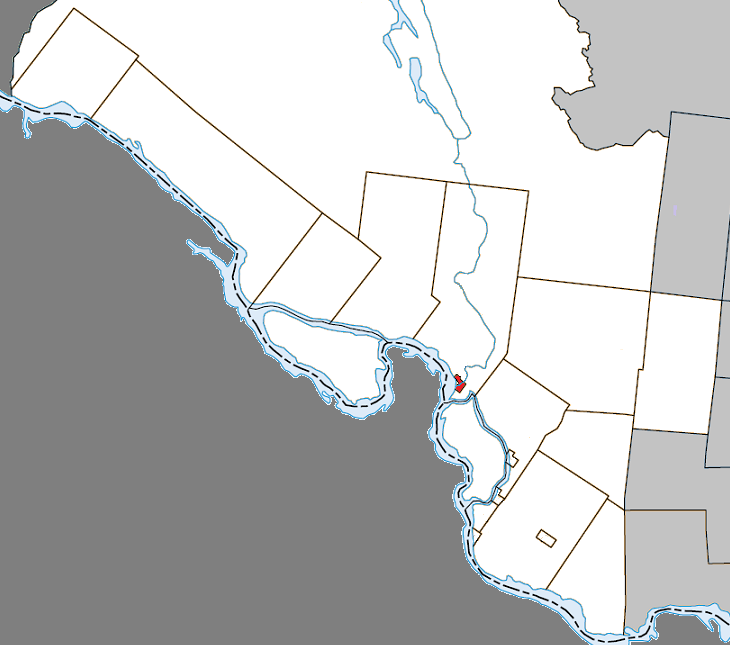
- Location within Pontiac RCM

- Location in western Quebec
- Coordinates: 45°51′N 76°44′W
- Country: Canada
- Province: Quebec
- Region: Outaouais
- RCM: Pontiac
- Constituted: December 15, 1888

Government
  - Mayor: Christine Francoeur
  - Federal riding: Pontiac—Kitigan Zibi
  - Prov. riding: Pontiac

Area
  - Total: 3.17 km^{2} (1.22 sq mi)
  - Land: 2.96 km^{2} (1.14 sq mi)

Population (2021)
  - Total: 1,312
  - Density: 443.9/km^{2} (1,150/sq mi)
  - Pop (2016-21): ▼8.4%
  - Dwellings: 605
- Time zone: UTC−05:00 (EST)
  - Summer (DST): UTC−04:00 (EDT)
- Postal code(s): J0X 1V0
- Area code: 819
- Website: fortcoulonge.qc.ca

Fort Coulonge (French pronunciation: [fɔʁ kulɔ̃ʒ]) is a village in the Pontiac Regional County Municipality in western Quebec, Canada, at the mouth of the Coulonge River. It is the francophone centre of the otherwise largely (57%) anglophone Pontiac MRC, with 79.6% listing French as their mother tongue in the Canada 2006 Census.

Fort-Coulonge is known for the Félix-Gabriel-Marchand Bridge, Quebec's longest covered bridge which is actually in neighbouring Mansfield-et-Pontefract.

== History ==
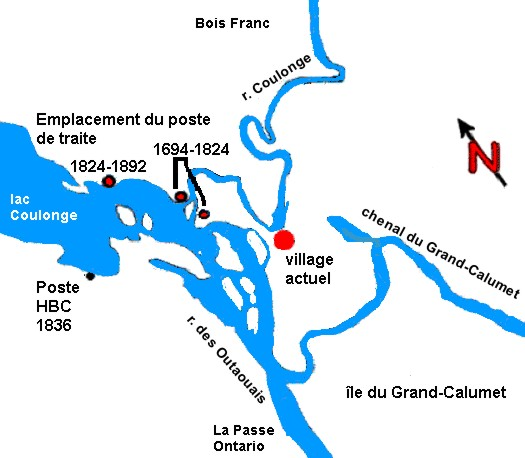
Historic locations of Fort Coulonge.

In the late 17th century the site was occupied, perhaps intermittently, by members of the d'Ailleboust family, who used "sieur de Coulonge" as a title. Accounts differ: the Commission de toponymie du Québec mentions Nicholas d'Ailleboust de Manthet, who wintered in that location in 1694; Elizabeth Browne Losey says it was founded by the d'Ailleboust family 'as early as 1650'. With the fall of New France it was abandoned.

In 1784, the site was re-occupied when the North West Company built a fort, named Fort Coulonge. When the Hudson's Bay Company took over in 1821 it continued to be supplied from Montreal. Until 1828 it was the head trading post on the Ottawa River. The post engaged in farming, as well as trading with the indigenous Ojibwe and Algonquins. After 1830, as the area became more settled, it became more like a general store. The post's 655-acre (2.65 km^{2}) farm was sold in 1844. In 1855 the surviving store was sold to Thomas Taylor, its last clerk. The buildings were still standing in 1873 but by 1892 they had burned down.

The trading post became the village of Fort-Coulonge situated several kilometres down river, when in 1843, the region's first sawmill was built by George Bryson Sr. This was the impetus that led to permanent settlement and the formation of the village. Two year later in 1845, the mission of Saint-Pierre-de-Fort-Coulonge was established, followed by the Presbyterian parish of St. Andrews in 1863. Its post office opened in 1853. By the mid 1860s, the town had a population of about 500.

The first wooden chapel was built in 1873. It was destroyed by fire and replaced by a brick church in 1884. In 1886, the Pontiac Pacific Junction Railway reached Fort-Coulonge. Fort-Coulonge became a municipality in 1888 when it separated from the Township Municipality of Mansfield. John Bryson, son of George Bryson, was the first mayor.

The lumber industry continued to drive the growth of Fort-Coulonge in the 1890s and early 20th century. The many logging camps in the Ottawa Valley created a big demand for accommodation in the town; by the 1890s there were at least 5 hotels. The town's mills produced thousands of feet of cut lumber, as well as pulp wood.

In passenger rail service to Fort-Coulonge ended in 1958, and cargo traffic ended in 1977.

== Demographics ==
In the 2021 Census of Population conducted by Statistics Canada, Fort-Coulonge had a population of 1,312 living in 574 of its 605 total private dwellings, a change of −8.4% from its 2016 population of 1,433. With a land area of 2.96 km^{2} (1.14 sq mi), it had a population density of 443.2/km^{2} (1,148.0/sq mi) in 2021.

Canada census – Fort-Coulonge community profile

	2021	2016	2011
Population	1,312 (-8.4% from 2016)	1,433 (4.1% from 2011)	1,377 (+1.4% from 2006)
Land area	2.96 km^{2} (1.14 sq mi)	3.10 km^{2} (1.20 sq mi)	3.19 km^{2} (1.23 sq mi)
Population density	443.9/km^{2} (1,150/sq mi)	462.4/km^{2} (1,198/sq mi)	431.6/km^{2} (1,118/sq mi)
Median age	48.4 (M: 48.0, F: 48.4)	46.2 (M: 45.8, F: 46.8)	44.7 (M: 44.2, F: 45.1)
Private dwellings	605 (total) 574 (occupied)	644 (total)	601 (total)
Median household income	$60,800	$49,408	$35,329

Notes: Includes corrections and updates for 2006.
References: 2021 2016 2011

Historical Census Data - Fort-Coulonge, Quebec

Year	Pop.	±%
1891	323	—
1901	482	+49.2%
1911	811	+68.3%
1921	973	+20.0%
1931	1,130	+16.1%
1941	1,072	−5.1%
1951	1,431	+33.5%

Year	Pop.	±%
1956	1,633	+14.1%
1961	1,823	+11.6%
1966	1,846	+1.3%
1971	1,784	−3.4%
1976	1,683	−5.7%
1981	1,616	−4.0%
1986	1,449	−10.3%

Year	Pop.	±%
1991	1,647	+13.7%
1996	1,716	+4.2%
2001	1,661	−3.2%
2006	1,358	−18.2%
2011	1,377	+1.4%
2016	1,433	+4.1%
2021	1,312	−8.4%

Source: Statistics Canada

== Local government ==
List of former mayors:

- Hector Jr Soucie (1968–1999)
- Raymond Durocher (1999–2017)
- Gaston Allard (2017–2020)
- Debbie Laporte (interim 2020)
- Christine Francoeur (2021–2025)
- Pierre Cyr (2025–present)

== See also ==
- Coulonge Chutes
- Cycloparc PPJ - former railway now converted into a bike path
- Esprit Lodge - white water rafting training and certification.
- List of anglophone communities in Quebec
- List of village municipalities in Quebec
