= Pontiac Regional County Municipality =

Pontiac
- Regional county municipality
- Location in province of Quebec
- Coordinates: 46°03′N 76°55′W
- Country: Canada
- Province: Quebec
- Region: Outaouais
- Effective: January 1, 1983
- County seat: Campbell's Bay

Government
  - Type: Prefecture
  - Warden: Jane Toller

Area
  - Total: 14,105.70 km^{2} (5,446.24 sq mi)
  - Land: 12,991.82 km^{2} (5,016.17 sq mi)

Population (2021)
  - Total: 14,764
  - Density: 1.2/km^{2} (3.1/sq mi)
  - Change 2016-2021: ▲3.6%
  - Dwellings: 10,143
- Time zone: UTC−5 (EST)
  - Summer (DST): UTC−4 (EDT)
- Area code: 819
- Website: www.mrcpontiac.qc.ca

Pontiac (French pronunciation: [pɔ̃tjak]) is a regional county municipality in the Outaouais region of Quebec, Canada. Campbell's Bay is the county seat. It should not be confused with the municipality of Pontiac, which is located in the neighbouring Les Collines-de-l'Outaouais Regional County Municipality. For the electoral district see Pontiac (federal electoral district).

== Subdivisions ==
There are 18 subdivisions within the RCM:

Municipalities (15)

- Alleyn-et-Cawood
- Bristol
- Bryson
- Campbell's Bay
- Clarendon
- L'Île-du-Grand-Calumet
- L'Isle-aux-Allumettes
- Litchfield
- Mansfield-et-Pontefract
- Otter Lake
- Rapides-des-Joachims
- Shawville
- Sheenboro
- Thorne
- Waltham

Townships (1)

- Chichester

Villages (2)

- Fort-Coulonge
- Portage-du-Fort

Unorganized Territory (1)

- Lac-Nilgaut

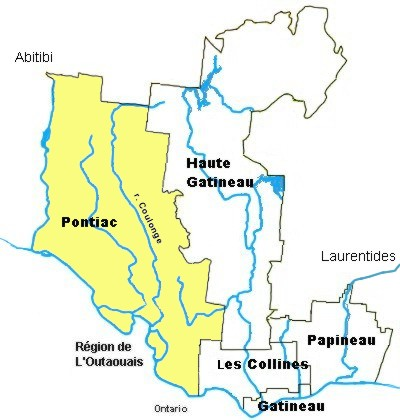
Location of Pontiac in Outaouais Region

== Demographics ==
=== Population ===
Canada census – Pontiac community profile

	2021	2016	2011
Population	14,764 (+3.6% from 2016)	14,251 (-0.7% from 2011)	14,358 (-1.6% from 2006)
Land area	12,824.36 km^{2} (4,951.51 sq mi)	12,991.82 km^{2} (5,016.17 sq mi)	12,992.69 km^{2} (5,016.51 sq mi)
Population density	1.2/km^{2} (3.1/sq mi)	1.1/km^{2} (2.8/sq mi)	1.1/km^{2} (2.8/sq mi)
Median age	52 (M: 51.6, F: 52.4)	50.4 (M: 50.1, F: 50.8)	47.8 (M: 47.3, F: 48.3)
Private dwellings	6,665 (total)	10,208 (total)	9,224 (total)
Median household income		$50,567	$45,675

References: 2021 2016 2011

Historical Census Data - Pontiac Regional County Municipality, Quebec
Year	Pop.	±%
1986	15,100	—
1991	15,111	+0.1%
1996	15,576	+3.1%
2001	14,565	−6.5%
2006	14,586	+0.1%
2011	14,358	−1.6%
2016	14,251	−0.7%

=== Language ===
Canada Census Mother Tongue - Pontiac Regional County Municipality, Quebec
Census	Total	French			English			French & English			Other		
Year	Responses	Count	Trend	Pop %	Count	Trend	Pop %	Count	Trend	Pop %	Count	Trend	Pop %
2016	14,105	5,635	▼1.7%	40.0%	8,020	▲0.1%	56.9%	275	▲10.0%	1.9%	195	▲14.7%	1.4%
2011	14,170	5,735	▼3.3%	40.5%	8,015	▼2.1%	56.7%	250	▲117.4%	1.8%	170	▼15.0%	1.2%
2006	14,435	5,930	▲7.8%	41.1%	8,190	▼0.4%	56.7%	115	▼67.1%	0.8%	200	▼33.3%	1.4%
2001	14,370	5,500	▼7.9%	38.3%	8,220	▼8.7%	57.2%	350	▲29.6%	2.4%	300	▲81.8%	2.1%
1996	15,405	5,970	n/a	38.8%	9,000	n/a	58.4%	270	n/a	1.8%	165	n/a	1.1%
Note: Percentages may not equal 100% due to multiple responses and rounding.

== Transportation ==
=== Access Routes ===
Highways and numbered routes that run through the municipality, including external routes that start or finish at the county border:

- Autoroutes
  - None
- Principal Highways
  - R-148
- Secondary Highways
  - R-301
  - R-303
  - R-366
- External Routes
  - Highway 148

== See also ==
- List of regional county municipalities and equivalent territories in Quebec
- Esprit Lodge
- Cycloparc PPJ
