= Dumoine =

Dumoine may refer to:

- Dumoine River, a river in western Quebec, Canada
- Fort Dumoine, a colonial French trading post in Quebec, Canada
- Lac Dumoine, a lake in southern Quebec, Canada.
- Zec Dumoine, a controlled harvesting zone, in southern Quebec, Canada
