= Rivière à l'Ours (Témiscamingue) =

Location
- Country: Canada
- Province: Quebec
- Region: Abitibi-Témiscamingue
- MRC: Témiscamingue Regional County Municipality
- City: Les Lacs-du-Témiscamingue

Physical characteristics
- Source: Unidentified Lake
  - location: Les Lacs-du-Témiscamingue
  - coordinates: 46°29′25″N 78°09′13″W
  - elevation: 393 m (1,289 ft)
- Mouth: Ottawa River
  - location: Les Lacs-du-Témiscamingue
  - coordinates: 46°14′31″N 77°57′45″W
  - elevation: 142 m (466 ft)
- Length: 38 km (24 mi)

The Rivière à l'Ours is a tributary of the east bank of the Ottawa River. The Bear River crosses the unorganized territory Les Lacs-du-Témiscamingue, in the Témiscamingue Regional County Municipality, in the administrative region of Abitibi-Témiscamingue, in the province of Quebec, in Canada.

From the second half of 19th century, forestry was the predominant economic activity in the sector.

== Geography ==
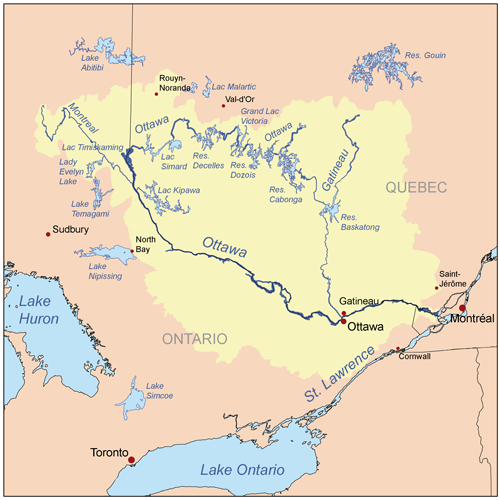
Outaouais river basin.

The watersheds neighbors of the Bear River are:

- north side: Montégron lake, Fildegrand River;
- east side: Buchoitz River, Petite rivière à l'Ours, Fildegrand River, Buchoitz Lake, Sunday Lake, Hart Lake, Small Lake Bear;
- south side: Ottawa River;
- west side: Lake Saint-Cirque, outlet of Lake Saint-Cirque.

An unnamed lake (length: 1.1 km (0.68 mi); altitude: 393 m (1,289 ft)) constitutes the head of the Bear River. This body of water is located west of Bois Franc Lake (altitude: 359 m (1,178 ft)), south of Tom Lake (altitude: 379 m (1,243 ft)) and at south of Lake Montégron (altitude: 351 m (1,152 ft)).

From this head lake, the Bear River flows for 0.8 km (0.50 mi) to Lake Chasy (length: 1.1 km (0.68 mi); altitude: 384 m (1,260 ft); formed of swamp) that the current crosses on 0.5 km (0.31 mi) towards the south. Then the current flows on 2.7 km (1.7 mi) south-west to the outlet of Lac La Noire (altitude: 365 m (1,198 ft)). Then the current flows on 2.3 km (1.4 mi) to the southwest, collecting the waters of Lac de la Fauvette (altitude: 365 m (1,198 ft)) and Lac Esgriseilles (altitude: 386 m (1,266 ft)), to Lac Beaubel (altitude: 356 m (1,168 ft)) which the current crosses over 1.7 km (1.1 mi) to the southeast.

From Lac Beaubel, the Bear River flows for 25 km (16 mi) to the southeast in a valley of the zec Dumoine, then 5.0 km (3.1 mi) to the south. The last 2.6 km (1.6 mi) segment of the river has several rapids. The river pours into the bottom of a bay (4.0 km (2.5 mi)) on the east shore of Holden Lake which is crossed by the Ottawa River.

The mouth of the Bear River is located 3.7 km (2.3 mi) upstream of the mouth of the Petite rivière à l'Ours, 8.5 km (5.3 mi) upstream from the mouth of the Dumoine River and 6.6 km (4.1 mi) downstream from Rocher Capitaine Island.

== Toponymy ==
Animals are used frequently in French Canadian toponymy. The bear is an animal respected for its character and its strength. Its meat is edible. Its bones (after having cut or sharpened them) can be used to make tools (eg scrapers) or weapons. Its skin can be used in particular for clothing, bags, blanket, carpet or shelter. The bear is the subject of several legends, generally of Aboriginal origin.

The toponym Rivière à l'Ours is associated with the neighboring watercourse (east side) which is designated Little Bear River and with the neighboring lake (east side) designated Petit lac à l'Ours.

The toponym Rivière à l'Ours was formalized on December 5, 1968 at the Place Names Bank of the Commission de toponymie du Québec.

== See also ==
- List of rivers of Quebec
