= Petite rivière à l'Ours =

Location
- Country: Canada
- Province: Quebec
- Region: Abitibi-Témiscamingue
- MRC: Témiscamingue Regional County Municipality
- City: Les Lacs-du-Témiscamingue

Physical characteristics
- Source: Unidentified Lake
  - location: Les Lacs-du-Témiscamingue
  - coordinates: 46°19′25″N 78°53′56″W
  - elevation: 359 m (1,178 ft)
- Mouth: Ottawa River
  - location: Les Lacs-du-Témiscamingue
  - coordinates: 46°13′34″N 77°54′54″W
  - elevation: 145 m (476 ft)
- Length: 14 km (8.7 mi)

The Petite rivière à l'Ours (English: Little Bear River) is a tributary of the Ottawa River. La Petite Rivière à l'Ours crosses the unorganized territory Les Lacs-du-Témiscamingue, in the Témiscamingue Regional County Municipality, in the administrative region of Abitibi-Témiscamingue, in the province of Quebec, in Canada.

From the second half of the 19th century, forestry was the predominant economic activity in the sector. Recreational and tourist activities have developed there, especially in the 20th century.

== Geography ==
The neighboring watersheds of the Petite rivière à l'Ours are:

- north side: Fildegrand River;
- east side: Fildegrand River, Dumoine River;
- south side: Ottawa River;
- west side: Rivière à l'Ours, Whitton Lake.

Lake Junco (length: 0.6 km (0.37 mi); altitude: 375 m (1,230 ft)) constitutes the head of the "little Bear river". This body of water is located south and west of the Fildegrand River.

From this head lake, the Petite rivière à l'Ours flows zigzagging over 5.8 km (3.6 mi) towards the southwest, in particular by crossing Lake Loriot and marsh areas, until to an unnamed lake receiving the outlet (coming from the northwest) from Whitton Lake (length: 0.8 km (0.50 mi); altitude: 376 m (1,234 ft)), which the current crosses 280 m (920 ft) to the southwest.

From there, the Petite rivière à l'Ours flows for 3.5 km (2.2 mi) south in Zec Dumoine to the north shore of Petit lac à l'Ours (length: 1.7 km (1.1 mi); altitude: 271 m (889 ft)) which receives the discharge (coming from the northwest) of Parogee Lake (length: 0.6 km (0.37 mi) ), then 4.7 km (2.9 mi) to the south-east in a small valley. The river pours into the bottom of a bay (275 m (902 ft)) on the east bank of the Ottawa River, in Holden Lake, facing Grants Creek (Ontario) and Pichette Bay (Ontario).

The mouth of the Petite rivière à l'Ours is located 3.7 km (2.3 mi) downstream of the mouth of the rivière à l'Ours and 4.8 km (3.0 mi) upstream of the mouth of the Dumoine River.

== Toponymy ==
Animals are used frequently in French Canadian toponymy. The bear is an animal respected for its character and its strength. Its meat is edible. Its bones (after having been cut or sharpened) can be used to make tools, such as scrapers, or weapons. Its skin can be used in particular for clothing, bags, blankets, carpets or shelter. The bear is the subject of several legends, generally of Aboriginal origin.

The toponym Petite rivière à l'Ours is associated with the nearby watercourse (west side) which is designated rivière à l'Ours.

The toponym Petite rivière à l'Ours was formalized on 5 December 1968 at the Commission de toponymie du Québec.

== See also ==
- List of rivers of Quebec
