= Zec de Rapides-des-Joachims =

- Location within Quebec
- Location: Canada, Quebec, Pontiac Regional County Municipality
- Nearest city: Lac-Nilgaut, unorganized territory
- Coordinates: 46°24′00″N 77°33′00″W
- Area: 960.1 square kilometres (370.7 sq mi)
- Established: 1979
- Governing body: Association chasse et pêche Rapides-des-Joachims

The ZEC Rapides-des-Joachims is a "zone d'exploitation contrôlée" (Controlled harvesting zone) (ZEC) located north of Rapides-des-Joachims, in the Pontiac Regional County Municipality, in the region of Outaouais, Quebec, Canada.

== Geography ==
ZEC is mainly a hunting and fishing territory bordered to the south by the Ottawa River and to the west by the Dumoine River. The Zec is bordered on the east side by the Zec Saint-Patrice and to the west by the Zec Dumoine.

Major lakes of Zec are (mainly French names): Aberdeen, Aumond, Beauclair, Champagne, Charrette, Croche, D'Eau Morte, De l'Île, De l'Isle-Dieu, De l'Ours, Des Vases, Dontenwill, Du Carcajou, Du Hibou, Du Lièvre, Du Pinceau, Gilibert, Hogan, Klinge, L'Isle-Adam, La Ligne, La Truite, Lernaut, Monredon, Moore, Pehr-Kalm, Penniseault, Poiriot, Prinsac, Rochebrune, Sérien, Solière, Tap and Trout.

ZEC provides to users six campgrounds (especially rustic) on its territory: camping Hare Lake, Lake Charette, Lake Croche, Dumoine River, "Lac du Pinceau" (Brush Lake) and Lake Dontenwill.

The main entrance of the ZEC is located on the south side, near the bridge over the Ottawa River, is north of the town of Rolphton by Ontario. This bridge is located between the Cotton Bay (downstream) and Lake Mc Connell (upstream). ZEC also includes an entrance station at north of its territory.

== Hunting and fishing ==
The hunting is on the ZEC depending the periods, hunting gear used, the sex of animals slaughtered (original) for the following species: moose, black bear, white-tailed deer and hare.

Fishing is subject to quotas in the ZEC in terms of limit and possession for the following species: brook trout, lake trout, moulac, perch, Muskie, pike, walleye, bass and whitefish.

== See also ==
- Rapides-des-Joachims
- Pontiac Regional County Municipality
- Outaouais, administrative region
- Rolphton, municipality of Ontario
- Zone d'exploitation contrôlée (Controlled harvesting zone) (ZEC)
