= Saint-Cyr River (Ottawa River tributary) =

Saint-Cyr
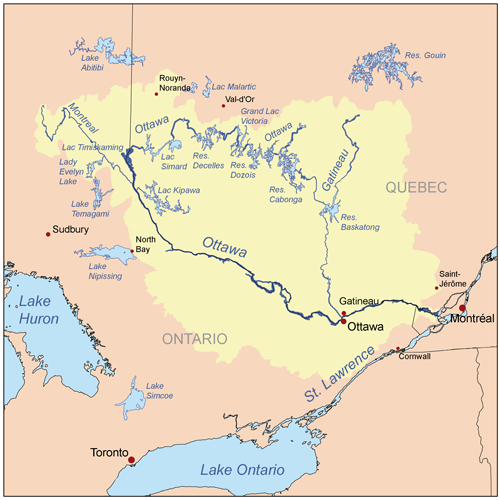
- Watershed of Ottawa River

Location
- Country: Canada
- Province: Quebec
- Region: Outaouais

Physical characteristics
- Source: La Truite Lake
  - location: Rapides-des-Joachims, Quebec, Pontiac Regional County Municipality (RCM), Outaouais, Quebec
  - coordinates: 46°20′23″N 77°36′23″W
  - elevation: 362 m (1,188 ft)
- Mouth: Ottawa River
  - location: Sheenboro, Quebec, Pontiac Regional County Municipality (RCM), Outaouais, Quebec
  - coordinates: 46°10′55″N 77°37′40″W
  - elevation: 120 m (390 ft)
- Length: 25.0 km (15.5 mi)

Basin features
- Tributaries
  - left: (upstream); Boom River

The Saint-Cyr River /ˌseɪntˈsɪər/ is a tributary of the eastern shore of the Ottawa River. The Saint-Cyr River flows into the Municipality Rapides-des-Joachims, then from Sheenboro into the Regional County Municipality (MRC) Pontiac Regional County Municipality, in Outaouais administrative region, in Quebec, in Canada.

== Geography ==
The hydrographic slopes adjacent to the Saint-Cyr River are:
- north side: Poussière River, Dontenwill Lake, Bronson Lake;
- east side: Boom River, Marie-Jeanne Creek;
- south side: Ottawa River;
- west side: Penniseault Creek.

"Lac la Truite" (English: Troot Lake) (length: 2.4 km, altitude: 355 m) is the headwaters of the Saint-Cyr River.

From "Lac la Truite", the Saint-Cyr River flows over:

- 2.6 km to the southwest, to the outlet (coming from the north-west) of Fontaine Lake (altitude: 314 m);
- 2.0 km southerly to the outlet (from the east) of Nuage Lake (elevation: 312 m);
- 3.3 km to the southwest, to the outlet (coming from the west) of Braun Lake (altitude: 300 m);
- 2.2 km southerly to the Bory Lake outlet (from the northwest) (elevation 288 m);
- 360 m to the south, to the mouth of the outlet (coming from the southeast) of Lac Sérien (altitude: 267 m;
- 2.5 km to the southwest, to the outlet (coming from the north) of Bonpland Lake (altitude: 301 m);
- 2.3 km southerly to the north shore of Aberdeen Lake;
- 1.2 km crossing Aberdeen Lake to the south (length: 0.4 km, altitude: 212 m);
- 5.0 km to the south, to the mouth of the Boom river (coming from the north) which in particular drains the "Lac de la Touche" (altitude: 168 m);
- 1.0 km southeast across rapids to the outlet (from the north-east) of Walls Lake (elevation 190 m) and Lac des Amis (elevation 274 m);
- 2.6 km (or 1.4 km direct line) southerly passing west of the James Little Little Ecological Reserve and zigzagging to the mouth.
The Saint-Cyr River is a tributary of the northeastern shore of the Ottawa River. The mouth of the Saint-Cyr River is located almost opposite the mouth of "Tee Creek" (Tee Creek - Ontario), 4.1 km downstream of Rapides-des-Joachims, Quebec and 1.1 km downstream of "Point Stewart" (Ontario).

== Toponymy ==
The former name of the river was "Boom West Brook", as opposed to the branch being referred to as "Boom Creek" in this hydrographic slope.

The toponym "Saint-Cyr River" was formalized on December 5, 1968, at the Commission de toponymie du Québec.

== See also ==
- Sheenboro, a municipality
- Ottawa River, a watercourse
- Boom River, a watercourse
- James Little Little Ecological Reserve
- List of rivers of Quebec
