= Zec Restigo =

- Location within Quebec
- Location: Canada, Quebec, Témiscamingue Regional County Municipality
- Nearest city: Témiscaming
- Coordinates: 46°36′51″N 78°21′59″W
- Area: 127,090 square kilometres (49,070 sq mi)
- Governing body: L'Association protectrice de la faune de Témiscaming

The ZEC Restigo is a "zone d'exploitation contrôlée" (controlled harvesting zone) (ZEC) located the unorganized territory Les Lacs-du-Témiscamingue, in the Témiscamingue Regional County Municipality, in the administrative region of Abitibi-Témiscamingue, Quebec, Canada.

ZEC is administered by the "Association protectrice de la faune de Témiscaming" (Wildlife Protective Association of Temiscaming), which is a non-profit organization.

== Geography ==
Zec Restigo is located in the Témiscamingue Regional County Municipality, east of the city of Temiscaming. It is connected to the southeast to the Zec Dumoine, south to the Zec Maganasipi and north to the Zec de Kipawa. Zec Restigo is bounded:

- in the north by the Sorry lake and the "Petit lac du marécage" (Little Lake of the Swamp)
- in North-east by the river "du pin Blanc" (White pine river)
- in by lakes Cotentré and "à la truite" (Trout Lake)
- in South-west of "Lake de la Tête d'Orignal" (Moose Head Lake)
- in the east by "Lac du Cochon" (Lake of the Pig)

The main rivers are the ZEC: Kipawa (west), Des Jardins, Fildegrand (southeast) and Pin Blanc (White Pine) (east).

Major lakes

Major lakes in Zec are (mainly French names): À la Truite, Athabascan, Aux Huards, Avon, Beaver, Bryson, Caughey, Caugnawana, Chanty, Charette, Clair, Contentré, De l'Index, De la Gélinotte, De la Tête d'Orignal, Des Îles, Des Jardins, Des Sables, Du Cochon, Du Goéland, Du Marais, Du Micmac, Du Papillon, Eddie, En demi-lune, Hamilton, Homard, Katakwatciwanacik, Klondike, La Garde, Lépine, Lindsay, Line, Long, Lune, Maganasipi (Green Lake), Montégion, Petit lac Caugnawana, Petit lac des Jardins, Petit lac du marécage, Plantin, Pombert, Restigo, Sableux, Sairs (Brennan), Sorry, Sparks, Swansea, Thompson, Ti-Ri et Welsinger.

Entrance stations

- Home path Maniwaki (main entrance). Path to get there: From Ontario to North Bay. North Bay to Temiscaming via Highway 63 (72 km). The entrance station is located at 1200, chemin Maniwaki in Kipawa, 12 km east of Temiscaming.
- PRONATURE Temiscaming (secondary entrance).

== Hunting and fishing ==
ZEC has 91 lakes, 35 lakes are used for recreational fishing. Four rivers cross the territory of which two are used for recreative fishing.

Species subject to quotas for hunting wildlife animal are: moose, white-tailed deer, Hare, grouse and black bear. The quota varies according to the particular species, hunting gear, sex of the beasts (deer and moose).

As for sport fishing in the ZEC, the species of fish quotas depending on the time of year and the water bodies are: lake trout, brook trout, gold pike and bass.

== Key benefits ==
The Turner Falls on the Kipawa River, north of Lake Sairs (Brennan) worth visiting.

ZEC has over 120 campsites in 16 camping spots semi-furnished (or rustic), which are: Lac du Fils 2, Desjardins Nord, Fils 1, Petit Desjardins, Tête d'Orignal, Lac Maganasipi, Du Fils 2 Sud, Lac du Fils Sud 1, Du Fils Ouest, Du Fils Nord-Ouest, Rivière Desjardins, Lac Bleau, Petit Caugnawana, Caugnawana, Desjardins Sud et La Garde.

== Toponymy ==
The name "ZEC Restigo" is derived from Lake Restigo which is a major body of water in the center of the ZEC.

The name "ZEC Restigo" was formalized on 5 August 1982 at the Bank of place names in the Commission de toponymie du Québec (Geographical Names Board of Québec).

== See also ==
- Témiscamingue Regional County Municipality (RCM)
- Abitibi-Témiscamingue, administrative region of Quebec
- Kipawa, municipality
- Temiscaming, municipality
- Zone d'exploitation contrôlée (Controlled Harvesting Zone) (ZEC)
