= Zec Saint-Patrice =

- Location within Quebec
- Location: Canada, Quebec, Pontiac Regional County Municipality, Lac-Nilgaut,
- Nearest city: Rapides-des-Joachims
- Coordinates: 46°13′00″N 77°19′00″W
- Area: 1,348 square kilometres (520 sq mi)
- Established: 1980
- Governing body: Association Chasse et pêche, alliance des six zec St-Patrice

The zec Saint-Patrice is a "zone d'exploitation contrôlée" (controlled harvesting zone) (ZEC) along the Ottawa River of 28 km below Rapides-des-Joachims, in Pontiac Regional County Municipality, in the administrative region of Outaouais, in Quebec, in Canada.

== Geography ==
Zec shares its boundary with the Zec de Rapides-des-Joachims, James-Little Ecological Reserve and Ruisseau-de-l'Indien Ecological Reserve. Its territory is including the Old forest of River Schyan.

Established in 1980, the zec increased its territory in 1983 from 1,289 to 1,354 square kilometres (498 to 523 sq mi). Its area was both narrowed southeast and increased specifically north of Lac Saint-Patrice, a very large body of water, which the zec gets its name. The serpentine Noire River serves as a boundary to the north, and Aumond Creek at the northwest end.

Of the hundreds of hunting and fishing lodges in the ZEC, a large number of them are around Lake Saint-Patrice.

== See also ==
=== Related articles ===
- Pontiac Regional County Municipality (RCM)
- Outaouais, administrative region
- Rapides-des-Joachims, municipality
- Zone d'exploitation contrôlée (Controlled Harvesting Zone) (zec)

=== External links ===
Official website of zec Saint-Patrice
