= Zec Dumoine =

Controlled harvesting zone in Quebec, Canada

- Location within Quebec
- Location: Canada, Quebec, Témiscamingue Regional County Municipality
- Coordinates: 46°28′00″N 77°56′00″W
- Area: 1,500 square kilometres (580 sq mi)
- Established: 1978

The zec Dumoine is a controlled harvesting zone (French: Zone d'exploitation contrôlée (ZEC)) located in the unorganized territory of Les Lacs-du-Témiscamingue, in the MRC Témiscamingue Regional County Municipality, in the administrative region of Abitibi-Témiscamingue, in Quebec, in Canada.

== Geography ==
The zec is the fourth largest ZEC in Quebec, with an area of 1500 km^{2}. ZEC Dumoine is located north of the Ottawa River. Its territory is between:

- the Zec de Rapides-des-Joachims on the east side. The Dumoine River (flowing to the south) serves as a demarcation between these two ZECs, that is between Lake Laforge (to the north) and the Ottawa River (at the height of Holden Lake);
- the zec Restigo and the zec Maganasipi, which are located on the west side.

The main lakes of the zec are: "À la Course", Alma, Au Sable, Aux Sangsues, Benwah, Benwah, Burton, Cabazié, Cardinal, Cibardin, Cranberry, Cullin, De l'Alouette, De l'Autour, De la Rifle, Nyctale, Dizon, Domergue, Hardwood, Busard, Carcajou, Hummingbird, Owl, Owl, Lorikeet, Pipit, Plankton, Roselin, Tangara, Duck Pond, Duncan, Emma, Esgriseilles, Fildegrand, Gosselin, Grant, Hall, Hanwell, Jacques, Kinepik, La Rabeyre, Lebeau, Long, Malouin, Nouveau, Patricia, Paul-Joncas, Perdu, Petit lac Russell, Revolver, Robinson, Russell, Russell, Saint- Circus, Unnamed, Sauvole, Skead, Stubbs and West Trout.

Visitors access the ZEC by taking Highway 17 in Ontario to Rolphton (Ontario). Then they use the route 635 to Rapides-des-Joachims. The reception desk is located at 3, rue Principale. Then, to access the territory, visitors must travel 26 km on the zec de Rapides-des-Joachims.

== History ==
Forestry

Logging in the current zec territory began in 1850 when two logging companies (the ancestors of E. B. Eddy and Consolidated Bathurst) began cutting white pines, which were abundant southeast of Témiscamingue. Besides, north of ZEC Dumoine, two hydronyms are significant: Lac du Pin blanc and the Rivière du Pin blanc. This type of wood was in high demand on the European shipbuilding market, as it was used in particular for masts of sailing ships. From these times, the shipowners manufactured more and more hybrid boats, propelled by steam engines and also with sail; which constituted safety in the event of engine damage and lower cost by using the force of the wind.

The exploitation of this resource required the development of forest roads and ice roads for the transport of people, goods and animals. They also set up stables for horses, shelters for provisions, equipment and goods, lumber camps and even forest farms. Despite the harsh climate, these farms allowed the raising of animals for meat and milk; in addition, it made it possible to harvest some cereals and hay to feed the animals. Once cut and limbed, the tree trunks were pulled to the Dumoine River or its tributaries. As soon as the snow melted, leading to the flooding of the water, steam boats (called "Aligator steam boat") hauled the tree trunks which then descended on the Ottawa River.

Timber floating often required the intervention of log drivers because of log jams in rapids or falls. To prevent the logs from being damaged by hitting the rocks, log slides have been fitted out by the logging companies or their subcontractors. The logs were directed towards these slides in order to cross these rapids or falls. Even today, observers can see some vestiges of these ancient slides by the river.

Native American history

Formerly, the territory of ZEC Dumoine was frequented by the Otaguottouemins, member of an Algonquin community. The families of this community generally lived in semi-nomadism according to the needs of hunting, gathering of small wild fruits (strawberries, raspberries, bluets ...), protection, Native American trade ... Floods caused by beavers and forest fires were both constraints and benefits. With regret, the terrible Spanish grid of 1918 entirely decimated this community.

== Fort Dumoine ==
Fort Dumoine was built around 1730 at the mouth of the Dumoine River, northwest side of the Ottawa River (Quebec side). This site was recognized for a very long time as a place of meeting and exchanges between the Atikamekw, the Hurons and other Amerindian nations of the North. Trade in the form of barter was in use between the various communities Amerindian. The Ottawa River was a passageway in river boats, including canoe and rabaska.

According to the section of the Dumoine River, the Algonquins baptized it "Aginagwasi sipi", "Cakawitopikak Sipi" and "Ekonakwasi Sipi" meaning "Alder River" because of the many alders found on each side of its banks and river of desire.

A 1755 map by Jacques-Nicolas Bellin says "Acounagousin". Lotter, in 1762, and Carver, in 1776, designate this river in the same way and attribute lake “Caouinagamic” as its source.

In 1762, on the way to Sault Sainte-Marie (modern Sault Ste. Marie, Ontario and Sault Ste. Marie, Michigan), Alexander Henry passed opposite the mouth of the Dumoine River. He then notes: "At the mouth of the Du Moine river, there is another fort or trading post, where I found a small encampment of Maskegons Indians with whom I exchanged several articles for furs."

Abandoned in 1761, Fort Dumoine resumed its activities thanks to the North West Company in 1784. The 1801 map of Alexander Mackenzie indicates the course of the Dumoin river, without however going back to its source. In 1811, Fort Dumoine became the property of the Hudson's Bay Company and did not cease these activities until 1860 because of the logging companies which, by destroying wildlife habitats, almost destroyed the beavers. The site was completely flooded by Holden Lake, following the construction of the Des-Joachims dam from 1946.

At a place called "Indian Point" (real name "Mos Sakik"), at the confluence of Lake Dumoine and the Orignal River, an Anishinaabe community lived until 1918. A terrible flu epidemic almost decimated the village and only eight people, including three children, survived and left to join another community in Kipawa.

== Hunting and fishing ==
The zec territory is located at the meeting of two important ecosystems: the boreal forest and the mixed forest. This forest territory includes a diversity of habitats, each with specific characteristics, in particular: large mature trees, trees with rare species and areas where wildlife is abundant. This variety of habitats generates a diversity of animal species that inhabit it. ZEC has listed more than 120 species of birds and noted a strong presence of turtles.

As game is generally abundant in ZEC Dumoine, rifle hunting is generally practiced. From now on, the moose, bow or black powder hunting package includes the possibility of killing a white-tailed deer. On the territory of the zec, hunting is subject to quotas according to the sex of the animals (originals and white-tailed deer), hunting gear and the season periods for the following species: moose, white-tailed deer, black bear, hare, grouse and grouse. The zec allocates hunting zones on its territory according to the packages.

There are also quotas for the following species: pike, brook trout, moulac, lake trout and walleye.

== Toponymy ==
The toponym "Zec Dumoine" is linked to a set of toponyms including that of the river, the fort, a lake and a small lake. The original name comes from the name of the trading post built around 1730 at the mouth of the Dumoine River, on the northwest side of the Ottawa River. According to different source, the purpose of this fort was to facilitate trade with the Anishinaabes and to protect them against the raids of the Iroquois.

Originally, the name Dumoine designated the territory of the watershed of the lake and the Dumoine river. Several historians consider that this toponym would have been retained in memory of a member of a renowned family of French merchants. In 1697, Sieur d'Iberville, his younger brother Jean-Baptiste Le Moyne and a handful of men paddled on the Ottawa River to confront the English in Hudson Bay. They later explored Mississippi and Jean-Baptiste Le Moyne earned a place in history as the founder of New Orleans.

The toponym "zec Dumoine" was formalized on August 5, 1982 at the Place Names Bank of the Commission de toponymie du Québec.

== See also ==
=== Related articles ===
- Les Lacs-du-Témiscamingue, unorganized territory
- Témiscamingue Regional County Municipality (MRC)
- Abitibi-Témiscamingue, administrative region of Quebec
- Ottawa River
- Dumoine River
- Holden Lake
- Fort Dumoine
- Zec de Rapides-des-Joachims
- Zec Restigo
- Zec Maganasipi
- Controlled harvesting zone (ZEC)
