= Lac Dumoine =

Lake in Quebec, Canada

- Location within Quebec
- Location: Les Lacs-du-Témiscamingue, Abitibi-Témiscamingue, Quebec
- Coordinates: 46°54′34″N 77°53′39″W
- Primary inflows: Rivière aux Écorces; Rivière D'loringal
- Primary outflows: Kipawa River Dumoine River
- Basin countries: Canada
- Surface area: 81 km^{2} (31 sq mi)
- Shore length^{1}: 161 km (100 mi)
- Surface elevation: 311 m (1,020 ft)
- ^{1} Shore length is not a well-defined measure.

Lac Dumoine is a lake in Abitibi-Témiscamingue region, in southern Quebec, Canada.
