= Fort Dumoine =

- On Ottawa River, in Zec Dumoine, in Pontiac Regional County Municipality, in Abitibi-Témiscamingue, in Quebec, Canada

Site information
- Type: Fortress
- Controlled by: France up to 1760, then British government

Location
- Coordinates: 46.21651°N 77.85194°W

Site history
- Built: Built circa 1730
- In use: XVIIIth and XIXth centuries; cessation of activities in 1860

The Fort Dumoine was a trading post built under the French regime in New France and located at the confluence of the Dumoine River and the Ottawa River, northwest side. This location is now in South-East part of Zec Dumoine, in Pontiac Regional County Municipality, in Outaouais region, in province of Quebec, in Canada.

Its purpose was to facilitate trade with the Anishinaabe and to protect them against the raids of the Iroquois. The fort was built on a place of meeting and exchange used for a long time by the Atikamekw, Hurons, and other North Amerindian nations.

In 1762, Alexander Henry passed through the mouth of the Dumoine, en route to Sault Ste-Marie. He noted that

at the mouth of the Du Moine river, is another fort or trading post, where I found a small encampment of Maskegons Indians with whom I exchanged several articles for furs.

Abandoned, the Fort Dumoine resumed its activities, thanks to the North West Company in 1784. The 1801 map by Alexander Mackenzie [4] indicates the course of the Du Moine river but does not go back to its source.

In 1811, it became the property of the Hudson's Bay Company and did not cease its activities until 1860 because of the logging companies which, by destroying wildlife habitats, almost destroyed the beavers. The site was completely flooded by Holden Lake, following the construction of the Des Joachims dam from 1946.

== See also ==
- List of French forts in North America
