= Rivière-Kipawa, Quebec =

Rivière-Kipawa was a former unorganized territory in the Abitibi-Témiscamingue region of Quebec, Canada.

In October 2005 it ceased to exist and its territory was split into the two new unorganized territories of Laniel and Lacs-du-Témiscamingue.
