= Zec Maganasipi =

- Location within Quebec
- Location: Canada, Quebec, Témiscamingue Regional County Municipality
- Nearest city: Rivière-Kipawa
- Coordinates: 46°25′00″N 78°28′00″W
- Area: 1,012 km^{2} (391 sq mi)
- Established: 1978

The ZEC Maganasipi is a "zone d'exploitation contrôlée" (controlled harvesting zone) (ZEC), located in the unorganized territory of Rivière-Kipawa, in the Témiscamingue Regional County Municipality, in the administrative region of Abitibi-Témiscamingue, in Quebec, in Canada and on the lands of the Algonquin Nation.

Annually, the outdoor activities on the ZEC are intense from May to October, with camping, mountain biking, hunting, fishing and walking in the forest trails. The mission of the ZEC includes the protection of flora and fauna.

== Geography ==
Located in the Témiscamingue Regional County Municipality, Zec Maganasipi is bordered to the south by the Holden Lake, formed by a widening of the Ottawa River, which is the border between the Algonquin Nation land of Quebec and Ontario. Covering an area of 1012 square kilometers, the ZEC has a large number of water bodies of which Allouez and McCraken lakes are the main one.

The northern boundary of the ZEC is Maganasipi lake which is located outside of the ZEC. The whole ZEC is drained by rivers Maganasipi (30 km long), Maganasipi East and West Maganasipi. The latter two rivers are tributaries of the first serves as discharge to the lake of the same name to the Ottawa River. The entrance station of Zec is located in Lake Garcin.

== Hunting and fishing ==
The territory of the ZEC abounds in fish (brook trout, lake trout, northern pike) and wild animals (moose, black bears and various small species). Major lakes of Zec which are quotas for recreational fishing are: Boivie, Forgie, The Vernède, McArthur, Percival and Slide.

== Toponymy ==
The name of the ZEC is directly associated with its major water features: lakes, rivers, roads, pond. According to Father Lemoine, this name is a derivative of Maingan Sipi which in Algonquin means "rivière aux loups" (river of wolves). This name appears on maps from 1906, sometimes under the form of Maganasibi Maganasippi. The toponym River Maganasipi was formalized in 1916 in the Gazetteer. A recent survey revealed the existence of another Algonquin place name, Nimakin Sipi, which translates into two rivers coming out of the lake.

Long ago, the lake was designated Maganasipi Kaocawackwakamik Sakaikan, resulting in Green Lake and also Green Lake by the "Club de chasse et de pêche Caughnawana" (Hunting and fishing Caughnawana Club). A place now defunct known under toponyme Maganasipi, was developed early in the 20th century, under pressure from loggers; he was served by a post office from 1923 to 1945.

The name Zec Maganasipi was officialized on August 5, 1982 at the Bank of place names of the Commission de toponymie du Québec (Geographical Names Board of Quebec).

== See also ==
=== Related articles ===
- Rivière-Kipawa, unorganized territory
- Témiscamingue, regional county municipality (RCM)
- Abitibi-Témiscamingue, administrative region of Quebec
- Zone d'exploitation contrôlée (Controlled Harvesting Zone)
