= Sheenboro =

- Municipality
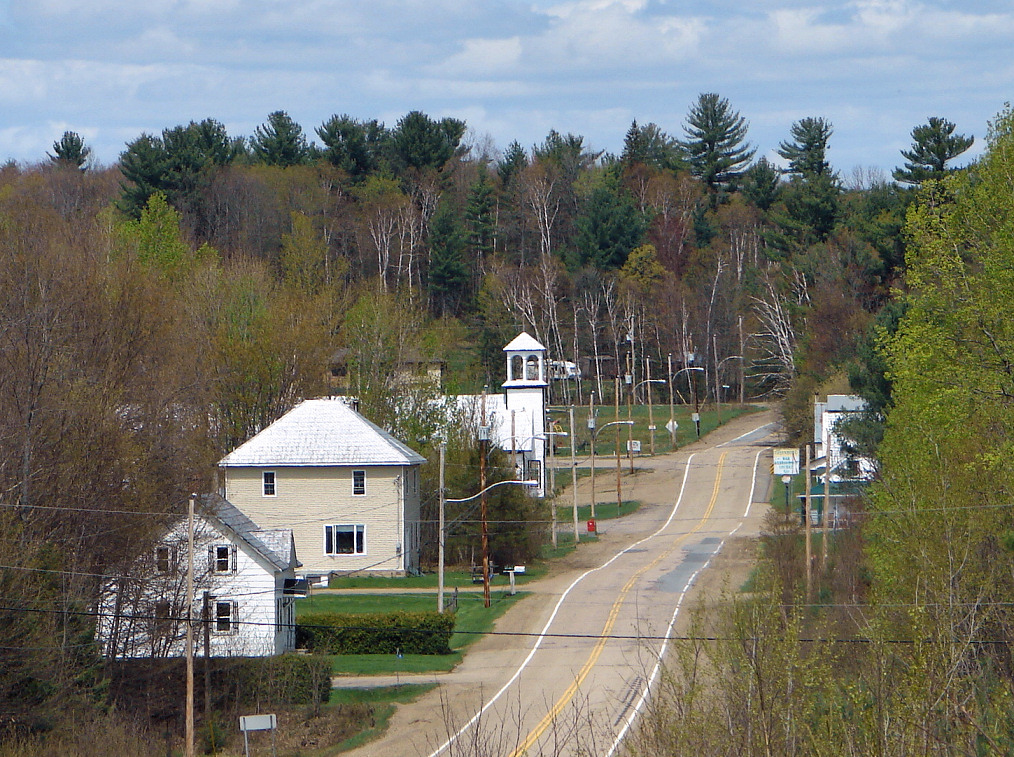

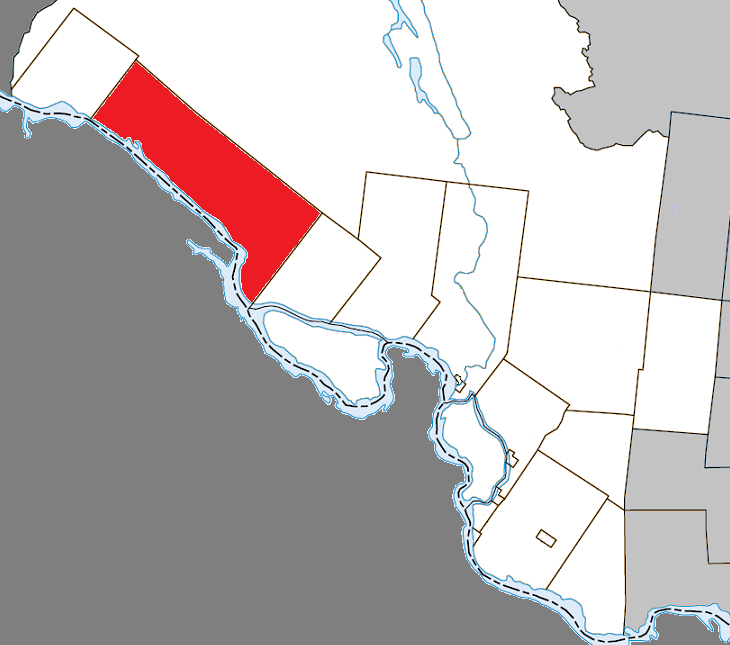
- Location within Pontiac RCM

- Location in western Quebec
- Coordinates: 45°58′N 77°14′W
- Country: Canada
- Province: Quebec
- Region: Outaouais
- RCM: Pontiac
- Constituted: January 1, 1869

Government
  - Mayor: Doris Ranger
  - Federal riding: Pontiac—Kitigan Zibi
  - Prov. riding: Pontiac

Area
  - Total: 634.33 km^{2} (244.92 sq mi)
  - Land: 565.43 km^{2} (218.31 sq mi)

Population (2021)
  - Total: 126
  - Density: 0.3/km^{2} (0.78/sq mi)
  - Pop (2016-21): ▼3.1%
  - Dwellings: 197
- Time zone: UTC−5 (EST)
  - Summer (DST): UTC−4 (EDT)
- Postal code(s): J0X 2Z0
- Area code: 819
- Highways: No major routes
- Website: www.sheenboro.ca

Sheenboro is a village and municipality in the Outaouais region, part of the Pontiac Regional County Municipality, Quebec, Canada. It was formerly known as Sheen-Esher-Aberdeen-et-Malakoff. Its territory stretches along the north shore of the Ottawa River from Chichester to Rapides-des-Joachims.

Because of its Irish heritage, Sheenboro retained the character of being a "Little Corner of Ireland". Primarily dependent on farming and logging, it is also a popular location for tourism, swelling its summer population up to 500 persons. The Fort William Trading Post (now Hotel Pontiac), including the factor's house and church, is a historical site and heritage village with a popular beach in the summer. It is also home to a sacred Algonquin burial ground.

== Geography ==
The municipality is sparsely populated, with its population concentrated in the two communities of Sheenboro and Fort William, and along the Ottawa River, all in the south-eastern part of its territory. The isolated hamlets of Schyan Point, located at the confluence of the Schyan and Ottawa Rivers (almost across from Deep River, Ontario), and Fraser Landing, on the Ottawa River in Malakoff Township, are no more than a handful of seasonally-occupied cabins and have no paved road connection to them.

The remainder of the municipality is undeveloped Canadian Shield wilderness, most of which is part of a controlled exploitation zone. Its rugged terrain rises from about 110 metres (360 ft) above sea level at the hamlet of Fort William to over 180 metres (590 ft) at the village of Sheenboro, reaching 430 metres (1,410 ft) northwest of Trout Lake. Heading north from the hamlet of Schyan Point, the land rises gradually from 121 metres (397 ft) to the peak of Mount Martin at 411 metres (1,348 ft).

Notable lakes within the municipality include Dufoe, Esher, Manny, McCool, McGillivray, L'Oiseau, and Lackey Lakes, and numerous other bodies of water of lesser importance, such as Sheen, McDonald, Trout, Tremblay, and Greer Lakes.

== History ==
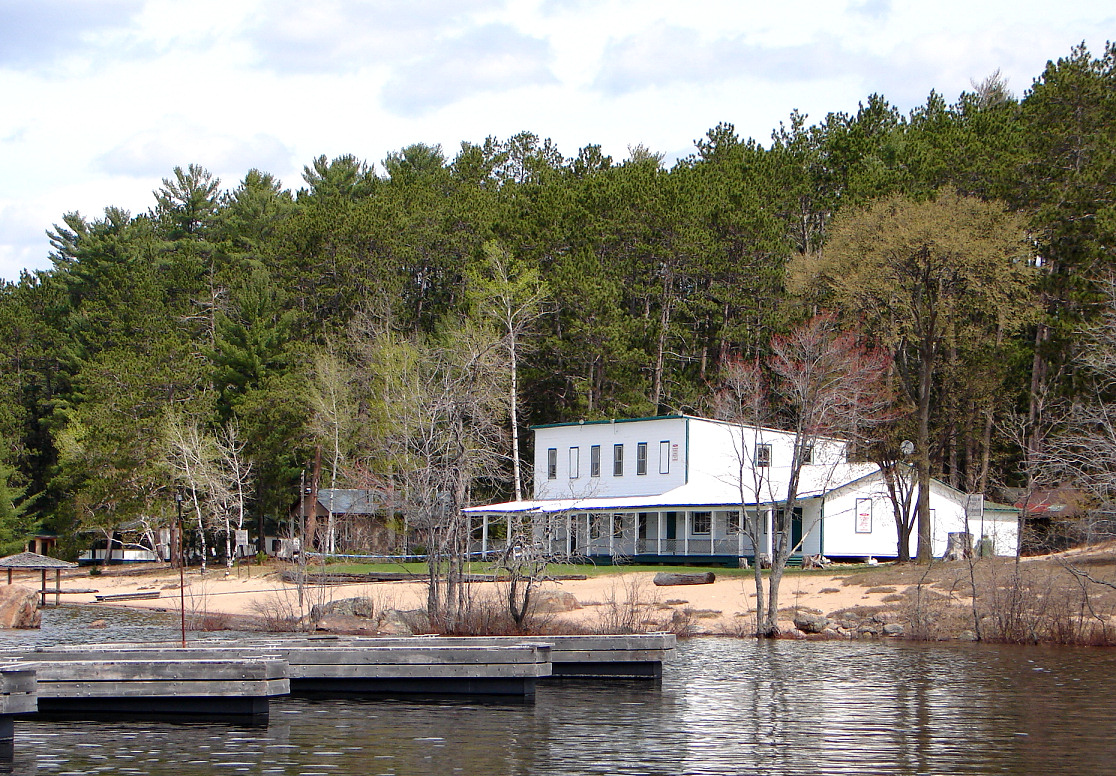
Fort William, now a restaurant and bar

In 1823, John Siveright, factor of the Hudson's Bay Company in charge of Fort-Coulonge, sent John McLean upstream to build a post at Lac des Allumettes. The post had to compete with many petty traders, including one who was already on the site. Because the fur trade couldn't cover the post's expenses, a farm was added in the 1830s in order to sell provisions to lumber companies for their camps. At the same time, settlers began to move into the area. By 1844 it was handling the bulk of the Indian trade in the region. Hector McKenzie, in charge from 1845 to 1864, made the post profitable by dealing with lumber companies and settlers. He built an unusually large two-story house which is still standing.

In 1848 a post office was established and the name changed from Lac des Allumettes to Fort William in honour of William McGillivray. It was a long-established custom for Indians to come to Lac des Allumettes to meet with Jesuits from Montreal and solemnize baptisms and marriages. Following this, a great feast was held. In 1857, the HBC built an Indian church. Due to freight costs, competition, and the advent of steam transportation, the HBC sold Fort William in 1869 for $3000 and moved its operations to Pembroke, Ontario. The site was on the north bank of the Chenal de la Culbute north of Allumette Island.

On the Gale and Duberger map of 1795, the Townships of Sheen, Esher, and Hastings are already shown, even though these townships would not be officially established until several decades later. Respectively, these townships were probably named after an English village in north Surrey County (now the London Borough of Richmond upon Thames), a residential suburb in south-west London, and the English town of Hastings. Hastings Township was renamed to Malakoff in 1856, commemorating the French victory in the Battle of Malakoff.

In the 1830s, Irish people, escaping famine and religious persecution, began to settle in the area and in 1848, a post office was opened in Fort William. In 1849, the Township of Sheen was established, and six years later the Township Municipality of Sheen was formed with Thomas Harrington as its first mayor.

In 1869, the townships of Esher, Malakoff, and Aberdeen became part of Sheen, forming the United Township Municipality of Sheen-Esher-Aberdeen-Malakoff. One year later, the Sheenboro post office was opened and a store and hotel was built by Michael Hayes. Shortly after in 1872, the St-Paul-the-Hermit parish church was built after the original church was destroyed by fire.

In 1960, the territory of the former Aberdeen Township was added to Rapides-des-Joachims, but the United Township Municipality retained its full name. In 1968, the post office in Fort William closed.

On October 11, 2003, the name and status of the United Township Municipality of Sheen-Esher-Aberdeen-Malakoff changed to become the Municipality of Sheenboro.

== Demographics ==
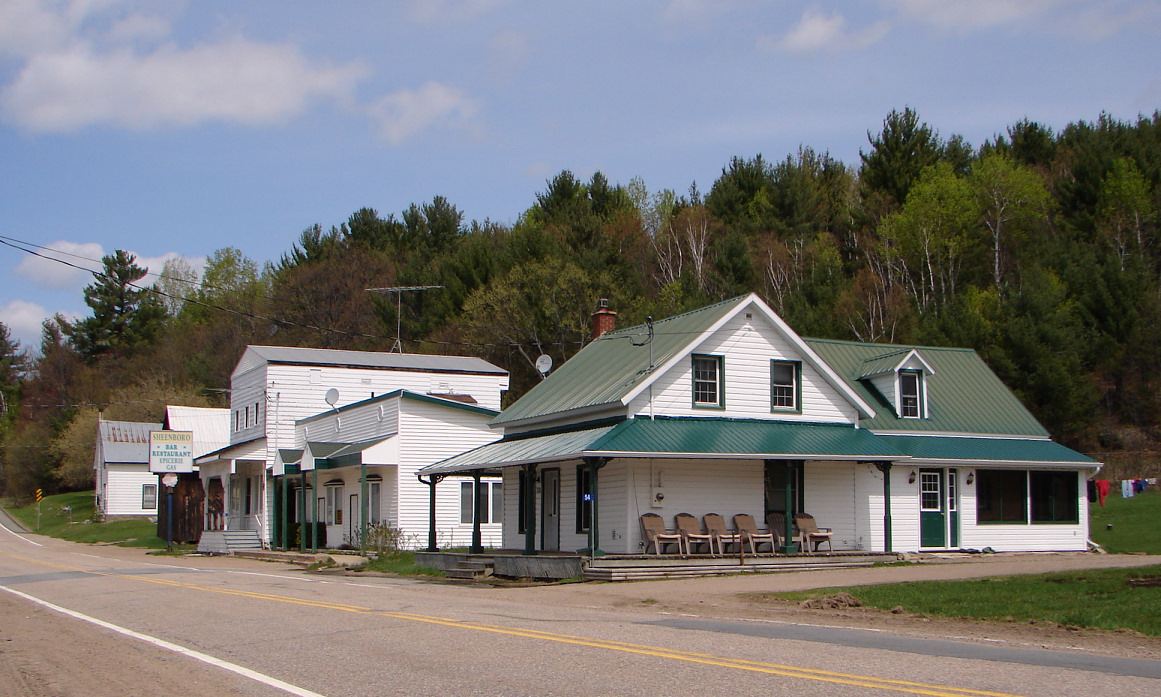
Sheenboro

Canada census – Sheenboro community profile

	2021	2016	2011
Population	126 (-3.1% from 2016)	130 (0% from 2011)	130 (-22.2% from 2006)
Land area	565.43 km^{2} (218.31 sq mi)	570.92 km^{2} (220.43 sq mi)	570.70 km^{2} (220.35 sq mi)
Population density	0.3/km^{2} (0.78/sq mi)	0.2/km^{2} (0.52/sq mi)	0.2/km^{2} (0.52/sq mi)
Median age	58.8 (M: 58.8, F: 58.8)	55.4 (M: 58.5, F: 52.8)	46.5 (M: 49.7, F: 44.4)
Private dwellings	197 (total) 61 (occupied)	273 (total) 64 (occupied)	220 (total)
Median household income	$.N/A	$64,384	$.N/A

Notes: Income data for this area has been suppressed for data quality or confidentiality reasons.
2016 and 2021 Population and dwelling figures based on revised counts.
References: 2021 2016 2011

Historical Census Data - Sheenboro, Quebec

Year	Pop.	±%
1976	152	—
1981	129	−15.1%
1986	118	−8.5%
1991	99	−16.1%
1996	127	+28.3%

Year	Pop.	±%
2001	115	−9.4%
2006	167	+45.2%
2011	130	−22.2%
2016	130	+0.0%
2021	126	−3.1%

2016 and 2021 Population figures based on revised counts.
Source: Statistics Canada

=== Language ===
Canada Census Mother Tongue - Sheenboro, Quebec
Census	Total	French			English			French & English			Other		
Year	Responses	Count	Trend	Pop %	Count	Trend	Pop %	Count	Trend	Pop %	Count	Trend	Pop %
2021	150	15	0.0%	10.0%	125	▲4.2%	83.3%	0	0.0%	0.0%	5	0.0%	3.3%
2016	140	15	▲200%	10.7%	120	0.0%	85.7%	0	0.0%	0.0%	5	0.0%	3.6%
2011	130	5	▲ n/a%	3.8%	120	▲25.0%	92.3%	0	0.0%	0.0%	5	▲ n/a%	3.8%
2006	-	-	0.0%	0.0%	-	0.0%	0.0%	-	0.0%	0.0%	-	0.0%	0.0%
2001	0	0	0.0%	0.0%	90	▼18.2%	0.0%	0	0.0%	0.0%	0	▼100.0%	0.0%
1996	125	0	n/a	0.0%	110	n/a	88.0%	0	n/a	0.0%	15	n/a	12.0%
Note: 2006 language data for this area has been suppressed for data quality or confidentiality reasons.

== Attractions ==
Oiseau Rock
Oiseau Rock is a 150 metres (490 ft) high rock cliff rising from the Ottawa River. It is a historic and sacred site of the Anishinaabe, who used to make tobacco offerings there and paint pictographs, such as images of canoes, arrowheads, fish, serpents, and thunderbirds. Despite damage from graffiti, the many pictographs there are considered to be "the most important and prominent rock-art site in Quebec." The rock has been an attraction since the time when steamboats were the main mode of transportation on the Ottawa River, stopping by the rock to blow the whistle and listen to the echo. Today there is a hiking trail to the top of the rock, providing several lookouts on the way.

Fort William/Hotel Pontiac
Located at a sandy beach on the Ottawa River, the hotel was originally founded in 1823 as a fur trade post by the HBC. In 1869, it was sold to James McCool, who built the Hotel Pontiac in 1896. At one time, it had 60 rooms, hosting guests arriving by steamboat, including silent-film actress Mary Pickford. The hotel offers cabin accommodations and serves meals to beach-goers.

Additionally, Sheenboro is the access point for Zec Saint-Patrice, a wilderness zone for hunting and fishing.

== Government ==
Sheenboro forms part of the federal electoral district of Pontiac—Kitigan Zibi and has been represented by Sophie Chatel of the Liberal Party since 2021. Provincially, Sheenboro is part of the Pontiac electoral district and is represented by André Fortin of the Quebec Liberal Party since 2014.

Sheenboro federal election results
Year	Liberal		Conservative		Bloc Québécois		New Democratic		Green	
2021	41%	27	35%	23	0%	0	18%	11	1%	1
2019	56%	38	23%	15	1%	0	12%	8	5%	4

Sheenboro provincial election results
Year	CAQ		Liberal		QC solidaire		Parti Québécois	
2018	3%	1	89%	40	0%	0	0%	0
2014	2%	1	98%	67	0%	0	0%	0

List of former mayors:

- Roy Perrault (2003–2009)
- Dick Edwards (2009–2013)
- Shamus Morris (2013–2014)
- Doris Ranger (2014–present)

== See also ==
- List of anglophone communities in Quebec
- List of municipalities in Quebec
