= Dumoine River =

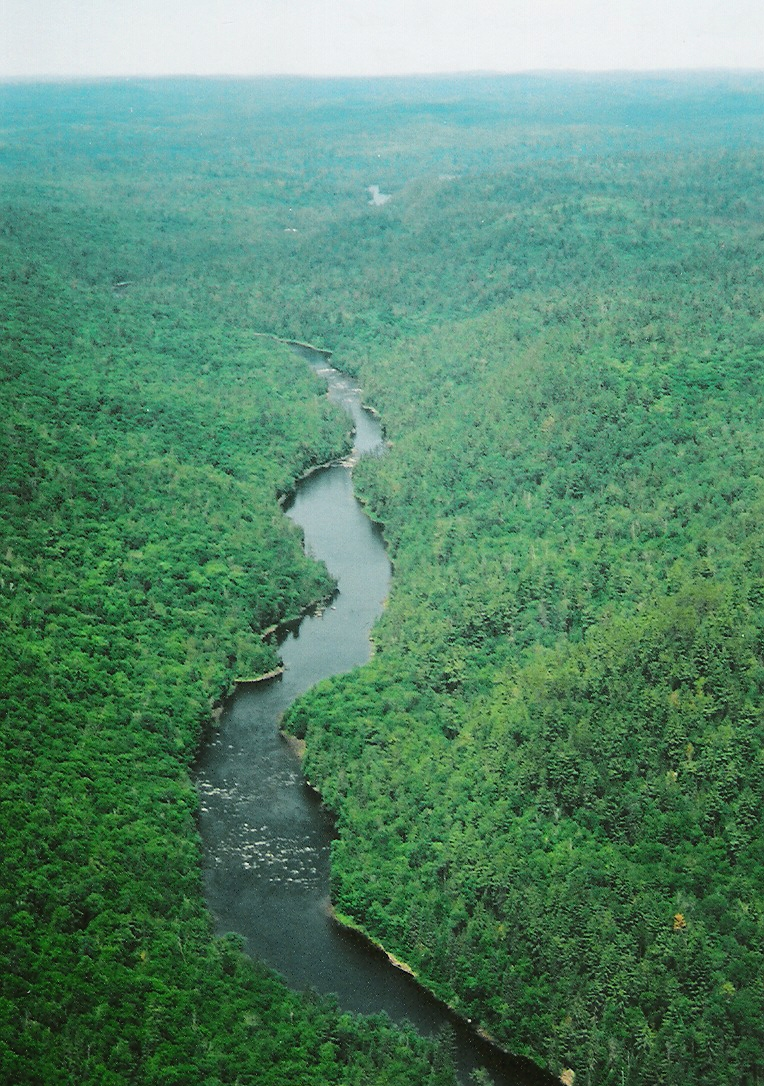
- Dumoine River near river kilometer 55

- Location within Quebec
- Native name: Rivière Dumoine (French)

Location
- Country: Canada
- Province: Quebec
- Regions: Outaouais; Abitibi-Témiscamingue

Physical characteristics
- Source: Machin Lake
  - location: Réservoir-Dozois, Quebec
  - coordinates: 47°16′19″N 77°53′0″W
- Mouth: Ottawa River
  - location: west of Rapides-des-Joachims
  - coordinates: 46°12′55″N 77°50′57″W
- Length: 129 km (80 mi)
- Basin size: 5,380 km^{2} (2,080 sq mi)

Basin features
- Progression: Ottawa River→ St. Lawrence River→ Gulf of St. Lawrence
- River system: Ottawa River drainage basin

The Dumoine River is a river in western Quebec with its source in Machin Lake near La Vérendrye Wildlife Reserve. From Dumoine Lake, the river flows almost due south off the Canadian Shield and empties into the Ottawa River, just west of Rapides-des-Joachims, Quebec, or Rolphton, Ontario. The river is 129 kilometres (80 mi) long and drains a watershed of 5,380 square kilometres (2,080 mi^{2}). This relatively short river compared to its drainage area indicates that the Dumoine has a strong current and many steep-gradient rapids.

Primarily known today for its white water canoeing and fishing, the river has a rich history from the native Indian era to exploration, fur trading, and logging. Development is minimal along the river. Occasionally the river is crossed by logging roads but between river kilometres 20 and 30 are several cottages.

This river is often grouped together with the Noire and Coulonge Rivers as three of a kind. All three are in the same area, have similar characteristics, and are very popular with whitewater canoers.

The river is named after the French family of Le Moynes.

For almost its entire length, the Dumoine River forms the boundary between the Pontiac and Témiscamingue regional county municipalities.

== History ==
The Algonquins named it Cakawitopikak Sipi and Ekonakwasi Sipi which means Alder River (for its many alders that line the river on both sides) and Desire River respectively. A 1755 map by Jacques-Nicolas Bellin shows the name Acounagousin River. Lotter, in 1762, and Carver, in 1776, named it likewise and they identify Lake Caouinagamic as its source.

The indigenous people, coming from the Great Lakes via the French and Mattawa Rivers, used the Dumoine as an alternate northern route to reach trading partners in the Mauricie, Quebec City and Atlantic regions. From portage to portage between the lakes and rivers, they would reach Lake "Caouinagamic" (probably modern-day Obedjiwan, which in turn became subsumed in the Gouin Reservoir), the source of the Saint-Maurice River, which would lead them in turn down to Trois Rivières on the St. Lawrence River, thereby avoiding the Outaouais region and Montreal, which were subject to raids by the Iroquois.

In 1762, Alexander Henry the elder passed by the mouth of the Dumoine when travelling to Sault Ste. Marie. He wrote: "at the mouth of the Du Moine River, there is another fort or trading post where I found a small camp of Maskegon Indians with whom I have traded many items for fur."

The 1801 map of Alexander Mackenzie shows the layout of the Dumoine River but not all the way to its source. It is named after the trading post built at the river's mouth towards the end of French rule. The post was abandoned in 1761, and Fort Dumoine took over its activities around 1785. But after 1800 this fort no longer gave any signs of life.

On May 14, 2008, the Quebec Minister of Sustainable Development, Environment and Parks announced interim protection for 1,445 square kilometres (558 sq mi) of the Dumoine River watershed. No industrial activities are allowed in the new interim protected area covering almost a third of the watershed and encompassed the Dumoine River from its head water to the Ottawa River.

== Paddling ==
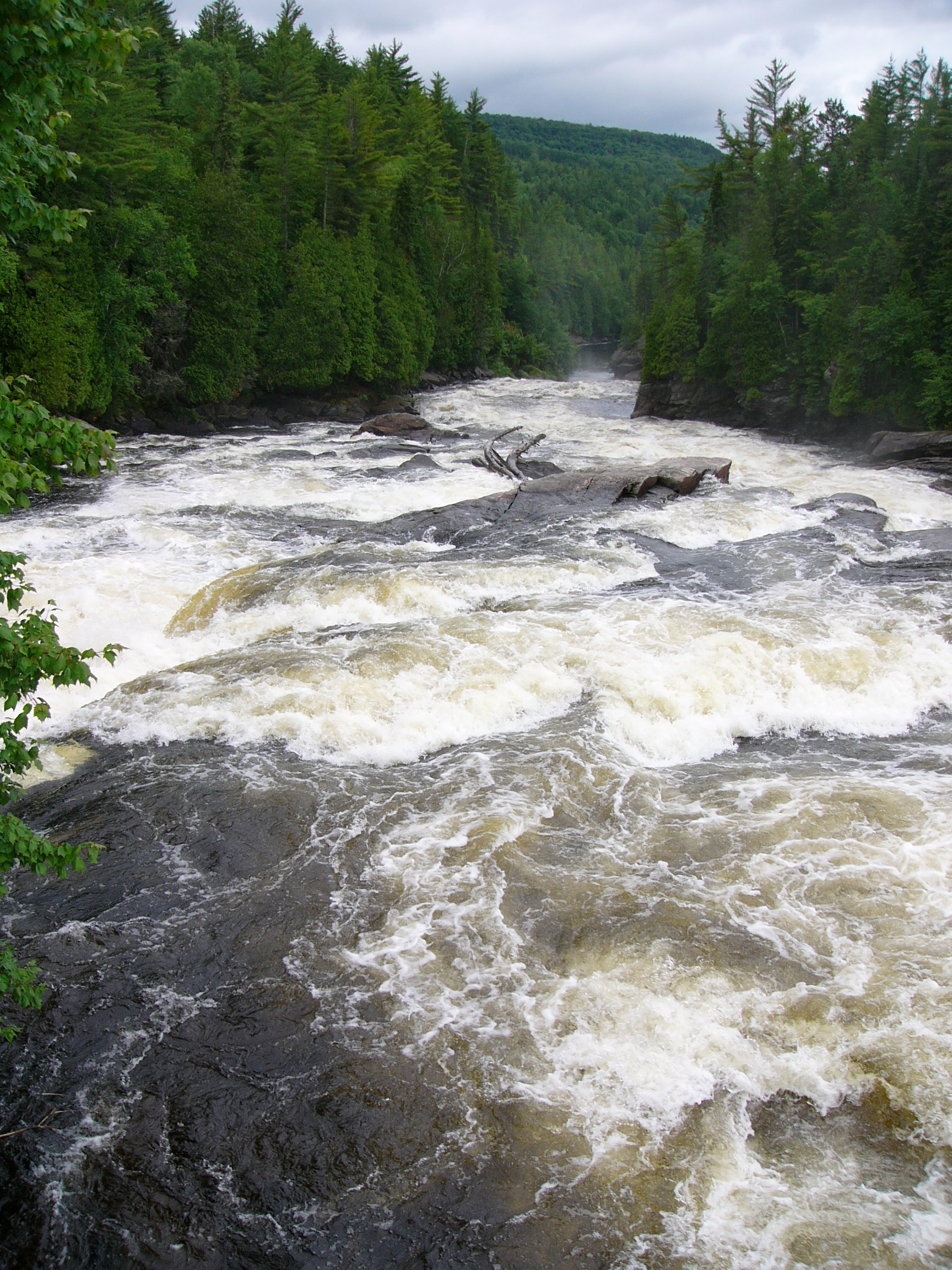
View down Grand Chute

Paddling down the Dumoine is considered exciting and rewarding by canoeists because of the large number of runnable rapids and its fast, reliable current. Trips usually start at Lac Dumoine or via the North River from Ten Mile Lake, paddling 100 kilometres (62 mi) in about 5 to 7 days; Lac Laforge, covering 75 kilometres (47 mi) in 4 days, or Lac Benoit, running 60 kilometres (37 mi) in about 3 to 4 days. Access is by floatplane or logging road.

The range of rapids is large, from uncomplicated swifts to un-runnable falls. Beginning from Lac Dumoine, some of the more notable rapids are:

- km 64, "Fish Portage" (also called "Triple Play") - 3 sets of falls with approaches rated Class 1 and 2 on the International Scale of River Difficulty.
- km 58, "Canoe Eater" - an interesting technical-Class 2 boulder run
- km 55, "Log Jam"
- km 54, "Little Steel"
- km 44, "Big Steel" - Class 3 to 2
- km 23, "Grande Chute" - impressive chute (not canoeable) followed by a Class 1 rapid
- km 17, "Red Pine" - series of rapids ranging from Class 1 to 3
- km 13, "Examination"

The section between Lac Benoit and Little Steel Falls (kilometres 60 to 50) is particularly engaging, featuring many Class 2-3 drop-and-pool rapids typical of Canadian Shield rivers.

The final waterfall, called Ryan's Chute, connects to the Ottawa River. This dangerous chute once had 35 pairs of hobnail boots nailed to surrounding trees as memorials to the loggers who had drowned there.

All rapids and falls have well maintained portages. However, some minor CAT1 rapids lack portages, and spotters are recommended to access portages around several falls because of close proximity to dangerous waters.

The Quebec shore of the Ottawa River at the end of the Dumoine River is undeveloped. For take-out, it requires either crossing the Ottawa River (2.5 km wide at this point) to Ontario's Driftwood Provincial Park, or paddling 12 kilometres (7 mi) downstream to Rapides-des-Joachims, Quebec. Regardless, the Ottawa River is often very windy with stiff headwinds, and large waves that require caution.

== See also ==
- La Vérendrye Wildlife Reserve
- Zec Dumoine
- Ottawa River
