= Les Lacs-du-Témiscamingue =

- Unorganized territory
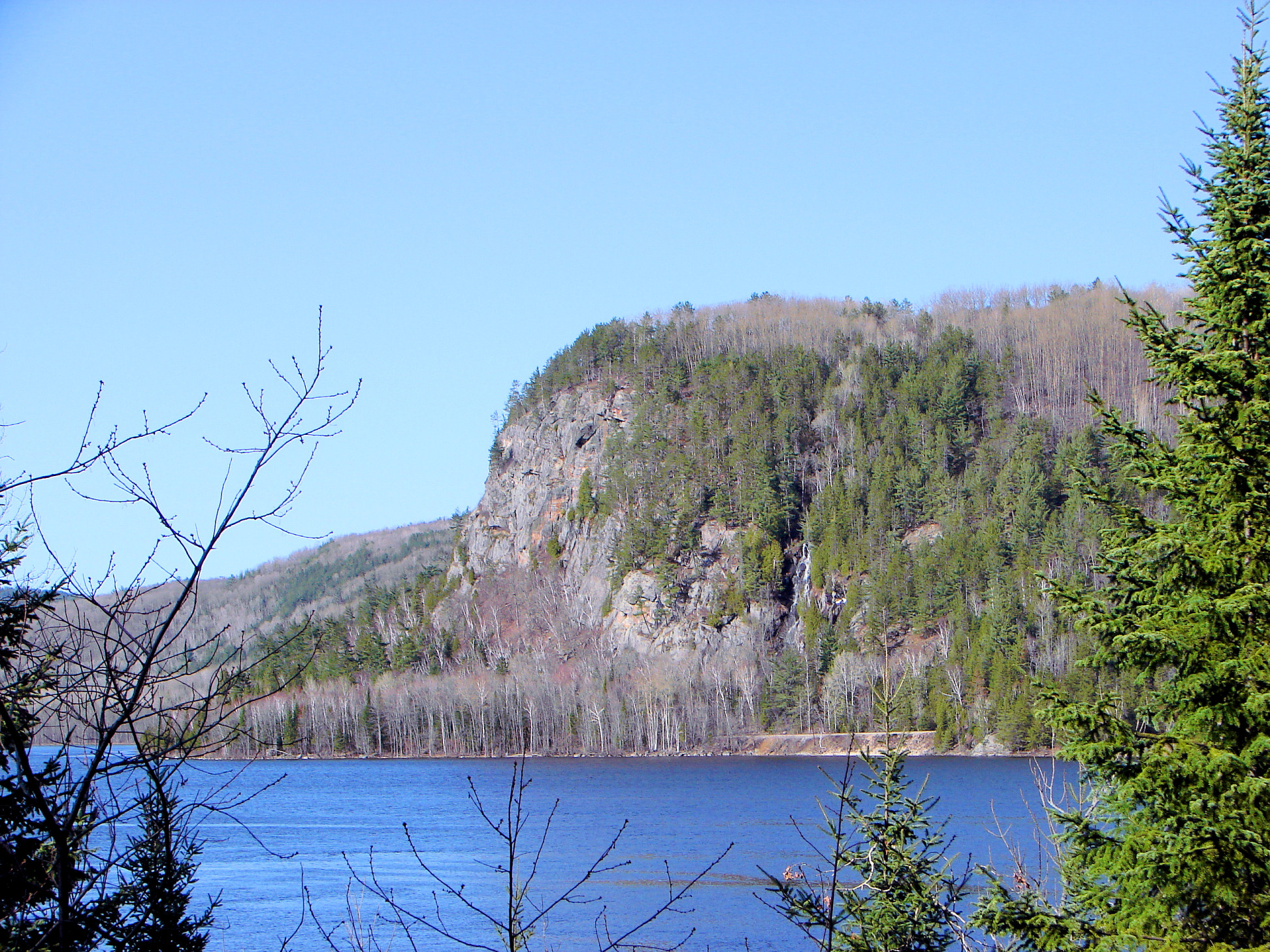
- Lacs-du-Témiscamingue as seen across the Ottawa River near Mattawa

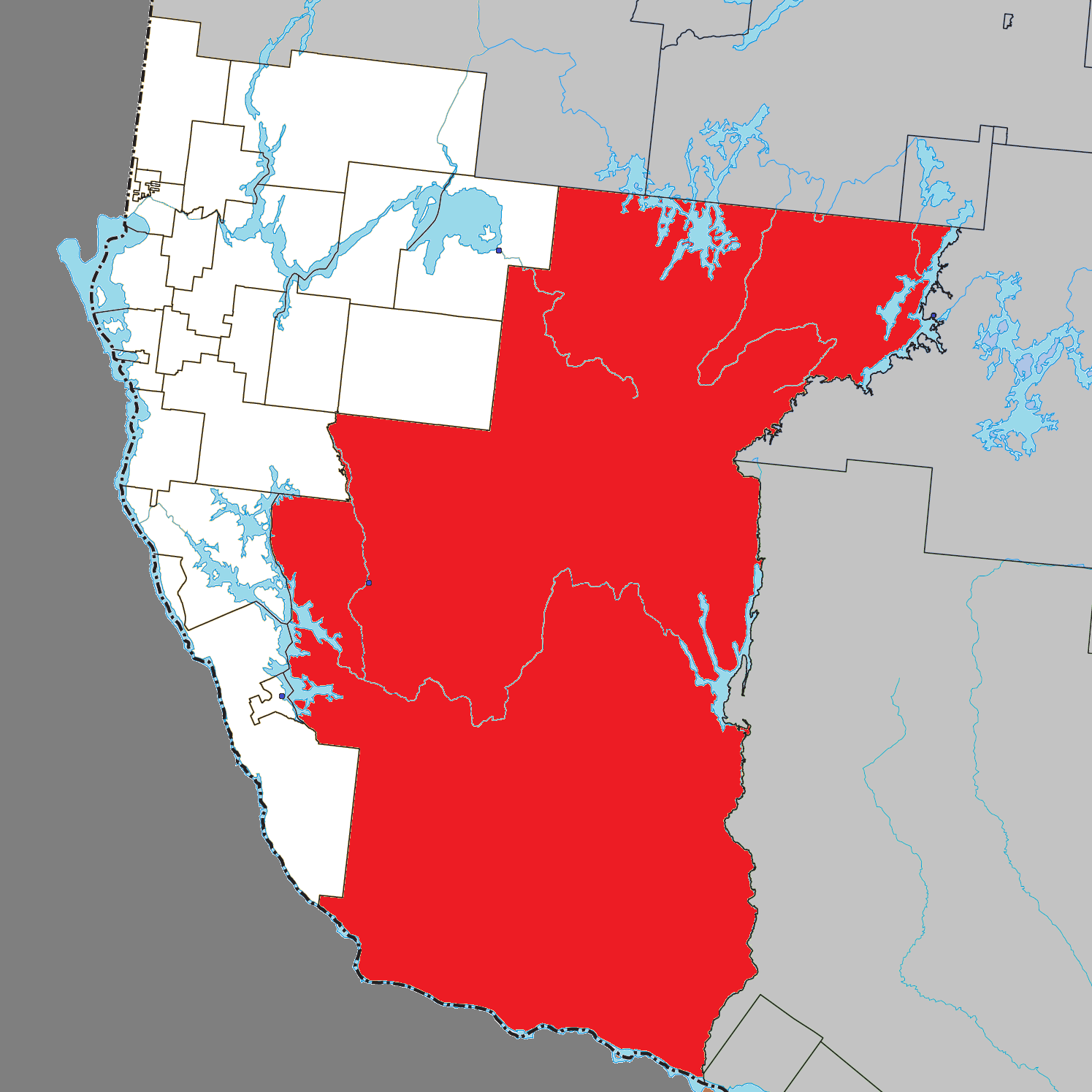
- Location within Témiscamingue RCM

- Location in western Quebec
- Coordinates: 47°04′N 78°26′W
- Country: Canada
- Province: Quebec
- Region: Abitibi-Témiscamingue
- RCM: Témiscamingue
- Constituted: October 31, 2005

Government
  - Federal riding: Abitibi—Témiscamingue
  - Prov. riding: Rouyn-Noranda–Témiscamingue

Area
  - Total: 12,224.27 km^{2} (4,719.82 sq mi)
  - Land: 10,366.89 km^{2} (4,002.68 sq mi)

Population (2021)
  - Total: 10
  - Density: 0/km^{2} (0/sq mi)
  - Pop (2016–21): ▼33.3%
  - Dwellings: 15
- Time zone: UTC−05:00 (EST)
  - Summer (DST): UTC−04:00 (EDT)

Les Lacs-du-Témiscamingue (French pronunciation: [le lak dy temiskamɛ̃ɡ], lit. 'The Lakes of Temiscaming') is a large unorganized territory in the Abitibi-Témiscamingue region of Quebec, Canada. With a total area of 12,224.27 square kilometres (4,719.82 sq mi), it takes up over 60% of the eastern portion of the Témiscamingue Regional County Municipality.

The only community in the territory is the hamlet of Lac-Caugnawana (46°32′06″N 78°18′23″W).

Until October 31, 2005, Les Lacs-du-Témiscamingue and Laniel unorganized territories were part of the Rivière-Kipawa unorganized territory.

== Demographics ==
Canada census – Les Lacs-du-Témiscamingue community profile

	2021	2016
Population	10 (-33.3% from 2016)	15 (--% from 2011)
Land area	10,366.89 km^{2} (4,002.68 sq mi)	10,418.36 km^{2} (4,022.55 sq mi)
Population density	0.0/km^{2} (0/sq mi)	0.0/km^{2} (0/sq mi)
Median age
Private dwellings	15 (total) 6 (occupied)	20 (total) 5 (occupied)
Median household income

Notes: Median ages and incomes suppressed.
References: 2021 2016

Historical census populations – Les Lacs-du-Témiscamingue
Year	Pop.	±%
2001	0	—
2006	5	—
2011	0	−100.0%
2016	15	—
2021	10	−33.3%
2001 population figure adjusted due to boundary change. Source: Statistics Canada

== See also ==
- List of unorganized territories in Quebec
