= Rapides-des-Joachims =

- Municipality
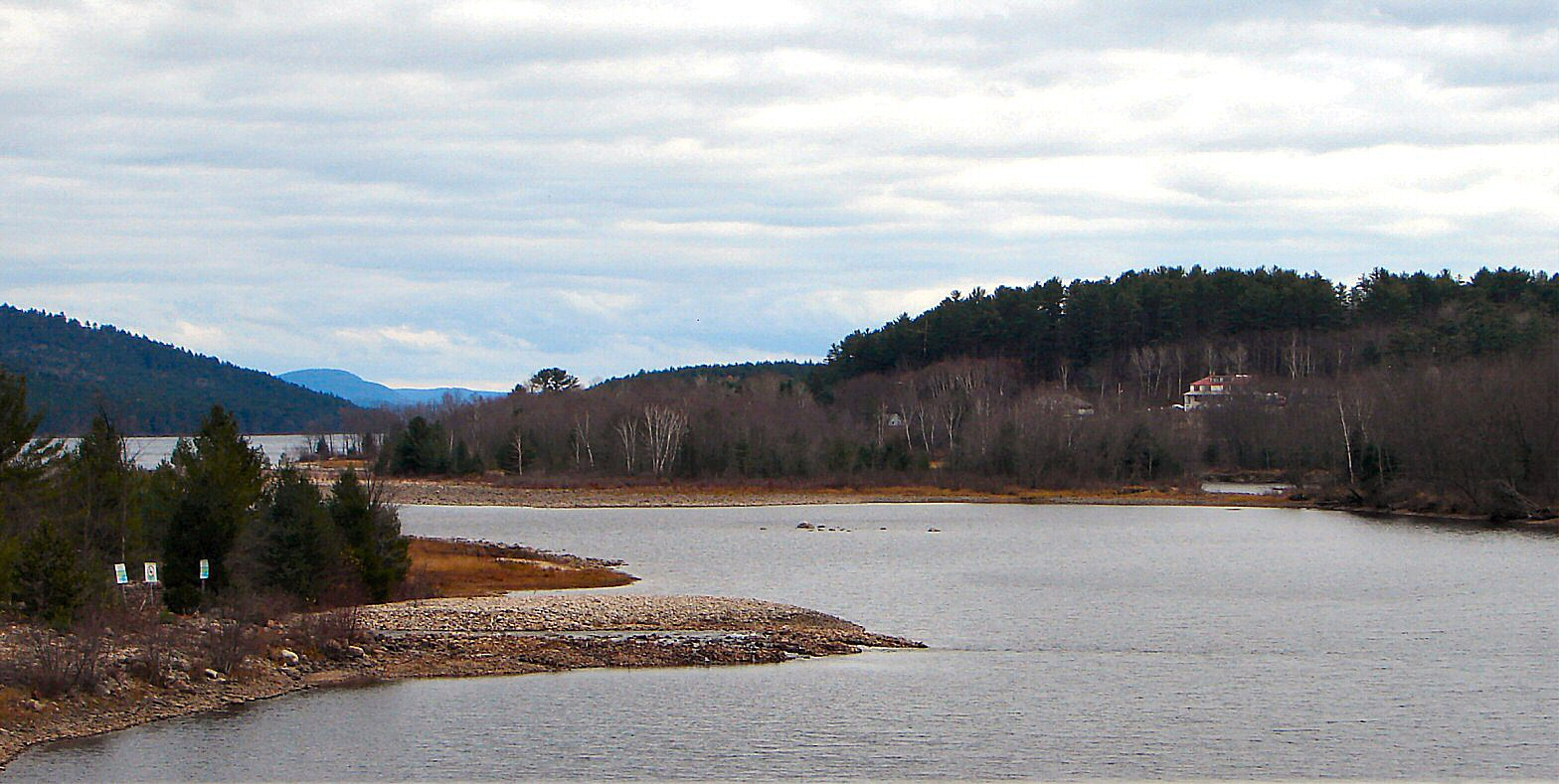
- Nicknames: Swisha, The Swisha
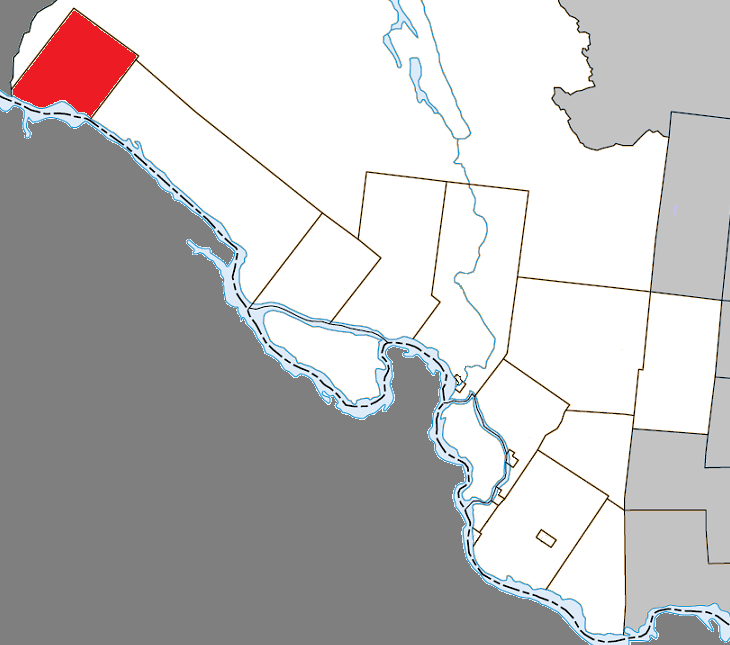
- Location within Pontiac RCM

- Location in western Quebec
- Coordinates: 46°12′N 77°41′W
- Country: Canada
- Province: Quebec
- Region: Outaouais
- RCM: Pontiac
- Settled: 17th century
- Constituted: January 1, 1955

Government
  - Mayor: Doug Rousselle
  - Federal riding: Pontiac—Kitigan Zibi
  - Prov. riding: Pontiac

Area
  - Total: 257.36 km^{2} (99.37 sq mi)
  - Land: 238.90 km^{2} (92.24 sq mi)

Population (2021)
  - Total: 141
  - Density: 0.6/km^{2} (1.6/sq mi)
  - Pop (2016-21): ▼9.6%
  - Dwellings: 117
- Time zone: UTC−5 (EST)
  - Summer (DST): UTC−4 (EDT)
- Postal code(s): J0X 3M0
- Area code: 613
- Highways: No major routes
- Website: www.rapidesdesjoachims.ca

Rapides-des-Joachims is a municipality and village in western Quebec, Canada, part of Pontiac County in the Outaouais region. The village is situated on Rapides-des-Joachims Island (l'île de Rapides-des-Joachims) on the Ottawa River, about 100 km northwest of Fort-Coulonge. It is also known as Swisha.

Rapides-des-Joachims is isolated from the rest of Quebec's road network because the only paved road link to the village is through Rolphton, Ontario, although an unpaved trail exists between the village and Témiscaming. It is the only community on the Quebec side of the Ottawa River between Sheenboro and Témiscaming. Because it is also isolated from Quebec's telecommunications network, the community is part of Rolphton's telephone exchange area, and is consequently served by Ontario's area code 613 rather than Quebec's area code 819.

== History ==
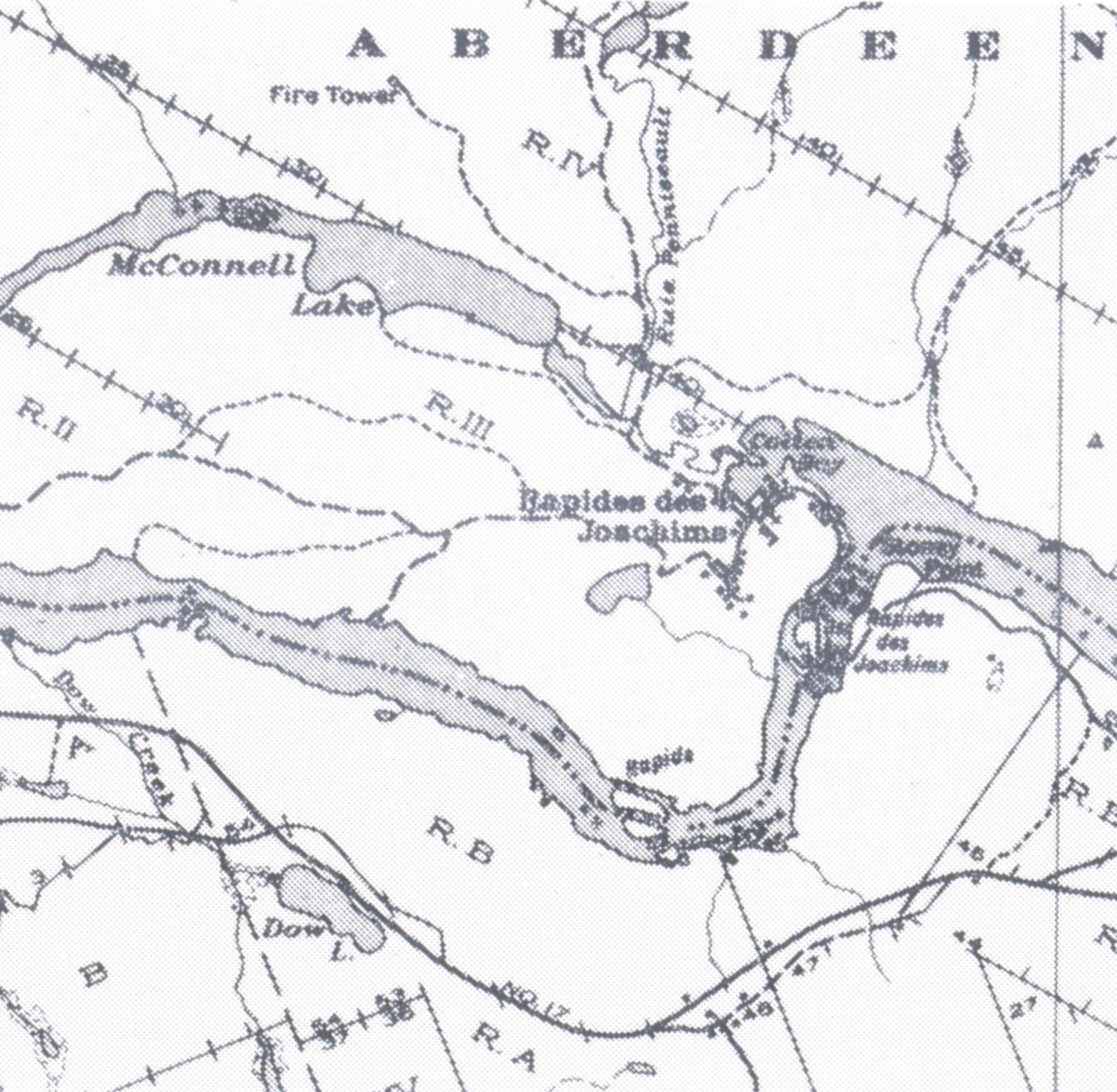
Rapides-des-Joachims before construction of the dam. The Ontario/Quebec border is represented as a dashed line on the Ottawa River.

The site had long been inhabited by the indigenous people before Europeans arrived. The explorers and voyageurs of the seventeenth and eighteenth centuries would travel on the Ottawa River to the west and at the foot of the rapids, they would have established a resting place and may have given it the name of an explorer.

It was a busy place during the seventeenth century, when a mission post was set up along the river where a Hudson's Bay Company trading post had been established at the foot of the "Long Rapids", as they were called at the time.

But the place was called Rapides des Joachims de l'Estang in a memorandum of 1686 by Jacques-René de Brisay, Governor of New France, to Marquis de Seignelay, and named Portage de Joachim de l'Estan on a map of Franquelin of 1688. Another document from 1699 shows Joachim de l'Estang. The Joachims are sons of Michel Mathieu Brunet dit Lestang, colonist who arrived in New France on 20 August 1657.

However, both in Quebec and in Ontario, the name Swisha, Sweshaw, or Shesha Rapids has also long been used for this location as a map of 1790 indicates. Swisha is an obvious distortion of the French pronunciation of "Joachim".

In 1863, Stanislas Drapeau described Rapides des Joachims and Rapides des Deux Joachims as "the most important place for navigation on the Ottawa River and flourished thanks to the logging industry."

By 1871 it had become a small village complete with a telegraph office of the Montreal Telegraph Company. The river steamers had to stop here because it was the head of navigation on the Ottawa River. In 1886 the Oblate Fathers built a frame church in the village, which was used until 1922, when a new church was built.

In 1948, the construction of a dam and hydro-electric station began and the rapids which gave the town its name disappeared.

The municipality was incorporated in 1955 when it was formed out of the Sheen-Esher-Aberdeen-Malakoff United Townships. It adopted its present name of Rapides-des-Joachims, which had already been assigned to the post office created about 100 years earlier in 1853. Its first mayor was J.H. Madore. Subsequently in 1960, the territory of the former Aberdeen Township was added to the municipality.

== Geography ==
The municipality covers a vast sparsely populated area characterized by boreal forest, lakes, and streams. Prior to the construction of a hydro-electric dam in 1950, the village's site was not an island. The rising water flooded the old river bed from the north through Lake McConnell. The dam can be bypassed on one of the Ottawa Navigable Waterway bypasses, connecting the Pembroke stretch of the Ottawa River to the upstream section to Mattawa.

=== Climate ===
Rapides-des-Joachims has a humid continental climate with four distinct seasons. Summers are warm to hot, with significant rainfall. Winters are cold for its low latitude, with significant snowfall.

Climate data for Rapides-des-Joachims
Month	Jan	Feb	Mar	Apr	May	Jun	Jul	Aug	Sep	Oct	Nov	Dec	Year
Record high °C (°F)	8.0 (46.4)	15.0 (59.0)	21.0 (69.8)	31.0 (87.8)	38.9 (102.0)	36.0 (96.8)	39.0 (102.2)	37.5 (99.5)	34.5 (94.1)	28.0 (82.4)	18.3 (64.9)	13.5 (56.3)	39.0 (102.2)
Mean daily maximum °C (°F)	−6.7 (19.9)	−3.4 (25.9)	3.0 (37.4)	11.1 (52.0)	19.2 (66.6)	24.0 (75.2)	26.3 (79.3)	24.9 (76.8)	19.6 (67.3)	12.0 (53.6)	4.0 (39.2)	−3 (27)	10.9 (51.6)
Daily mean °C (°F)	−12.1 (10.2)	−9.7 (14.5)	−3.3 (26.1)	4.9 (40.8)	12.3 (54.1)	17.3 (63.1)	19.8 (67.6)	18.7 (65.7)	14.0 (57.2)	7.3 (45.1)	−0.1 (31.8)	−7.5 (18.5)	5.1 (41.2)
Mean daily minimum °C (°F)	−17.6 (0.3)	−16.0 (3.2)	−9.6 (14.7)	−1.3 (29.7)	5.4 (41.7)	10.5 (50.9)	13.3 (55.9)	12.4 (54.3)	8.4 (47.1)	2.4 (36.3)	−3.7 (25.3)	−12 (10)	−0.6 (30.9)
Record low °C (°F)	−40.0 (−40.0)	−37 (−35)	−37 (−35)	−19.0 (−2.2)	−8 (18)	−2 (28)	3.5 (38.3)	0.0 (32.0)	−3.0 (26.6)	−11.1 (12.0)	−27.2 (−17.0)	−35.5 (−31.9)	−40 (−40)
Average precipitation mm (inches)	60.9 (2.40)	52.5 (2.07)	56.7 (2.23)	60.8 (2.39)	83.7 (3.30)	89.0 (3.50)	83.7 (3.30)	89.9 (3.54)	86.6 (3.41)	87.0 (3.43)	77.4 (3.05)	66.6 (2.62)	894.7 (35.22)
Source: Environment Canada

== Demographics ==
=== Population ===
Canada census – Rapides-des-Joachims community profile

	2021	2016	2011
Population	141 (-9.6% from 2016)	156 (-6.6% from 2011)	167 (% from 2006)
Land area	238.90 km^{2} (92.24 sq mi)	242.81 km^{2} (93.75 sq mi)	242.86 km^{2} (93.77 sq mi)
Population density	0.6/km^{2} (1.6/sq mi)	0.6/km^{2} (1.6/sq mi)	0.5/km^{2} (1.3/sq mi)
Median age	56.0 (M: 58.0, F: 54.8)	51.7 (M: 52.8, F: 50.2)	47.8 (M: 49.5, F: 45.8)
Private dwellings	117 (total)	124 (total)	96 (total)
Median household income	$.N/A	$44,928	$.N/A

Notes: Income data for this area has been suppressed for data quality or confidentiality reasons. 2011 population amended.
References: 2021 2016 2011

Historical Census Data - Rapides-des-Joachims, Quebec

Year	Pop.	±%
1976	205	—
1981	192	−6.3%
1986	176	−8.3%
1991	183	+4.0%
1996	185	+1.1%

Year	Pop.	±%
2001	197	+6.5%
2006	172	−12.7%
2011	167	−2.9%
2016	156	−6.6%
2021	141	−9.6%

Source: Statistics Canada

=== Language ===
Canada Census Mother Tongue - Rapides-des-Joachims, Quebec
Census	Total	French			English			French & English			Other		
Year	Responses	Count	Trend	Pop %	Count	Trend	Pop %	Count	Trend	Pop %	Count	Trend	Pop %
2016	160	55	0.0%	34.4%	105	▲23.8%	65.6%	0	0.0%	0.0%	0	▼100%	0.0%
2011	135	55	▼21.4%	40.7%	80	▼20.0%	59.3%	0	0.0%	0.0%	5	▲ n/a%	0.0%
2006	170	70	▲14.3%	41.2%	100	▼25.9%	58.8%	0	0.0%	0.0%	0	0.0%	0.0%
2001	195	60	0.0%	30.8%	135	▲3.7%	69.2%	0	▼100.0%	0.0%	0	0.0%	0.0%
1996	200	60	n/a	30.0%	130	n/a	65.0%	10	n/a	5.0%	0	n/a	0.0%

== Economy ==
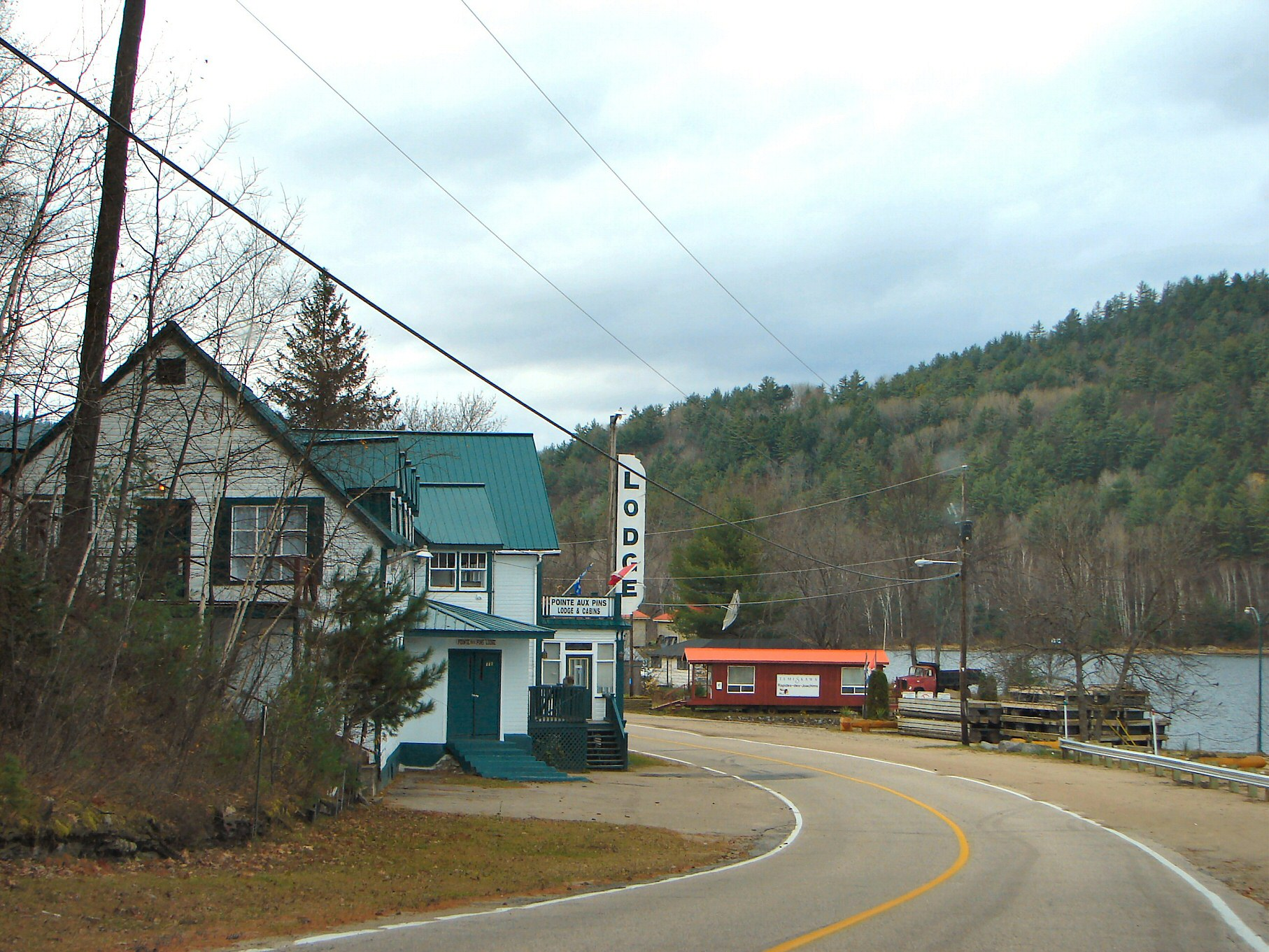
Rue Principale (Main street)

Since Rapides-des-Joachims provides access to vast tracts of wilderness, including ZEC Dumoine, it depends largely on the hunting and fishing business. It is the long-time base of a charter float plane company (Air Swisha, formerly Bradley Air Service/First Air), operating a de Havilland Canada DHC-2 Beaver.

The economy depends also on logging and the Commonwealth Plywood Mill.

== Local government ==
List of former mayors:

- Jean-Paul Dupuy (1987-1989 & 1993-1997)
- Gérald Dagg (... –2005)
- Dale Lévesque (2005–2009)
- James Gibson (2009–2021)
- Doug Rousselle (2021–present)

== See also ==
- List of anglophone communities in Quebec
- List of municipalities in Quebec
