= National parks of Quebec =

Protected areas created by the provincial government of Quebec

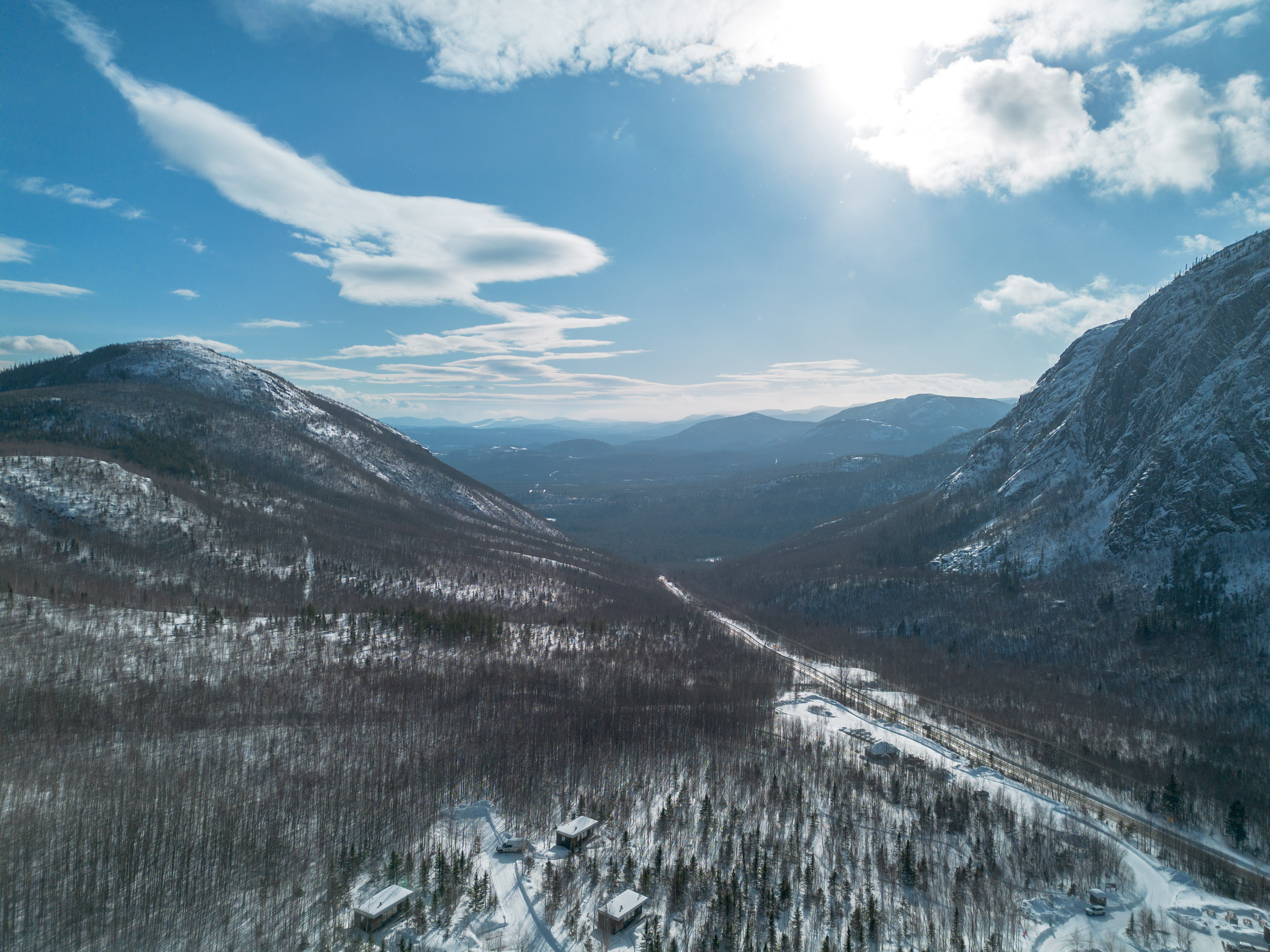
National parks of Quebec; Parcs nationaux du Québec (French)
Grands-Jardins National Park in Charlevoix, Quebec
First park	Mont-Tremblant National Park, 1895
Smallest park	Miguasha National Park, 0.62 km^{2}
Largest park	Tursujuq National Park, 26,121 km^{2}
Number of parks	28
Total area	42,765.57 km^{2}
Governing bodies	Société des établissements de plein air du Québec; Nunavik Parks

The national parks of Quebec, Canada, are provincial parks created by the government of Quebec to protect territories representative of natural regions of the province or sites of exceptional character, while making them accessible to the public for education and/or recreation. As of 2023, there are 28 such parks in Quebec, which protect an area of 42,765.57 square kilometres (16,511.88 sq mi), or about 2.8% of the territory of the province. All but four parks are administered by the Société des établissements de plein air du Québec (Sépaq). Those four are administered by Nunavik Parks. In addition, Sépaq jointly administers a National Marine Conservation Area with Parks Canada as part of the country's national park system.

Despite the name "national park", the parks on this list are provincial parks, and are not part of Canada's national park system.

== History ==
The first provincial park in Quebec was created on January 12, 1895: Parc de la Montagne-Tremblante was the third provincial park in the country, after Algonquin and Rondeau, both in Ontario, created in 1893 and 1894, respectively.

In order to reinforce the protection in its parks and to respect the criteria of the International Union for Conservation of Nature for protected areas, the government legislated in 1977 with the Parks Act. This divided the parks into two categories: conservation parks, favouring the protection of the natural territory, and recreation parks, which allowed the installation of intensive recreation equipment.

It was from 1999 that the Société des établissements de plein air du Québec (Sépaq) was given the mandate to manage all the parks in Quebec. In 2001, the government changed the status of recreation and conservation parks to one status, that of national parks. The official purpose of the change was to strengthen the conservation component of parks, but it was also a political expression of aspiring Quebec nationalism (see Québécois nation motion. The name change resulted, and continues to result, in confusion for the public.

== Area ==
The size of Quebec's national parks varies depending on whether they are located in southern Quebec, which is densely populated, or in northern Quebec, which is very sparsely populated. Parks in southern Quebec are generally smaller than northern ones.

1. 0 at 100 square kilometres (39 sq mi): 11 parks
2. 100 at 500 square kilometres (190 sq mi): 8 parks
3. 500 at 1,000 square kilometres (390 sq mi): 3 parks
4. 1000 at 10,000 square kilometres (3,900 sq mi): 3 parks
5. 10,000 square kilometres (3,900 sq mi) and more: 1 park

== Zoning ==
To meet the conservation objective, a zoning system has been put in place. One of the functions of zoning is to distinguish areas of great fragility and those with good support capacity. The zonings are:

1. Reception and service area
2. Ambience zone
3. Preservation area
4. Extreme preservation area

The 'welcome and service area' is, as the name suggests, usually where visitors enter the park. Restrictions on development are less severe than in other areas. This is why there is reception, campsites with services, play areas, sanitary blocks.

The "ambience zone" is the region of a park where it is possible to practice sports which allow the discovery of nature while having a low impact on the environment, such as hiking or snowshoeing. Generally, the facilities are smaller than in the service area.

The 'preservation zone' has a limited support and regeneration capacity and often shelters particular, rare or fragile plant and animal species. The use of the territory is reduced and strongly supervised. Apart from a belvedere, the amenities are non-existent.

The preservation zone 'extreme' is prohibited to all traffic and development. To get there, you must have an authorization from the park director and have a scientific purpose. There are often rare species there that are sensitive to disturbance.

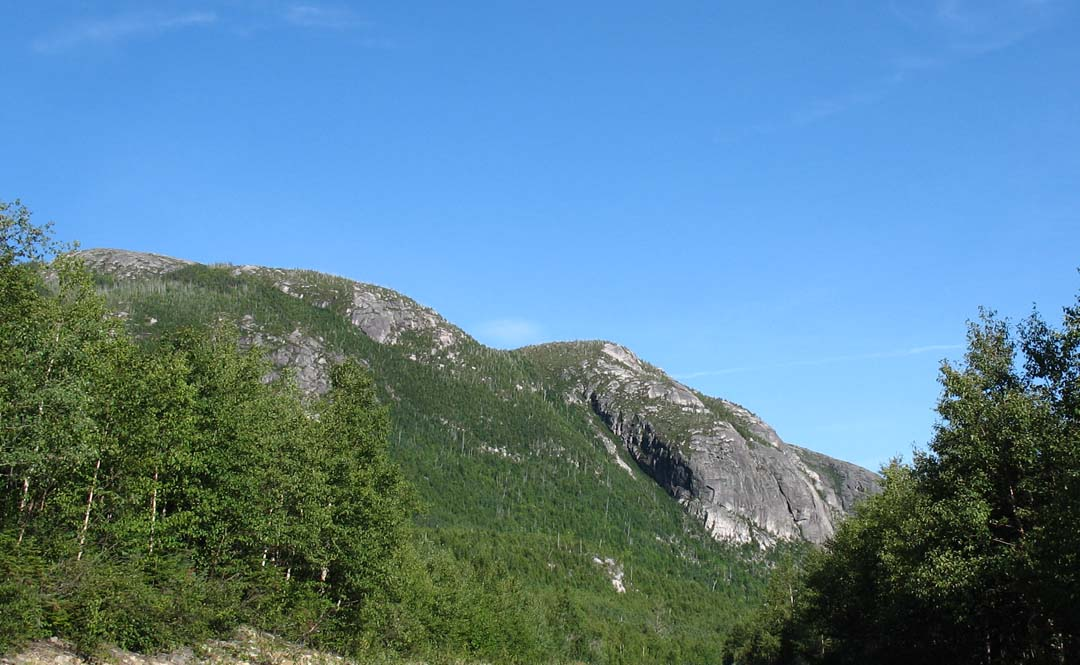
Grands-Jardins National Park in Charlevoix

The protection of certain fragile or exceptional ecosystems is done through strict regulations. Logging, mining, petroleum and energy exploitation as well as hunting and trapping are strictly prohibited. On the other hand, the practice of outdoor sports such as mountain walking, snowshoeing, canoeing or biking are accepted and fall within the mandate of discovering the parks. Several other natural environment interpretation activities are offered and the many naturalist guides present are there to answer your questions. Since 1999, the management of the activities and services of these environments has been entrusted to the Société des établissements de plein air du Québec (SÉPAQ). In addition, the parks north of the 55th parallel are managed by the Kativik Regional Government.

In 2001, Quebec's parks became national parks. The designation 'national' indicates that the parks comply with standards established by the International Union for Conservation of Nature (IUCN). According to IUCN, a national park is a protected area managed primarily for the protection of ecosystem and for recreational purposes.

== List of national parks in Quebec ==
UNESCO World Heritage Site (or part thereof)
Park that is part of a biosphere reserve

National park	Image	Area km²	Constitution	MRC	Manager
Aiguebelle		268.30	1985	Abitibi-Ouest Regional County Municipality and Rouyn-Noranda	Sépaq
Anticosti		571.80	2001	Minganie Regional County Municipality	Sépaq
Bic		33.20	1984	Rimouski-Neigette Regional County Municipality	Sépaq
Fjord-du-Saguenay		326.70	1983	Charlevoix-Est Regional County Municipality, La Haute-Côte-Nord Regional County Municipality and Le Fjord-du-Saguenay Regional County Municipality	Sépaq
Frontenac		156.50	1987	Le Granit Regional County Municipality and Les Appalaches Regional County Municipality	Sépaq
Gaspésie		802.00	1981	La Haute-Gaspésie Regional County Municipality and Matane Regional County Municipality	Sépaq
Grands-Jardins		318.90	1981	Charlevoix Regional County Municipality	Sépaq
Hautes-Gorges-de-la-Rivière-Malbaie		224.90	2000	Charlevoix Regional County Municipality and Charlevoix-Est Regional County Municipality	Sépaq
Île-Bonaventure-et-du-Rocher-Percé		5.80	1985	Le Rocher-Percé Regional County Municipality	Sépaq
Îles-de-Boucherville		8.14	1984	Longueuil	Sépaq
Jacques-Cartier		670.60	1981	La Jacques-Cartier Regional County Municipality and La Côte-de-Beaupré Regional County Municipality	Sépaq
Kuururjuaq		4,460.80	2009	Kativik	Nunavik Parks
Lac-Témiscouata		176.50	2009	Témiscouata Regional County Municipality	Sépaq
Miguasha		0.62	1985	Avignon Regional County Municipality	Sépaq
Mont-Mégantic		59.90	1994	Le Haut-Saint-François Regional County Municipality and Le Granit Regional County Municipality	Sépaq
Mont-Orford		58.37	1979	Memphremagog Regional County Municipality	Sépaq
Mont-Saint-Bruno		8.84	1985	Longueuil	Sépaq
Mont-Tremblant		1,510.10	1981	Antoine-Labelle Regional County Municipality, Les Laurentides Regional County Municipality and Matawinie Regional County Municipality	Sépaq
Monts-Valin		153.60	1996	Le Fjord-du-Saguenay Regional County Municipality	Sépaq
Oka		23.70	1990	Deux-Montagnes Regional County Municipality	Sépaq
Opémican		252.50	2013	Témiscamingue Regional County Municipality	Sépaq
Pingualuit		1,133.90	2004	Kativik	Nunavik Parks
Plaisance		28.10	2002	Papineau Regional County Municipality	Sépaq
Pointe-Taillon		97.50	1985	Lac-Saint-Jean-Est Regional County Municipality	Sépaq
Tursujuq		26,121.00	2013	Kativik	Nunavik Parks
Ulittaniujalik		5,293.00	2016	Kativik	Nunavik Parks
Yamaska		13.40	1983	La Haute-Yamaska Regional County Municipality	Sépaq

== National park reserve ==
In addition to the national parks, the ministry has also designated certain areas as national park reserves. Although they are protected areas, these territories do not have the same legal protection as that of the parks. They are located exclusively in Nord-du-Québec. In other parts of Quebec, the ministry prefers to designate similar areas as biodiversity reserves.

National park reserve	Area km²	Storage	MRC
Assinica	3,193.00	2011	Jamésie
Baie-aux-Feuilles	3,868.10	2008	Kativik
Collines-Ondulées	1,659.50	2008	Kativik
Iluiliq	1,263.00		Kativik
Monts-de-Puvirnituq	3,159.00		Kativik

== National park projects ==
Research will be carried out with a view to acquiring knowledge concerning two other projects in Nunavik, namely:

- from Cape Wolstenholme,
- from Baie-aux-Feuilles.

The creation of two parks is also being considered in boreal forest, in partnership with the Cree. These are national park projects:

- Nibiischii (formerly titled Albanel-Témiscamie-Otish),
- Assinica.

The Ministère de l'Environnement et de la Lutte contre les changements climatiques (Ministry of Sustainable Development, Environment and Parks of Quebec) has also undertaken preliminary studies concerning other national park projects:

- Harrington-Harbour,
- Natashquan-Aguanus-Kenamu.

Public consultations were also held for the expansion of Mont-Orford National Park and Pointe-Taillon National Park.

== See also ==
- Protected areas of Quebec
- List of protected areas of Quebec
- Zone d'exploitation contrôlée (Controlled Harvesting Zone) (ZEC)
