= Povungnituk River =

Rivière de Puvirnituq Puvirnituq River, Rivière de Povungnituk
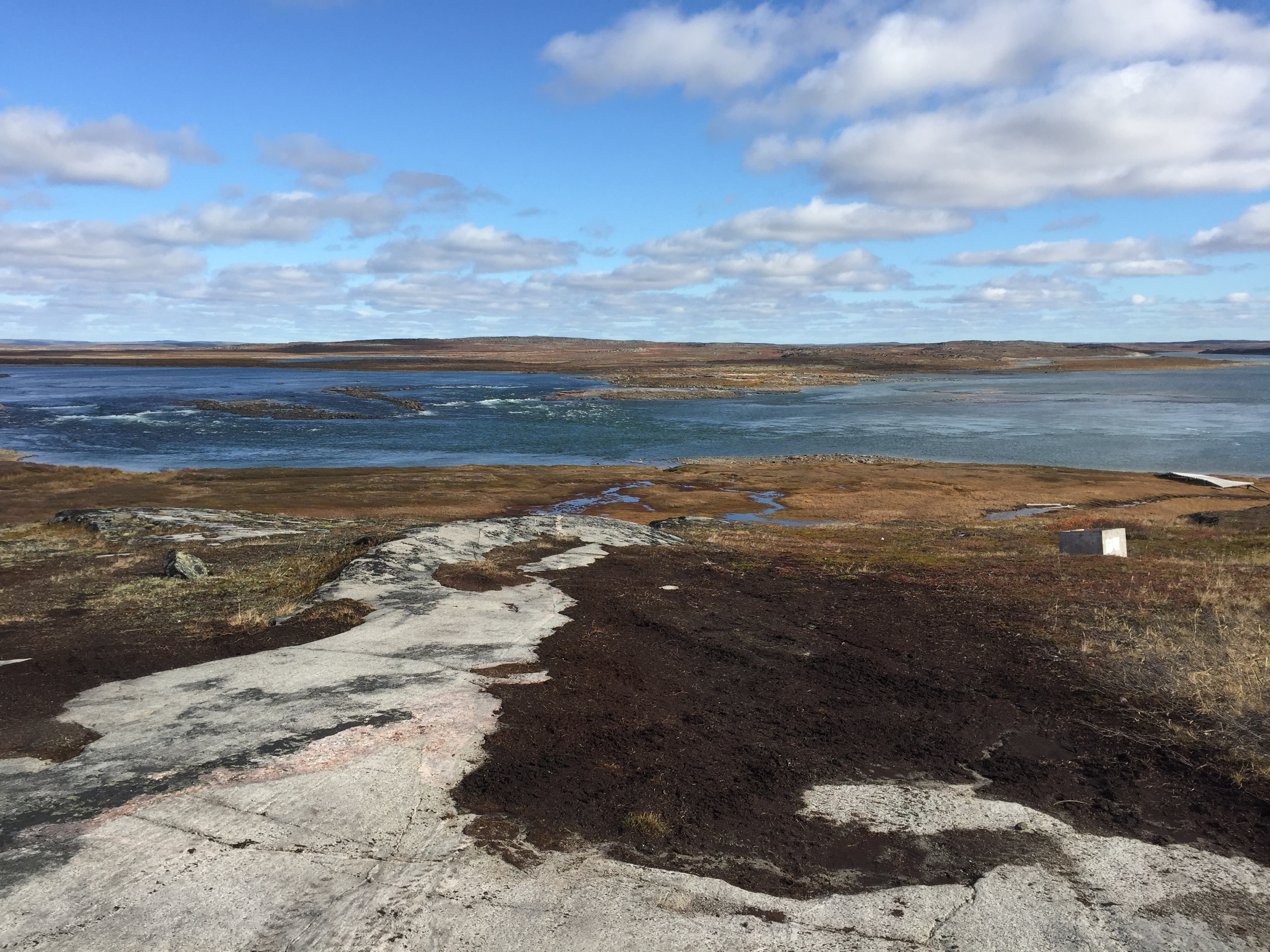
- Puvirnituq River - View from the North bank near the village of Puvirnituq - 2017-09-24

- Location of the mouth of the river in Quebec
- Etymology: From the Inuktitut "smells like rotten meat"
- Native name: Povungnituk (Inuktitut)

Location
- Country: Canada
- Province: Quebec
- Region: Nord-du-Québec
- District: Kativik

Physical characteristics
- Source: Unnamed lake
  - coordinates: 61°43′32″N 73°18′38″W
  - elevation: 588 m (1,929 ft)
- Mouth: Hudson Bay
  - coordinates: 60°01′35″N 77°19′58″W
  - elevation: 0 m (0 ft)
- Length: 389 km (242 mi)
- Basin size: 28,500 km^{2} (11,000 sq mi)
- Discharge
  - average: 480 m^{3}/s (17,000 cu ft/s)

Basin features
- River system: Atlantic Ocean drainage basin

The Rivière de Puvirnituq (English: Puvirnituq River; formerly the Rivière de Povungnituk) is a river in Kativik, Nord-du-Québec, Quebec, Canada. The river flows 389 kilometres (242 mi) from its source at an unnamed lake to Hudson Bay at the village of Puvirnituq. Its watershed encompasses 28,500 square kilometres (11,000 sq mi). The name of the river comes from the Inuktitut "smells like rotten meat." (in syllabics: ᐳᕕᕐᓂᑐᖅ).

The "Povungnituk River" crosses for 40.9 km (25½ miles) from east to west the northern limit of the Pingualuit National Park which is characterized by the Pingualuit crater. This crater is located 16.7 km (10½ miles) south of the "Puvirnituq River".

The surface of the Puvirnituq River is generally frozen annually from October to June (sometimes until July). In the summer, a supply boat moves into the bay for about 4 kilometres (2.5 mi), to the village of Puvirnituq; barges are then used to connect the boat and the dock. Sometimes during the spring flood, ice jams form on the river.

Sport fishing is popular at the foot of the first (about 4 kilometres (2.5 mi)), second (about 7 kilometres (4.3 mi)) and third (about 10 kilometres (6.2 mi)) falls from the confluence of this river and Hudson Bay.

== Geography ==
The surrounding hydrographic slopes of the Puvirnituq River are:

- north side: Qikirtaluup Kuunga River, Little Puvirnituq River;
- east side: Ungava Bay;
- south side: North River (Hudson Bay), Lac Guillaume-Delisle, Péloquin Lake, Vachon River, Nantais Lake, Manarsulik Lake (formerly named "Lake Laflamme"), Pingualuit crater;
- west side: Hudson Bay.

'Course of the river from the head' (segment of 177.8 kilometres (110.5 mi))

The "Puvirnituq River" originates from a small unnamed lake (elevation: 609 metres (1,998 ft)) of mountain located west of the watershed between the Ungava Bay watershed, Hudson Bay and Hudson Strait.

This head lake (length: 33 kilometres (21 mi); width: 16 kilometres (9.9 mi)) is surrounded by mountains of more than 610 metres (2,000 ft) in altitude on the south side, 625 metres (2,051 ft) on the north-west side and 655 metres (2,149 ft) on the east side. This lake is located at 1.2 kilometres (0.75 mi) northeast of Rinfret Lake which flows into the Deception River East (which is part of the Hudson Strait), north of Raglan Lake and 70.8 kilometres (44.0 mi) west of the northern village of Kangiqsujuaq located on the west shore of Ungava Bay.

From the mouth (located to the south) of the lake, the water flows into the "Puvirnituq River" which flows south 32.7 kilometres (20.3 mi) through some lakes formed by the lake. flare of the river. From there, the river branches off to the west where it flows over 20.8 kilometres (12.9 mi) to cross a river coming from the north.

Then the river flows south on 1.0 kilometre (0.62 mi) to the outlet of Lake Saint-Germain (coming from the south), the northern limit of Pingualuit National Park. The latter lake is located northeast of Manarsulik Lake (formerly Lacflamme Lake), which is the head lake of the Vachon River, a tributary of the Arnaud River. The latter flows north-east to spill over the western coast of Ungava Bay. The Pingualuit crater is located south of Manarsulik Lake at 3.2 kilometres (2.0 mi).

From the outlet of Lake Saint-Germain, the "Puvirnituq River" flows westward (75 kilometres (47 mi) to the outlet of lake Nantais. Then the river resumes its course on a last segment of 48.3 kilometres (30.0 mi), crossing Lake Natirnaaliup Tasinga and another lake until pouring on the northeast shore of Lake Lallemand.

'Course downstream of Lake Lallemand' (segment of 102.4 kilometres (63.6 mi))

The Puvirnituq River takes its headwaters from Lallemand Lake (length: 30.8 kilometres (19.1 mi) in the north–south direction, width: 18 kilometres (11 mi)). This complex form of water has some dozens of islands, many peninsulas and bays. This lake receives on the northeastern side the waters of the Little Puvirnituq River. South of the lake, the mouth is a strait of 15.6 kilometres (9.7 mi) long, crossing several bodies of water. The river flows south on 6.1 kilometres (3.8 mi) crossing a body of water formed by the widening of the river. Then the river continues south (26.6 kilometres (16.5 mi) to the north shore of Chamberlaine Lake, which flows westward on 23.3 kilometres (14.5 mi) (including the strait that connects Chamberlaine Lake to the following body of water).

Puvirnituq Bay is located on Hudson Bay; it has a secondary bay stretching over 9.4 kilometres (5.8 mi) inland until the first which is formed by the Avarqutaak Islands. Going up these falls and the Kuukallak pass, one reaches the Puvirnituq lake which is crossed by the Puvirnituq river.

The village of Puvirnituq is located on the north shore of the latter bay, facing Fat Island and Qikirtaaluk Island. The Formal River (coming from the South-East) flows to the south shore of this bay, ie 7.2 kilometres (4.5 mi) from the entrance to the bay.

The main tributaries of the Puvirnituq River are:

- Little Puvirnituq River which flows almost straight to the southwest parallel to the upper part of the Puvirnituq River, to discharge on the north shore of the German Lake. The latter lake is the main body of water in the Puvirnituq River;
- Decoumte River, coming from the southeast.

While flowing to the southwest, the river flows through Papittukaaq Lake and Puvirnituq Lake before spilling over the eastern shore of Hudson Bay at the height of the village of Puvirnituq.

== Toponymy ==
The term "Puvirnituq" is used to refer to the northern village, lake, river, small river, mountains and national park reserve. This term comes from the word "puvirniq" meaning "rotten meat" because the animal swelled and rotted before being opened.

The toponym "rivière de Puvirnituq" was formalized on February 23, 1995 at the Commission de toponymie du Québec.

== See also ==
- Pingualuit crater
- Nunavik
- Hudson Bay
- List of rivers of Quebec
