= Ottawa River =

River in Canada

Ottawa River Rivière des Outaouais (French) Kichi-Sìbì (Algonquin)
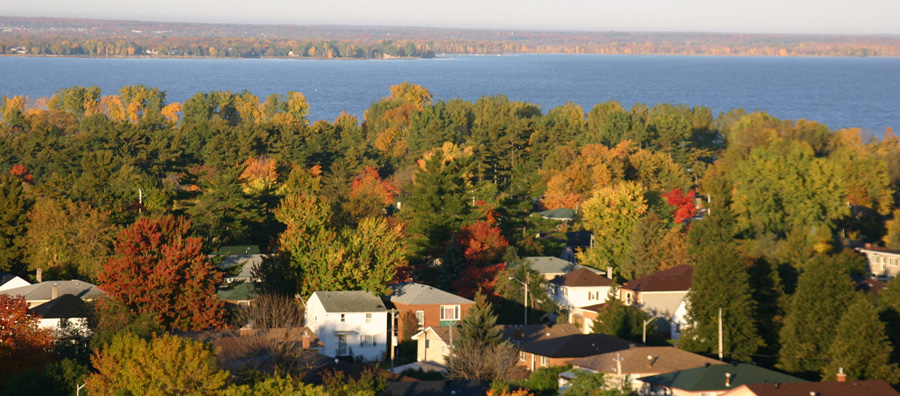
- The Ottawa River in autumn

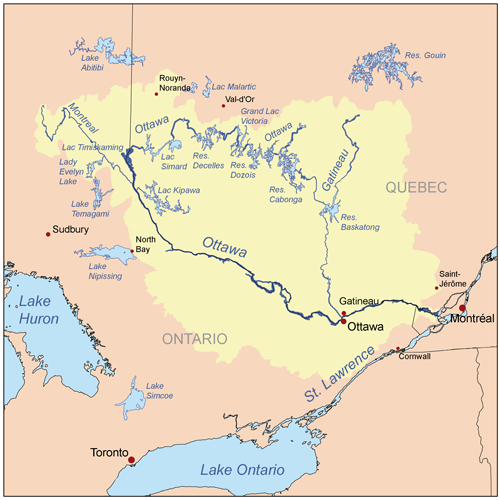
- Map of the Ottawa River drainage basin

Location
- Country: Canada
- Provinces: Quebec, Ontario

Physical characteristics
- Source: Lac des Outaouais
  - location: Lac-Moselle, QC
  - coordinates: 47°38′38″N 75°38′35″W
- Mouth: St. Lawrence River
  - location: Montreal, QC and Ottawa, ON
  - coordinates: 45°27′N 74°05′W
- Length: 1,271 km (790 mi)
- Basin size: 146,300 km^{2} (56,500 sq mi)
- Width
  - maximum: 7,400 m (24,300 ft)
- Depth
  - maximum: 90 m (300 ft)
- Discharge
  - location: Carillon dam
  - average: 1,950 m^{3}/s (69,000 cu ft/s)
  - minimum: 749 m^{3}/s (26,500 cu ft/s)
  - maximum: 5,351 m^{3}/s (189,000 cu ft/s)

Basin features
- Progression: Saint Lawrence River→ Gulf of Saint Lawrence
- River system: Saint Lawrence River drainage basin

The Ottawa River (French: Rivière des Outaouais, Algonquin: Kichi-Sìbì/Kitchissippi) is a river in the Canadian provinces of Ontario and Quebec. It is named after the Algonquin word "to trade", as it was the major trade route of Eastern Canada at the time. For most of its length, it defines the border between these two provinces. It is a major tributary of the St. Lawrence River and the longest river in Quebec.

== Geography ==
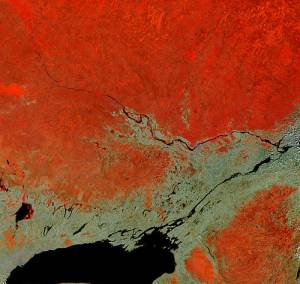
In this false-colour satellite image, the Ottawa River flows southeast, joining the St. Lawrence River which flows northeast. Heavily forested areas appear differing shades of orange/red, while farmland is tan shades.

The river rises at Lac des Outaouais, north of the Laurentian Mountains of central Quebec, and flows west to Lake Timiskaming. From there its route has been used to define the interprovincial border with Ontario.

From Lake Timiskaming, the river flows southeast to Ottawa and Gatineau, where it tumbles over Chaudière Falls and further takes in the Rideau and Gatineau rivers.

The Ottawa River drains into the Lake of Two Mountains and the St. Lawrence River at Montreal. The river is 1,271 km (790 mi) long; it drains an area of 146,300 km^{2} (56,500 sq mi), 65 per cent in Quebec and the rest in Ontario, with a mean discharge of 1,950 m^{3}/s (69,000 cu ft/s). It has a maximum depth of 90 m (300 ft) at the Carillon Reservoir and is 7,400 m (24,300 ft) wide at its widest part.

The average annual mean waterflow measured at Carillon dam, near the Lake of Two Mountains, is 1,939 m^{3}/s (68,500 cu ft/s), with average annual extremes of 749 to 5,351 m^{3}/s (26,500 to 189,000 cu ft/s). Record historic levels since 1964 are a low of 467 m^{3}/s (16,500 cu ft/s) in 2010 and a high of 9,094 m^{3}/s (321,200 cu ft/s) in 2017.

The river flows through large areas of deciduous and coniferous forest formed over thousands of years as trees recolonized the Ottawa Valley after the ice age. Generally, the coniferous forests and blueberry bogs occur on old sand plains left by retreating glaciers, or in wetter areas with clay substrate. The deciduous forests, dominated by birch, maple, beech, oak and ash occur in more mesic areas with better soil, generally around the boundary with the La Varendrye Park. These primeval forests were occasionally affected by natural fire, mostly started by lightning, which led to increased reproduction by pine and oak, as well as fire barrens and their associated species. The vast areas of pine were exploited by early loggers. Later generations of logging removed hemlock for use in tanning leather, leaving a permanent deficit of hemlock in most forests. Associated with the logging and early settlement were vast wildfires which not only removed the forests, but led to soil erosion. Consequently, nearly all the forests show varying degrees of human disturbance. Tracts of older forest are uncommon, and hence they are considered of considerable importance for conservation.

The Ottawa River has large areas of wetlands. Some of the more biologically important wetland areas include (going downstream from Pembroke), the Westmeath sand dune/wetland complex, Mississippi Snye, Breckenridge Nature Reserve, Shirleys Bay, Ottawa Beach/Andrew Haydon Park, Petrie Island, the Duck Islands and Greens Creek. The Westmeath sand dune/wetland complex is significant for its relatively pristine sand dunes, few of which remain along the Ottawa River, and the many associated rare plants. Shirleys Bay has a biologically diverse shoreline alvar, as well as one of the largest silver maple swamps along the river. Like all wetlands, these depend upon the seasonal fluctuations in the water level. High water levels help create and maintain silver maple swamps, while low water periods allow many rare wetland plants to grow on the emerged sand and clay flats. There are five principal wetland vegetation types. One is swamp, mostly silver maple. There are four herbaceous vegetation types, named for the dominant plant species in them: Scirpus, Eleocharis, Sparganium and Typha. Which type occurs in a particular location depends upon factors such as substrate type, water depth, ice-scour and fertility. Inland, and mostly south of the river, older river channels, which date back to the end of the ice age, and no longer have flowing water, have sometimes filled with a different wetland type, peat bog. Examples include Mer Bleue and Alfred Bog.

=== Tributaries ===
Major tributaries include:

- Bonnechere River
- Coulonge River
- Dumoine River
- Gatineau River
- Kipawa River
- du Lièvre River
- Madawaska River
- Mattawa River
- Mississippi River
- Montreal River
- Rivière du Nord
- Noire River
- Petawawa River
- Rideau River
- Rouge River
- South Nation River

=== Communities ===
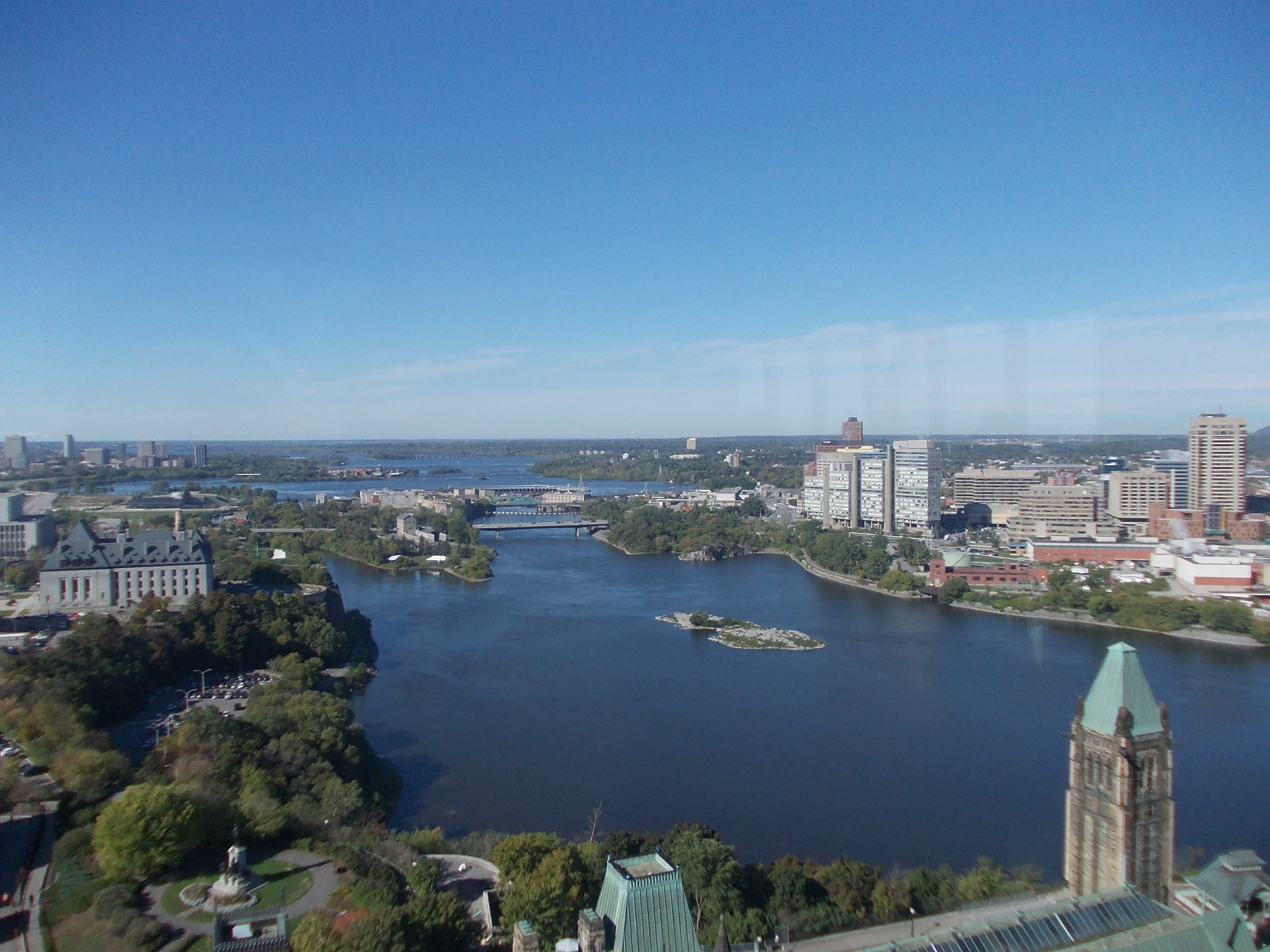
Ottawa River, looking upstream (view from the Peace Tower of Parliament Centre Block)

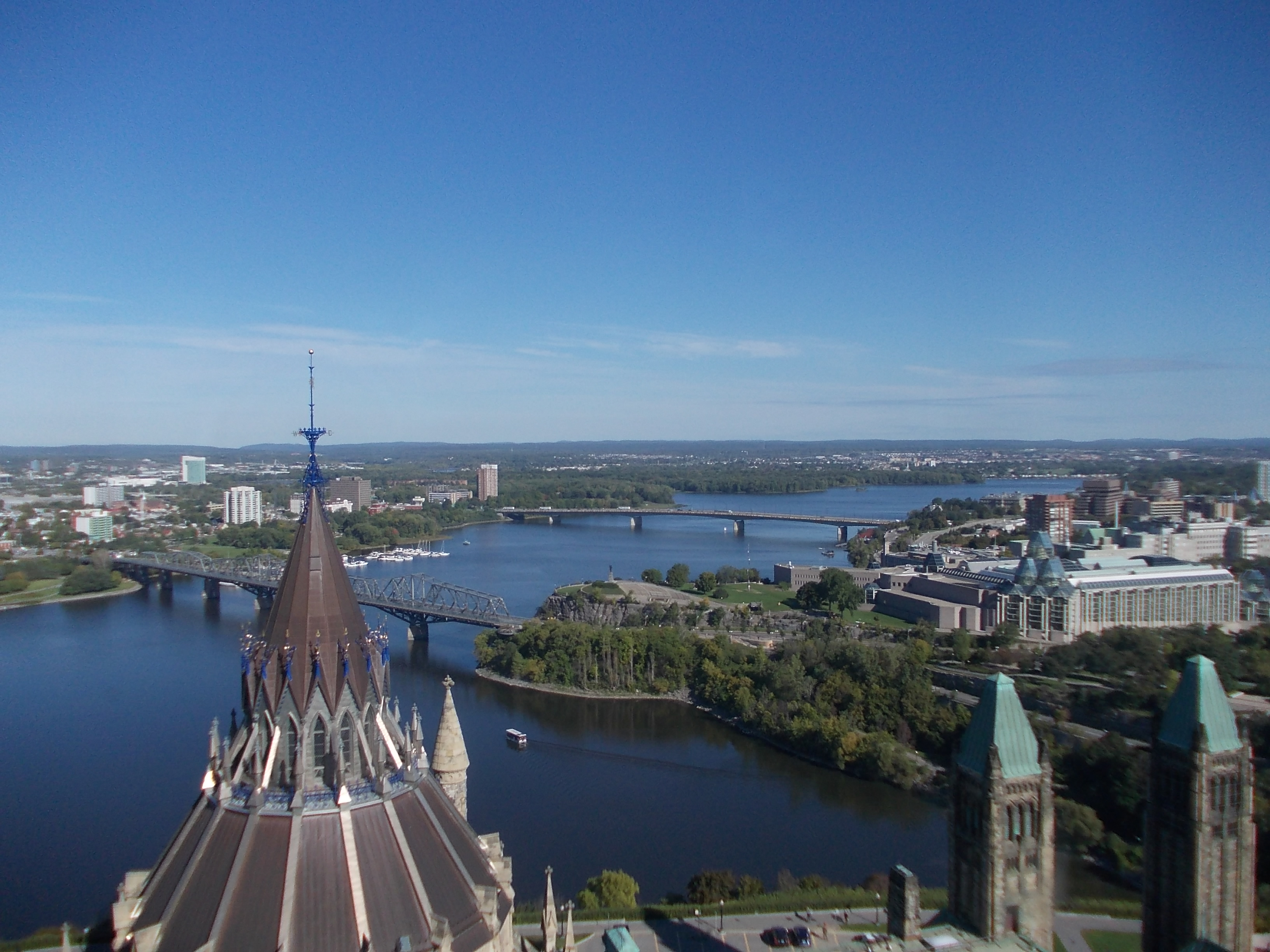
Ottawa River, looking downstream (view from the Peace Tower of Parliament Centre Block)

Communities along the Ottawa River include (in down-stream order):

- Kitcisakik Anicinape Community
- Long Point First Nation
- Moffet, Quebec
- Angliers, Quebec
- Notre-Dame-du-Nord, Quebec
- Timiskaming First Nation
- Temiskaming Shores, Ontario
- Ville-Marie, Quebec
- Témiscaming, Quebec
- Thorne, Ontario
- Mattawa, Ontario
- Deux Rivières, Ontario
- Rapides-des-Joachims, Quebec
- Rolphton, Ontario
- Deep River, Ontario
- Sheenboro, Quebec
- Petawawa, Ontario
- Pembroke, Ontario
- Westmeath, Ontario
- Waltham, Quebec
- Davidson, Quebec
- Fort-Coulonge, Quebec
- La Passe, Ontario
- Campbell's Bay, Quebec
- Bryson, Quebec
- Portage-du-Fort, Quebec
- Bristol, Quebec
- Norway Bay, Quebec
- Braeside, Ontario
- Arnprior, Ontario
- Fitzroy Harbour, Ontario
- Quyon, Quebec
- Constance Bay, Ontario
- Aylmer, Quebec
- Ottawa, Ontario
- Gatineau, Quebec
- Masson-Angers, Quebec
- Cumberland, Ontario
- Rockland, Ontario
- Thurso, Quebec
- Wendover, Ontario
- Plaisance, Quebec
- Papineauville, Quebec
- Montebello, Quebec
- Fassett, Quebec
- L'Orignal, Ontario
- Grenville, Quebec
- Hawkesbury, Ontario
- Carillon, Quebec
- Pointe-Fortune, Quebec
- Saint-André-Est, Quebec
- Rigaud, Quebec
- Saint-Placide, Quebec
- Kanesatake
- Hudson, Quebec
- Oka, Quebec
- Vaudreuil-sur-le-Lac, Quebec
- L'Île-Cadieux, Quebec
- Vaudreuil-Dorion, Quebec
- Terrasse-Vaudreuil, Quebec
- Pincourt, Quebec
- Pointe-des-Cascades, Quebec

=== Islands ===
==== Ontario ====
- Alexandra Island
- Aylmer Island
- Basil Island
- Bate Island
- Beacon Island
- Beckett Island
- Bell Island
- Big Island
- Big Elbow Island
- Bruyère Island
- Burnt Island
- Butternut Island
- Carl Island
- Cedar Island
- Chapman Island
- Chartrand Island
- Chenaux Island
- Christie Island
- Clarence Island
- Coreille Island
- Corinne Island
- Cornelius Island
- Cotnam Island
- Crab Islands
- Cunningam Island
- Cushing Island
- Daisy Island
- Davis Island
- Deep River Islet
- Demers Island
- Dow Island
- Dunlop Island
- Dupras Island
- Dutch Island
- Ellis Island
- Evelyn Island
- Farr Island
- Fish Island
- Fraser Island
- Fury Island
- Gibraltar Island
- Green Island
- Gutzman Island
- Hamilton Island
- Haycock Island
- Hazel Island
- Hazelton Island
- Hen Island
- Hog Island
- Houston Island
- Île Chénier
- Île du Chenail
- Île Ste-Rosalie
- Île Young
- Irving Island
- Jamieson Island
- John Joe Island
- Kate Island
- Kedey's Island
- King Edward Island
- Latour Island
- Lemieux Island
- Lillian Island
- Lorne Island
- Louise Island
- Lower Duck Island
- Lumpy Denommee's Island
- Mackie Island
- Man Island
- Meadow Island
- Merrill Island
- Metcalf Island
- Miller Island
- Morris Island
- Nichol's Island
- Oak Island
- O'Meara Island
- Parker Island
- Pearl Island
- Petrie Island
- Pink Island
- Poker Island
- Princess Island
- Ramsey Island
- Randolph Island
- Rempnouix Island
- Riopelle Island
- Rocher Capitaine Island
- Ruby Islet
- Sack's Island
- Sandbar Island
- Santa Island
- Sawlog Island
- Shoal Island
- Short Turn Island
- Steamer Island
- Snake Island
- Sullivan Island
- Upper Duck Island
- Victoria Island
- Wabewawa Island
- Willson Island
- Windsor Island

==== Quebec ====
- L'Île
- Île Allen
- Île aux Allumettes
- Île Armstrong
- Île Avelle
- Bald Rock
- Île Béique
- Îles Benny
- Île Bernard
- Île Bernardin
- Île Berry
- Île à Bertrand
- Île Boom
- Île Bray
- Île Brisseau
- Île Brunet
- Île Bryson
- Île Cadieux
- Île Cobb
- Île de Carillon
- Île du Centre
- Île du Chef
- Île du Chenal Blind
- Île du Chicot
- Îles à Cole
- Île du Collège
- Île de la Compagnie
- Île à Cowley
- Île à Crépault
- Île D'Arcy
- Île Davidson
- Île Dog
- Île Dubé
- Île d'Edelman
- Île à Everill
- Île Fer à Cheval
- Île du Finlandais
- Îles Finlay
- Île Fitzpatrick
- Île au Foin
- Île Fox (Pontiac)
- Île Fox (Témiscamingue)
- Île French
- Île Frigon
- Île Gagnon
- Rocher à Gillis
- Rochers aux Goélands
- Île Graham
- Île du Grand Calumet
- Île Green
- Île Greene
- Île à Griffin
- Île Harbec
- Île Hemlock
- Île Henry
- Île Hiam
- Île Jacey
- Île John-Park
- Île Jones
- Îles Jumelles
- Île Kettle
- Île Lafleur
- Île Lafontaine
- Île Lasalle
- Île à Lawn
- Île Leblanc
- Île Lemoine
- Île Leroux
- Île Lighthouse (L'Isle-aux-Allumettes)
- Île Lighthouse (Bristol)
- Île Limerick
- Petite île Limerick
- Île Lorelei
- Île Mann
- Île Marcotte
- Île à Marion
- Île Mohr
- Île Morrison
- Île Mulligan
- Île O'Connor
- Île Oscar-Béchamp
- Île Oster
- Île Paquin
- Île à Payne
- Îles Pelley
- Île Philemon
- Île Pigs
- Île aux Pins
- Île des Quinze
- Île Rainville
- Île des Rapides
- Île du Refuge
- Île Reid (Clarendon)
- Île Reid (L'Isle-aux-Allumettes)
- Île Rita
- Île à Ritté
- Île du Rocher Fendu
- Île à Rouleau
- Île à Roussin
- Île de Sable
- Petite île Sèche
- La Semelle
- Île Smith
- Île Snake
- Île des Soeurs
- Île Soulier
- Île Squelette
- Île Submergée
- Île Sunset
- Île Todd
- Île à Tom
- Île à Tom-Simon
- Île aux Tourtes
- Île Verte
- Île Victoria
- Île Wickens
- Île Winneway
- Île Woods
- Île Wight
- Île Young (Pontiac)
- Île Young (Gatineau)
- Île Yvette-Naubert

== Geology ==
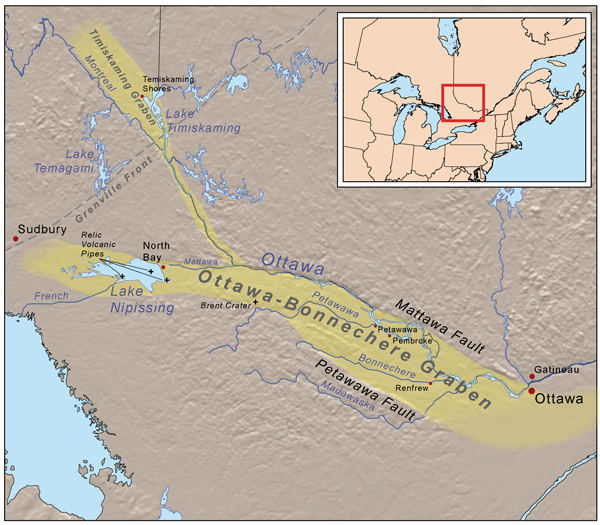
Map of the Ottawa-Bonnechere Graben

The Ottawa River lies in the Ottawa-Bonnechere Graben, which is a Mesozoic rift valley that formed 175 million years ago. Much of the river flows through the Canadian Shield, although lower areas flow through limestone plains and glacial deposits.

As the glacial ice sheet began to retreat at the end of the last ice age, the Ottawa River valley, which, along with the St. Lawrence River valley and Lake Champlain, had been depressed to below sea level by the glacier's weight, filled with sea water. The resulting arm of the ocean is known as the Champlain Sea. Fossil remains of marine life dating 12 to 10 thousand years ago have been found in marine clay throughout the region. Sand deposits from this era have produced vast plains, often dominated by pine forests, as well as localized areas of sand dunes, such as Westmeath and Constance Bay. Clay deposits from this period have resulted in areas of poor drainage, large swamps, and peat bogs in some ancient channels of this river. Hence, the distribution of forests and wetlands is very much a product of these past glacial events.

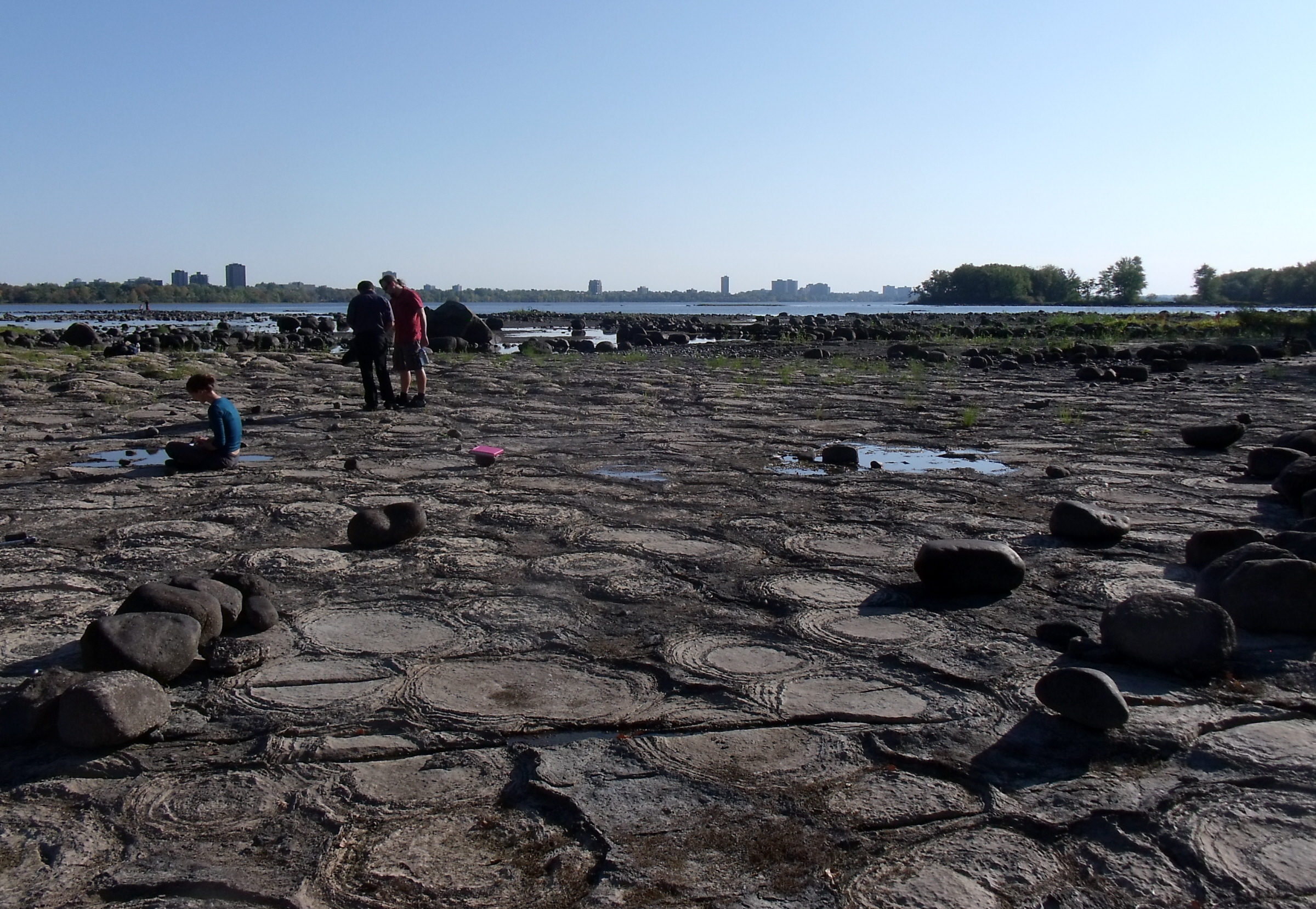
Ottawa River Stromatolite Bed, near the Champlain Bridge (Ottawa), with the Ottawa skyline in the background

Large deposits of a material commonly known as Leda clay also formed. These deposits become highly unstable after heavy rains. Numerous landslides have occurred as a result. The former site of the town of Lemieux, Ontario collapsed into the South Nation River in 1993. The town's residents had previously been relocated because of the suspected instability of the earth in that location.

As the land gradually rose again the sea coast retreated and the fresh water courses of today took shape. Following the demise of the Champlain Sea the Ottawa River Valley continued to drain the waters of the emerging Upper Great Lakes basin through Lake Nipissing and the Mattawa River. Owing to the ongoing uplift of the land, the eastward flow became blocked around 4000 years ago. Thereafter Lake Nipissing drained westward, through the French River which later became a link in the historic canoe route to the West.

== History ==
As it does to this day, the river played a vital role in life of the Algonquin people, who lived throughout its watershed at contact. The river is called Kichisìpi, meaning "Great River" in Anicinàbemowin, the Algonquin language. The Algonquin define themselves in terms of their position on the river, referring to themselves as the Omàmiwinini, 'down-river people'. Although a majority of the Algonquin First Nation lives in Quebec, the entire Ottawa Valley is Algonquin traditional territory. Present settlement is a result of adaptations made as a result of settler pressures.

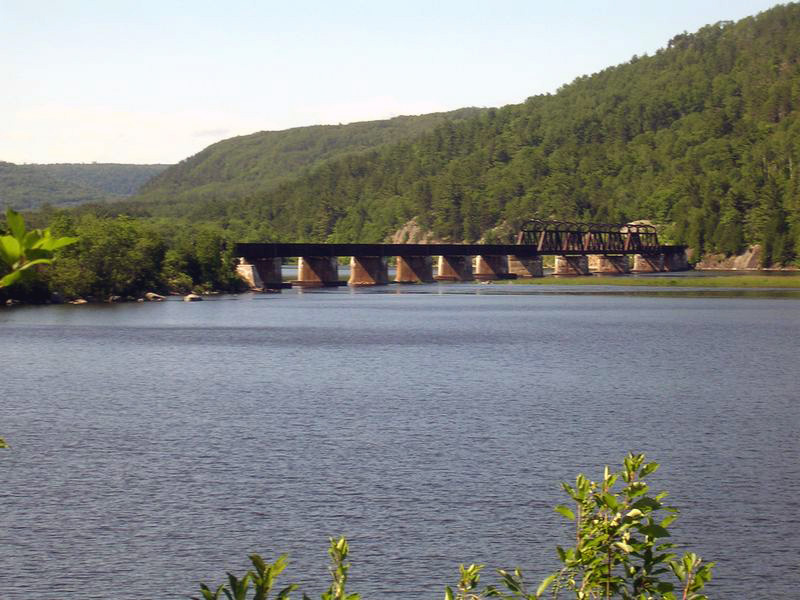
A railway bridge over the Ottawa River in Mattawa, Ontario.

Some early European explorers, possibly considering the Ottawa River to be more significant than the Upper St. Lawrence River, applied the name River Canada to the Ottawa River and the St. Lawrence River below the confluence at Montreal. As the extent of the Great Lakes became clear and the river began to be regarded as a tributary, it was variously known as the Grand River, "Great River" or Grand River of the Algonquins before the present name was settled upon. This name change resulted from the Ottawa peoples' control of the river c. 1685. However, only one band of Ottawa, the Kinouncherpirini or Keinouch, ever inhabited the Ottawa Valley.

In 1615, Samuel de Champlain and Étienne Brûlé, assisted by Algonquin guides, were the first Europeans to travel up the Ottawa River and follow the water route west along the Mattawa and French Rivers to the Great Lakes. See Canadian Canoe Routes (early). For the following two centuries, this route was used by French fur traders, voyageurs and coureurs des bois to Canada's interior. The river posed serious hazards to these travellers. The section near Deux Rivières used to have spectacular and wild rapids, namely the Rapide de la Veillée, the Trou, the Rapide des Deux Rivières, and the Rapide de la Roche Capitaine. (These rapids are now submerged under the reservoir of Holden Lake.) In 1800, explorer Daniel Harmon reported 14 crosses marking the deaths of voyageurs who had drowned in the dangerous waters along this section of the Ottawa.

The main trading posts along the river were: Lachine, Fort Coulonge, Lac des Allumettes, Mattawa House, where west-bound canoes left the river and Fort Témiscamingue. From Lake Timiskaming a portage led north to the Abitibi River and James Bay.

In the early 19th century, the Ottawa River and its tributaries were used to gain access to large virgin forests of white pine. A booming trade in timber developed, and large rafts of logs were floated down the river. A scattering of small subsistence farming communities developed along the shores of the river to provide manpower for the lumber camps in winter. In 1832, following the War of 1812, the Ottawa River gained strategic importance when the Carillon Canal was completed. Together with the Rideau Canal, the Carillon Canal was constructed to provide an alternate military supply route to Kingston and Lake Ontario, bypassing the route along the Saint Lawrence River.

== Power generation ==
A pulp and paper mill (at Témiscaming) and several hydroelectric dams have been constructed on the river. In 1950, the dam at Rapides-des-Joachims was built, forming Holden Lake behind it and thereby submerging the rapids and portages at Deux Rivières. These hydro dams have had negative effects upon shoreline and wetland ecosystems, and are thought to also be responsible for the near extermination of American eels, which were once an abundant species in the river, but which are now uncommon. As an economic route, its importance was eclipsed by railroad and highways in the 20th century. It is no longer used for log driving, however, it is still extensively used for recreational boating. Some 20,000 pleasure boaters visit the Carillon Canal annually.

Today, Outaouais Herald Emeritus at the Canadian Heraldic Authority is named after the river.

=== Hydroelectric installations ===
Hydroelectric installations on the Upper Ottawa (in downstream order):

Installation	Type	Generating cap.	Year built	Name of reservoir	Operator
Bourque Dam	Dam	n/a	1949	Dozois Reservoir	Hydro-Québec
Rapide-7	Generating station	48 MW	1941 / 1949	Decelles Lake	Hydro-Québec
Rapide-2	Run of river g.s.	48 MW	1954	n/a	Hydro-Québec
Rapides-des-Quinze	Run of river g.s.	95 MW	1923	n/a	Hydro-Québec
Rapides-des-Îles	Run of river g.s.	147 MW	1966	n/a	Hydro-Québec
Première-Chute	Run of river g.s.	130 MW	1968	n/a	Hydro-Québec

Lower Ottawa (in downstream order):

Installation	Type	Generating cap.	Year built	Name of reservoir	Operator
Otto Holden	Run of river g.s.	243 MW	1952	n/a	Ontario Power Generation
Des Joachims	Run of river g.s.	429 MW	1950	Holden Lake	Ontario Power Generation
Bryson	Run of river g.s.	61 MW	1925	n/a	Hydro-Québec
Chenaux	Run of river g.s.	144 MW	1950	n/a	Ontario Power Generation
Chute-des-Chats (Chats Falls)	Run of river g.s.	185 MW	1931	Lac des Chats	Hydro-Québec and OPG *
Hull-2	Run of river g.s.	27 MW	1920	n/a	Hydro-Québec
Carillon	Run of river g.s.	752 MW	1962	n/a	Hydro-Québec

* Ontario Power Generation operates generators 2, 3, 4, and 5 with a capacity of 96 MW; and Hydro-Québec operates generators 6, 7, 8, and 9 with a capacity of 89 MW.

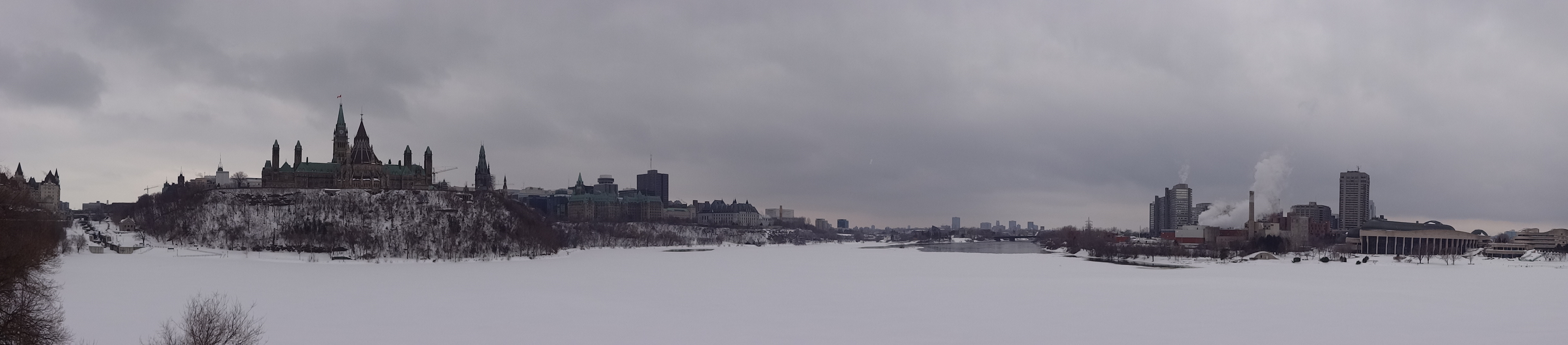
Ottawa River overlooking Parliament Hill to the left and the Canadian Museum of History to the right

== Protected areas ==
Numerous non-contiguous areas of the Ottawa River and its shores are protected in a variety of provincial parks, conservation areas, and municipal parks.

In Quebec, there are 3 national parks directly along the Ottawa River (Oka National Park, Plaisance National Park, and Opémican National Park), as well as one major nature reserve through which the river runs (La Vérendrye Wildlife Reserve). Several ZECs (zone d'exploitation contrôlée) also line the Ottawa River.

Ontario has 7 provincial parks along the banks of the Ottawa River: Voyageur Provincial Park, Fitzroy Provincial Park, Ottawa River Provincial Park, Westmeath Provincial Park, Petawawa Terrace Provincial Park, Driftwood Provincial Park, and Alexander Lake Forest Provincial Park.

=== Ottawa River Provincial Park ===
Ottawa River Provincial Park
- IUCN category II (national park)
- Location: Renfrew County, Ontario, Canada
- Coordinates: 45°42′55″N 76°43′12″W
- Area: 125.05 ha (309.0 acres)
- Designation: Waterway
- Established: 1989
- Governing body: Ontario Parks
- Website: www.ontarioparks.ca/park/ottawariver

The Ottawa River Provincial Park is in the Township of Whitewater Region, Ontario, protecting a series of pristine islands and a small undeveloped section of shoreline along the Ontario side of the Ottawa River. This section of the Ottawa River is known for its whitewater, and is used by a number of commercial rafting companies and many recreational kayakers and canoeists.

The park is a non-operating park, meaning that there are no services and facilities for visitors. The park can be used for backcountry camping, whitewater canoeing, swimming, hunting, and fishing.

Some of the islands included in the park are Big, Butternut, Cedar, Hazelton, and Lorne Islands, in addition to many unnamed islands. They consist of marble bedrock or low-lying alluvial sands and silts. A total of sixteen regionally significant plant species, such as little bluestem (Andropogon scoparius), cordgrass (Spartina pectinata) and Indiangrass (Sorghastrum nutans) have been found in the park, as well as the nationally significant lake cress (Rorippa aquatica).

== See also ==
- Lac Deschênes
- List of Ontario rivers
- List of crossings of the Ottawa River
- List of islands of Ontario#Ottawa River
- List of longest rivers of Canada
- Southern Ontario
- Eastern Ontario
- List of Quebec rivers
- Rivière des Mille Îles
- Rivière des Prairies
