= Pingualuit National Park =

National park of Quebec, Canada

Parc national des Pingualuit
- IUCN category II (national park)
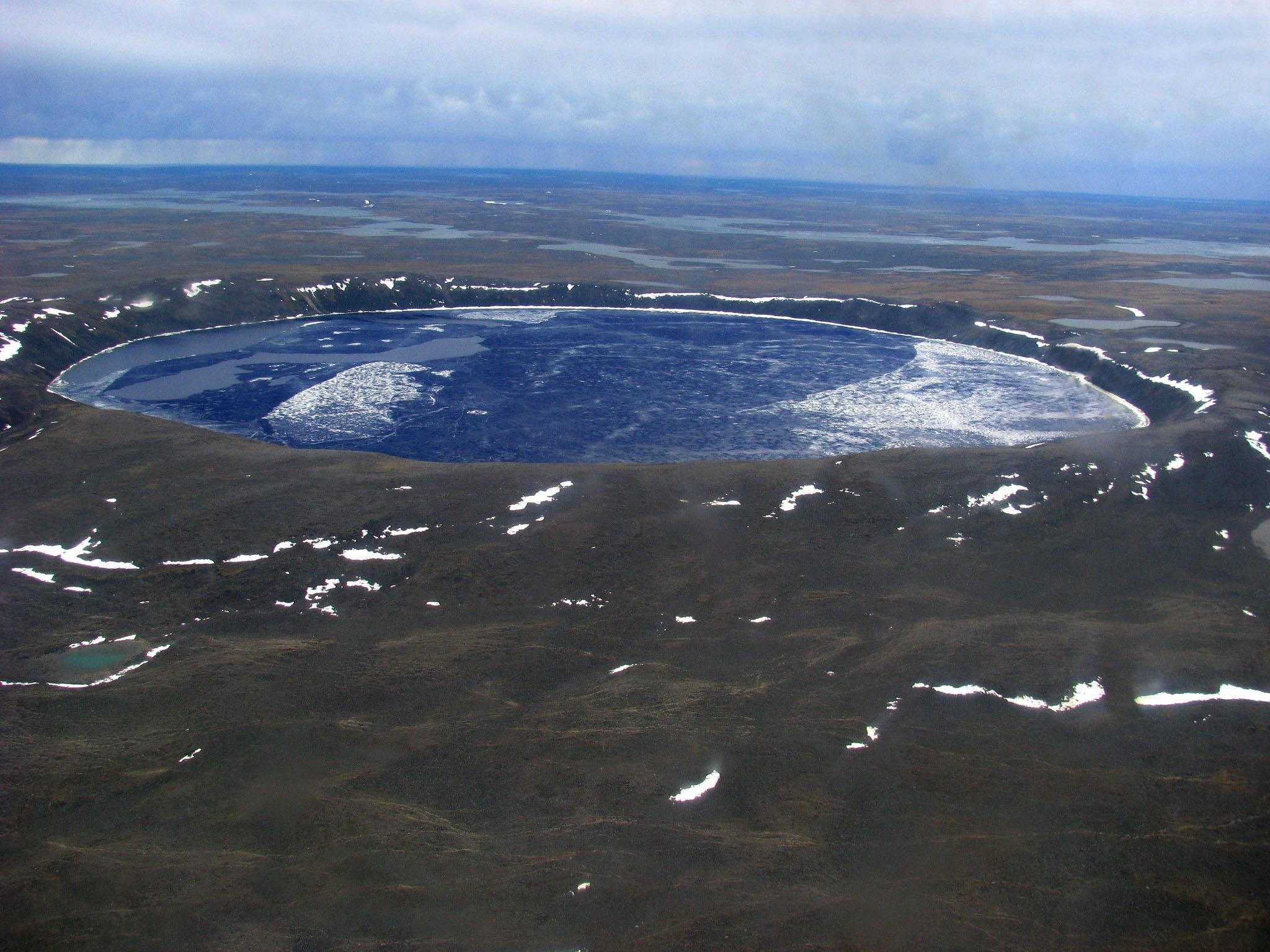
- Pingualuit Crater
- Interactive map of Parc national des Pingualuit
- Location: Kativik, Quebec, Canada
- Nearest city: Kangiqsujuaq
- Coordinates: 61°18′00″N 73°40′00″W
- Area: 1,133.90 km^{2} (437.80 sq mi)
- Established: November 30, 2007
- Governing body: Kativik Regional Government

Pingualuit National Park (French: Parc national des Pingualuit) is a Quebec provincial park located in the Ungava Peninsula 100 km (62 mi) south-west of the Inuit village of Kangiqsujuaq. The park is 1,133.90 km^{2} (437.80 sq mi) in size, with the Pingualuit crater, a young meteorite crater, as its centerpiece.

The park is managed by the Kativik Regional Government.

== Flora and fauna ==
The park is located about 350 kilometres north of the tree line, in an area of continuous permafrost. The Arctic tundra is characterized by the total absence of trees and discontinuous vegetation. The flora is very little diversified due to the climatic conditions which subject the vegetation to violent winds, intense cold and dehydration. Lichens, mosses and sphagnum dominate the territory with a few species of rare herbaceous plants and shrubs.

Traffic is restricted in a few areas to ensure no unnecessary damage caused by trampling throughout the park.

Arctic fauna is very low in diversity, but is often compensated by its abundance. The Rivière aux Feuilles caribou herd stays in the park from May to July. There are also Canada geese, snow geese, wolves, foxes, snowy owls, and Arctic hares that are present in the park. The park territory also hosts Hudson Strait polar bears, which move inland.

== Tourism and activities ==
The months of July and August as well as the beginning of September are the best times to go on an expedition in the park. The temperature is very mild, although it can become negative. In winter it is possible to do dog sledding or ski touring, March and April would be the best months.

Several outdoor activities are possible such as hiking, kayaking, fishing, ice fishing, nature observation, dog sledding and cross-country skiing. In addition, it is possible to participate in the construction of an igloo and spend a night there. The community of Kangiqsujuaq also organizes tours of the permanent exhibition. An interpretation centre is located in the community of Kangiqsujuaq, relating customary stories and legends.

== See also ==
- Société des établissements de plein air du Québec
- National parks of Quebec
