= Baie-aux-Feuilles National Park Reserve =

Natural Reserve of Nord-du-Quebec, Canada

- French: Réserve de parc national de la Baie-aux-Feuilles
- IUCN category II (national park)
- Location within Quebec
- Interactive map of Baie-aux-Feuilles National Park Reserve
- Location: Canada; Quebec; Kativik
- Nearest city: Kuujjuaq
- Coordinates: 58.926944°N 69.926944°W
- Area: 3,868.08 kilometres (2,403.51 mi)
- Established: Creation of the Reserve as of 7
- Administrator: Ministère du Développement durable, de l'Environnement et des Parcs

The Réserve de parc national de la Baie-aux-Feuilles (in English: Baie-aux-Feuilles National Park Reserve) is a protected area located in the administrative region of Nord-du-Québec, in Quebec, in Canada. This 3,868.1 kilometres (2,403.53 mi) territory, set aside in 2008, aims to protect one of the most important estuaries of Nord-du-Québec, that of the rivière aux Feuilles, which knows tides of 17 meters (56 ft) in height. It is also the only region where musk ox are found in Quebec.

== See also ==
- National Parks of Quebec
- Nunavik
- Rivière aux Feuilles, a stream
