= Assinica =

Assinica may refer to:

- Assinica Lake, Quebec, Canada
- Assinica River, Quebec, Canada
- Assinica National Park Reserve, Quebec, Canada
