= Collines-Ondulées National Park Reserve =

Natural Reserve of Center-West of Quebec, Canada

- French: Réserve de parc national des Collines-Ondulées
- IUCN category II (national park)
- Location within Quebec
- Interactive map of Collines-Ondulées National Park Reserve
- Location: Canada; Quebec; Kativik
- Nearest city: Schefferville
- Coordinates: 55.781111°N 67.289167°W
- Area: 1,659.47 kilometres (1,031.15 mi)
- Established: Creation of the Reserve as of 7
- Administrator: Ministère du Développement durable, de l'Environnement et des Parcs

The reserve de parc national des Collines-Ondulées is a protected area north of Quebec, in Canada. The 1,659.5 kilometres (1,031.17 mi) territory, designated in 2008, is intended to protect a section of the Labrador Trough. The reserve is also a transition zone between boreal and northern species.

== See also ==
- National Parks of Quebec
- Nunavik
