= Iluiliq National Park Reserve =

Natural Reserve of Center-West of Quebec, Canada

Collines-Ondulées National Park Reserve
- French: Réserve de parc national Iluiliq
- IUCN category II (national park)
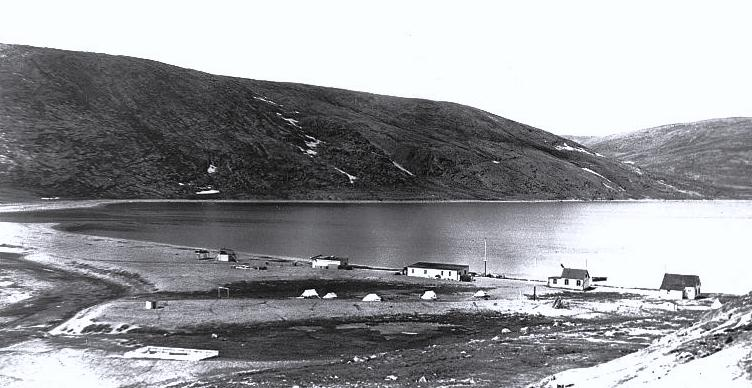

- Location within Quebec
- Interactive map of Collines-Ondulées National Park Reserve
- Location: Canada; Quebec; Kativik
- Coordinates: 62.472500°N 77.204167°W
- Area: 1,263 kilometres (784.79 mi)
- Established: Creation of the Reserve as of 7 October 2008
- Administrator: Ministère du Développement durable, de l'Environnement et des Parcs
- Website: Official site

The Iluiliq National Park Reserve, formerly the Cap-Wolstenholme National Park Reserve, is a protected area located in the far north of Quebec, in Canada. This territory of 1,263 kilometres (784.79 mi) protects cliffs and fjord reaching heights of 300 meters (980 ft). It also contains the third largest colony of Thick-billed Murre in North America.

== See also ==
- Nunavik
- Cape Wolstenholme
- National Parks of Quebec
