= Monts-de-Puvirnituq National Park Reserve =

Natural Reserve of Nord-du-Quebec, Canada

- French: Réserve de parc national des Monts-de-Puvirnituq
- IUCN category II (national park)
- Location within Quebec
- Interactive map of Monts-de-Puvirnituq National Park Reserve
- Location: Canada; Quebec; Kativik
- Nearest city: Akulivik
- Coordinates: 61°06′00″N 77°12′00″W
- Area: 3,159 kilometres (1,962.91 mi)
- Created: Creation of the Reserve as of 17 May 1992
- Administrator: Ministère du Développement durable, de l'Environnement et des Parcs

The réserve de parc national des Monts-de-Puvirnituq is a protected area located in the administrative region of Nord-du-Québec, in Quebec, in Canada. The 3,159 kilometres (1,962.91 mi) territory is located northwest of Akulivik.

The Puvirnituq Mountains are a chain of parallel hills formed by the successive folding of the Earth's crust.

== Fauna and flora ==
The national park reserve is one of few areas in Quebec where polar bears give birth to their young. It is also the only whistling swan nesting area in Quebec. The park is also frequented by a herd of caribou from the Rivière aux Feuilles.

Being more than 400 kilometres (250 mi) north of the treeline, and having a growing season of only 70 days per year, vegetation is mostly shrub in the valleys, with the top of the hills dominated by mosses and lichen.

== See also ==
- Nunavik
- National Parks of Quebec
