= Oka National Park =

National park in Quebec, Canada

Coordinates: 45.4681°N 74.0306°W

- IUCN category II (national park)
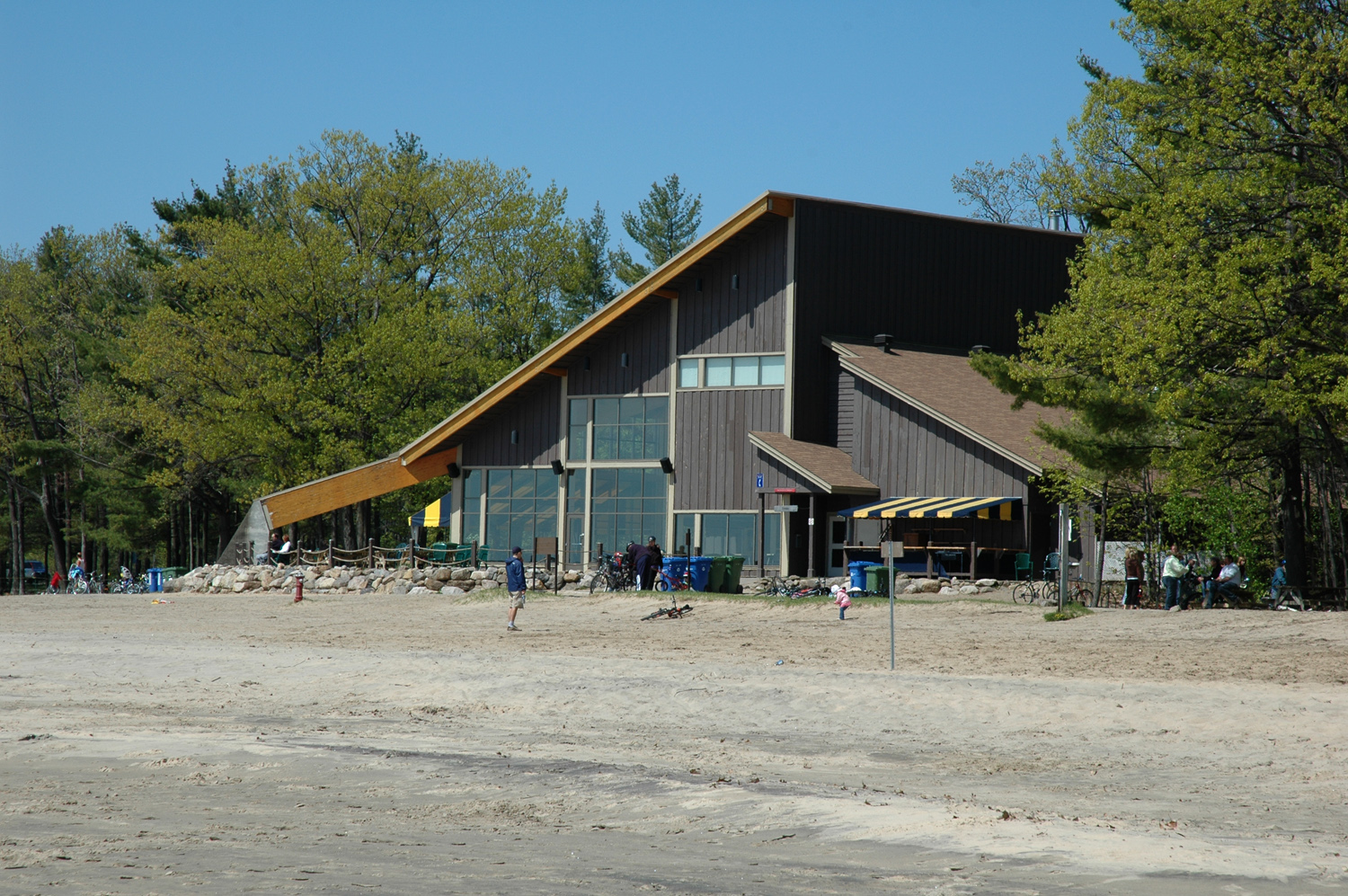
- Interactive map of Oka National Park
- Location: Oka, Deux-Montagnes Regional County Municipality, Quebec, Canada

Oka National Park (Parc national d'Oka) is a small provincially administered park, located within the village of Oka and between Pointe-Calumet on one side and Saint-Placide on the other side. on the north shore of Lac des Deux Montagnes in Quebec, Canada. The Park is home to one of the largest heronries in Quebec and the historical site of Calvaire d'Oka (Calvary of Oka) shrine which dates from 1740.

== Facilities ==
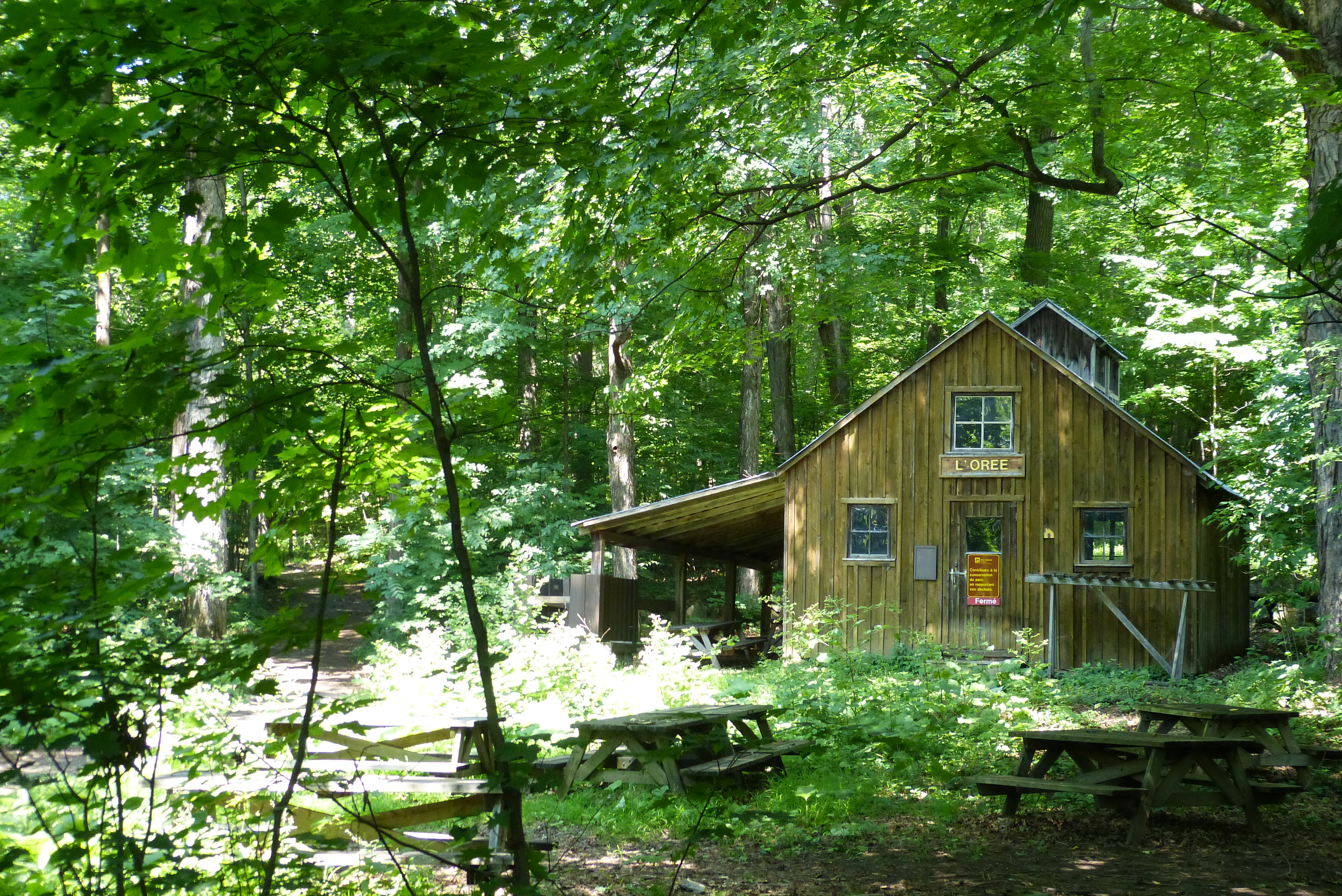
L'Orée shelter in Oka National Park

The Park has an area of 23.7 square kilometres (9.2 sq mi). It shares territory with the municipality of Oka, which is in the Deux-Montagnes Regional County Municipality and the region of Laurentides. The Park includes beaches and marshes located north of Lac des Deux Montagnes, as well as the Calvaire d'Oka. The Park is traversed by Highway 344 and is also accessible by Quebec Autoroute 640 which ends on Highway 344.

== The Oka Calvaire trail ==
The priests of the Sulpician order built seven chapels on the low hills of Oka to mark some of the Stations of the Cross.

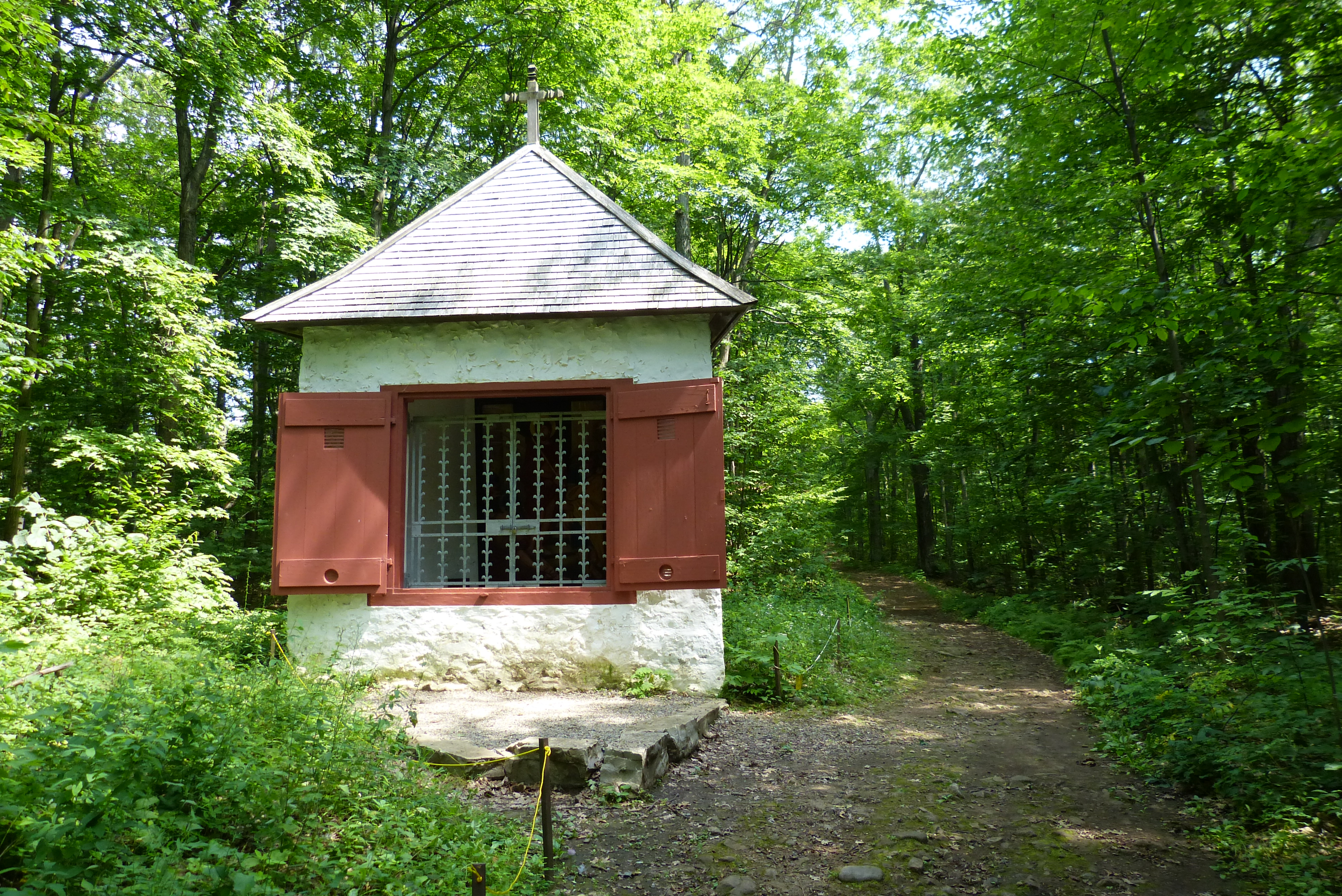
Chapel on the way up the Oka Calvaire trail.

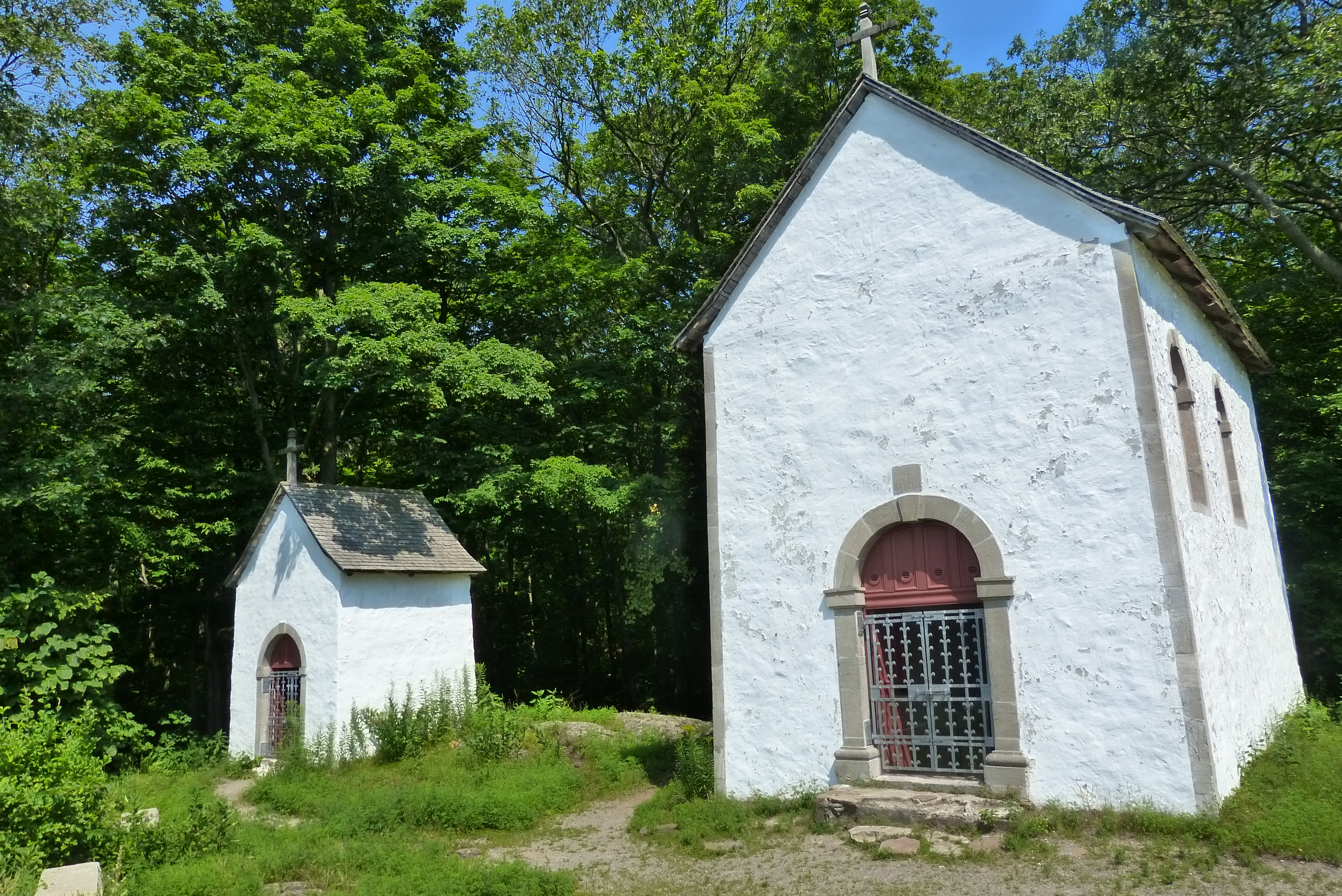
Two of the three chapels at the top of the Oka Calvaire trail.

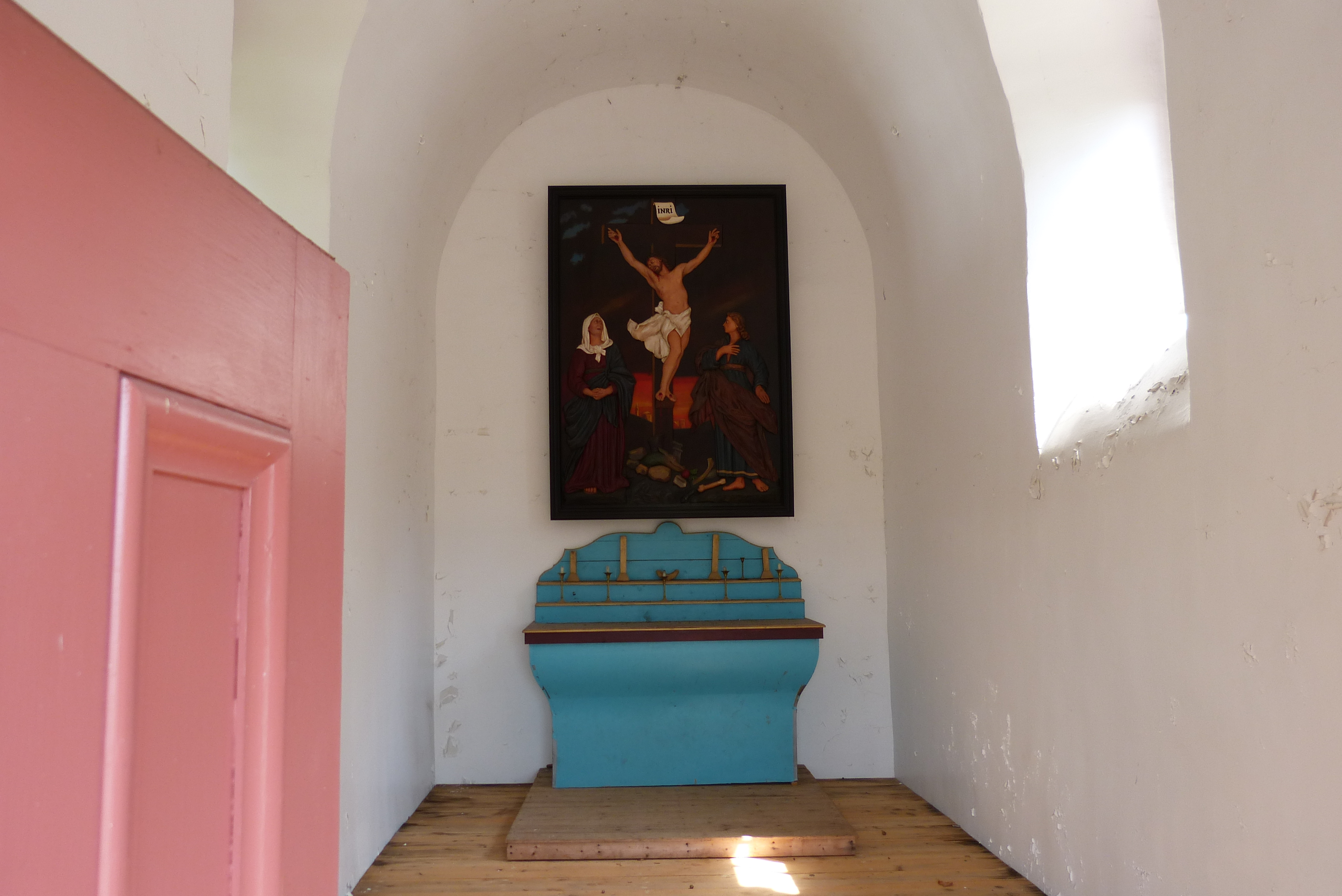
Inside view of one of the Oka Calvaire chapels.

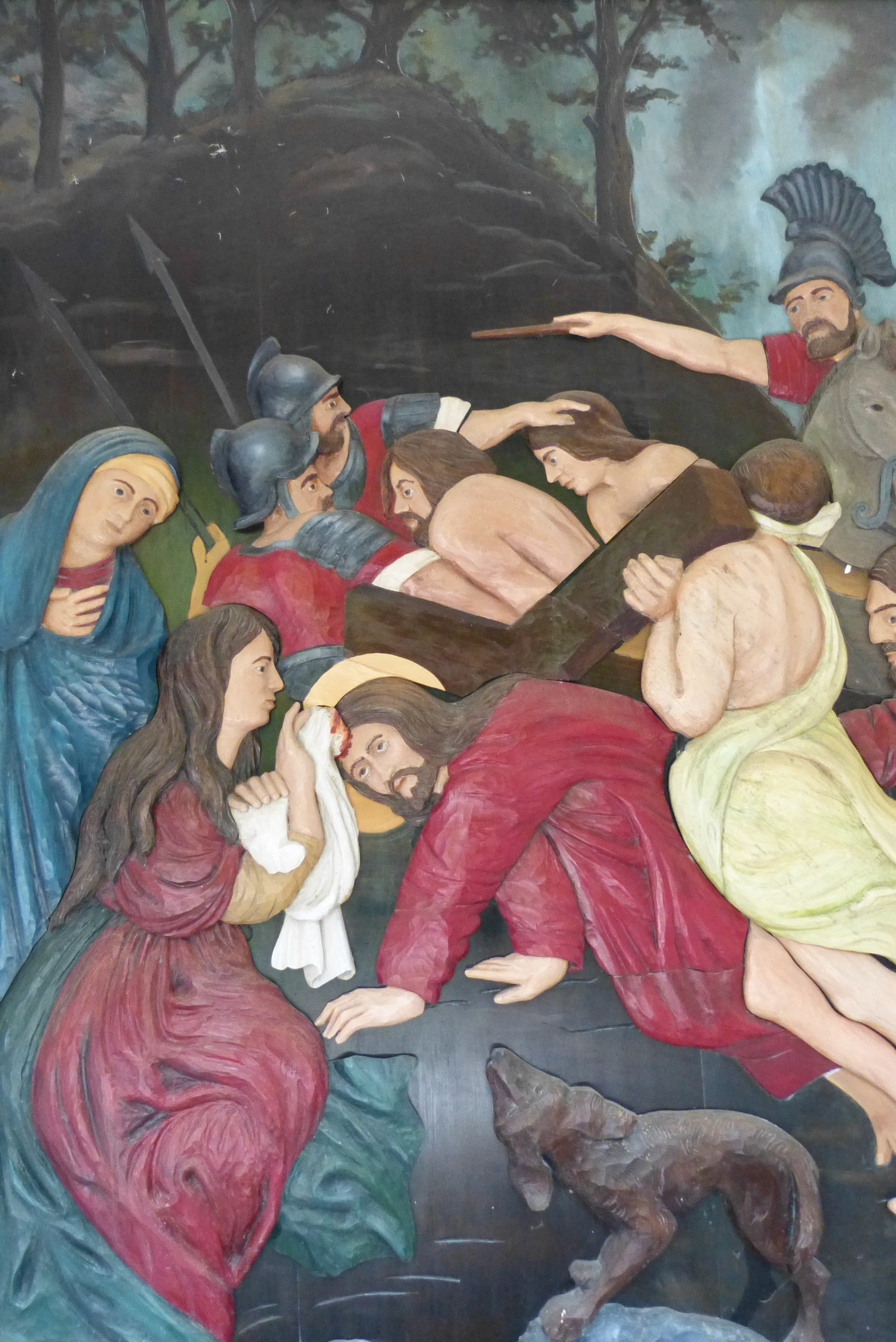
Painted relief wood panel in one of the Oka Calvaire chapels.

== See also ==
- Société des établissements de plein air du Québec
