= Opémican National Park =

Natural Reserve of Abitibi-Témiscamingue, Quebec, Canada

- French: Parc national d'Opémican
- IUCN category II (national park)
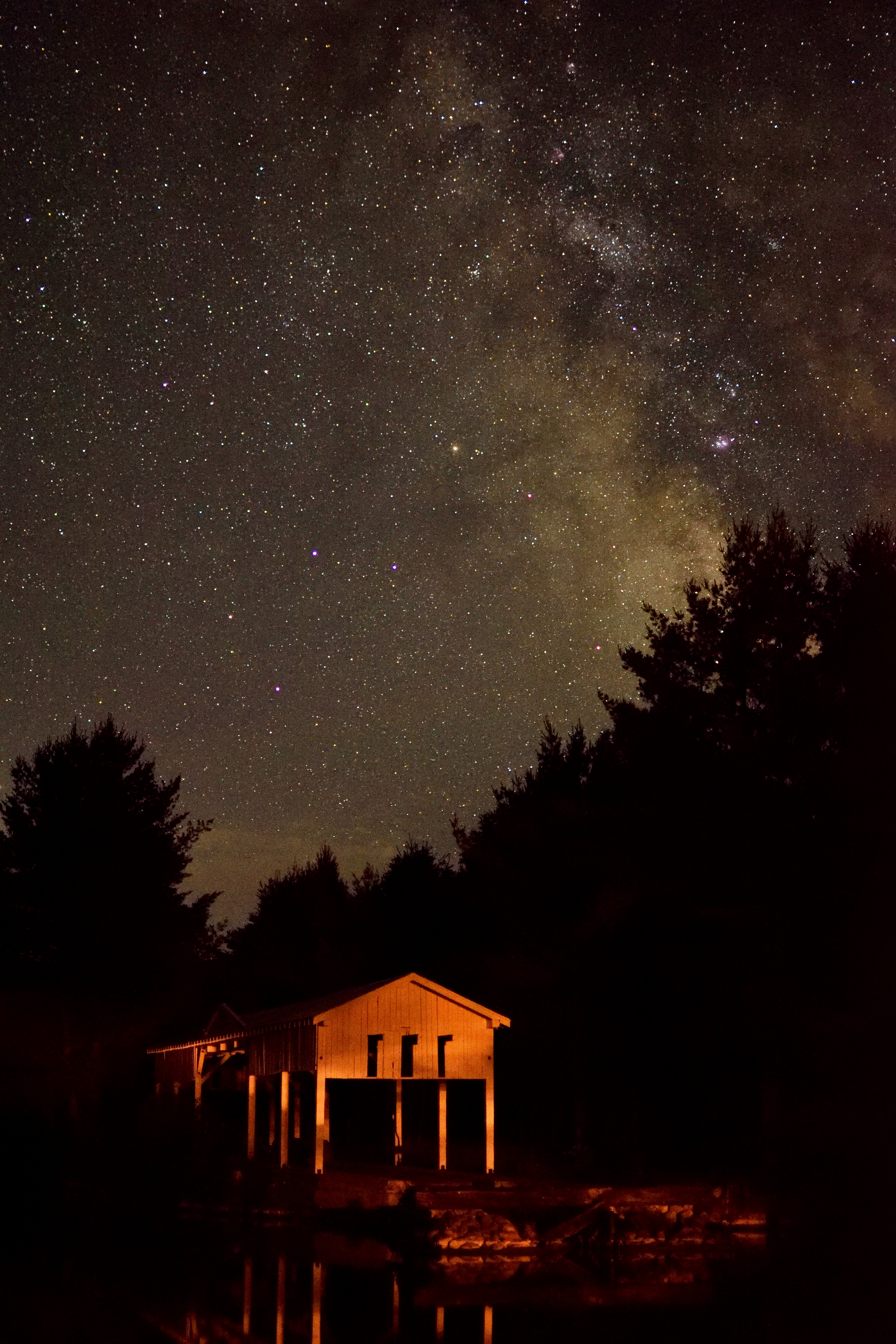
- Former stonecutting shed by the shores of Lake Timiskaming in the Pointe-Opémican sector

- Location within Quebec
- Interactive map of Opémican National Park
- Location: Canada; Quebec; Témiscamingue Regional County Municipality
- Nearest town: Temiscaming
- Coordinates: 46°53′06″N 79°06′09″W
- Area: 252.5 kilometres (156.90 mi)
- Created: 2013
- Administrator: Sépaq

The parc national d'Opémican is a national park of Quebec (Canada) located south of Abitibi-Témiscamingue, between Laniel and Témiscaming. The park is 252 kilometres (156.59 mi) in size and was established on 19 December 2013. It ensures the protection of the characteristic landscape of the Southern Laurentians.

== Geography ==
This park located in the natural region of the southern Laurentians is bordered on both sides by lakes Timiskaming and Kipawa. Covering an area of 252.5 kilometres (156.90 mi), this park is divided into three distinct sectors: the Rivière-Kipawa sector (inaugurated in 2018), the Pointe-Opémican sector and the Lac-Marsac sector. The Pointe-Opémican sector has a campground of around sixty sites under the tall pines, a small village of 11 ready-to-camp Étoile near Lake Timiskaming and its sandy shores, making it a great destination for nautical activities.

The park added a small hebertism course in the Rivière-Kipawa sector, near the Grande Chute. In addition, this sector has 4 ready-to-camp Étoile near the walls of Lake Timiskaming. White and red pines, symbol of the junction of the deciduous and boreal domains dominate in the park area.

== Features ==
=== Flora ===
About ten vascular plants are present.

== Facilities and services ==
A service center, located in the Pointe-Opémican sector, offers the park's main services, including a boutique and a convenience store, as well as information to visitors. There is also a reception post in Laniel.

=== Camping ===
There is a rustic campground, that of Paroi-aux-Faucons, in the Kipawa River sector as well as a campground at Pointe-Opémican.

== See also ==
- Lake Timiskaming
- National Parks of Quebec
