= Aiguebelle National Park =

National park of Quebec, Canada

- IUCN category II (national park)
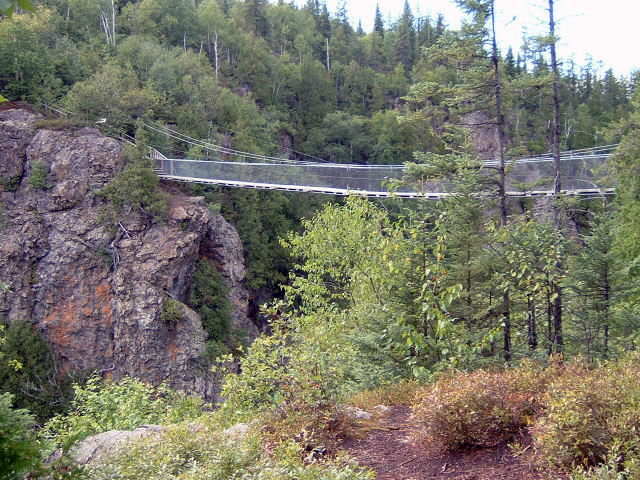
- Suspension Bridge over La Haie Lake

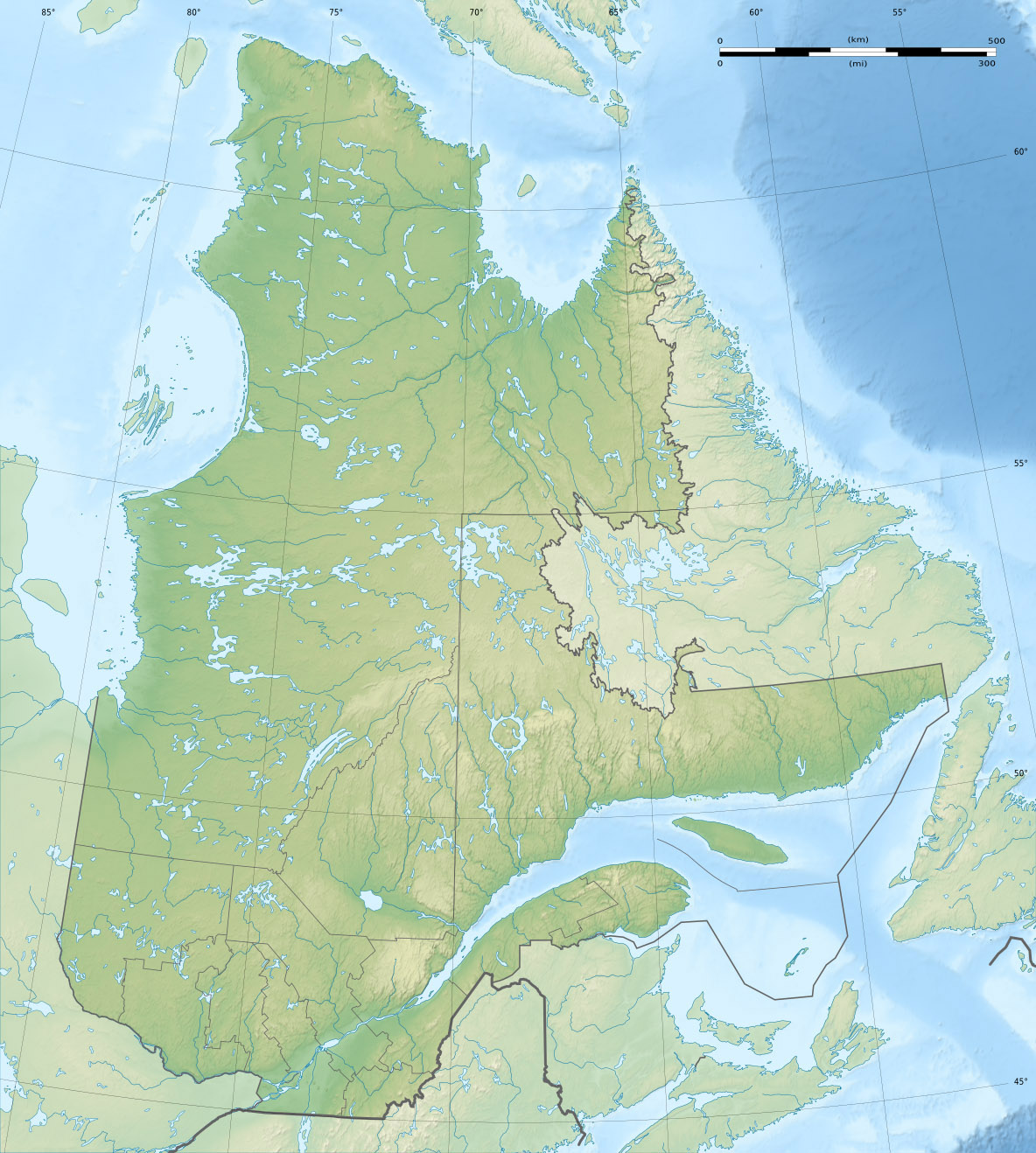
- Location within Quebec Location within Canada
- Interactive map of Aiguebelle National Park
- Location: Quebec, Canada
- Nearest city: Rouyn-Noranda
- Coordinates: 48.51044°N 78.74897°W
- Area: 268.3 km^{2} (103.6 sq mi)
- Established: 2 February 1985
- Visitors: 34,400 (in 2005)
- Governing body: SEPAQ
- Website: WDPA: 23123

Aiguebelle National Park (French: Parc national d'Aiguebelle, pronounced [paʁk nɑsjɔnal dɛɡbɛl]) is a provincial park in Quebec, Canada. It is located in western Quebec in the Abitibi-Témiscamingue region some 50 km north-east of Rouyn-Noranda, 50 km west of Amos, Quebec, 100 km north west of Val-d'Or, Quebec, and about 50 km due west of Lake Hebecourt. The park has a surface area of 268,3 km^{2}.

Its mission is to protect a representative sample of the clay belt of the Abitibi-Témiscamingue region and the Abijévis hills.

The park includes a watershed line and thus extends over two watersheds: the basin of the Hudson Bay and that of the Atlantic. There are traces of ancient volcanic activity and several lakes on the faults. It is managed by the Quebec government by the Société des établissements de plein air du Québec (Society of outdoor facilities in Quebec) (SÉPAQ).

== Geography ==
The park contains among other features the Abijévis hills, including Mount Dominant which is the highest summit of Abitibi (570m). The hills cover about two-thirds of the park. There is a fault that runs through much of the territory from Lake Lois to Lake La Haie.

The park is located on old geological formations of more than 2.7 billion years making it very much pre-Cambrian. It is composed mainly of pillow basalt formations that were formed at the bottom of the ocean. These formations are part of the larger group of Kinojévis in Superior Craton.

=== Hydrography ===
The park is situated on the borderline between the watersheds of Hudson Bay and the Atlantic Ocean. This line from the northwest corner to the middle of the eastern border. Nearly three quarters of the water is drained into the Saint Lawrence river. There are more than 80 lakes. The principal lakes are Aiguebelle and Lake Lois to the north, and Lake Sault and Lake La Haie located in the area of faults. There is also Lake Matissard lake on the southern edge of the park. The Kinojévis river passes near this latter lake.

== History ==
It was in 1945 that the Government of Quebec found, following the settlement of the Abitibi-Témiscamingue region, a lack of space for wildlife in the region. It thus chose the canton of Aiguebelle to create a reserve for hunting and fishing because of the poor quality of the land in that area. In 1976, it opened up camping and hiking trails in the area. In 1980 the status of the reserve was changed to a wildlife reserve. In 1985, this reserve was divided into two to create the Conservation Park of Aiguebelle with an area of 241.7 km^{2}. Following public consultation in 1998, the wildlife reserve was abolished, and the park was expanded to its current area. It was only in 2001 that the status of the park was changed to a national park, following an amendment to the Parks Act.

The name of the park is the name of the canton, which commemorates Charles Névair Aiguebelle, the captain of grenadiers of the Regiment of Languedoc, who distinguished himself by his bravery during the Battle of Sainte-Foy on 28 April 1760. The name of the canton is a continuation of the theme of the French military of the Seven Years' War in America which prevails in Abitibi.

== Natural heritage ==
=== Flora ===
The park is located in the Boreal forest of Canada which is also known as taiga. There are several common tree species such as white birch, black spruce, balsam poplar, American aspen, jack pine, American Larch, and balsam fir. Also found in the park are lowland species of the Saint Lawrence and the Great Lakes, such as yellow birch, black ash, and Eastern white pine.

=== Fauna ===
The Aiguebelle National Park features 55 species of mammals from Abitibi-Témiscamingue, including the moose (Alces alces), the North American beaver (Castor canadensis), the grey wolf (Canis lupus), the Canada lynx (Lynx canadensis), the muskrat (Ondatra zibethicus), the North American river otter (Lontra canadensis), the American mink (Mustela vison), the least weasel (Mustela nivalis), the American black bear (Ursus americanus), the North American porcupine (Erethizon dorsatum), and the American marten (Martes americana). The birdlife of the park has 150 species of birds including twenty species of New World warblers.

The lakes on the plains are dominated by walleye and northern pike. For the lakes in the Abijévis hills, there are lake trout (Salvelinus namaycush) and brook trout (Salvelinus fontinalis).

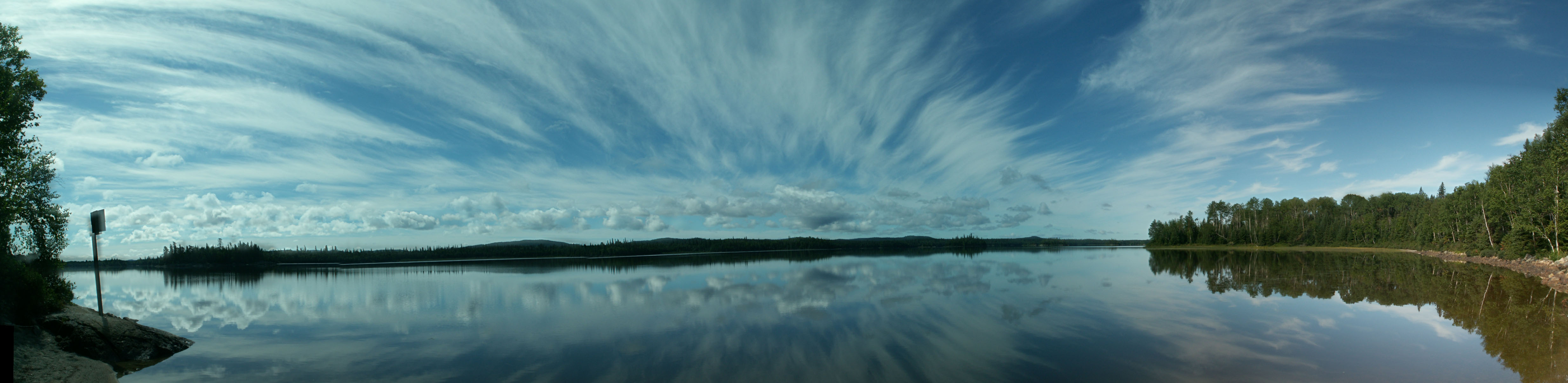
Panoramic View of Lake Loïs
