= Plaisance National Park =

National park of Quebec, Canada

- IUCN category II (national park)
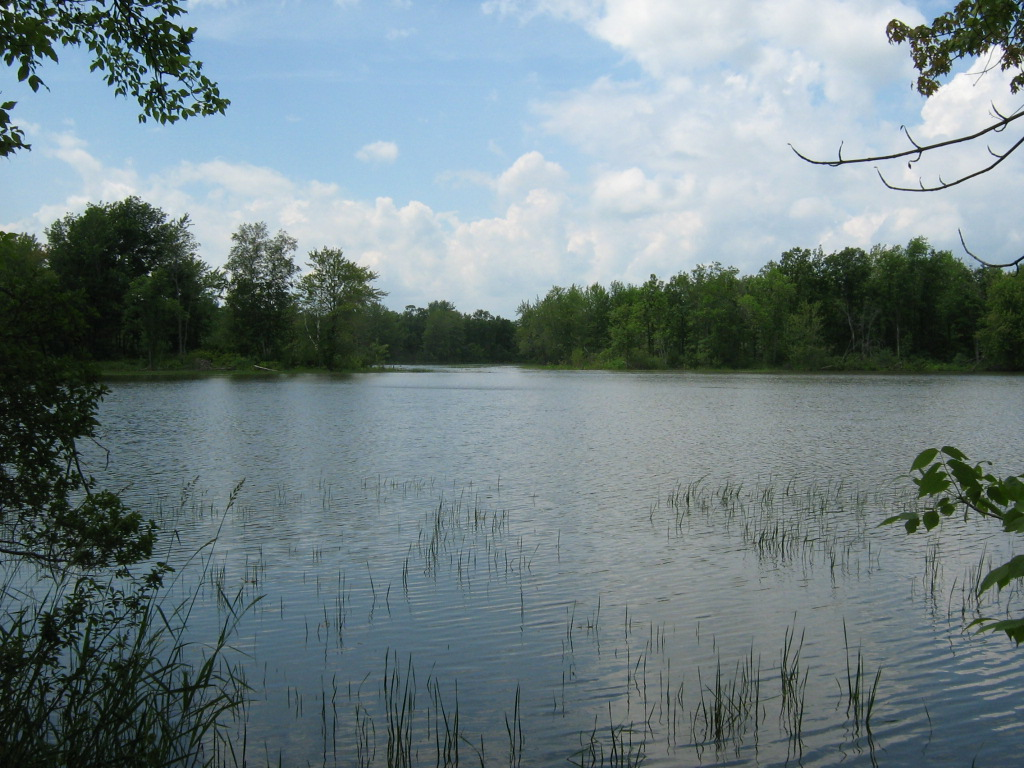

- Location within Quebec
- Interactive map of Plaisance National Park
- Location: Plaisance, Papineau Regional County Municipality, Québec, Canada
- Coordinates: 45.6°N 75.1333°W
- Area: 28.3 km^{2} (10.9 sq mi)
- Established: 1885
- Governing body: Société des établissements de plein air du Québec (SÉPAQ)
- Website: https://www.sepaq.com/pq/pla/

Plaisance National Park (French: Parc national de Plaisance, pronounced [paʁk nɑsjɔnal də plɛzɑ̃s]) is a provincial park located near Plaisance in the province of Quebec, Canada. The park was established on March 22, 2002 and covers an area of 28.3 square kilometres (10.9 sq mi).
