= Pingualuit crater =

Impact crater in Quebec, Canada

Pingualuit Crater
- New Quebec Crater; Chubb Crater
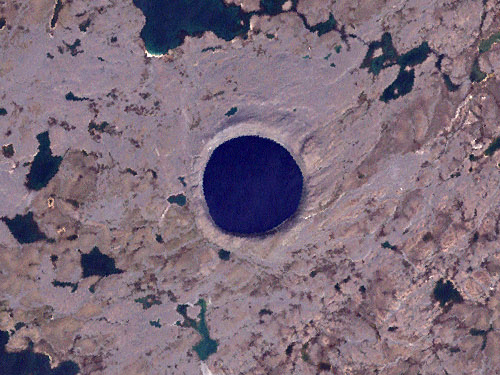
- Satellite image of Pingualuit Crater

- Location within Quebec
- Location: Kativik, Quebec, Nord-du-Québec, Quebec, Canada; 61°16′39″N 73°39′36″W

Impact crater structure
- Confidence: confirmed
- Diameter: 3.44 km (2.14 mi)
- Depth: 400 m (1,300 ft)
- Rise: 160 m (520 ft)
- Age: 1.4 ± 0.1 Ma
- Exposed: yes
- Drilled: yes
- Bolide type: Chondrite
- Translation: pimple (Inuit)

The Pingualuit Crater (French: Cratère des Pingualuit; from Inuktitut ᐱᖑᐊᓗᐃᑦ, "pimple"), formerly called the "Chubb Crater" and later the "New Quebec Crater" (French: Cratère du Nouveau-Québec), is a relatively young impact crater located on the Ungava Peninsula in the administrative region of Nord-du-Québec, in Quebec, Canada. It is 3.44 km (2.14 mi) in diameter, and is estimated to be 1.4 ± 0.1 million years old (Pleistocene). The crater and the surrounding area are now part of Pingualuit National Park. The only species of fish in the crater lake is the Arctic char.

== Geography ==
The crater is exposed to the surface, rising 160 m (520 ft) above the surrounding tundra, and is 400 m (1,300 ft) deep. The 267-metre-deep (876 ft) Pingualuk Lake fills the hollow, and is one of the deepest lakes in North America. The lake also holds some of the purest fresh water in the world, with a salinity level of less than 3 ppm (by comparison, the salinity level of the Great Lakes is 500 ppm). It is one of the most transparent lakes in the world, with a Secchi disk visible more than 35 m (115 ft) deep. The lake has no inlets or apparent outlets, so the water accumulates solely from rain and snow and is lost only through evaporation.

== Formation ==
The crater was formed by a meteorite impact 1.4 Ma, as estimated by ^{40}Ar/^{39}Ar dating of impact melt rocks, making the lake one of the oldest lakes in the world. An analysis of these rocks also revealed planar deformation features as well as the composition of the meteorite itself. Enrichments of iron, nickel, cobalt, and chromium found in impact melt samples suggest that the meteorite was chondritic in nature.

== Discovery and scientific study ==
Once largely unknown to the outside world, the lake-filled crater had long been known to local Inuit, who knew it as the "Crystal Eye of Nunavik" for its clear water. World War II pilots often used the almost perfectly circular landmark as a navigational aid.

On June 20, 1943, a United States Army Air Force plane on a meteorological flight over the Ungava region of Quebec Province took a photograph that showed the wide crater rim rising up above the landscape. In 1948, the Royal Canadian Air Force covered the same remote area as part of its program of photomapping Canada, though these photographs were not made publicly available until 1950. Ontario diamond prospector Frederick W. Chubb became interested by the strange terrain shown in the photographs and sought the opinion of geologist V. Ben Meen of the Royal Ontario Museum. Chubb hoped that the crater was that of an extinct volcano, in which case the area might contain diamond deposits similar to those of South Africa. However, Meen's knowledge of Canadian geology tentatively ruled out a volcanic origin. Meen subsequently made a brief trip by air to the crater with Chubb in 1950; it was on this trip that Meen proposed the name "Chubb Crater" for the circular feature and "Museum Lake" for the irregular body of water about 2 mi (3.2 km) north of the crater (now known as Laflamme Lake).

Following his return, Meen organized a proper expedition with the cooperation of the National Geographic Society and the Royal Ontario Museum. They travelled to the site in a PBY Catalina flying boat in July 1951, landing on nearby Museum Lake. Attempts to find fragments of nickel-iron from the meteorite using mine detectors lent by the US Army were unsuccessful due to the area's granite containing high levels of magnetite. A magnetometer survey did find a magnetic anomaly under the crater's northern rim, however, indicating that a large mass of metal-bearing material was buried below the surface. Meen led a second expedition to the crater in 1954. That same year its name was changed to "Cratère du Nouveau-Québec" ("New Quebec Crater") at the request of the Quebec Geographic Board.

An expedition led by James Boulger in 1986 collected a small rock sample from the area surrounding the New Quebec Crater. Petrographic analysis of this sample was conducted at the Harvard – Smithsonian Center for Astrophysics and reported to the 51st Meteoritical Society in 1988 by Ursula Marvin and David Kring. Boulger returned to the area that summer, along with a research party led by M. A. Bouchard of the University of Montreal. Three years later Canadian geologist Richard A. F. Grieve listed New Quebec among the 130 known terrestrial impact craters. In 1992, Marvin and Kring documented the petrographic analysis of two impact melt samples collected within the crater rim. They presented evidence of shock metamorphism, which is consistent with similar impact crater sites. In 1999, the name was again changed, to "Pingualuit". The crater and the surrounding area are now part of Quebec's Pingualuit National Park, created on January 1, 2004.

=== 2007 expedition ===
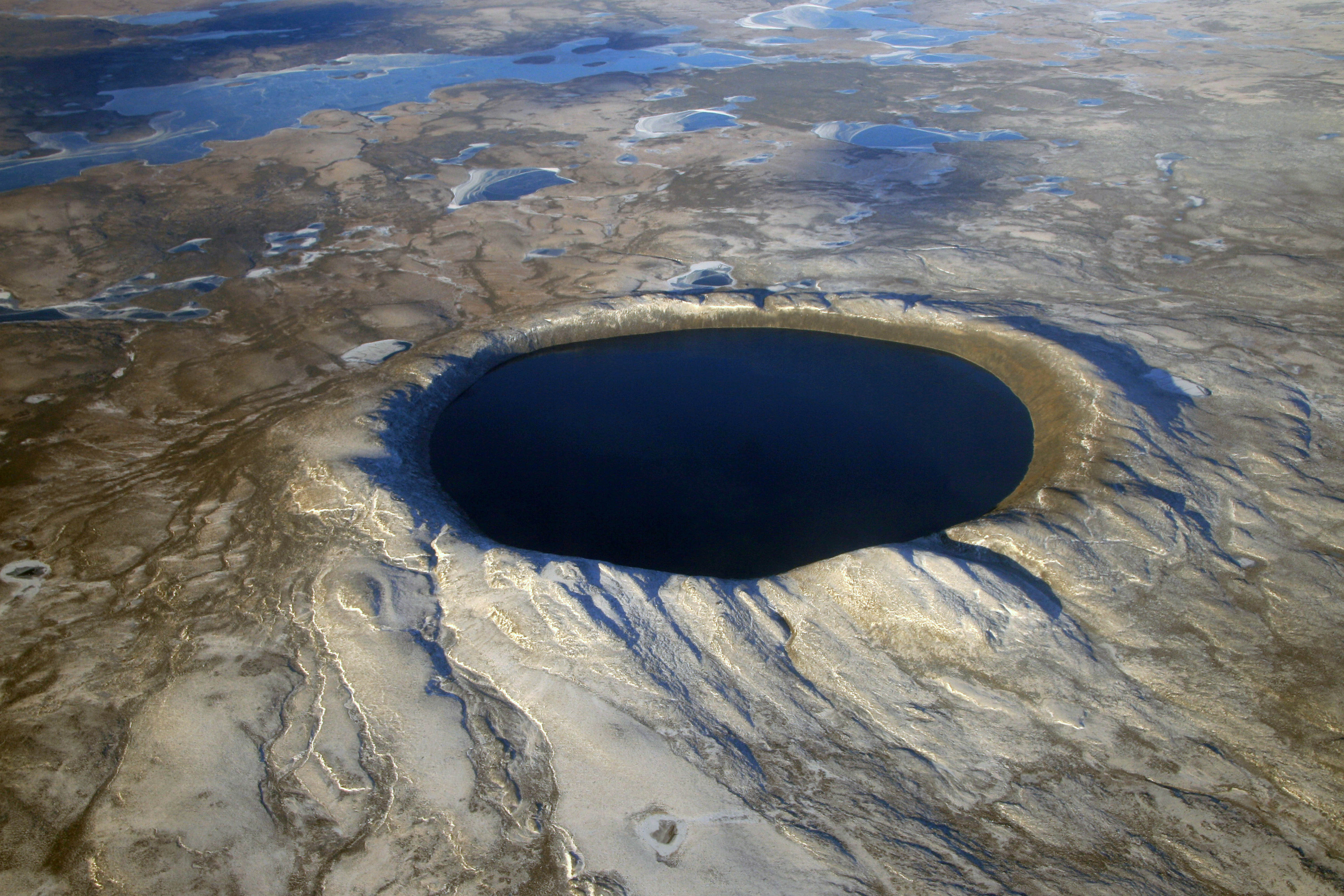
Pingualuit Crater, October 2007

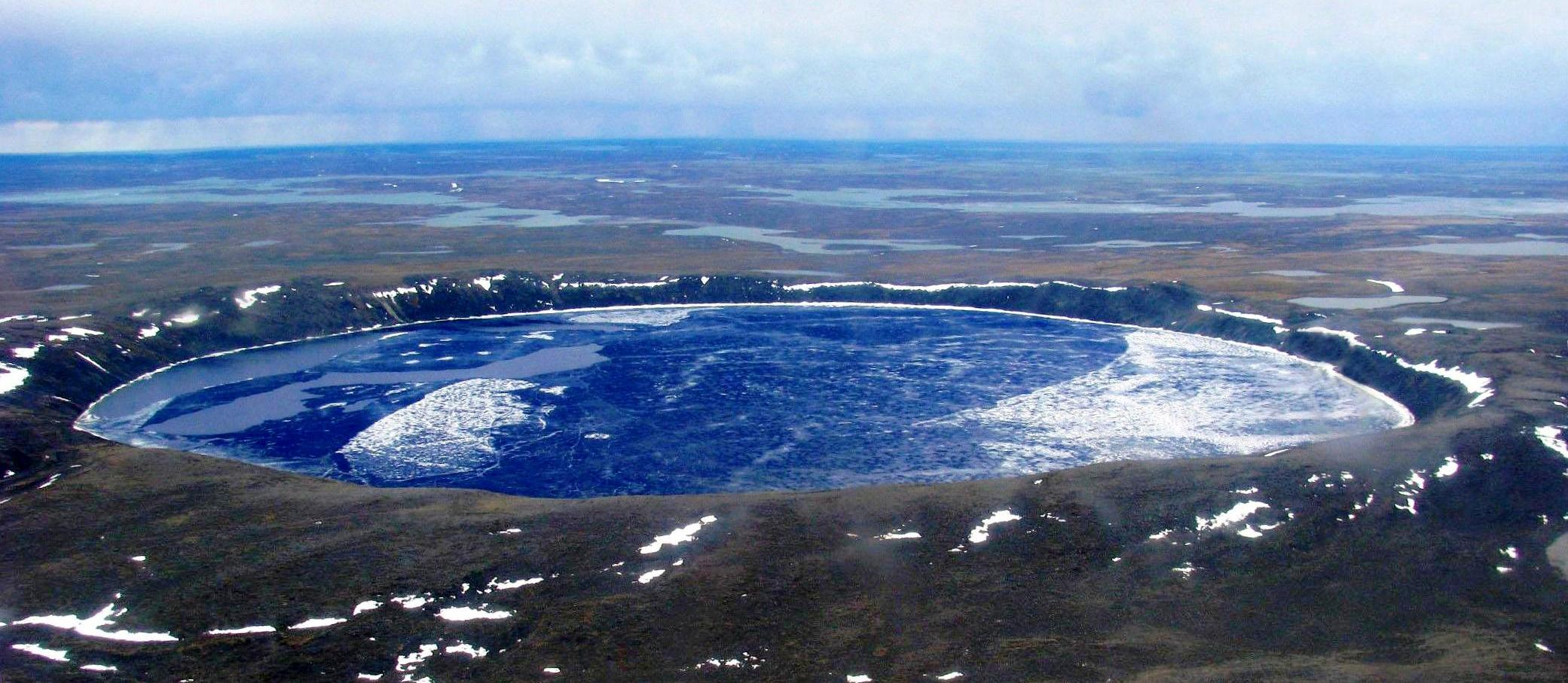

Professor Reinhard Pienitz of Laval University led a 2007 expedition to the crater. Sediment cores were extracted from the bottom of the lake, which were filled with fossil pollen, algae, and insect larvae. It was hoped that these finds would yield information about the climate dating back to the last interglacial period 120,000 years ago. Preliminary results show that the upper 8.5 m (28 ft) sediment core contains records of two interglacial periods.
