= Assinica National Park Reserve =

Natural Reserve of Center-West of Quebec, Canada

- French: Réserve du parc national Assinica
- IUCN category II (national park)
- Location within Quebec
- Interactive map of Assinica National Park Reserve
- Location: Canada; Quebec; Jamésie
- Nearest city: Oujé-Bougoumou
- Coordinates: 50.314294°N 74.9793°W
- Area: 3,193 kilometres (1,984.04 mi)
- Established: Creation of the Reserve as of 17
- Administrator: Ministère des Forêts, de la Faune et des Parcs

The Assinica National Park Reserve (French: Réserve du parc national Assinica) is a protected area located in west-central Quebec, Canada. This 3,193 kilometres (1,984.04 mi) territory, set aside in 2011, aims to protect one of the most important habitats of endangered species such as woodland caribou, forest ecotype, as well as the bald eagle in the wildlife. Regarding the flora, two species likely to be threatened or vulnerable were observed in this reserve: the hudsonia tomentosa and the arethusa bulbosa.

== See also ==
- National Parks of Quebec
- Oujé-Bougoumou
- Jamésie
