= Ulittaniujalik National Park =

National park in Nunavik, Quebec, Canada

- IUCN category II (national park)
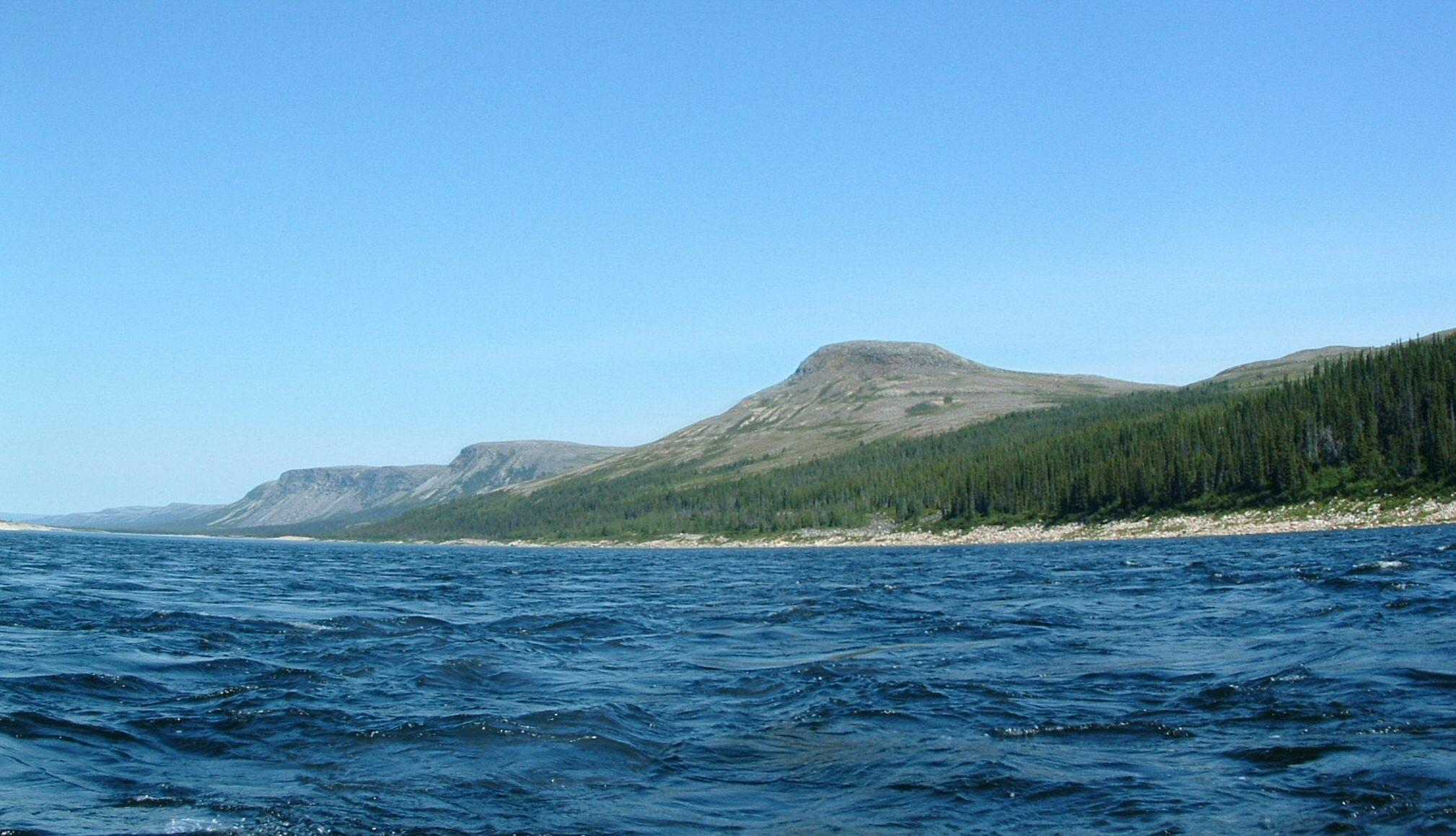

- Location within Quebec Location within Canada
- Interactive map of Ulittaniujalik National Park
- Nearest city: Kangiqsualujjuaq
- Coordinates: 57°37′37″N 65°25′55″W
- Area: 5,293.1 km^{2} (2,043.7 sq mi)
- Established: 10 March, 2016
- Website: https://www.nunavikparks.ca/en/parks/ulittaniujalik

Ulittaniujalik National Park (French: parc national Ulittaniujalik) is a 5,293.1 km^{2} (2,043.7 sq mi) national park, created on 10 March 2016 in Nunavik, Quebec, Canada. It was created in partnership with the Inuit communities of Kangiqsualujjuaq and Kuujjuaq, in addition to the Naskapi community of Kawawachikamach. It contains the Pic Pyramide (Pyramid Peak), which is at an altitude of 457 m (1,499 ft).

== Flora and fauna ==
The landscapes vary greatly. In the George River valley, there are forests of spruce and larch, and even birch and balsam poplar, which are usually present at lower latitudes. The park protects the George River caribou herd, whose population has dramatically decreased over recent decades.
