= Deux-Montagnes Regional County Municipality =

Deux-Montagnes
- Regional county municipality
- Location in province of Quebec.
- Coordinates: 45°28′N 74°06′W
- Country: Canada
- Province: Quebec
- Region: Laurentides
- Effective: January 1, 1983
- County seat: Saint-Eustache

Government
  - Type: Prefecture
  - Prefect: Marc Lauzon

Area
  - Total: 294.10 km^{2} (113.55 sq mi)
  - Land: 242.88 km^{2} (93.78 sq mi)

Population (2021)
  - Total: 102,052
  - Density: 420.2/km^{2} (1,088/sq mi)
  - Change 2016-2021: ▲3.9%
  - Dwellings: 41,454
- Time zone: UTC−5 (EST)
  - Summer (DST): UTC−4 (EDT)
- Area codes: 450 and 579
- Website: www.mrc2m.qc.ca

Deux-Montagnes (French pronunciation: [dø mɔ̃taɲ]) is a regional county municipality in the Laurentides region of Quebec, Canada. It is located immediately north of Laval on the north shore of the Rivière des Mille-Îles and on the north shore of the Lake of Two Mountains. Its seat and largest city is Saint-Eustache.

The municipality has a land area of 242.88 km^{2} (93.78 sq mi) and its population was 102,052 residents as of the 2021 Census.

== Subdivisions ==
There are 7 subdivisions and one native reserve within the RCM:

Cities & Towns (3)

- Deux-Montagnes
- Sainte-Marthe-sur-le-Lac
- Saint-Eustache

Municipalities (4)

- Oka
- Pointe-Calumet
- Saint-Joseph-du-Lac
- Saint-Placide

Native Reserves (1)
(not associated with RCM)

- Kanesatake Mohawk Reserve

== Demographics ==
=== Population ===
Canada census – Deux-Montagnes community profile

	2021	2016	2011
Population	102,052 (+3.9% from 2016)	98,203 (+2.6% from 2011)	95,670 (+9.6% from 2006)
Land area	242.88 km^{2} (93.78 sq mi)	243.42 km^{2} (93.98 sq mi)	243.39 km^{2} (93.97 sq mi)
Population density	420.2/km^{2} (1,088/sq mi)	403.4/km^{2} (1,045/sq mi)	393.1/km^{2} (1,018/sq mi)
Median age	42.4 (M: 41.6, F: 43.2)	41.1 (M: 40.3, F: 41.9)	39.8 (M: 38.8, F: 40.7)
Private dwellings	42,552 (total) 41,454 (occupied)	40,728 (total)	39,100 (total)
Median household income	$85,000	$71,086	$63,075

References: 2021 2016 2011

Historical Census Data - Deux-Montagnes Regional County Municipality, Quebec

Year	Pop.	±%
1991	71,218	—
1996	78,960	+10.9%
2001	81,417	+3.1%
2006	87,249	+7.2%

Year	Pop.	±%
2006A	87,264	+0.0%
2011	95,670	+9.6%
2016	98,203	+2.6%
2021	102,052	+3.9%

(A) adjustment due to boundary change.

=== Language ===
Canada Census Mother Tongue - Deux-Montagnes Regional County Municipality, Quebec
Census	Total	French			English			French & English			Other		
Year	Responses	Count	Trend	Pop %	Count	Trend	Pop %	Count	Trend	Pop %	Count	Trend	Pop %
2021	101,660	84,690	▼0.5%	83.3%	5,620	▲1.8%	5.53%	1,685	▲50.58%	1.66%	8.135	▲30.68%	8%
2016	97,960	85,125	▲1.3%	86.9%	5,520	▼6.5%	5.6%	1,090	▲20.4%	1.1%	6,225	▲63.4%	6.4%
2011	94,620	84,000	▲8.4%	88.78%	5,905	▲3.3%	6.24%	905	▲28.4%	0.96%	3,810	▲42.7%	4.03%
2006	86,570	77,480	▲6.3%	89.50%	5,715	▲1.9%	6.60%	705	▼9.0%	0.81%	2,670	▲72.8%	3.08%
2001	80,810	72,880	▲4.2%	90.19%	5,610	▼8.9%	6.94%	775	▲2.6%	0.96%	1,545	▲8.8%	1.91%
1996	78,280	69,945	n/a	89.35%	6,160	n/a	7.87%	755	n/a	0.96%	1,420	n/a	1.81%

== Transportation ==
=== Access Routes ===
Highways and numbered routes that run through the municipality, including external routes that start or finish at the county border:

- Autoroutes
  - A-640
- Principal Highways
  - R-148
- Secondary Highways
  - R-344
- External Routes
  - None

== See also ==
- List of regional county municipalities and equivalent territories in Quebec
- CIT Laurentides
- Deux-Montagnes (AMT)
