= Société des établissements de plein air du Québec =

Government agency of Canada

Sépaq
- Société des établissements de plein air du Québec

Agency overview
- Jurisdiction: Government of Quebec
- Headquarters: Quebec City, Quebec, Canada
- Minister responsible: Minister of Développement durable, de l'Environnement et des Parcs (Sustainable development, Environment and Parks)
- Website: www.sepaq.com

The Société des établissements de plein air du Québec (French pronunciation: [sɔsjete dez‿etablismɑ̃ də plɛn‿ɛʁ dy kebɛk], Quebec Outdoor Establishments Company), also known as Sépaq, is the agency of the Government of Quebec that manages public parks and wildlife reserves. The Sépaq falls under the authority of the Minister of Développement durable, de l'Environnement et des Parcs (Sustainable development, Environment and Parks) and its head office is located in Quebec City. It employs about 3400 people.

== History ==
On 29 November 1984, the union that represents provincial civil servants of Quebec published an ad in La Presse condemning the government's plan to create the Sépaq, stating that it would penalize existing employees and the general population.

== Structure ==
The total surface area under management by Sépaq as parks or reserves is over 80,000 square kilometres (31,000 sq mi). Sépaq is organized into 3 divisions called "networks":

1. Parcs Québec – manages 28 provincial parks ("national" parks, as they are called in Quebec) that are officially recognized as protected areas. Parcs Québec works to ensure the protection and preservation of these significant ecosystems, where low-impact activities such as hiking, canoeing and camping are preferred while protecting sensitive zones and keeping environmental impacts to a minimum.
2. Réserves fauniques (Wildlife reserves) – manages 15 wildlife reserves in forested and wilderness areas. These areas are dedicated to the conservation, promotion, and use of wildlife resources, and, secondarily, to the practice of outdoor recreational activities. They are not considered protected areas under the criteria of the IUCN.
3. Centres touristique (Tourist centres) – manages 9 tourist resorts. This network preserves and promotes certain historical sites and tourism facilities.

Sépaq also manages 4,213 square kilometres (1,627 sq mi) of Anticosti Island as a separate division not part of the other networks. Sépaq Anticosti promotes tourism on the island, particularly hunting and fishing tours.

== See also ==
- List of protected areas of Quebec – list of national parks and reserves in Quebec, including those under management by Sépaq
- Ontario Parks
- Parks Canada
