= Kativik Regional Government =

Administrative region in Quebec

Coordinates: 58°36′10″N 70°57′55.7″W

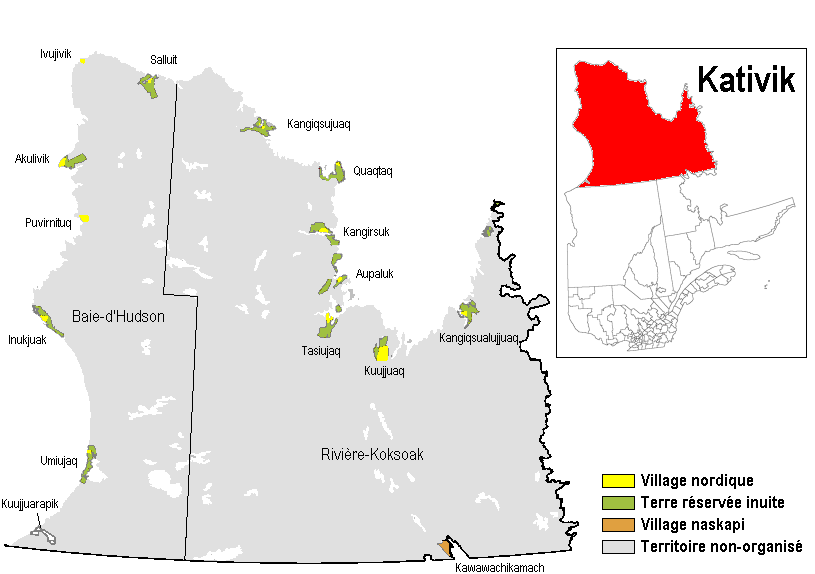
Territory of the Kativik Regional Government, Quebec

The Kativik Regional Government (French: Administration régionale Kativik, ARK) is the representative regional authority for most of the Nunavik region of Quebec. Nunavik is the northern half of the Nord-du-Québec administrative region and includes all the territory north of the 55th parallel. The administrative capital is Kuujjuaq, on the Koksoak River, about 50 kilometres inland from the southern end of the Ungava Bay.

In accordance with the 1975 James Bay and Northern Quebec Agreement, the KRG was established by the 1978 Act respecting Northern Villages and the Kativik Regional Government (Kativik Act).

== Representation ==
The Kativik Regional Government includes 14 northern villages, 14 Inuit reserved lands and one Naskapi village municipality. Each Inuit reserved land is near a northern village; the Naskapi village municipality of Kawawachikamach (north of the 55th parallel) is near the Naskapi reserved land that is also called Kawawachikamach, south of the 55th parallel in the Côte-Nord region of Quebec. The Kativik Regional Government covers a territory of about 500,000 km^{2} (190,000 sq mi) and includes a population of just over 10,000 persons, of which about 90% are Inuit.

The Cree village Whapmagoostui, near the northern village of Kuujjuarapik, on the eastern shore of Hudson Bay, is an enclave in the Nunavik region and its inhabitants do not participate in the Kativik Regional Government. Whapmagoostui (village and reserved lands: 316 km^{2}, 122 sq mi) is part of the Cree Regional Authority and the Grand Council of the Cree (Eeyou Istchee).

The Inuit of Nunavik are also represented by the Makivik Corporation in their relations with the governments of Quebec and Canada on issues specifically pertaining to their indigenous rights (hunting and land use). The Makivik Corporation supports greater autonomy for the Nunavik region and is headquartered in Kuujjuaq.

== Structure ==
Each of the 14 municipal councils of the northern villages designates one of its elected members to serve as a regional councillor on the Kativik Regional Government. As such, all these councillors have been elected locally by municipal residents, whether Inuit and non-Inuit. An additional regional councillor is designated as a representative from Kawawachikamach, Quebec.

== Finances ==
The Regional Government is financed by the Government of Quebec (50%) and the Government of Canada (25%).

== Education ==
The public school system is Kativik Ilisarniliriniq.

== Services ==
The KRG has mandates to provide the following services:

- Airport and marine infrastructure maintenance
- Economic and business development
- Policing, civil security and assistance to victims of crime
- Inuit hunting, fishing and trapping support and wildlife conservation
- Environmental research
- Parks management
- Employment, training and income support
- Childcare services
- Municipal infrastructure development and drinking water monitoring
- Internet access
- Sports and recreation

The police services are provided by the Nunavik Police Service, which has its headquarters in Kuujjuaq.
