= Quebec Route 315 =

Highway in Quebec, Canada

Coordinates: 45.73686°N 75.07233°W

Route 315

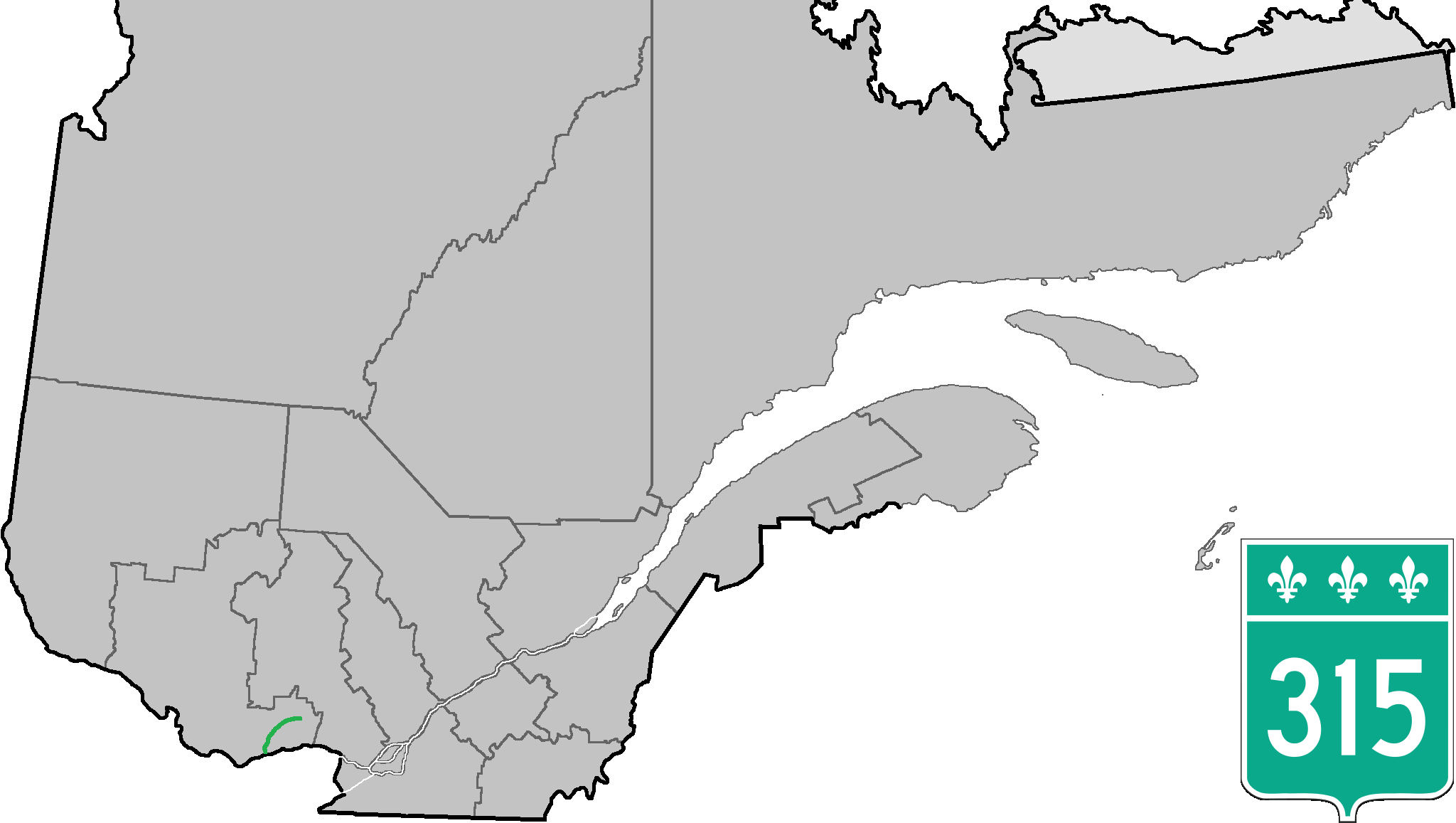

Route information
- Maintained by Transports Québec
- Length: 76.6 km (47.6 mi)

Major junctions
- South end: R-148 in Gatineau (Masson-Angers)
- A-50 in Gatineau (Masson-Angers); R-309 in Gatineau (Buckingham); R-321 in Chénéville
- North end: R-323 in Namur

Location
- Country: Canada
- Province: Quebec
- Major cities: Gatineau

Highway system
- Quebec provincial highways; Autoroutes; List; Former
| ← R-311 | → R-317 |

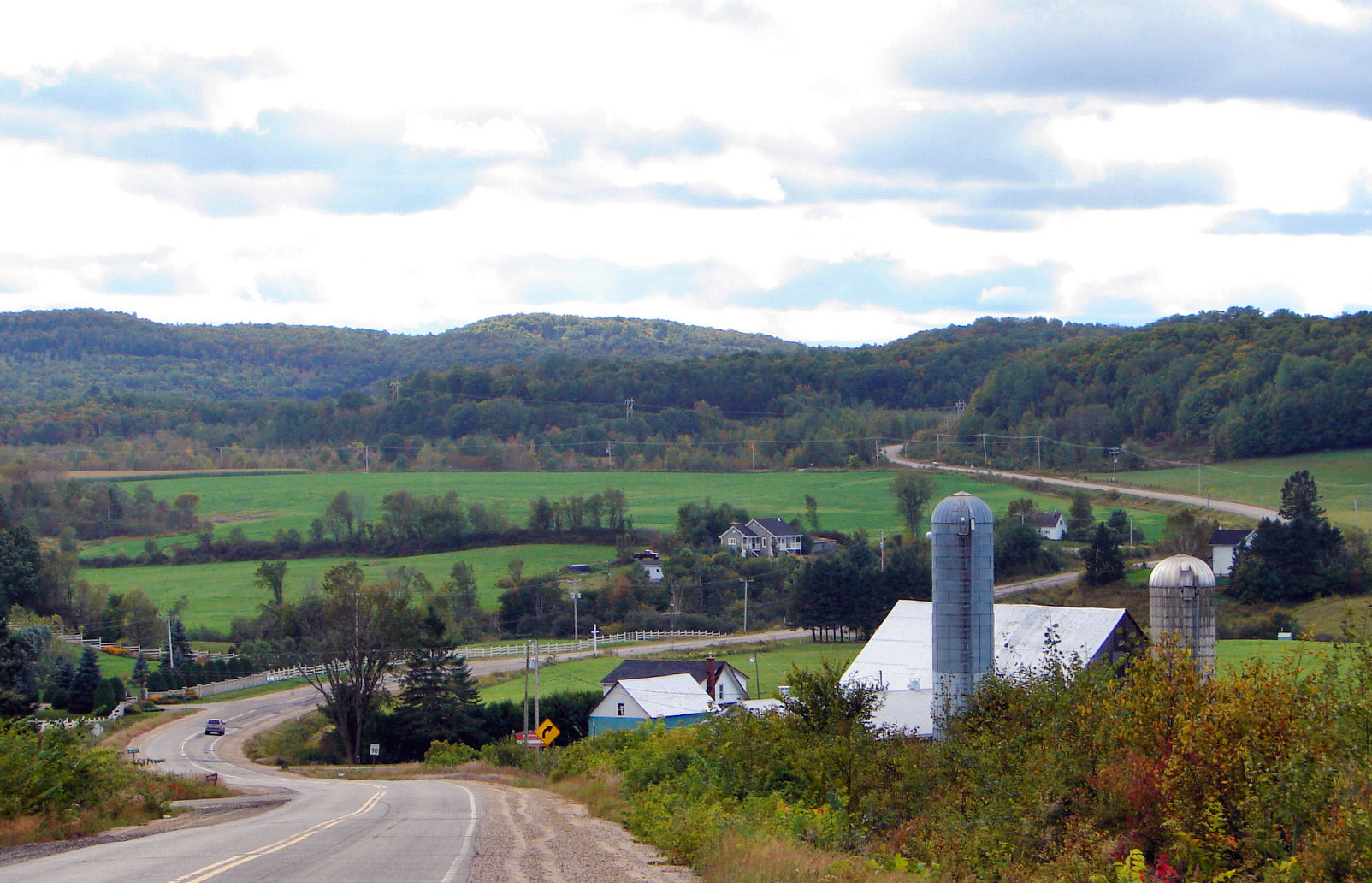
Route 315 through Chénéville.

Route 315 is a road in the Canadian province of Quebec that connects the Gatineau sector of Masson-Angers to Namur. Initially, the road started in Buckingham on Rue Joseph at the city's Main Street (Avenue de Buckingham) just a few kilometres further north, but when A-50 was extended further east as a Buckingham by-pass at its current end at Doherty Road, the section of Route 309 between Buckingham and the junction at Route 148 in Masson-Angers was renumbered Route 315 while Route 309 starts at Doherty Road and A-50.

The section of Route 315 between Mulgrave-et-Derry and Ripon is unpaved and windy.

== Municipalities along Route 315 ==
- Gatineau - (Masson-Angers / Buckingham)
- Mayo
- Mulgrave-et-Derry
- Ripon
- Montpellier
- Lac-Simon
- Chénéville
- Namur

== Major intersections ==
| RCM or ET | Municipality | km | Junction | Notes |
|---|---|---|---|---|
Southern terminus of Route 315
| Gatineau | Masson-Angers | 0.0 | R-148 | 148 WEST: to Gatineau; 148 EAST: to Lochaber-Partie-Ouest |
| Gatineau | Masson-Angers | 0.6; 1.9 | A-50 | 50 EAST: to Buckingham; 50 WEST: to Gatineau |
| Gatineau | Buckingham | 8.2 | R-309 | 309 SOUTH: to A-50; 309 NORTH: to L'Ange-Gardien |
| Papineau | Ripon | 48.7 | Chemin Montpellier | EAST: to R-317 |
| Papineau | Chénéville | 65.1 | R-321 | 321 SOUTH: to Ripon; 321 NORTH: to Duhamel |
| Papineau | Namur | 76.6 | R-323 | 323 SOUTH: to Notre-Dame-de-la-Paix; 323 NORTH: to Saint-Émile-de-Suffolk |
Northern terminus of Route 315

== See also ==
- List of Quebec provincial highways
