= Namur, Quebec =

Namur
- Municipality
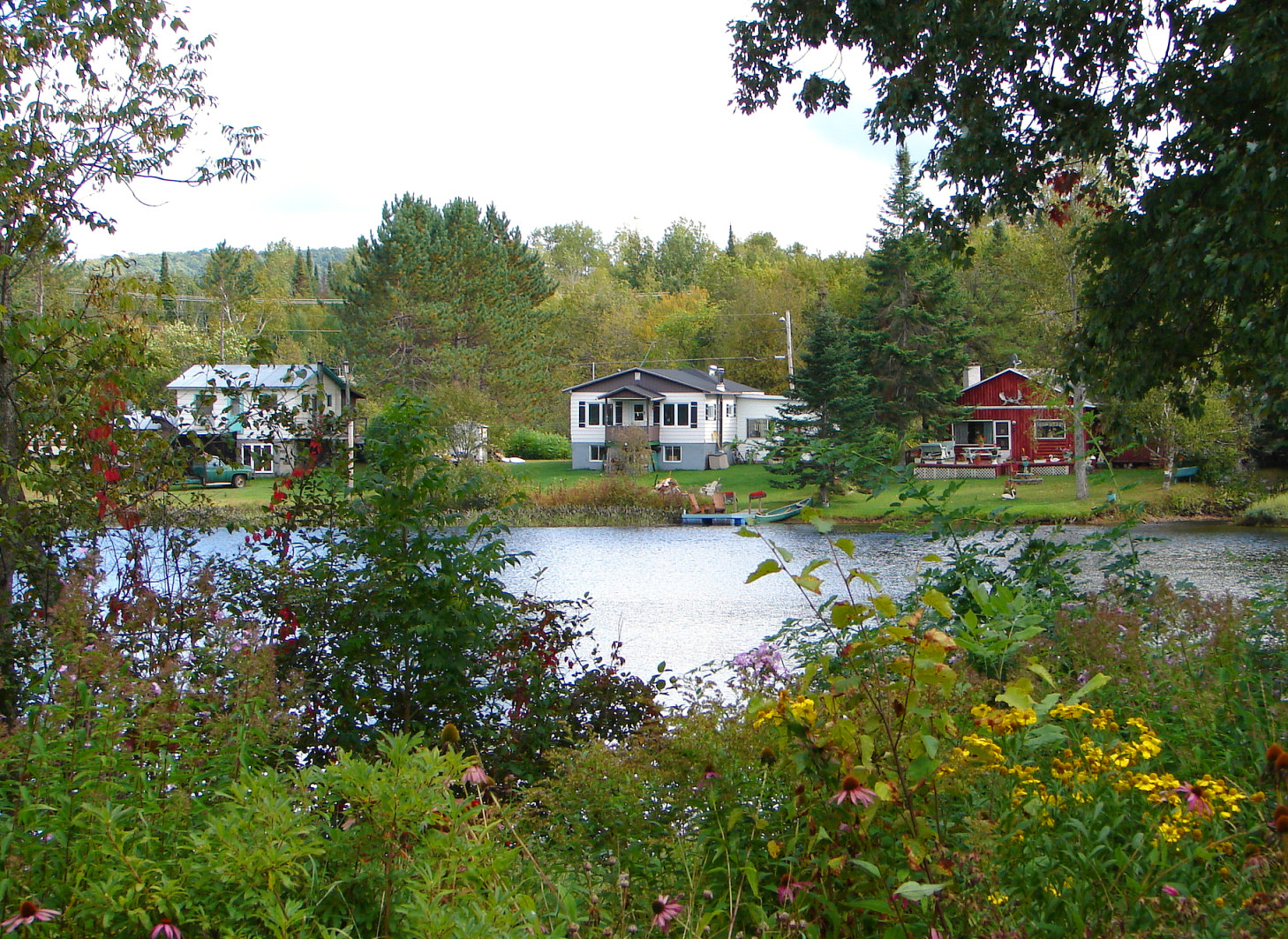
- Lake in Namur

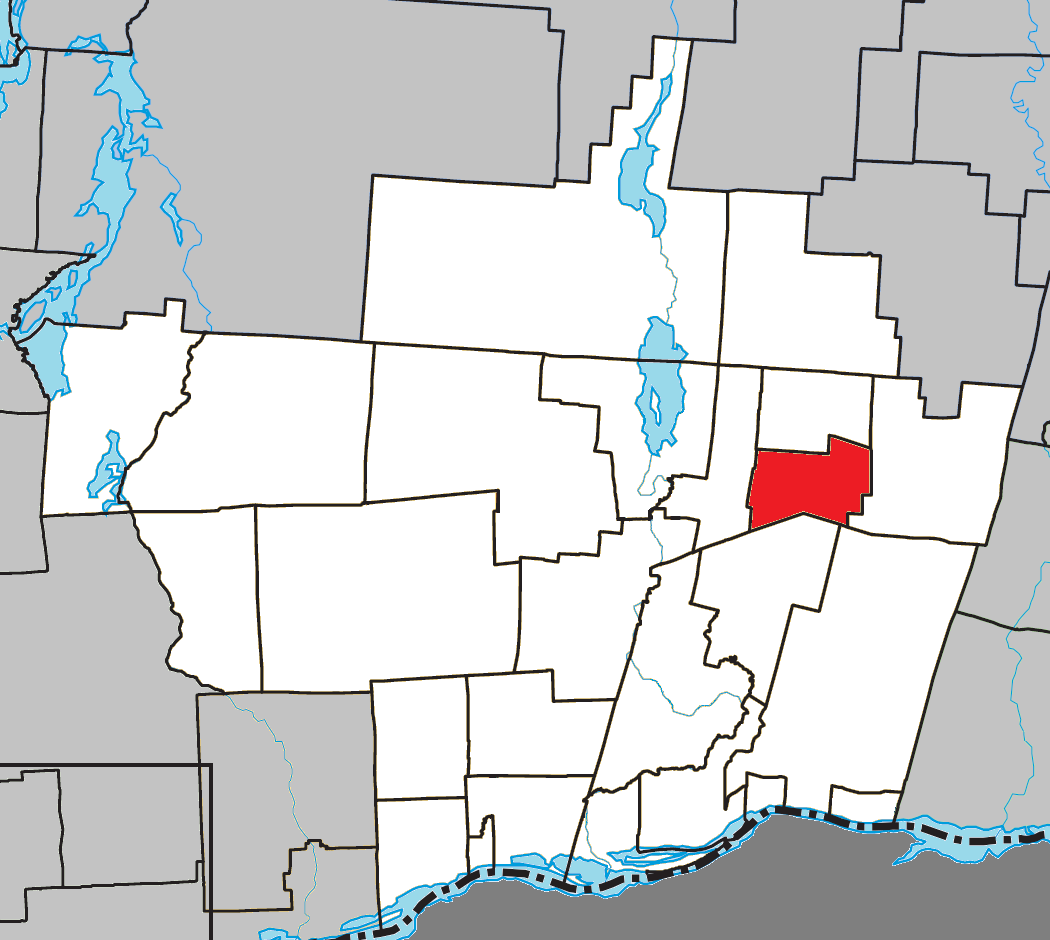
- Location within Papineau RCM

- Location in western Quebec
- Coordinates: 45°54′N 74°56′W
- Country: Canada
- Province: Quebec
- Region: Outaouais
- RCM: Papineau
- Settled: 1865
- Constituted: January 1, 1964

Government
  - Mayor: Gilbert Dardel
  - Federal riding: Argenteuil—La Petite-Nation
  - Prov. riding: Papineau

Area
  - Total: 58.10 km^{2} (22.43 sq mi)
  - Land: 56.17 km^{2} (21.69 sq mi)

Population (2021)
  - Total: 633
  - Density: 11.3/km^{2} (29/sq mi)
  - Pop 2016-2021: ▲10.7%
  - Dwellings: 381
- Time zone: UTC−5 (EST)
  - Summer (DST): UTC−4 (EDT)
- Postal code(s): J0V 1N0
- Area code: 819
- Highways: R-315; R-323
- Website: www.namur.ca

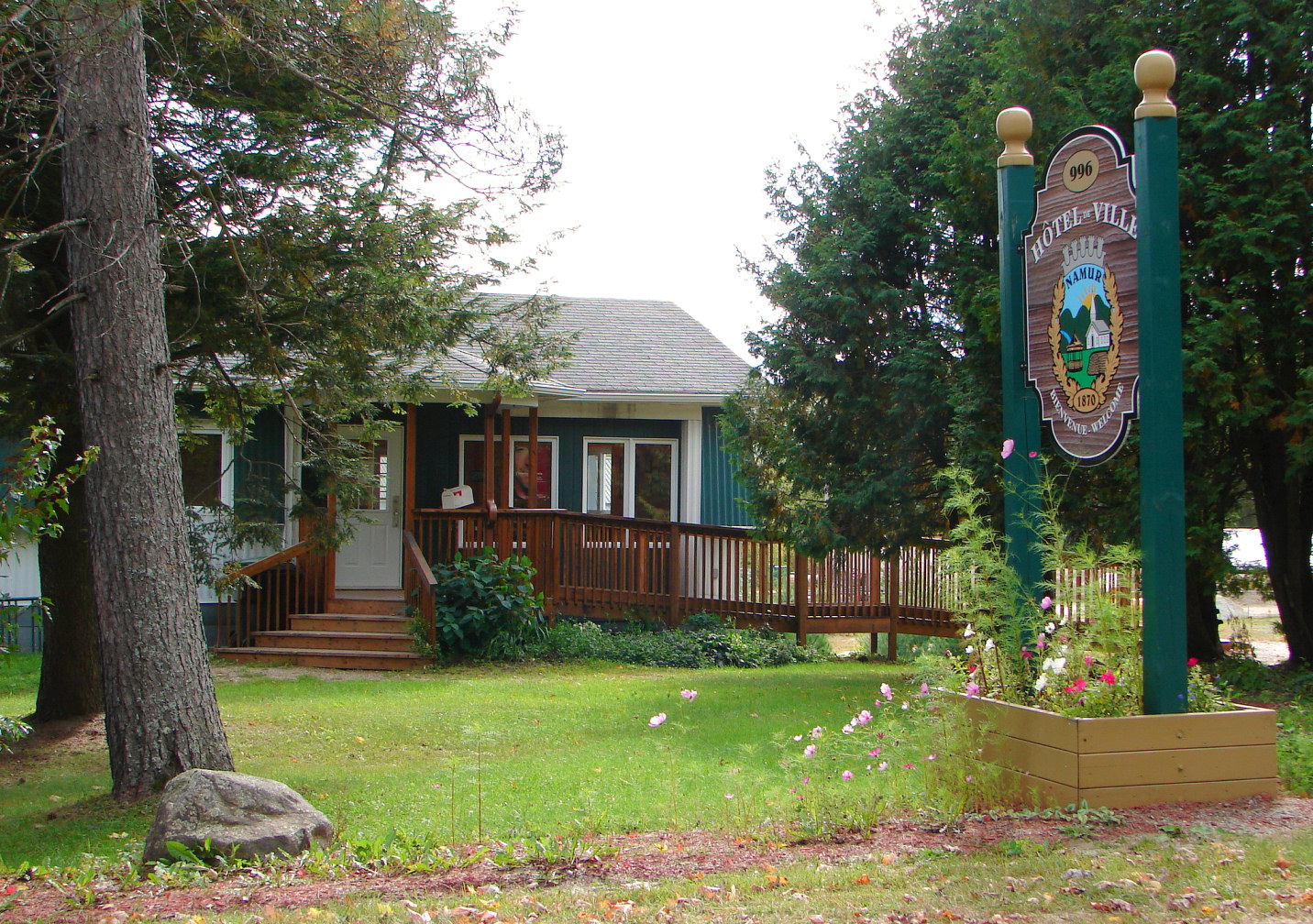
Namur town hall

Namur (French pronunciation: [namyʁ]) is a town and municipality in the Outaouais region of Quebec, Canada, part of the Papineau Regional County Municipality. It is nicknamed "la Nouvelle Belgique" (New Belgium).

The vast majority of the local population lives off the timber industry, which is marked by the Loggers Summer Festival. Furthermore, the area's excellent fishing and hunting opportunities attract many tourists annually.

== History ==
The first settlers arrived in the area in 1865, the majority originating from the Belgian Province of Namur and mostly Presbyterian Walloons; their family names were Edain, Frison, Pinon, Roquet, Fluhamann, and Van Vanious. In 1874, the Namur Post Office opened.

From 1886 onward, the area was known as the United Township Municipality of Suffolk-et-Addington. Piece by piece, portions of this united township were detached to form new municipalities: Vinoy in 1920 (since 1996 part of Chénéville), Lac-des-Plages in 1950, and finally Namur in 1964.

== Demographics ==
Canada census – Namur community profile

	2021	2016	2011
Population	633 (+10.7% from 2016)	572 (-4.0% from 2011)	596 (22.4% from 2006)
Land area	56.17 km^{2} (21.69 sq mi)	56.76 km^{2} (21.92 sq mi)	56.37 km^{2} (21.76 sq mi)
Population density	11.3/km^{2} (29/sq mi)	10.1/km^{2} (26/sq mi)	10.6/km^{2} (27/sq mi)
Median age	53.6 (M: 53.6, F: 53.2)	54.2 (M: 55.0, F: 53.6)	48.3 (M: 47.9, F: 48.6)
Private dwellings	295 (total)	389 (total)	348 (total)
Median household income	$48,000	$40,235	$29,784

References: 2021 2016 2011

Historical census populations – Namur, Quebec
Year	Pop.	±%
1986	479	—
1991	512	+6.9%
1996	543	+6.1%
2001	532	−2.0%
2006	487	−8.5%
2011	596	+22.4%
2016	572	−4.0%
2021	633	+10.7%
Source: Statistics Canada

Mother tongue:

- English as first language: 8.8%
- French as first language: 89.6%
- English and French as first language: 1.6%
- Other as first language: 0.8%

== Education ==
Sir Wilfrid Laurier School Board operates Anglophone public schools:

- Laurentian Regional High School in Lachute

== See also ==
- List of anglophone communities in Quebec
