= Quebec Route 323 =

Highway in Quebec, Canada

Route 323

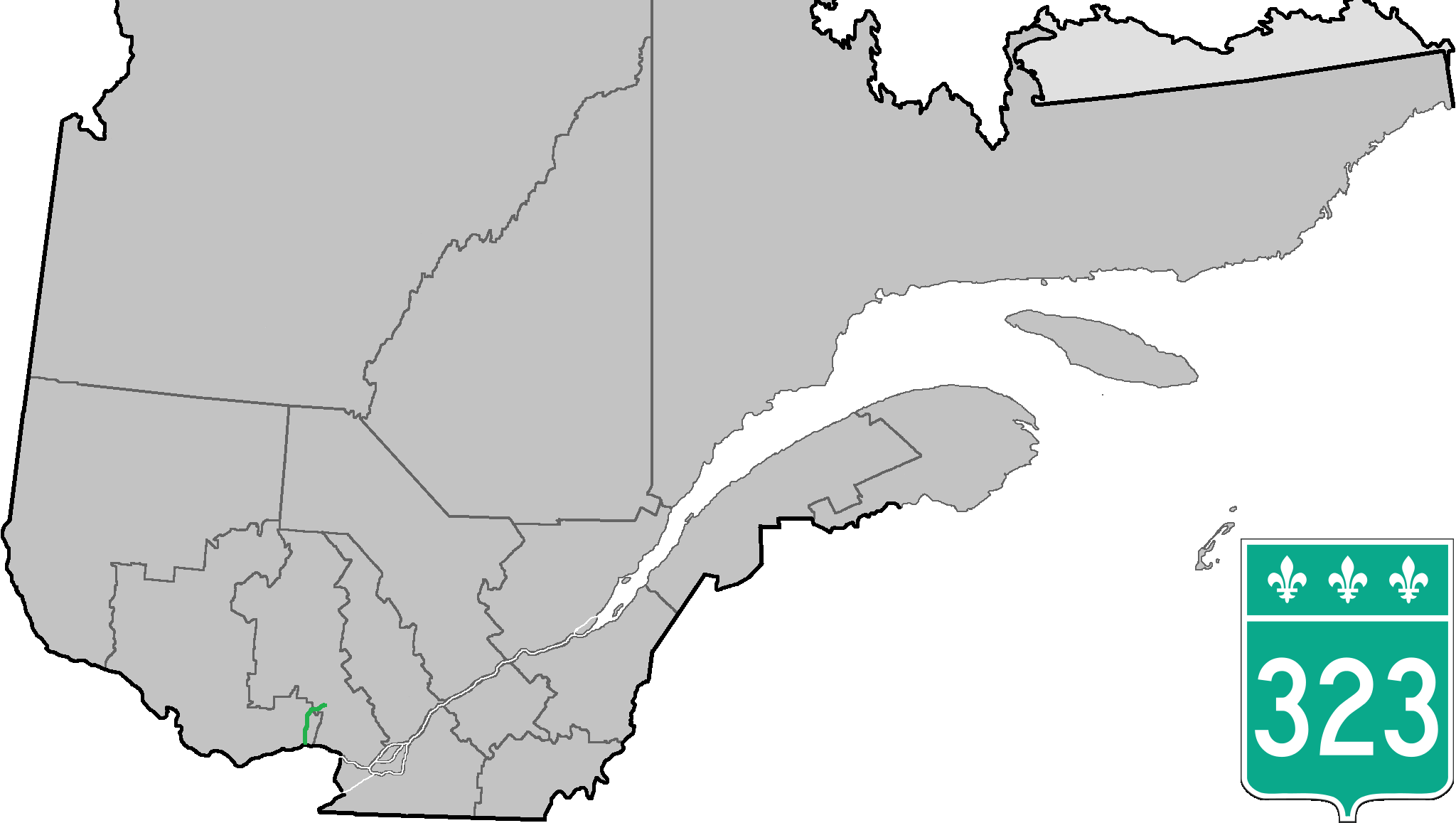

Route information
- Maintained by Transports Québec
- Length: 75.6 km (47.0 mi)

Major junctions
- South end: R-148 in Montebello
- A-50 in Montebello; R-315 in Namur; R-364 in Amherst
- North end: R-117 (TCH) in Mont-Tremblant

Location
- Country: Canada
- Province: Quebec
- Major cities: Mont-Tremblant, Saint-André-Avellin

Highway system
- Quebec provincial highways; Autoroutes; List; Former
← R-321	→ R-325

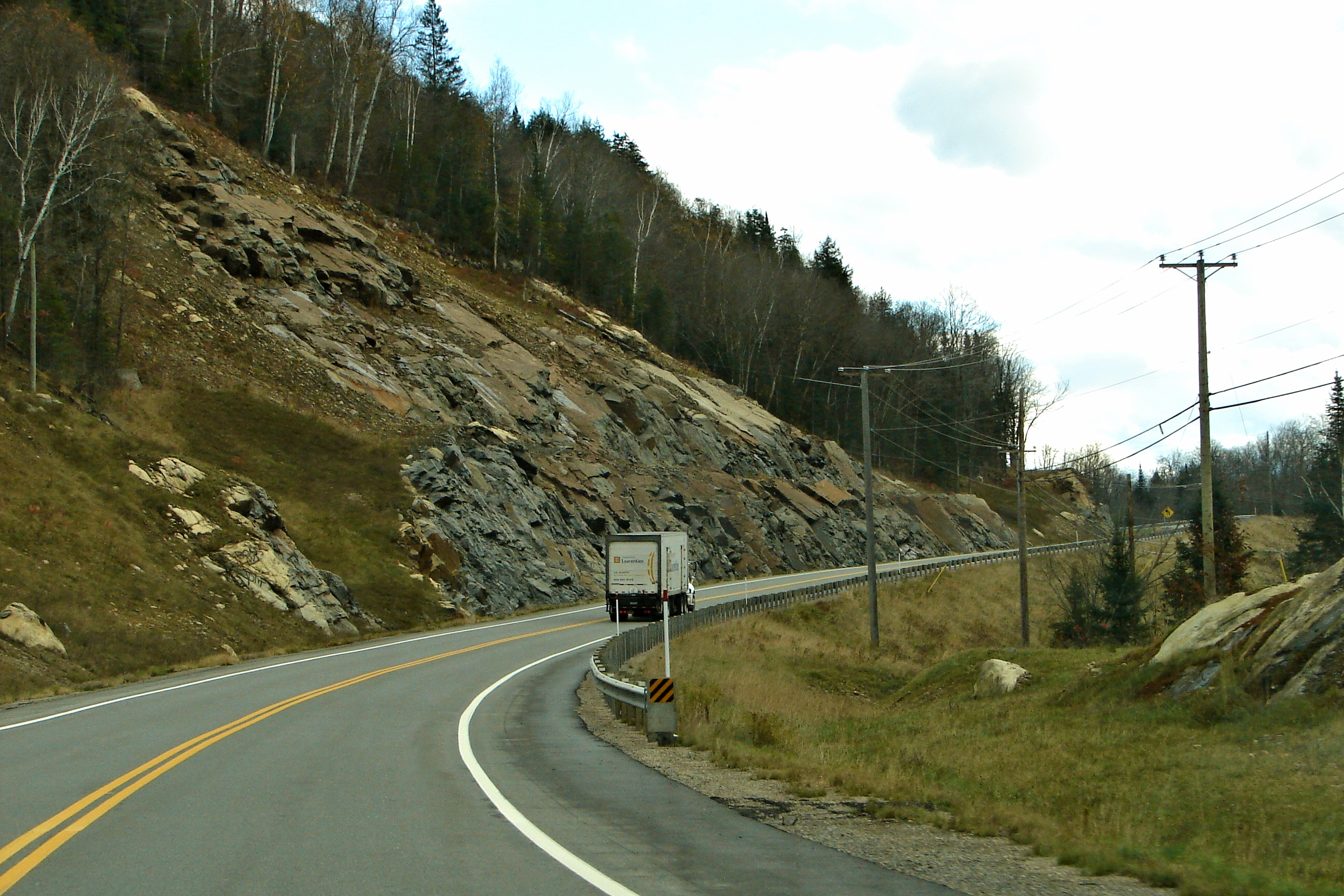
The upgraded Route 323 between Lac-des-Plages and Amherst

Highway 323 is a highway in Quebec that runs from the junction of Route 148 in Montebello to the junction of Route 117 in Mont-Tremblant. This highway is along the main route from Ottawa and Greater Toronto Area to Mont-Tremblant.

== History ==
Before the bypass was built in 2008, road conditions were often criticized. Several pot-holes and cracks in the asphalt made this narrow road a long trip for many drivers. This section, now bypassing Lac-des-Plages, was opened to traffic in the fall of 2008.

The narrow section that was northeast of Lac-des-Plages and closer to Amherst had many turns and was prone to flooding. This resulted in Highway 323 being closed on occasion, especially in springtime. It was straightened and realigned away from the river in March 2007. Work involved significant tree cutting and blasting. It was opened in the fall of 2009.

== Municipalities along Route 323 ==
- Montebello
- Notre-Dame-de-Bonsecours
- Papineauville
- Saint-André-Avellin
- Notre-Dame-de-la-Paix
- Namur
- Saint-Émile-de-Suffolk
- Lac-des-Plages
- Amherst
- Brébeuf
- Mont-Tremblant

== Major intersections ==
RCM or ET	Municipality	km	Junction	Notes
Southern terminus of Route 323
Papineau	Montebello	0.0	R-148	148 WEST: to Papineauville; 148 EAST: to Notre-Dame-de-Bonsecours
Papineau	Namur	32.0	R-315 (North end)	315 SOUTH: to Chénéville
Les Laurentides	Amherst	55.7	R-364 (West end)	364 EAST: to Huberdeau
Les Laurentides	Mont-Tremblant	75.6	R-117 (TCH)	117 SOUTH: to Saint-Faustin—Lac-Carré; 117 NORTH: to La Conception
Northern terminus of Route 323

== See also ==
- List of Quebec provincial highways
