= Lac-Simon =

Lac-Simon may refer to:

- Lac-Simon, Abitibi-Témiscamingue, Quebec, an Indian reserve
- Lac-Simon, Outaouais, Quebec, a municipality
