= Montpellier, Quebec =

Montpellier
- Municipality
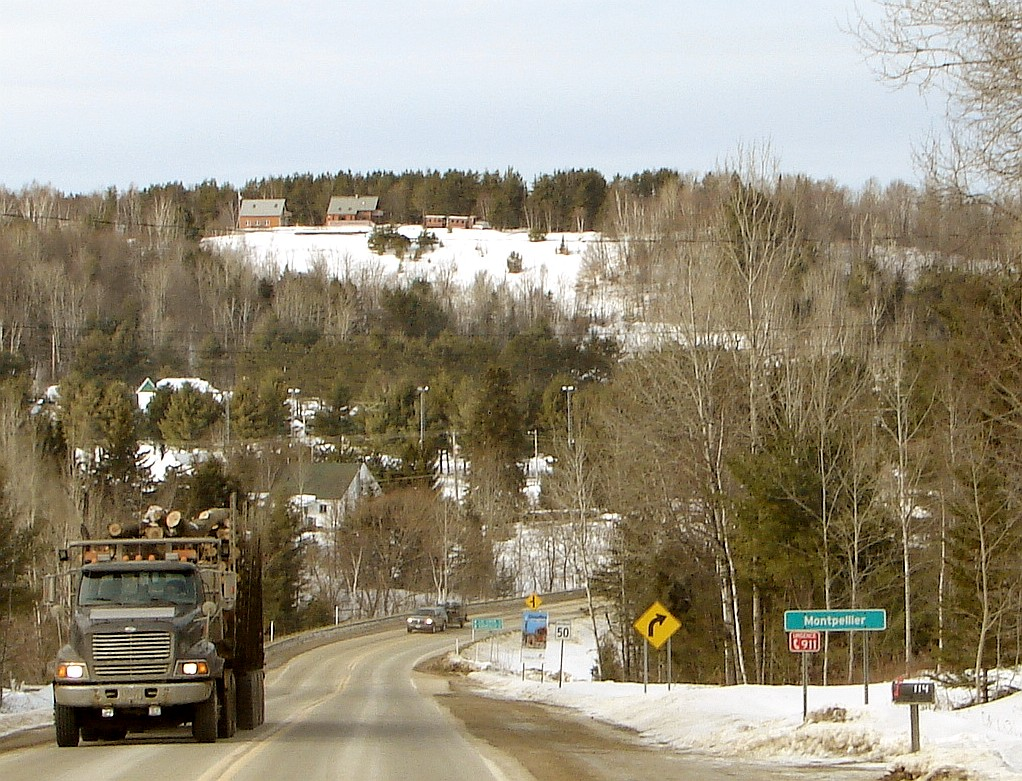
- Road 315 in Montpellier

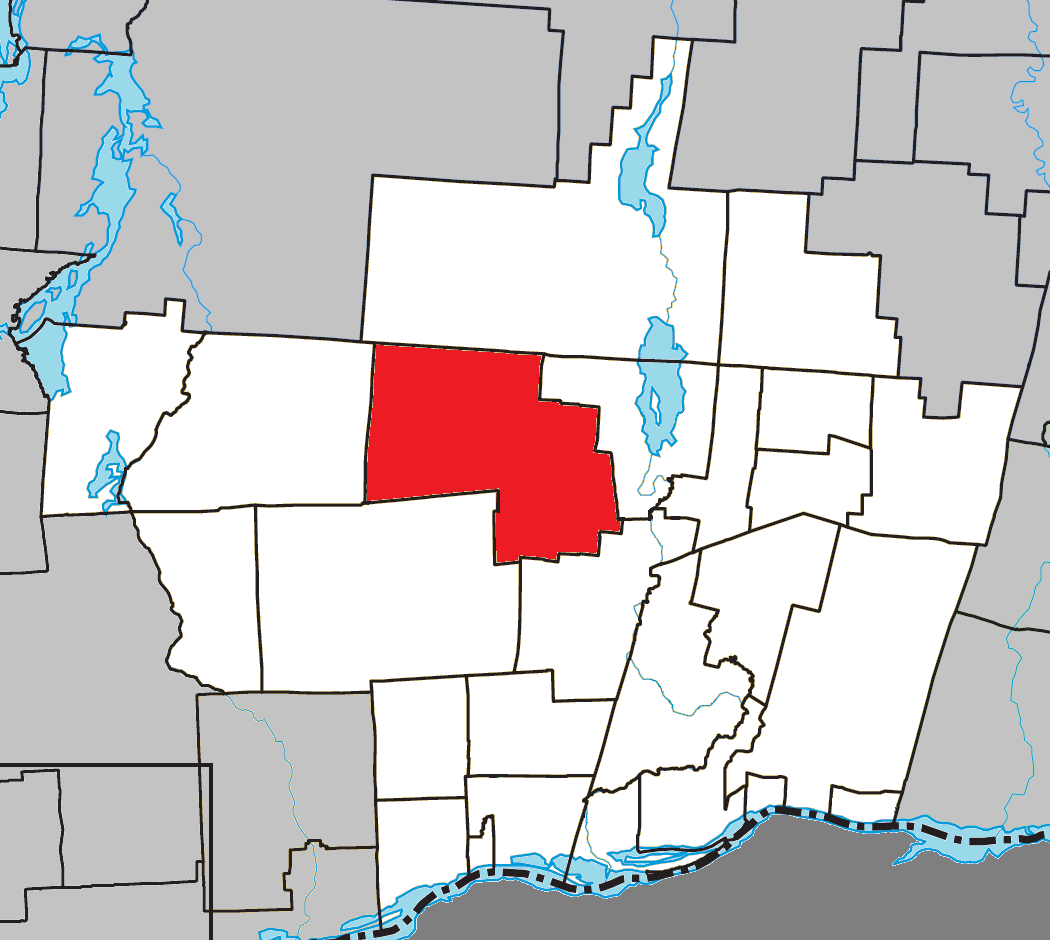
- Location within Papineau RCM

- Location in western Quebec
- Coordinates: 45°51′N 75°10′W
- Country: Canada
- Province: Quebec
- Region: Outaouais
- RCM: Papineau
- Settled: 1890s
- Constituted: October 11, 1920

Government
  - Mayor: Pierre Bernier
  - Federal riding: Argenteuil—La Petite-Nation
  - Prov. riding: Papineau

Area
  - Total: 266.00 km^{2} (102.70 sq mi)
  - Land: 246.12 km^{2} (95.03 sq mi)

Population (2021)
  - Total: 1,112
  - Density: 4.5/km^{2} (12/sq mi)
  - Pop 2016-2021: ▲12.9%
  - Dwellings: 954
- Time zone: UTC−5 (EST)
  - Summer (DST): UTC−4 (EDT)
- Postal code(s): J0V 1M0
- Area code: 819
- Highways: R-315
- Website: montpellier.ca

Montpellier (French pronunciation: [mɔ̃pəlje]) is a town and municipality in the Papineau Regional County Municipality in the Outaouais region of Quebec, Canada. The town is located 30 kilometres (19 mi) northwest of Papineauville.

The municipality includes the settlements of Montpellier and Lac-Schryer. Its western portion consists mostly of undeveloped Laurentian Hills, part of the Papineau-Labelle Wildlife Reserve.

== History ==
In the late 19th century, pioneers arrived in the area searching for work in logging and agriculture. In 1882, in the north-west of what would later become the village, the forestry company W.C. Edwards opened a project to exploit timber at Muskrat Lake. Under the supervision of foreman, a man named Schraire, the log drivers brought logs down the creek to Lake Schryer to reach the saw mill downstream of the lake.

Settlement occurred slowly along the shores of Lake Schryer. In 1892, Louis Beaulieu, called Montpellier, settled here on a farm and opened a post office and general store. After his marriage to Albina Bissonnette, they settled in the village known as Montpellier today. Shortly after, Moses Faubert left Mulgrave Township and settled here with his sixteen children. Several other families from neighboring townships came to reside in the village, contributing to the development of the small community.

In 1900, construction began on a chapel at the village center. On 25 September 1902, the mission of Notre-Dame-de-la-Consolation was founded, and on 21 October 1907, the Archbishop of Ottawa decreed the establishment of the parish. On 23 October 1920, the Municipality of Montpellier was formed, matching the boundaries of the parish.

In 1998, the southern portion of the Lac-des-Écorces Unorganized Territory was annexed by Montpellier, adding about 136 square kilometres (53 sq mi) and more than doubling its size.

== Demographics ==
Canada census – Montpellier community profile

| | 2021 | 2016 | 2011 |
| Population | 1,112 (+12.9% from 2016) | 985 (-0.1% from 2011) | 986 (2.1% from 2006) |
| Land area | 246.12 km^{2} (95.03 sq mi) | 249.14 km^{2} (96.19 sq mi) | 248.34 km^{2} (95.88 sq mi) |
| Population density | 4.5/km^{2} (12/sq mi) | 4.0/km^{2} (10/sq mi) | 4.0/km^{2} (10/sq mi) |
| Median age | 60.4 (M: 60.8, F: 60.0) | 58.1 (M: 58.8, F: 57.4) | 56.1 (M: 56.2, F: 55.8) |
| Private dwellings | 954 (total) 589 (occupied) | 896 (total) | 789 (total) |
| Median household income | $54,800 | $45,184 | $37,456 |

References: 2021 2016 2011

Historical census populations – Montpellier, Quebec
| Year | Pop. | ±% |
|---|---|---|
| 1986 | 647 | — |
| 1991 | 734 | +13.4% |
| 1996 | 835 | +13.8% |
| 2001 | 734 | −12.1% |
| 2006 | 966 | +31.6% |
| 2011 | 986 | +2.1% |
| 2016 | 985 | −0.1% |
| 2021 | 1,112 | +12.9% |
Source: Statistics Canada

Mother tongue:

- English as first language: 4%
- French as first language: 92.4%
- English and French as first language: 2.7%
- Other as first language: 0.4%

== Local government ==
Montpellier federal election results
| Year | Liberal | | Conservative | | Bloc Québécois | | New Democratic | | Green | |
|---|---|---|---|---|---|---|---|---|---|---|
| 2021 | 38% | 275 | 12% | 88 | 43% | 311 | 4% | 28 | 0% | 0 |
| 2019 | 30% | 214 | 14% | 97 | 46% | 327 | 4% | 28 | 5% | 35 |

Montpellier provincial election results
| Year | CAQ | | Liberal | | QC solidaire | | Parti Québécois | |
|---|---|---|---|---|---|---|---|---|
| 2018 | 47% | 292 | 18% | 110 | 14% | 86 | 15% | 95 |
| 2014 | 17% | 110 | 42% | 273 | 4% | 29 | 34% | 223 |

Montpellier forms part of the federal electoral district of Argenteuil—La Petite-Nation and has been represented by Stéphane Lauzon of the Liberal Party since 2015. Provincially, Montpellier is part of the Papineau electoral district and is represented by Mathieu Lacombe of the Coalition Avenir Québec since 2018.

List of former mayors:

- Rhéo Faubert (2001–2005)
- Stéphane Séguin (2005–2009)
- Pierre Bernier (2009-2013)
- Stéphane Séguin (2013–present)
