= Papineau Regional County Municipality =

Papineau
- Regional county municipality
- Coordinates: 45°53′N 75°03′W
- Country: Canada
- Province: Quebec
- Region: Outaouais
- Effective: January 1, 1983
- County seat: Papineauville

Government
  - Type: Prefecture
  - Prefect: Paul-André David

Area
  - Total: 3,205.90 km^{2} (1,237.80 sq mi)
  - Land: 3,016.78 km^{2} (1,164.79 sq mi)

Population (2021)
  - Total: 25,149
  - Density: 8.3/km^{2} (21/sq mi)
  - Change 2016-2021: ▲6.5%
  - Dwellings: 16,537
- Time zone: UTC−5 (EST)
  - Summer (DST): UTC−4 (EDT)
- Area code: 819
- Website: www.mrcpapineau.com

Papineau (French pronunciation: [papino]) is a regional county municipality in the Outaouais region of Quebec, Canada. The seat is Papineauville.

== Subdivisions ==
There are 25 subdivisions within the RCM:

| Name | Type | Population (2016) | Area (km^{2}) | Density (inhab./km^{2}) |
|---|---|---|---|---|
| Boileau | Municipality | 335 | 136.33 | 2.5 |
| Bowman | Municipality | 658 | 129.30 | 5.1 |
| Chénéville | Municipality | 764 | 66.76 | 11.4 |
| Duhamel | Municipality | 430 | 434.57 | 1.0 |
| Fassett | Municipality | 431 | 12.49 | 34.5 |
| Lac-des-Plages | Municipality | 431 | 152.94 | 2.8 |
| Lac-Simon | Municipality | 944 | 97.48 | 9.7 |
| Lochaber | Township | 415 | 60.70 | 6.8 |
| Lochaber-Partie-Ouest | Township | 856 | 57.45 | 14.9 |
| Mayo | Municipality | 601 | 73.25 | 8.2 |
| Montebello | Municipality | 983 | 8.62 | 114.0 |
| Montpellier | Municipality | 985 | 249.14 | 4.0 |
| Mulgrave-et-Derry | Municipality | 369 | 293.75 | 1.3 |
| Namur | Municipality | 572 | 56.76 | 10.1 |
| Notre-Dame-de-Bonsecours | Municipality | 301 | 264.97 | 1.1 |
| Notre-Dame-de-la-Paix | Municipality | 648 | 106.62 | 6.1 |
| Notre-Dame-de-la-Salette | Municipality | 727 | 117.10 | 6.3 |
| Papineauville | Municipality | 2,101 | 61.33 | 34.3 |
| Plaisance | Municipality | 1,088 | 36.15 | 30.1 |
| Ripon | Municipality | 1,542 | 131.47 | 11.7 |
| Saint-André-Avellin | Municipality | 3,749 | 137.99 | 27.2 |
| Saint-Émile-de-Suffolk | Municipality | 477 | 56.68 | 8.4 |
| Saint-Sixte | Municipality | 469 | 85.33 | 5.5 |
| Thurso | City | 2,818 | 6.28 | 449.0 |
| Val-des-Bois | Municipality | 865 | 225.42 | 3.8 |
| Total | | 22,832 | 2,941.79 | 7.8 |

== Demographics ==
In the 2021 Census of Population conducted by Statistics Canada, the RCM of Papineau had a population of 24,308 living in 11,504 of its 16,059 total private dwellings, a change of 6.5% from its 2016 population of 22,832. With a land area of 2,903.45 km^{2} (1,121.03 sq mi), it had a population density of 8.4/km^{2} (21.7/sq mi) in 2021.

In 2021, the median age was 54.0, as opposed to 41.6 for all of Canada. French was the mother tongue of 91.2% of residents in 2021. The next most common mother tongues are English at 5.5% total, followed by Spanish and German at 0.2% each and by Portuguese at 0.1%. 1.9% reported both English and French as their first language. Additionally there were 0.1% who reported both French and a non-official language as their mother tongue and another 0.1% who reported both French, English and a non-official language as their mother tongue.

As of 2021, Indigenous peoples comprised 4.4% of the population, and visible minorities contributed 1.1%. The largest visible minority groups in the RCM of Papineau are Black (0.4%), Chinese (0.1%), and Arab (0.1%).

In 2021, 65.2% of the population identified as Catholic, while 26.1% said they had no religious affiliation. Baptists were the largest religious minority, making up 0.6% of the population. Buddhists were the largest non-Christian religious minority, making up just over 0.1% of the population.

Canada census – Papineau community profile

| | 2021 | 2016 | 2011 |
| Population | 24,308 (+6.5% from 2016) | 22,832 (1.3% from 2011) | 22,541 (3.1% from 2006) |
| Land area | 2,903.45 km^{2} (1,121.03 sq mi) | 2,941.79 km^{2} (1,135.83 sq mi) | 2,941.82 km^{2} (1,135.84 sq mi) |
| Population density | 8.4/km^{2} (22/sq mi) | 7.8/km^{2} (20/sq mi) | 7.7/km^{2} (20/sq mi) |
| Median age | 54 (M: 54.4, F: 53.6) | 52.1 (M: 52.2, F: 52.0) | 49.9 (M: 49.8, F: 50.1) |
| Private dwellings | 11,505 (total) | 15,893 (total) | 14,569 (total) |
| Median household income | | $51,196 | $44,308 |

References: 2021 2016 2011

Historical census populations
| Year | Pop. | ±% |
|---|---|---|
| 1986 | 18,790 | — |
| 1991 | 19,526 | +3.9% |
| 1996 | 20,308 | +4.0% |
| 2001 | 20,367 | +0.3% |
| 2006 | 21,863 | +7.3% |
| 2011 | 22,541 | +3.1% |
| 2016 | 22,832 | +1.3% |

Mother tongue from Canada 2016 Census

| Language | Population | Pct (%) |
|---|---|---|
| French only | 21,015 | 92.6% |
| English only | 1,150 | 5.1% |
| Both English and French | 250 | 1.1% |
| Other languages | 270 | 1.19% |

== Transportation ==
=== Access Routes ===
Highways and numbered routes that run through the municipality, including external routes that start or finish at the county border:

- Autoroutes
  - A-50
- Principal Highways
  - R-148
- Secondary Highways
  - R-307
  - R-309
  - R-315
  - R-317
  - R-321
  - R-323
- External Routes
  - None

== See also ==
- List of regional county municipalities and equivalent territories in Quebec
