= Lac-des-Plages =

- Municipality
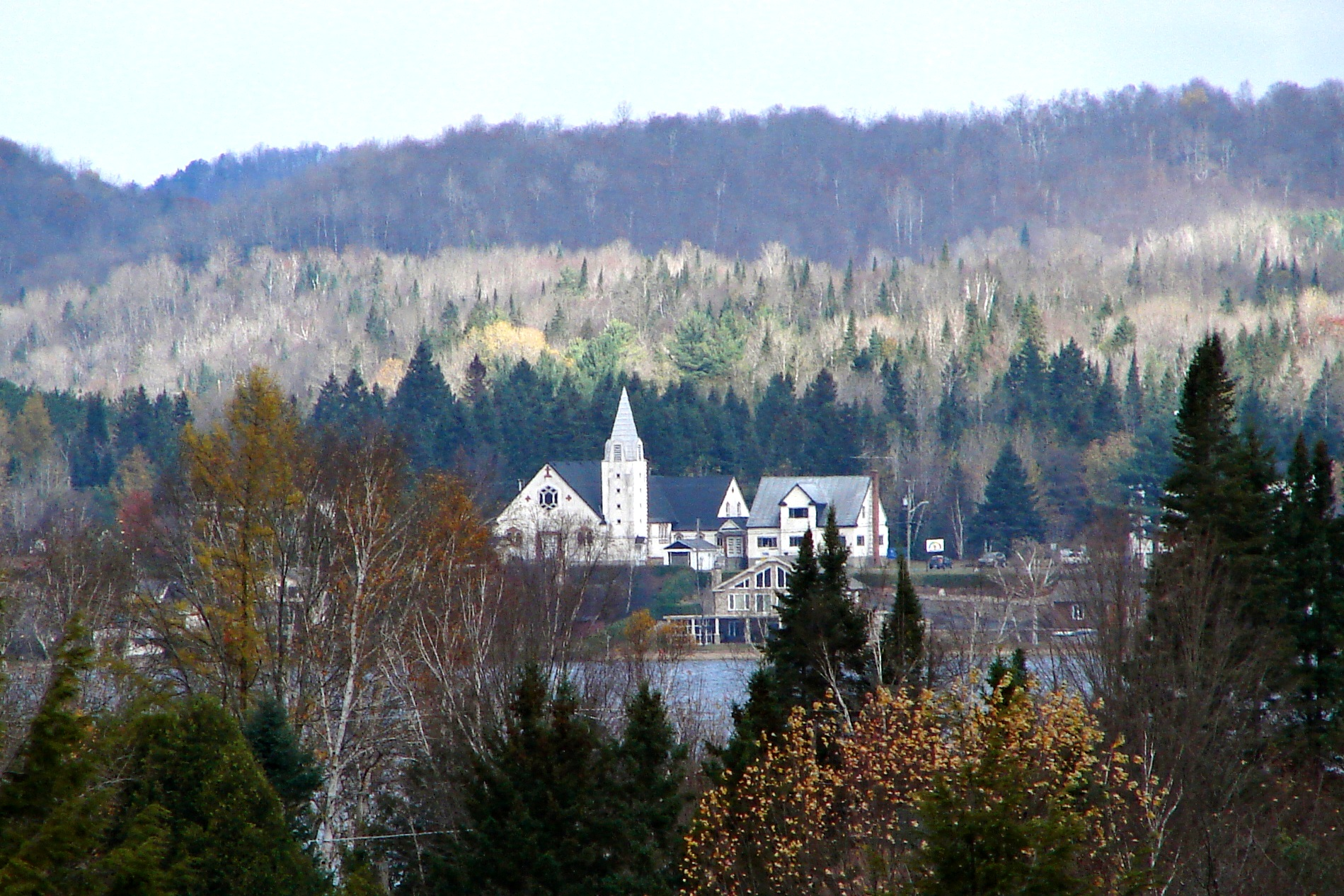
- Church of Lac-des-Plages

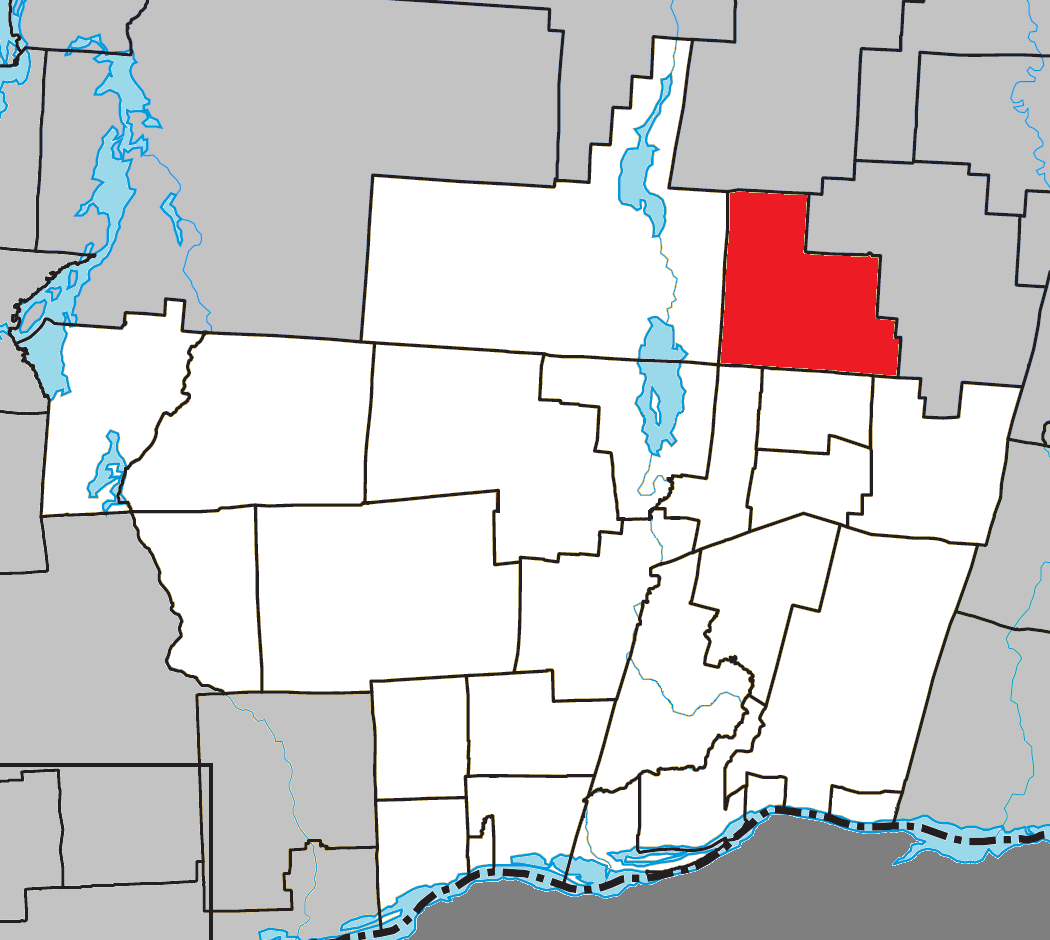
- Location within Papineau RCM

- Location in western Quebec
- Coordinates: 46°00′N 74°54′W
- Country: Canada
- Province: Quebec
- Region: Outaouais
- RCM: Papineau
- Constituted: January 1, 1950

Government
  - Mayor: Josée Simon
  - Federal riding: Argenteuil—La Petite-Nation
  - Prov. riding: Papineau

Area
  - Total: 168.20 km^{2} (64.94 sq mi)
  - Land: 150.95 km^{2} (58.28 sq mi)

Population (2021)
  - Total: 548
  - Density: 3.6/km^{2} (9.3/sq mi)
  - Pop 2016-2021: ▲27.1%
  - Dwellings: 696
- Time zone: UTC−5 (EST)
  - Summer (DST): UTC−4 (EDT)
- Postal code(s): J0T 1K0
- Area code: 819
- Highways: R-323
- Website: www.lacdesplages.com

Lac-des-Plages (French pronunciation: [lak de plaʒ]) is a town and municipality in the Outaouais region of Quebec, Canada, part of the Papineau Regional County Municipality. It is named after Lac des Plages (French for "Lake of Beaches") which attracts many vacationers with the beauty of its beaches.

== History ==
The community and post office have been identified under several other names, following the name changes of the adjacent lake. It was first known as Lac Rond (Round Lake), Lac Desormeaux (in honour of pioneer Norbert Desormeaux who arrived in the territory in 1890), as well as Lac des Sables (Sand Lake).

In 1950, the Municipality of Lac-des-Plages was formed when its territory detached from the United Township Municipality of Suffolk-et-Addington.

== Demographics ==
Canada census – Lac-des-Plages community profile

	2021	2016	2011
Population	548 (+27.1% from 2016)	431 (-17.4% from 2011)	522 (29.5% from 2006)
Land area	150.95 km^{2} (58.28 sq mi)	152.94 km^{2} (59.05 sq mi)	152.96 km^{2} (59.06 sq mi)
Population density	3.6/km^{2} (9.3/sq mi)	2.8/km^{2} (7.3/sq mi)	3.4/km^{2} (8.8/sq mi)
Median age	60.8 (M: 60.8, F: 60.4)	58.4 (M: 58.4, F: 58.5)	54.5 (M: 54.1, F: 55.0)
Private dwellings	696 (total) 317 (occupied)	704 (total)	673 (total)
Median household income	$52,800	$47,829

References: 2021 2016 2011

Historical census populations – Lac-des-Plages, Quebec
Year	Pop.	±%
1986	355	—
1991	374	+5.4%
1996	380	+1.6%
2001	362	−4.7%
2006	403	+11.3%
2011	522	+29.5%
2016	431	−17.4%
2021	548	+27.1%
Source: Statistics Canada

Mother tongue:

- English as first language: 3.6%
- French as first language: 90.9%
- English and French as first language: 3.6%
- Other as first language: 1.8%

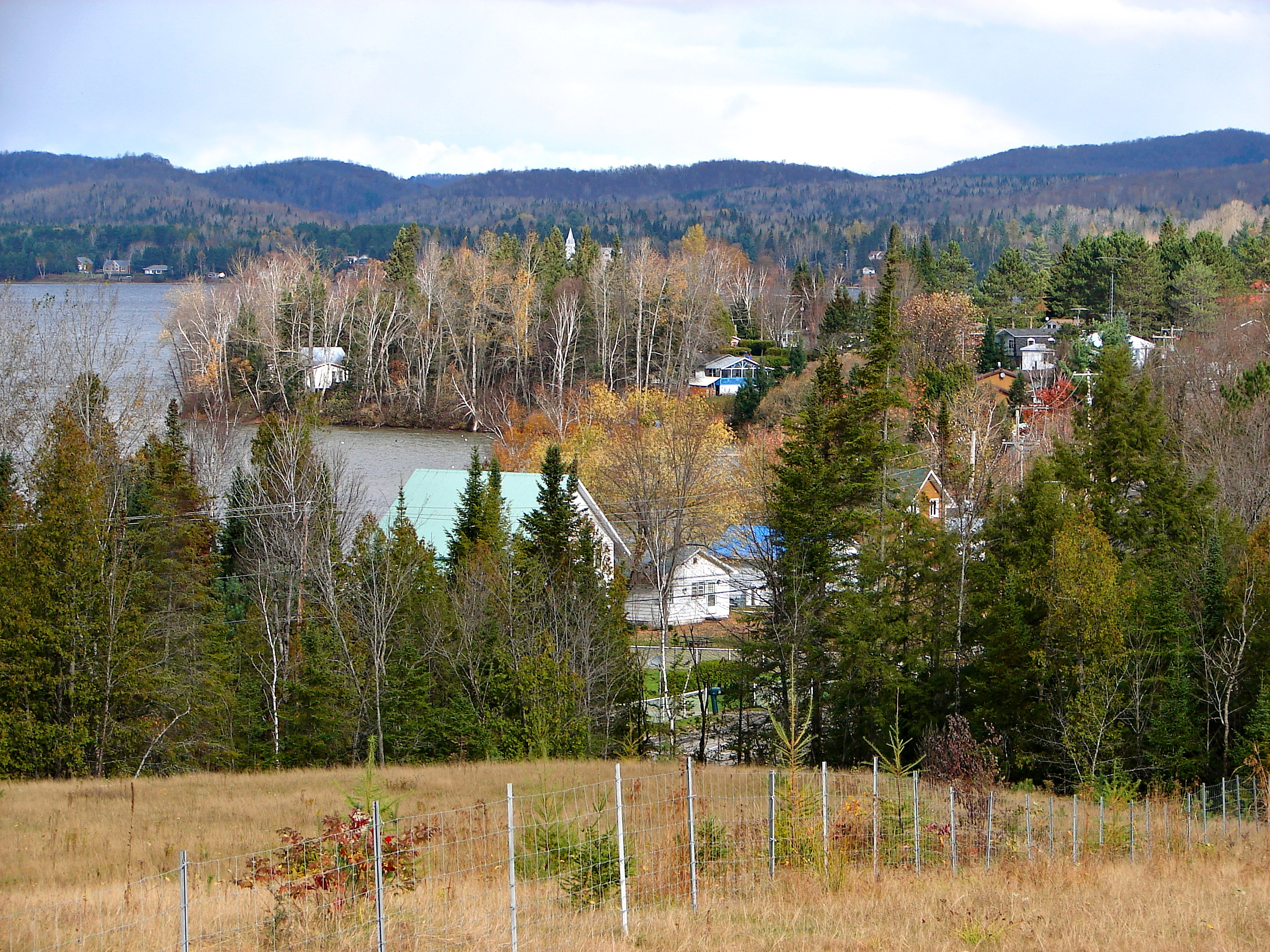
Lac-des-Plages
