= Lochaber-Partie-Ouest =

- Township municipality
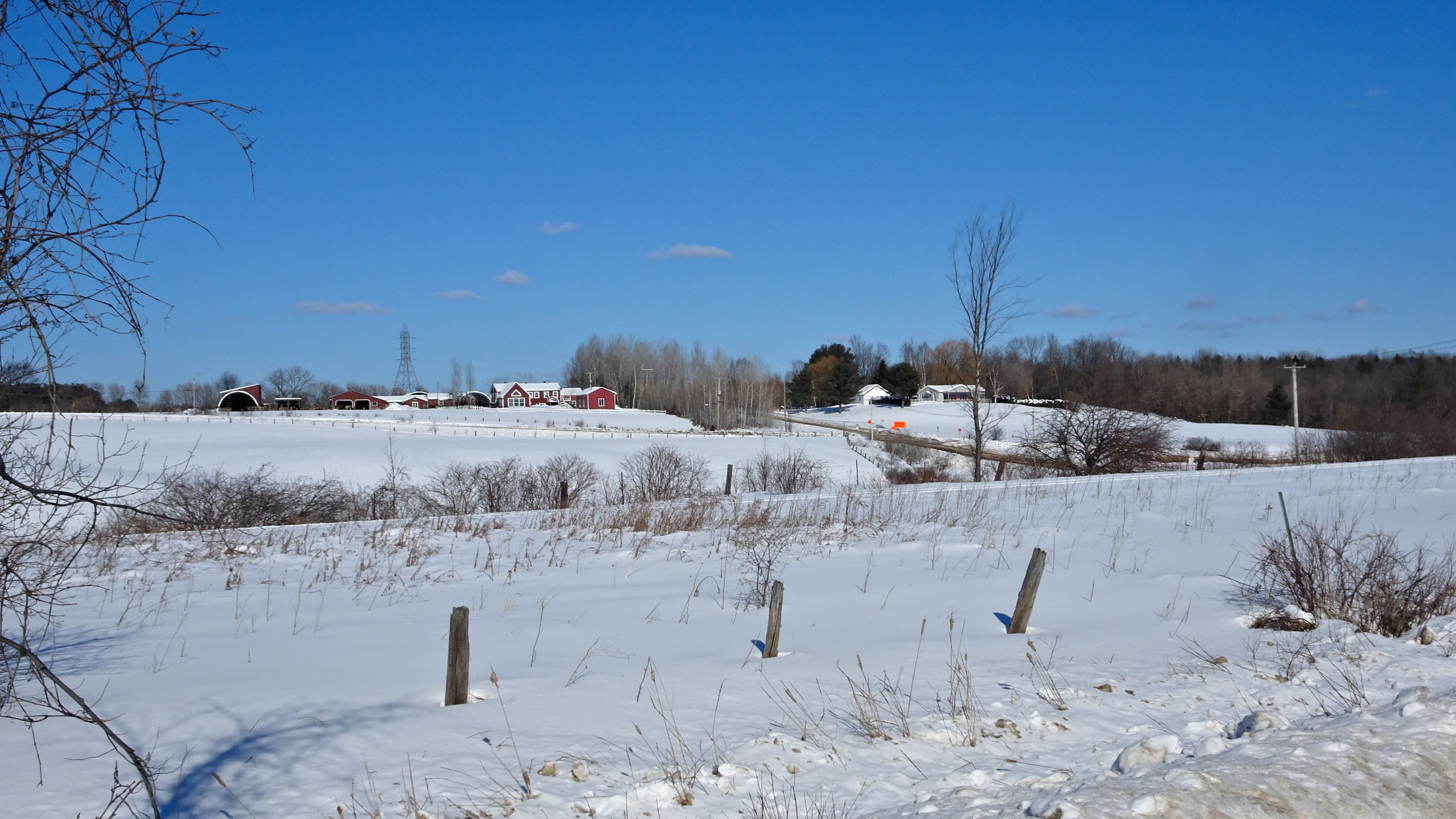
- Rural area of Lochaber-Partie-Ouest

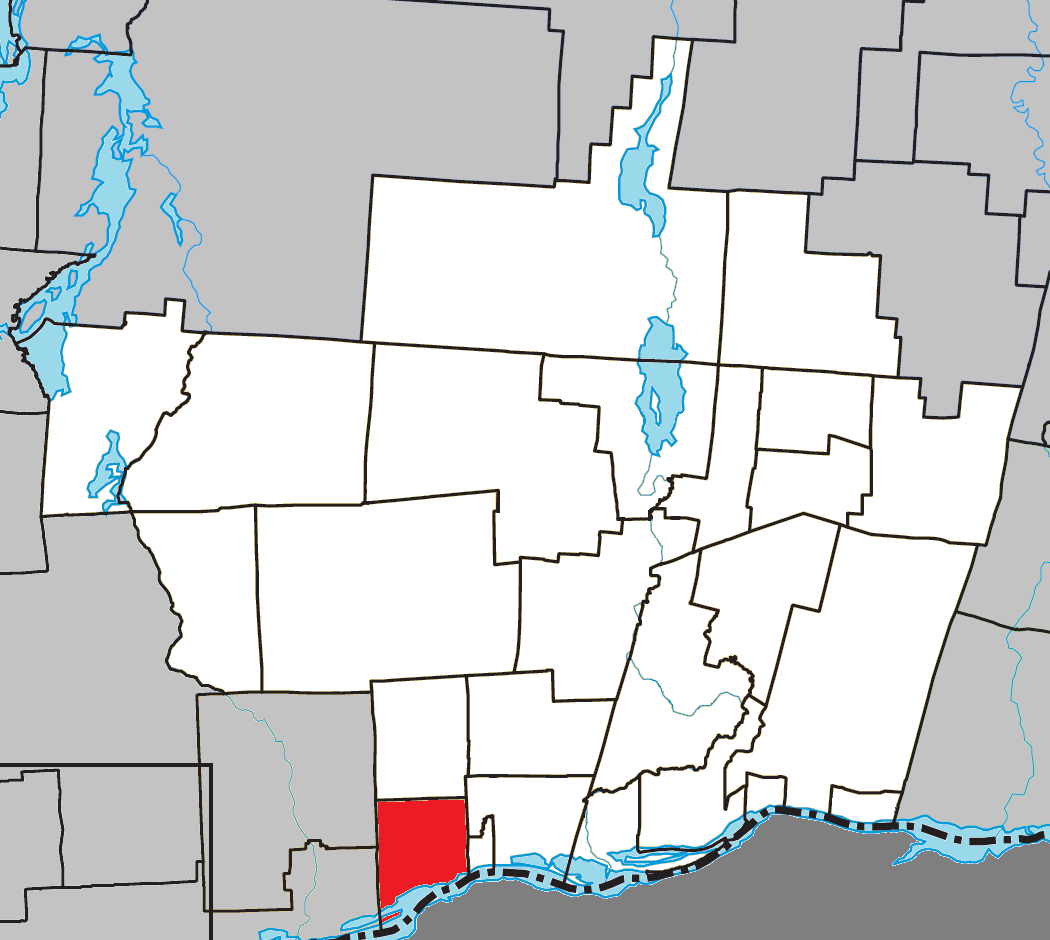
- Location within Papineau RCM

- Location in western Quebec
- Coordinates: 45°37′N 75°18′W
- Country: Canada
- Province: Quebec
- Region: Outaouais
- RCM: Papineau
- Constituted: April 20, 1891

Government
  - Mayor: Pierre Renaud
  - Federal riding: Argenteuil—Papineau—Mirabel
  - Prov. riding: Papineau

Area
  - Total: 66.00 km^{2} (25.48 sq mi)
  - Land: 57.39 km^{2} (22.16 sq mi)

Population (2021)
  - Total: 926
  - Density: 16.1/km^{2} (42/sq mi)
  - Pop 2016-2021: ▲8.2%
  - Dwellings: 358
- Time zone: UTC−5 (EST)
  - Summer (DST): UTC−4 (EDT)
- Postal code(s): J0X 3B0
- Area code: 819
- Highways A-50: R-148
- Website: www.lochaber-ouest.ca

Lochaber-Partie-Ouest is a township municipality in the Canadian province of Quebec, located within the Papineau Regional County Municipality. The township had a population of 926 in the 2021 Canadian Census.

The township is predominantly agricultural which is the main economic activity.

== History ==
In 1807, a group of about 400 Scottish Highlanders settled in the area, the same year the geographic township of Lochaber Gore was created. They came from the Highlands, near Lochaber and other parts of northern Scotland. Settlement was difficult, because income from agriculture was lower than the costs of importing manufactured products from Montreal.

With the arrival of the logging industry, the settlers were able to practice agriculture during the summer, while working in the lumberjack camps during the winter, or to work in the various sawmills that developed along the Blanche River near Thurso. The logging industry also attracted many more settlers, including French Canadians, and settlement was well underway at the turn of the 19th to 20th century. The population became predominantly Francophone at the start of the 20th century.

In 1891, the township municipality of Lochaber-Partie-Ouest was created when it was split off from Lochaber Township.

== Demographics ==
Historical census populations – Lochaber-Partie-Ouest
Year	Pop.	±%
1986	504	—
1991	470	−6.7%
1996	477	+1.5%
2001	460	−3.6%
2006	514	+11.7%
2011	646	+25.7%
2016	856	+32.5%
2021	926	+8.2%
Source: Statistics Canada

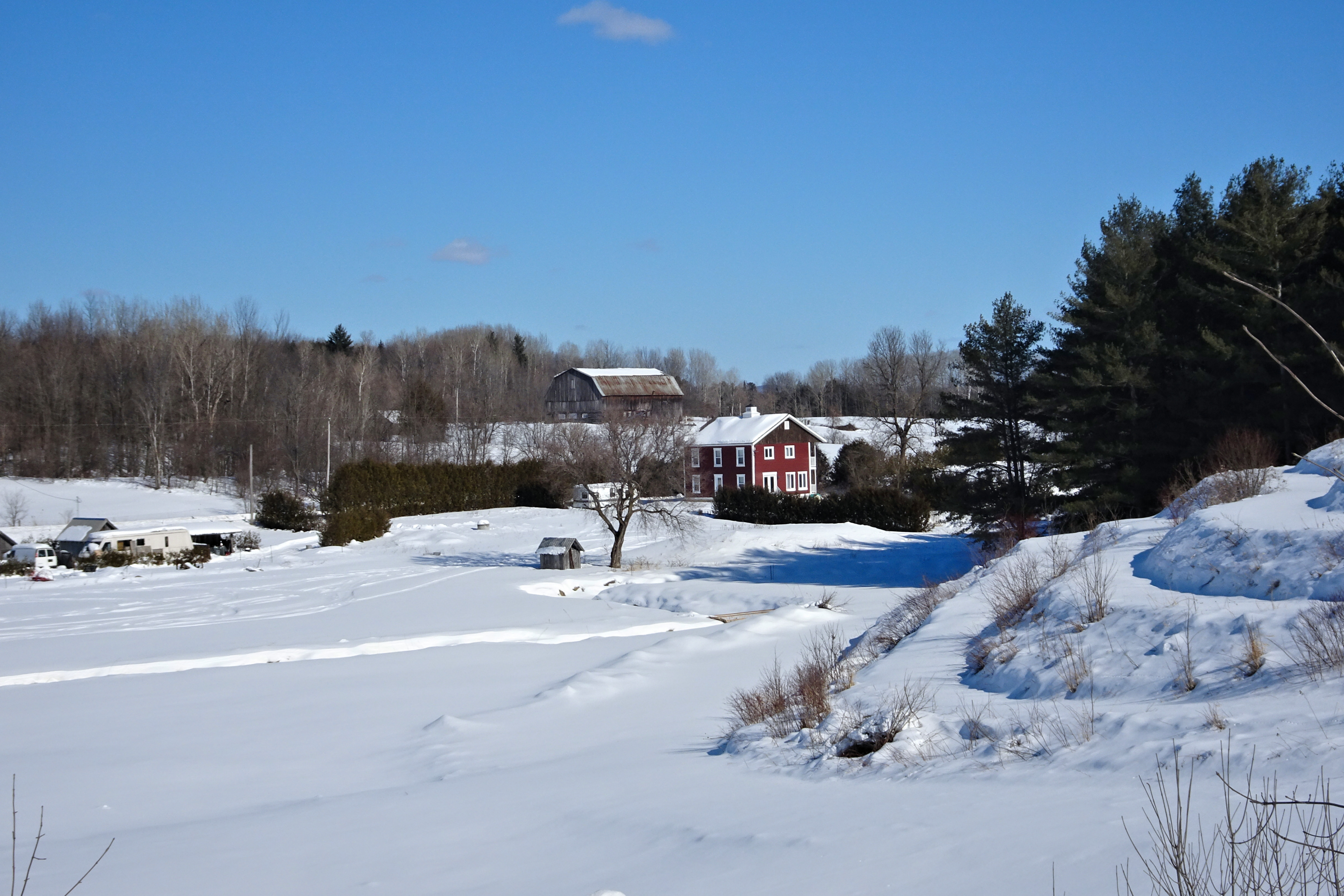
Lochaber-Partie-Ouest

In the 2021 Census of Population conducted by Statistics Canada, Lochaber-Partie-Ouest had a population of 926 living in 336 of its 358 total private dwellings, a change of 8.2% from its 2016 population of 856. With a land area of 57.39 km^{2} (22.16 sq mi), it had a population density of 16.1/km^{2} (41.8/sq mi) in 2021.

Canada census – Lochaber-Partie-Ouest community profile

	2021	2016	2011
Population	926 (+8.2% from 2016)	856 (32.5% from 2011)	646 (25.7% from 2006)
Land area	57.39 km^{2} (22.16 sq mi)	57.45 km^{2} (22.18 sq mi)	57.41 km^{2} (22.17 sq mi)
Population density	16.1/km^{2} (42/sq mi)	14.9/km^{2} (39/sq mi)	11.3/km^{2} (29/sq mi)
Median age	42.0 (M: 42.0, F: 43.2)	41.6 (M: 42.0, F: 40.8)	40.0 (M: 40.9, F: 39.1)
Private dwellings	358 (total) 336 (occupied)	339 (total)	248 (total)
Median household income	$102,000	$81,067	$54,239

References: 2021 2016 2011

Mother tongue:

- English as first language: 8.1%
- French as first language: 90.1%
- English and French as first language: 1.2%
- Other as first language: 1.2%

== Local government ==
List of former mayors:

- Michel Labrecque (2001–2009)
- Jean-Pierre Girard (2013–2017)
- Pierre Renaud (2017–present)
