= Chénéville =

- Municipality
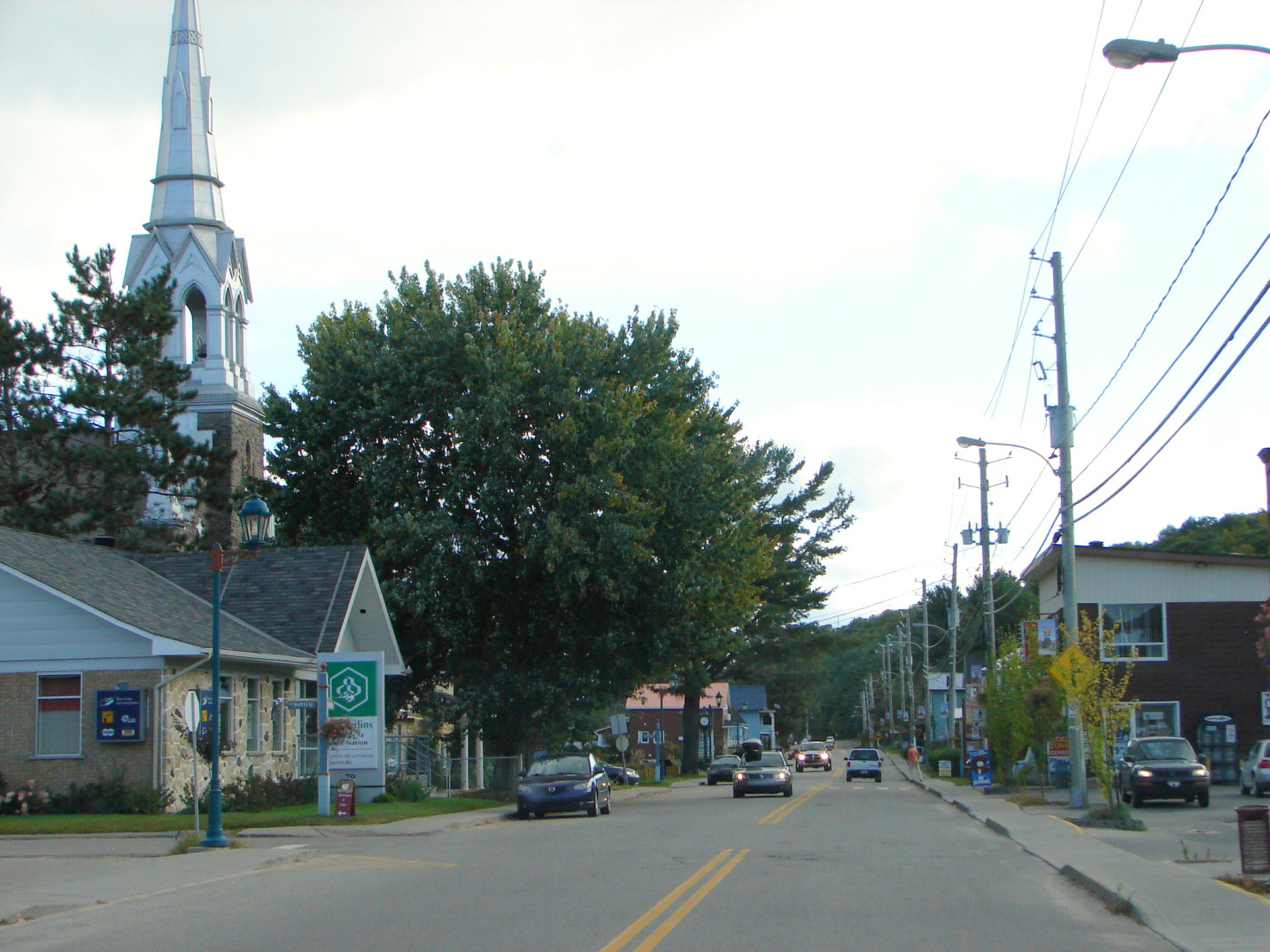

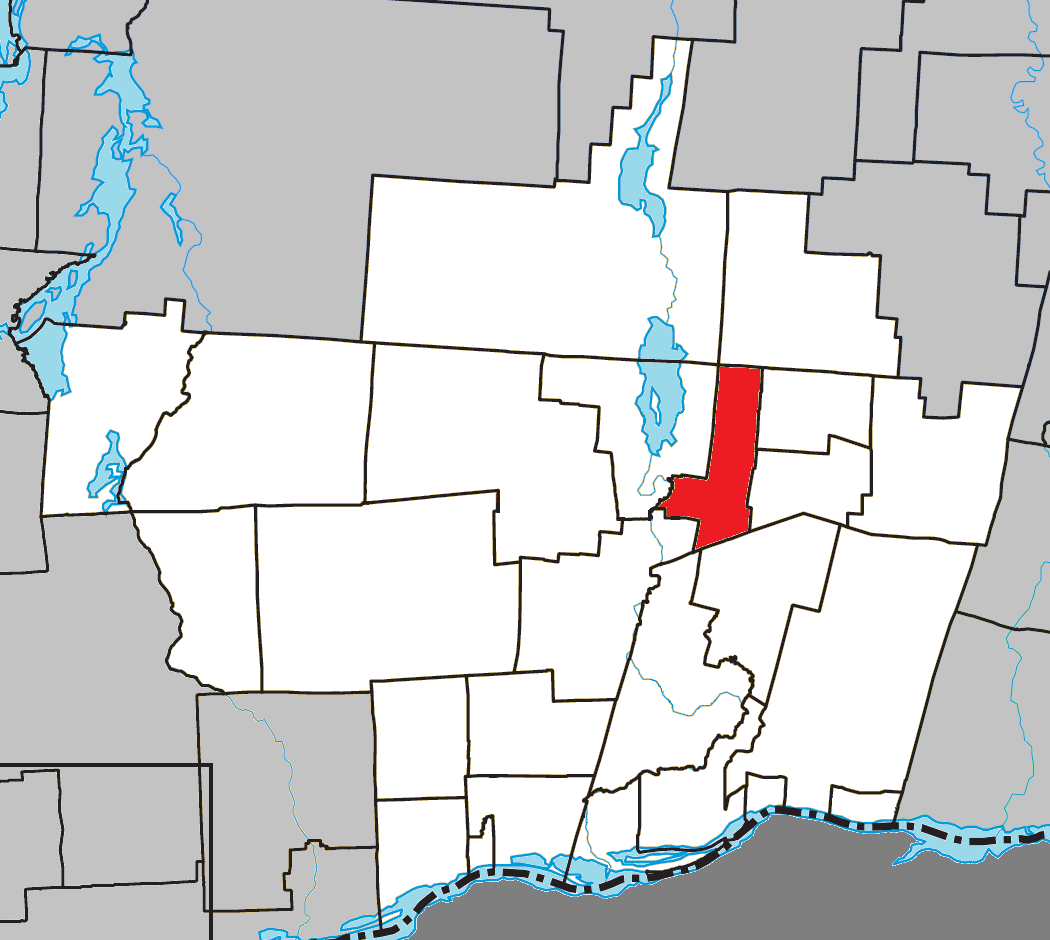
- Location within Papineau RCM

- Location in western Quebec
- Coordinates: 45°53′N 75°03′W
- Country: Canada
- Province: Quebec
- Region: Outaouais
- RCM: Papineau
- Settled: 1850s
- Constituted: August 21, 1996

Government
  - Mayor: Maxime Proulx-Cadieux
  - Federal riding: Argenteuil—La Petite-Nation
  - Prov. riding: Papineau

Area
  - Total: 66.80 km^{2} (25.79 sq mi)
  - Land: 65.83 km^{2} (25.42 sq mi)

Population (2021)
  - Total: 848
  - Density: 12.9/km^{2} (33/sq mi)
  - Pop 2016-2021: ▲11%
  - Dwellings: 500
- Time zone: UTC−5 (EST)
  - Summer (DST): UTC−4 (EDT)
- Postal code(s): J0V 1E0
- Area code: 819
- Highways: R-315; R-321
- Website: www.ville-cheneville.com

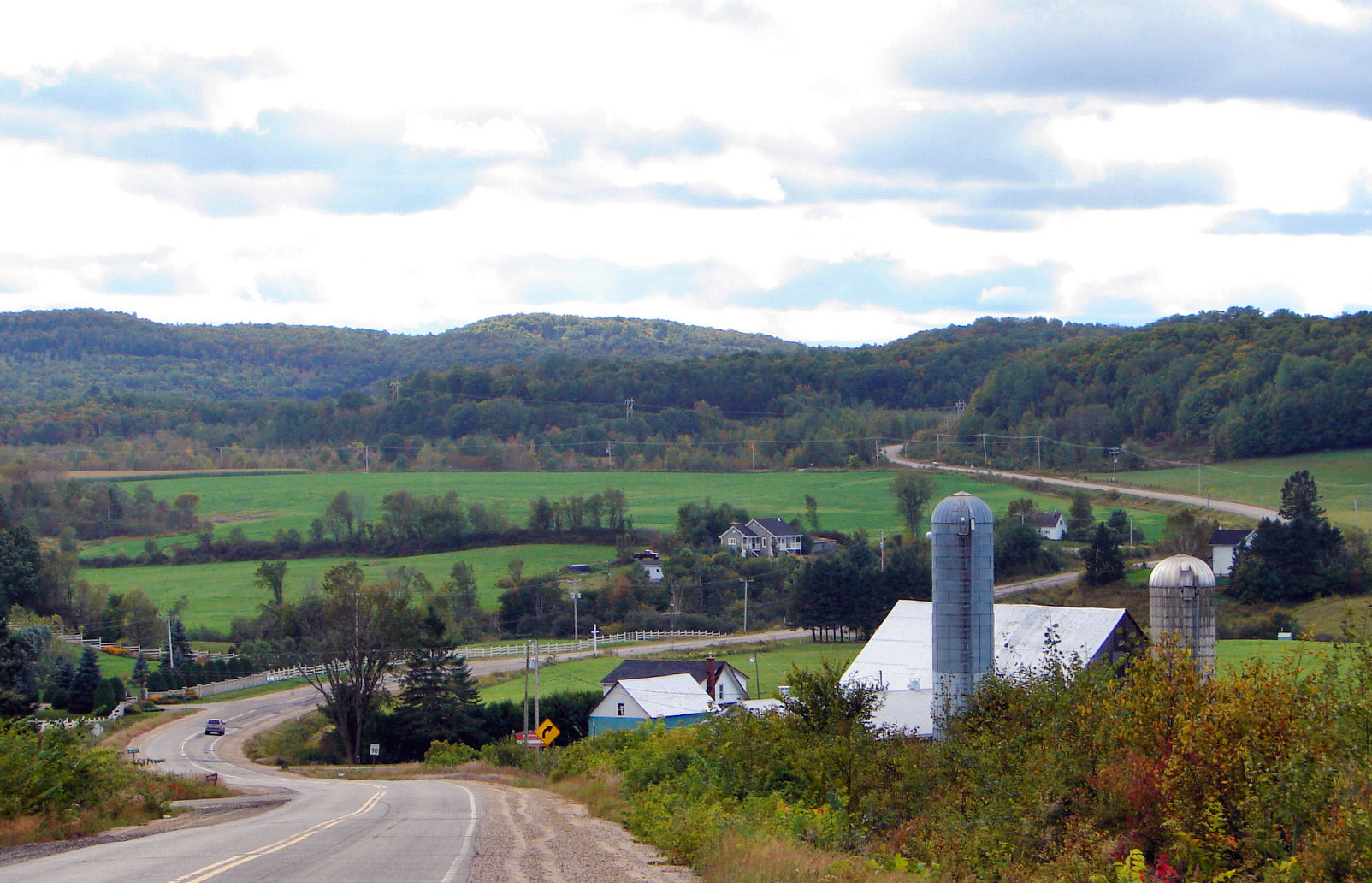
Route 315 through Chénéville

Chénéville (French pronunciation: [ʃenevil]) is a town and municipality in the Outaouais region of Quebec, Canada, part of the Papineau Regional County Municipality.

== History ==
First settled in the middle of the 19th century, its first post office opened in 1864 under the name Sévigné, perhaps in honour of the Marquise de Sévigné (1626-1696). From 1876 to 1884, the post office was known as Hartwell, and from 1884 on, it became Chénéville. It could be that it was renamed in memory of a nephew of Hercule Chéné who was born around 1864. (Pierre Hercule Chéné (1834-1904) was mayor of Ripon-et-Hartwell, Hartwell-et-Suffolk, Hartwell, and Hartwell-et-Preston, and counsellor of Chénéville.)

In 1903, the village separated from the United Township Municipality of Hartwell-et-Preston to form the Village Municipality of Chénéville, following a request from 55 citizens submitted to the Lieutenant Governor. Hygin Locas was its first mayor. At that time, the village consisted of 26 homes and 6 streets.

The Vinoy Post Office opened in 1871, most likely named in honour of the French General Joseph Vinoy (1800-1880). In 1920, the western portion of Suffolk Township separated and formed the Township Municipality of Suffolk-West, but was renamed Vinoy three years later. On August 21, 1996, the Vinoy merged to Chénéville and they formed the new Municipality of Chénéville.

== Demographics ==
Canada census – Chénéville community profile

	2021	2016	2011
Population	848 (+11.0% from 2016)	764 (-3.5% from 2011)	792 (1.0% from 2006)
Land area	65.83 km^{2} (25.42 sq mi)	66.76 km^{2} (25.78 sq mi)	65.15 km^{2} (25.15 sq mi)
Population density	12.9/km^{2} (33/sq mi)	11.4/km^{2} (30/sq mi)	12.2/km^{2} (32/sq mi)
Median age	55.2 (M: 56.0, F: 55.2)	53.5 (M: 52.2, F: 55.5)	51.3 (M: 50.9, F: 51.5)
Private dwellings	500 (total) 412 (occupied)	502 (total)	463 (total)
Median household income	$52,800	$39,040	$41,793

References: 2021 2016 2011

Historical census populations – Chénéville, Quebec
Year	Pop.	±%
1986	737	—
1991	760	+3.1%
1996	755	−0.7%
2001	738	−2.3%
2006	784	+6.2%
2011	792	+1.0%
2016	764	−3.5%
2021	848	+11.0%
Population amounts prior to 1998 are total of Chénéville VL and Vinoy SD. Source: Statistics Canada

- Population total in 1996:
  - Chénéville (village): 646
  - Vinoy (municipality): 109
- Population in 1991:
  - Chénéville (village): 635
  - Vinoy (municipality): 125

Mother tongue:

- English as first language: 3.6%
- French as first language: 92.9%
- English and French as first language: 3.0%
- Other as first language: 0.6%

== Education ==
A portion of the village lies in the Sir Wilfrid Laurier School Board, which operates Anglophone public schools:

- Laurentian Regional High School in Lachute

== Notable people ==
- Marquise Lepage (born 1959), producer, screenwriter, and film and television director
