= Notre-Dame-de-la-Paix, Quebec =

Notre-Dame-de-la-Paix
- Municipality
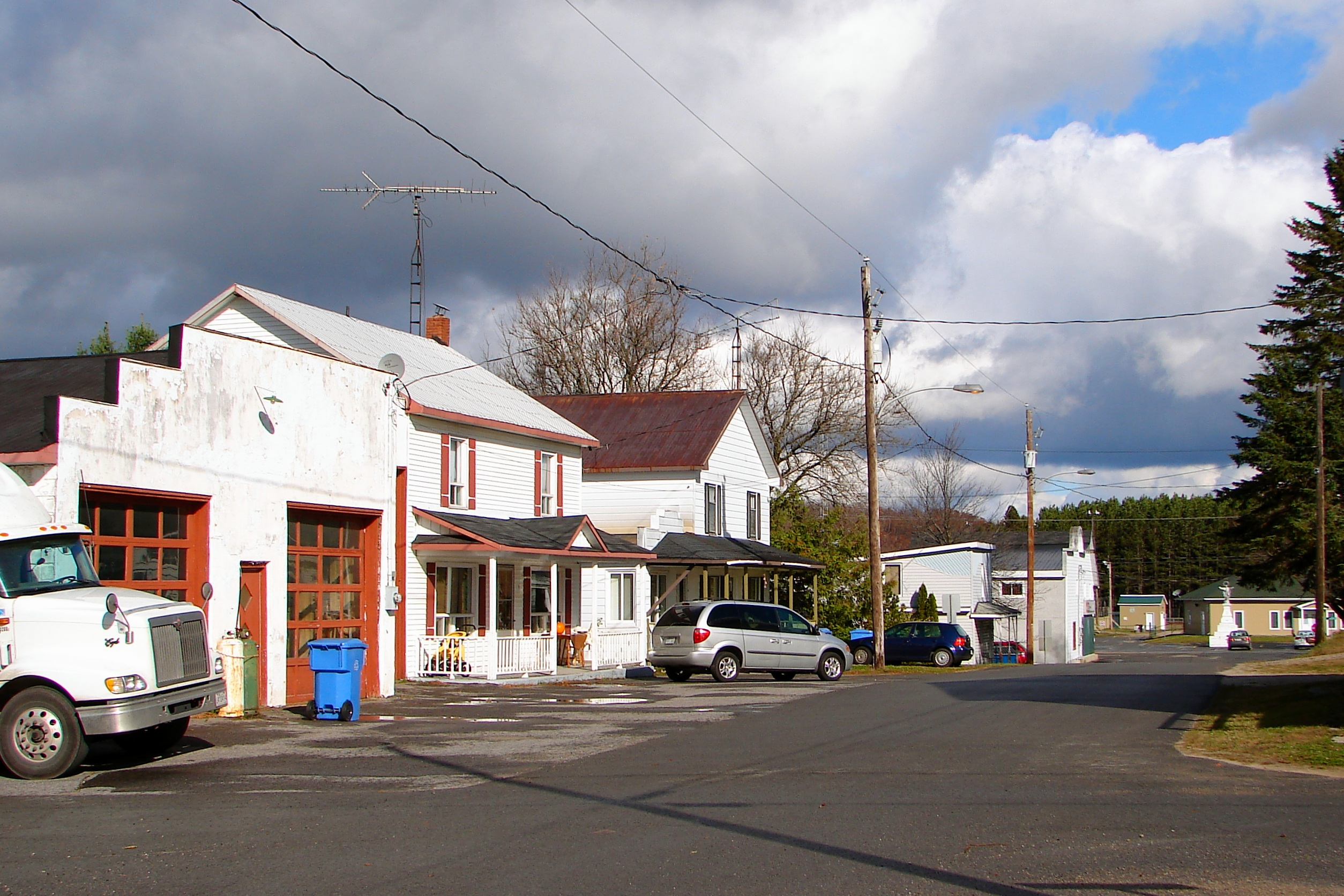

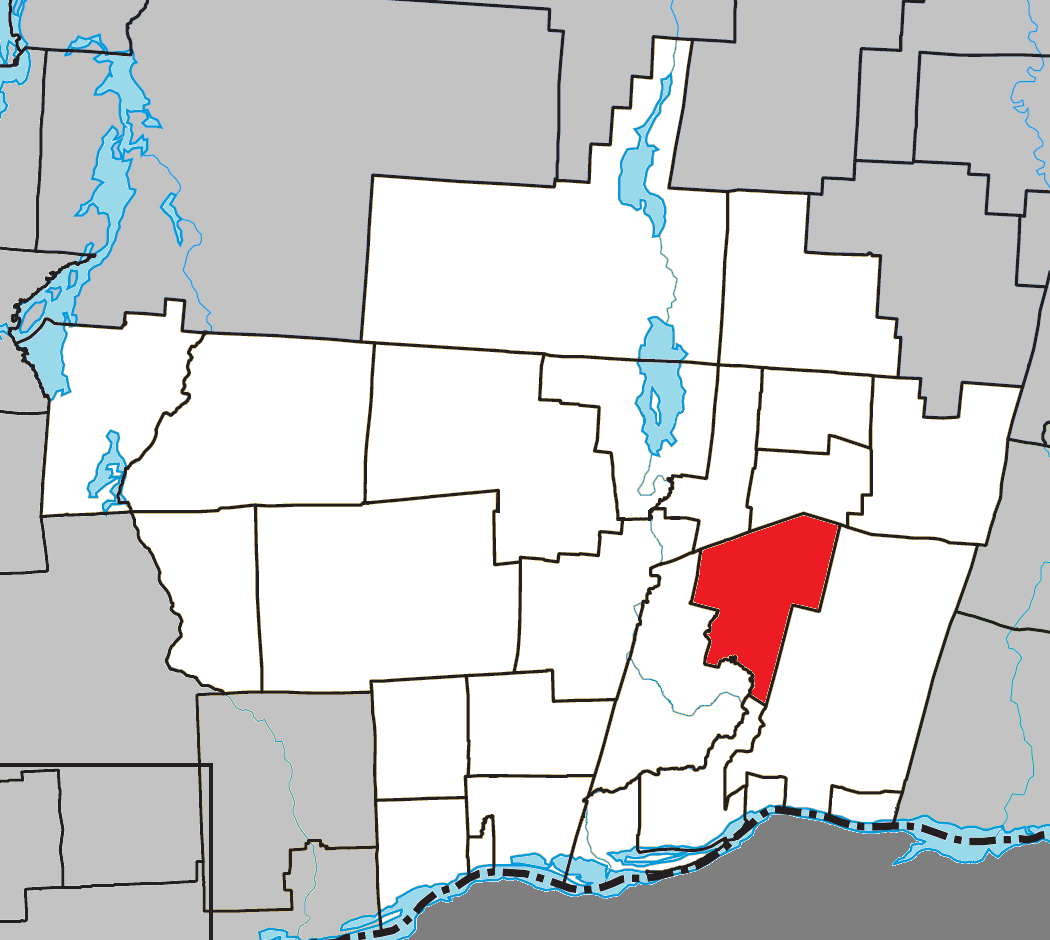
- Location within Papineau RCM

- Location in western Quebec
- Coordinates: 45°49′N 74°58′W
- Country: Canada
- Province: Quebec
- Region: Outaouais
- RCM: Papineau
- Constituted: October 3, 1902

Government
  - Mayor: François Gauthier
  - Federal riding: Argenteuil—La Petite-Nation
  - Prov. riding: Papineau

Area
  - Total: 107.50 km^{2} (41.51 sq mi)
  - Land: 106.62 km^{2} (41.17 sq mi)

Population (2016)
  - Total: 648
  - Density: 6.1/km^{2} (16/sq mi)
  - Pop 2011-2016: ▼9.7%
  - Dwellings: 414
- Time zone: UTC−5 (EST)
  - Summer (DST): UTC−4 (EDT)
- Postal code(s): J0V 1P0
- Area code: 819
- Highways: R-323
- Website: www.notredamedelapaix.qc.ca

Notre-Dame-de-la-Paix (French pronunciation: [nɔtʁə dam də la pɛ], lit. 'Our Lady of Peace') is a town and municipality in the Outaouais region of Quebec, Canada, part of the Papineau Regional County Municipality.

== History ==
In 1902, the municipality was formed out of sections of Notre-Dame-de-Bon-Secours and Saint-André-Avellin. Although it remains unclear what specific event is referred to in the name of this parish municipality, it followed the theme of municipal names in the Outaouais dedicated to the Virgin Mary, probably due to the Missionary Oblates of Mary Immaculate, who were missionaries and pastors throughout the region.

In October 2003, the Parish Municipality of Notre-Dame-de-la-Paix changed statutes and became the Municipality of Notre-Dame-de-la-Paix.

== Demographics ==
Canada census – Notre-Dame-de-la-Paix community profile

	2021	2016	2011
Population	675 (+4.2% from 2016)	648 (-9.7% from 2011)	718 (-0.1% from 2006)
Land area	105.96 km^{2} (40.91 sq mi)	106.62 km^{2} (41.17 sq mi)	105.62 km^{2} (40.78 sq mi)
Population density	6.4/km^{2} (17/sq mi)	6.1/km^{2} (16/sq mi)	6.8/km^{2} (18/sq mi)
Median age	50 (M: 49.6, F: 50.4)	49.7 (M: 49.7, F: 49.7)	48.3 (M: 48.8, F: 47.5)
Private dwellings	300 (total)	414 (total)	433 (total)
Median household income		$43,264	$29,935

References: 2021 2016 2011

Historical census populations – Notre-Dame-de-la-Paix, Quebec
Year	Pop.	±%
1986	693	—
1991	662	−4.5%
1996	688	+3.9%
2001	689	+0.1%
2006	719	+4.4%
2011	718	−0.1%
2016	648	−9.7%
Source: Statistics Canada

Mother tongue:

- English as first language: 2.4%
- French as first language: 96.0%
- English and French as first language: 0%
- Other as first language: 0%

== Education ==
Sir Wilfrid Laurier School Board operates Anglophone public schools:

- Laurentian Regional High School in Lachute
