= Mulgrave-et-Derry =

- Municipality
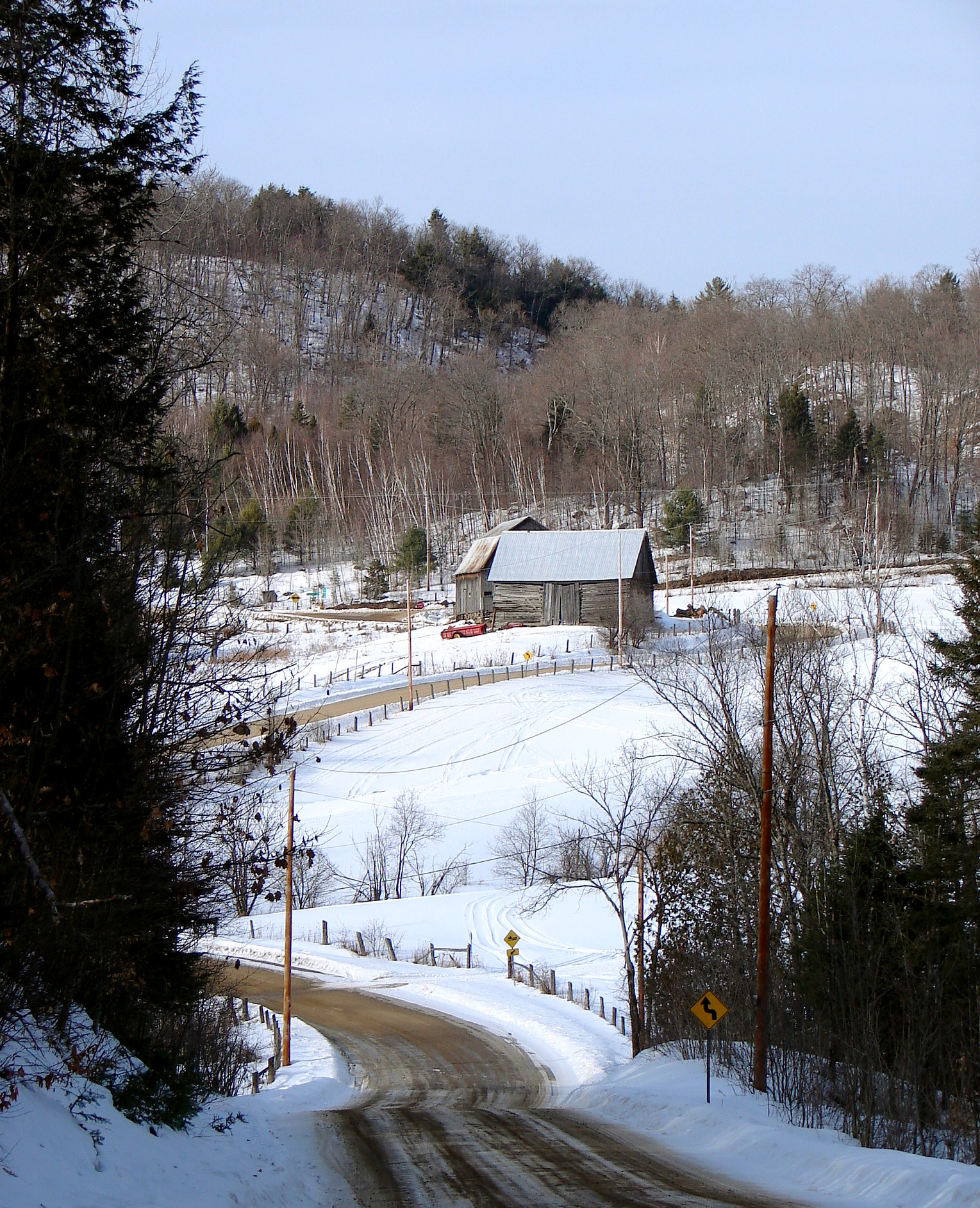
- Quebec Route 315 through Blanche, Mulgrave-et-Derry

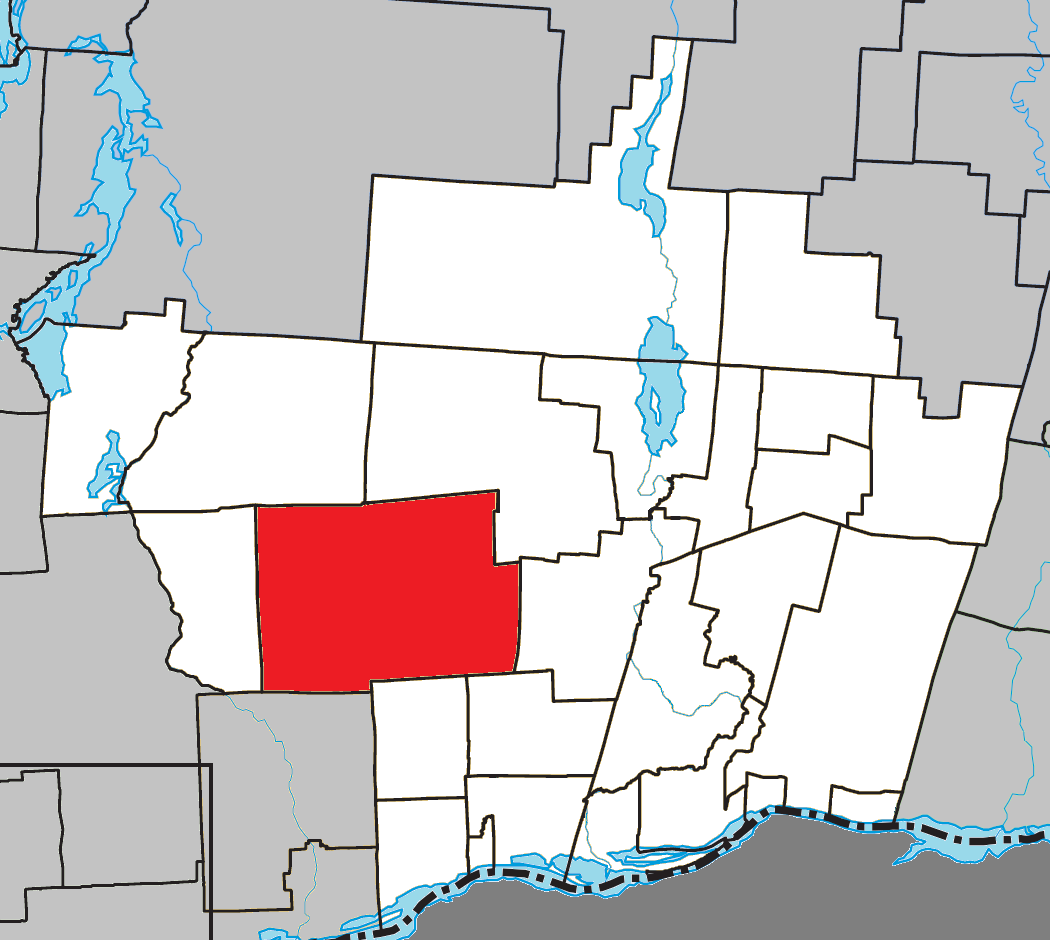
- Location within Papineau RCM

- Location in western Quebec
- Coordinates: 45°47′N 75°22′W
- Country: Canada
- Province: Quebec
- Region: Outaouais
- RCM: Papineau
- Constituted: January 1, 1870

Government
  - Mayor: Michael Kane
  - Federal riding: Argenteuil—La Petite-Nation
  - Prov. riding: Papineau

Area
  - Total: 319.00 km^{2} (123.17 sq mi)
  - Land: 289.52 km^{2} (111.78 sq mi)

Population (2021)
  - Total: 461
  - Density: 1.6/km^{2} (4.1/sq mi)
  - Pop 2016-2021: ▲24.9%
  - Dwellings: 476
- Time zone: UTC−5 (EST)
  - Summer (DST): UTC−4 (EDT)
- Postal code(s): J8L 2H2
- Area code: 819
- Highways: R-315
- Website: www.mulgrave-derry.ca

Mulgrave-et-Derry, is a village north of Mayo, in the Papineau Regional County Municipality, Quebec, Canada. The region includes a number of notable lakes, including Gull Lake, Hawk Lake, Lady Lake, Smallian Lake, Lac St. Sixte, Lac La Blanche and Little Lake. Community buildings include the Hill and Gully Riders Snowmobile Club, St. Matthew's Evangelical Lutheran Church, and Our Lady of Light Roman Catholic Church (now Our Lady of Light Cultural Centre).

The Wallingford-Back mine, once one of Canada's largest sources of quartz, is located in Mulgrave-et-Derry. It became a tourist destination after ceasing operations in the 1970s, but also became unsafe; in 2017, it was barricaded.

== Demographics ==
Canada census – Mulgrave-et-Derry community profile

	2021	2016	2011
Population	461 (+24.9% from 2016)	369 (0.8% from 2011)	366 (% from 2006)
Land area	289.52 km^{2} (111.78 sq mi)	293.75 km^{2} (113.42 sq mi)	295.99 km^{2} (114.28 sq mi)
Population density	1.6/km^{2} (4.1/sq mi)	1.3/km^{2} (3.4/sq mi)	1.2/km^{2} (3.1/sq mi)
Median age	55.6 (M: 56.8, F: 53.6)	55.8 (M: 55.8, F: 55.6)	52.3 (M: 52.8, F: 51.8)
Private dwellings	230 (total)	396 (total)	428 (total)
Median household income	$70,000	$57,728

References: 2021 2016 2011

Historical census populations – Mulgrave-et-Derry, Quebec
Year	Pop.	±%
1986	225	—
1991	233	+3.6%
1996	250	+7.3%
2001	235	−6.0%
2006	389	+65.5%
2011	366	−5.9%
2016	369	+0.8%
2021	461	+24.9%
The 2011 population is based on the revised count. Source: Statistics Canada

== Arms ==
Coat of arms of Mulgrave-et-Derry

Notes
Granted 15 September 2022
Crest
A cerulean warbler singing proper perched on an oak branch fructed Or leaved Vert.
Escutcheon
Per pale Vert and Or on a pile reversed throughout per pale Argent and Azure a log cabin above a bar gemel wavy counterchanged.
Supporters
Two black bears proper, that to the dexter supporting on its shoulder a pickaxe Or its blade Argent, that to the sinister supporting on its shoulder an axe Or its blade Argent, both standing on a grassy mount set with bloodroot wildflowers proper and a split-rail fence Or.
Motto
Ad Harmoniam Cum Natura (Towards Harmony With Nature)
Badge
A lozenge per pale Argent and Azure charged with a snowmobile above a bar gemel wavy counterchanged and surmounting an annulus per pale Azure and Argent edged and inscribed with the Motto counterchanged.

== See also ==
- List of anglophone communities in Quebec
