= Lac-Simon, Outaouais =

Lac-Simon
- Municipality
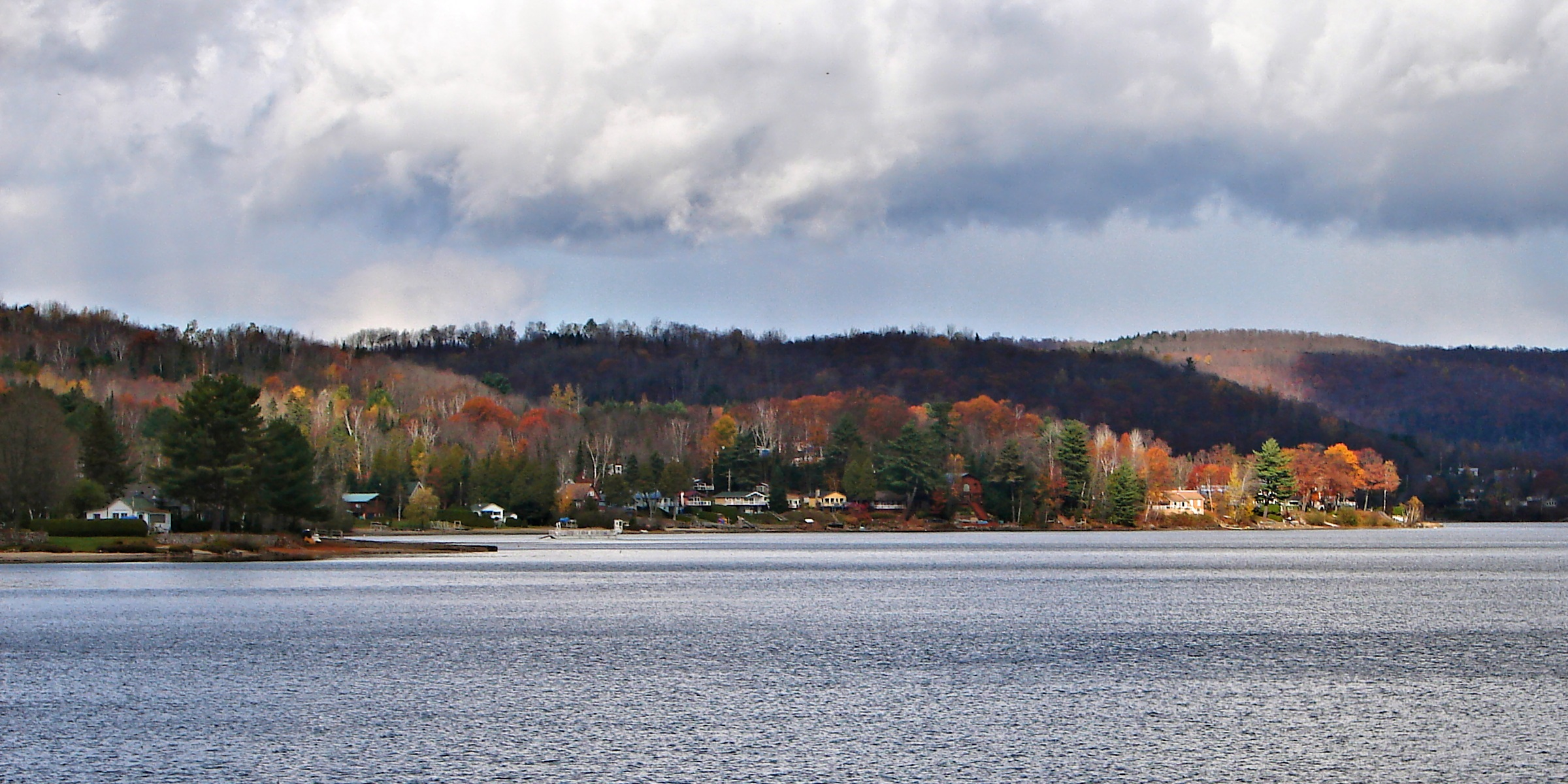

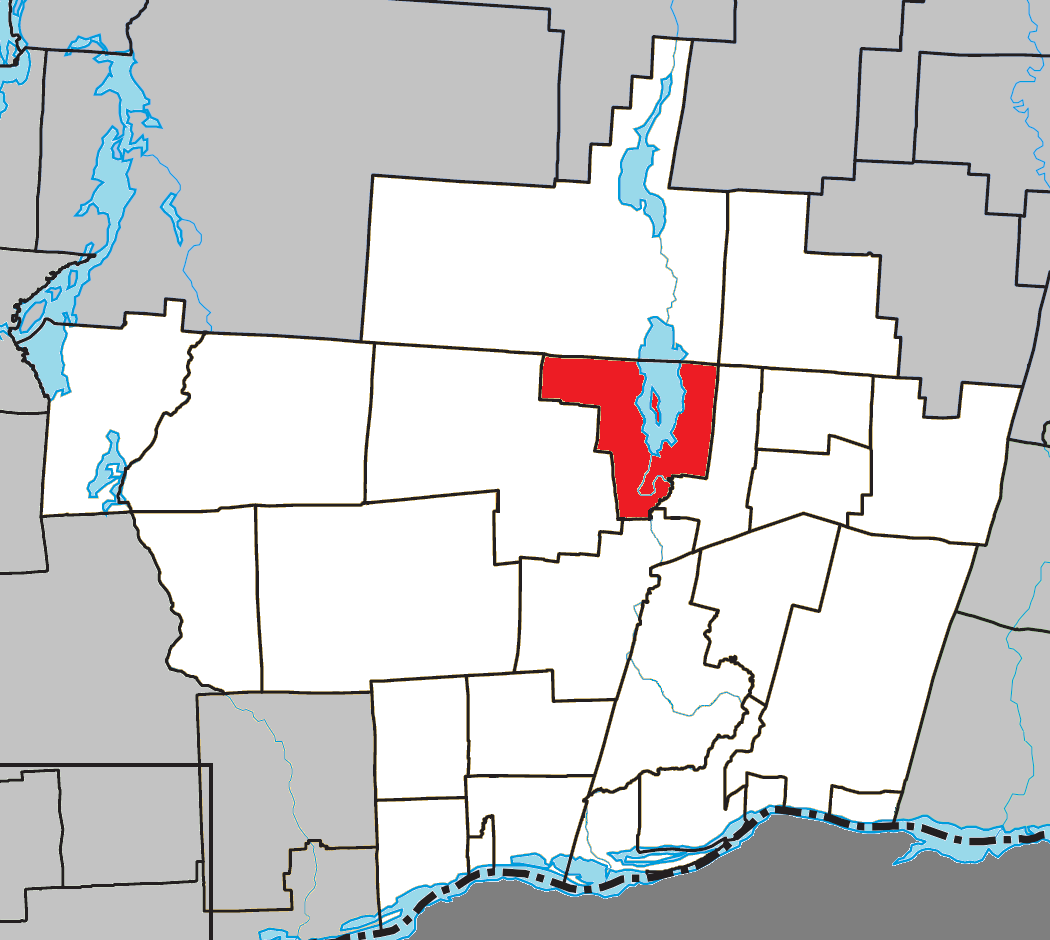
- Location within Papineau RCM

- Location in western Quebec
- Coordinates: 45°54′N 75°06′W
- Country: Canada
- Province: Quebec
- Region: Outaouais
- RCM: Papineau
- Settled: 1845
- Constituted: January 1, 1881
- Named for: Marie-Louise Cimon

Government
  - Mayor: Gaston A. Tremblay
  - Federal riding: Argenteuil—La Petite-Nation
  - Prov. riding: Papineau

Area
  - Total: 121.90 km^{2} (47.07 sq mi)
  - Land: 95.65 km^{2} (36.93 sq mi)

Population (2021)
  - Total: 1,057
  - Density: 11.1/km^{2} (29/sq mi)
  - Pop 2016-2021: ▲12%
  - Dwellings: 1,304
- Time zone: UTC−5 (EST)
  - Summer (DST): UTC−4 (EDT)
- Postal code(s): J0V 1E0
- Area code: 819
- Highways: R-315; R-321
- Website: www.lac-simon.net

Lac-Simon (French pronunciation: [lak simɔ̃]) is a town and municipality in the Outaouais region of Quebec, Canada, part of the Papineau Regional County Municipality.

It is known for its sandy beaches on Lake Simon and provides services to vacationers and campers.

== History ==
In 1845, the Métis Amable LeBlanc and his wife Marie-Louise Cimon, the niece of Basile Outik, chief of the Oka Indian tribe, went to settle on an island in the middle of a lake located 121 kilometres (75 mi) north-west of Oka. Eight families left with him to this region where hunting and fishing were very good. Three of these families were related to the parents of his wife and from then on, the residents of Oka, and later those of Montebello, called this lake "Lake Cimon", which became "Lake Simon". The largest island in the lake is now called White Duck Island (Île du Canard Blanc) in honour of Amable LeBlanc who was nicknamed "White Duck" in reference to his slightly lighter skin colour as compared to his native relatives.

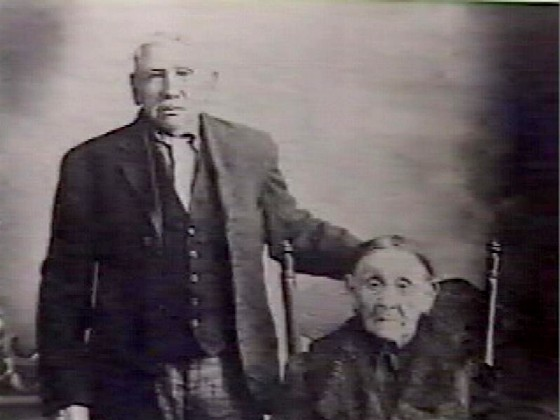
Amable "White Duck" LeBlanc and his wife Marie-Louise Cimon

Starting in 1852, Franco-Catholic colonists began to settle at the lake, working as log drivers, loggers, or farmers. In 1857, a mission was established. In 1864, Hartwell Township is formed (named after a place in central Buckinghamshire, England), followed a few years later by the United Township Municipality of Hartwell-et-Suffolk. In 1880, the mission attained the status of parish under the name of Saint-Felix-de-Valois.

In 1881, Hartwell-et-Suffolk separated and formed the Township Municipality of Hartwell and the Township Municipality of Suffolk. In 1893, Hartwell was merged with Preston Township, becoming the United Township Municipality of Hartwell-et-Preston.

In 1936, the united townships were separated again and formed the Township Municipality of Hartwell and the Municipality of Duhamel. In 1958, Hartwell became the Parish Municipality of Chénéville and finally became the Municipality of Lac-Simon in 1965.

Lac-Simon's development as a resort area began in the 1950s, and accelerated when the provincial government acquired sites bordering the lake and opened a campground. Today, Lac-Simon is a popular year-round vacation resort.

== Demographics ==
Canada census – Lac-Simon community profile

	2021	2016	2011
Population	1,057 (+12.0% from 2016)	944 (-4.1% from 2011)	984 (13.2% from 2006)
Land area	95.65 km^{2} (36.93 sq mi)	97.48 km^{2} (37.64 sq mi)	97.37 km^{2} (37.59 sq mi)
Population density	11.1/km^{2} (29/sq mi)	9.7/km^{2} (25/sq mi)	10.1/km^{2} (26/sq mi)
Median age	60.0 (M: 60.4, F: 59.2)	59.6 (M: 60.4, F: 58.8)	57.5 (M: 58.0, F: 56.9)
Private dwellings	1,304 (total) 554 (occupied)	1,373 (total)	1,145 (total)
Median household income	$68,500	$57,088

References: 2021 2016 2011

Historical census populations – Lac-Simon, Quebec
Year	Pop.	±%
1986	471	—
1991	583	+23.8%
1996	667	+14.4%
2001	683	+2.4%
2006	869	+27.2%
2011	984	+13.2%
2016	944	−4.1%
2021	1,057	+12.0%

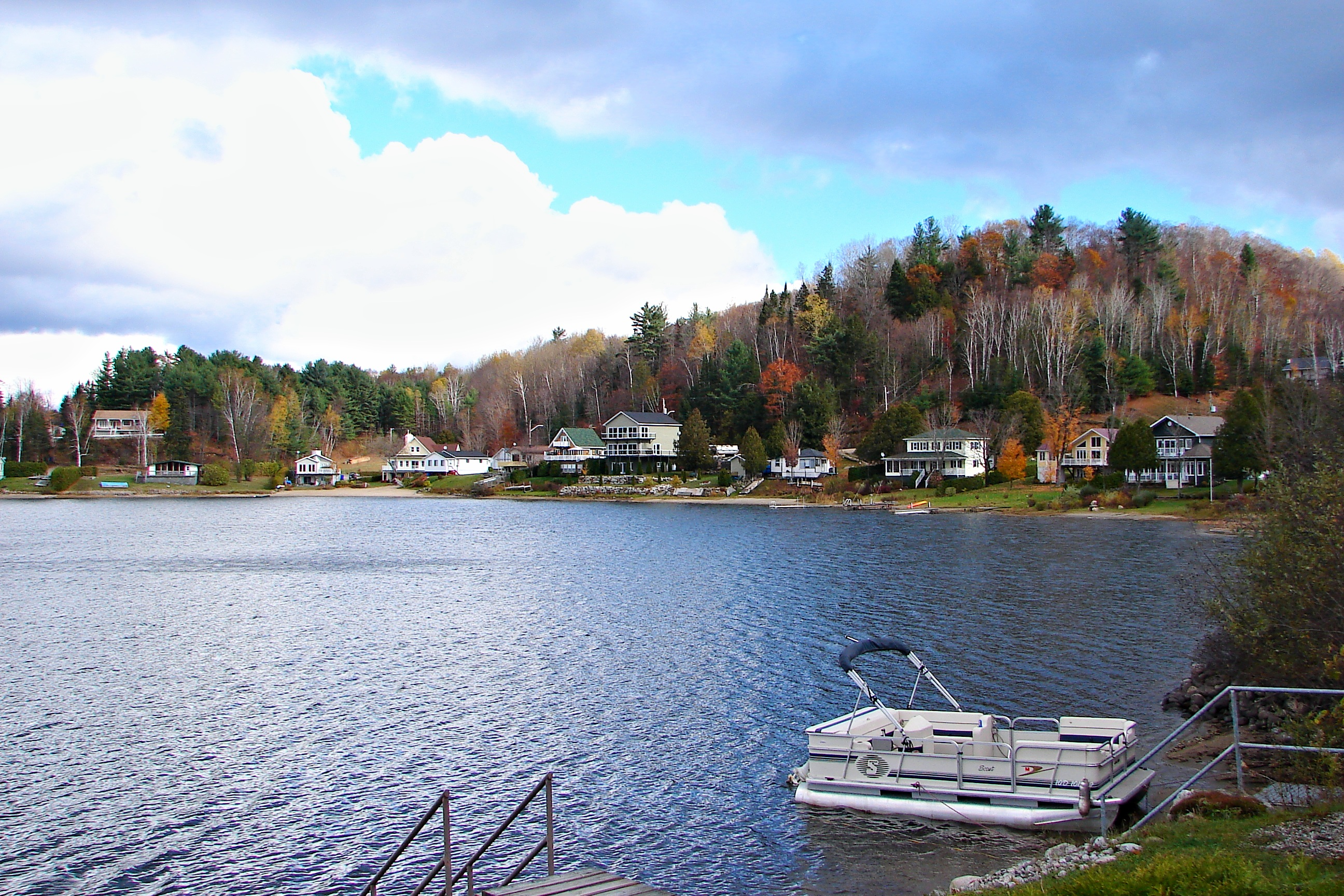
Lac-Simon

Mother tongue:

- English as first language: 3.8%
- French as first language: 94.8%
- English and French as first language: 0.5%
- Other as first language: 0.9%
