= Saint-Émile-de-Suffolk =

- Municipality
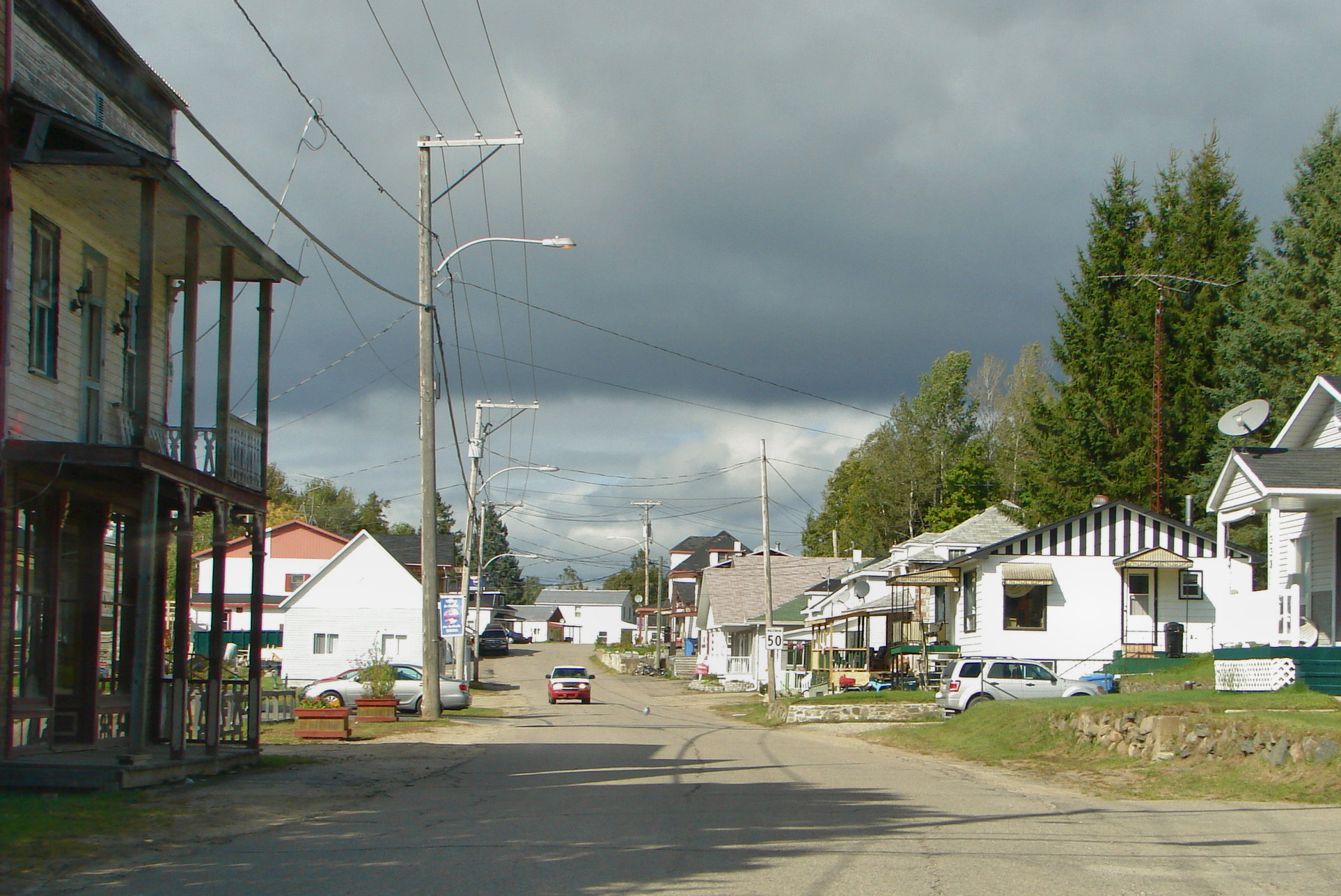
- Motto: Une municiplalité en Outaouais à découvrir. ("A municipality in Outaouais to discover")
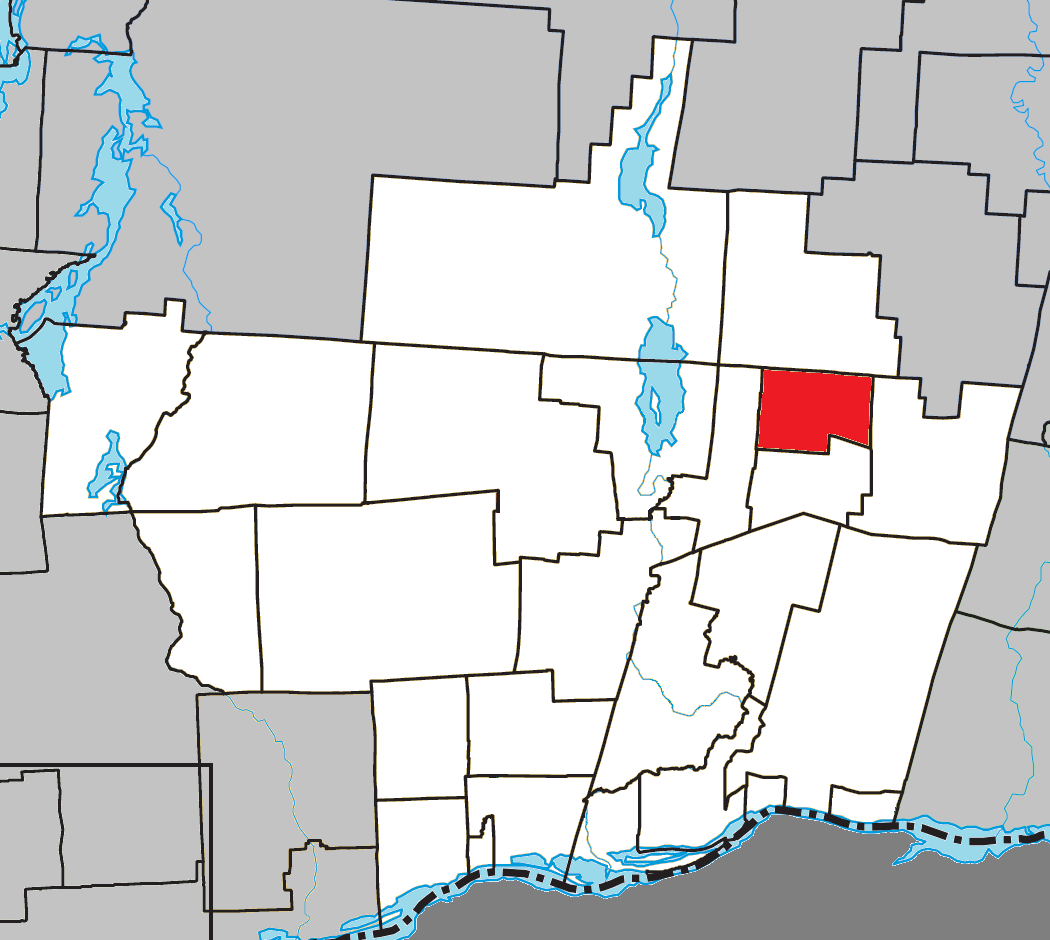
- Location within Papineau RCM

- Location in western Quebec
- Coordinates: 45°56′N 74°55′W
- Country: Canada
- Province: Quebec
- Region: Outaouais
- RCM: Papineau
- Settled: 1860s
- Constituted: January 1, 1881

Government
  - Mayor: Hugo Desormeaux
  - Federal riding: Argenteuil—La Petite-Nation
  - Prov. riding: Papineau

Area
  - Total: 59.20 km^{2} (22.86 sq mi)
  - Land: 55.68 km^{2} (21.50 sq mi)

Population (2021)
  - Total: 512
  - Density: 9.2/km^{2} (24/sq mi)
  - Pop 2016-2021: ▲7.3%
  - Dwellings: 416
- Time zone: UTC−5 (EST)
  - Summer (DST): UTC−4 (EDT)
- Postal code(s): J0T 1K0, J0V 1Y0
- Area code: 819
- Highways: R-323
- Website: www.st-emile-de-suffolk.com

Saint-Émile-de-Suffolk is a municipality in the Outaouais region of Quebec, Canada, part of the Papineau Regional County Municipality. Until 1994 it was known as United Township Municipality of Suffolk-et-Addington.

This farming community, 40 kilometres (25 mi) north of Montebello, is often visited by cottage vacationers for hunting and fishing in the numerous lakes of the area.

== Geography ==
The area is characterized by rugged terrain of the Laurentian Mountains, marked here and there by mountains that rise more than 400 meters (1,300 ft) above sea level. Its principal streams are the Little Rouge River and the Suffolk Creek that feeds it, the first being a tributary of the Petite-Nation River.

== History ==
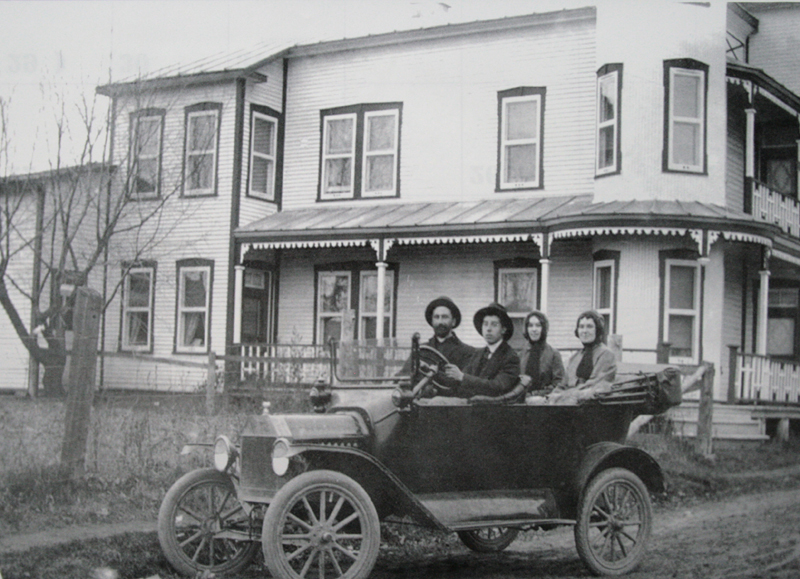
General store in St-Émile-de-Suffolk in 1920

Suffolk Township (named after the county in England) was already on the Gale and Duberger map of 1795, but not officially established until 1874. Municipally it was part of the United Township Municipality of Hartwell-et-Suffolk until 1880 when the municipality separated and the Township Municipality of Suffolk was formed, taking effect on January 1, 1881.

In 1885, Addington Township (named after Henry Addington, 1st Viscount Sidmouth) was merged with Suffolk Township, creating the United Township Municipality of Suffolk-et-Addington. This county consisted of Vinoy, Namur, Saint-Émile, Lac-des-Plages and part of Vendée.

In 1889, the Parish of Saint-Émile-de-Suffolk was formed. This name paid tribute to Émile Quesnel of Saint-Andre-Avellin, who had been particularly generous toward the early settlers of the area.

Piece by piece, portions of the united township were detached to form new municipalities: Vinoy in 1920 (which became part of Chénéville in 1996), Lac-des-Plages in 1950, and finally Namur in 1964.

In 1994, the name and status were changed to that of Municipality of Saint-Émile-de-Suffolk.

== Demographics ==
Canada census – Saint-Émile-de-Suffolk community profile

| | 2021 | 2016 | 2011 |
| Population | 512 (+7.3% from 2016) | 477 (-15.7% from 2011) | 566 (5.4% from 2006) |
| Land area | 55.68 km^{2} (21.50 sq mi) | 56.68 km^{2} (21.88 sq mi) | 58.40 km^{2} (22.55 sq mi) |
| Population density | 9.2/km^{2} (24/sq mi) | 8.4/km^{2} (22/sq mi) | 9.7/km^{2} (25/sq mi) |
| Median age | 54.4 (M: 55.2, F: 53.2) | 54.6 (M: 54.8, F: 54.4) | 49.5 (M: 50.0, F: 49.0) |
| Private dwellings | 416 (total) | 433 (total) | 410 (total) |
| Median household income | | $40,832 |

References: 2021 2016 2011

Historical census populations – Saint-Émile-de-Suffolk, Quebec
| Year | Pop. | ±% |
|---|---|---|
| 1986 | 481 | — |
| 1991 | 491 | +2.1% |
| 1996 | 433 | −11.8% |
| 2001 | 528 | +21.9% |
| 2006 | 537 | +1.7% |
| 2011 | 566 | +5.4% |
| 2016 | 477 | −15.7% |
| 2021 | 512 | +7.3% |
Population amounts are not adjusted for boundary changes. Source: Statistics Canada

== Local government ==
List of former mayors:

- Serge Carrière (2001–2005)
- Martin Blais (2005-2009)
- Michel Samson (2009-2013)
- Hugo Desormeaux (2013–present)

== Education ==
Sir Wilfrid Laurier School Board operates Anglophone public schools:

- Laurentian Regional High School in Lachute
