= Duhamel, Quebec =

Duhamel
- Municipality
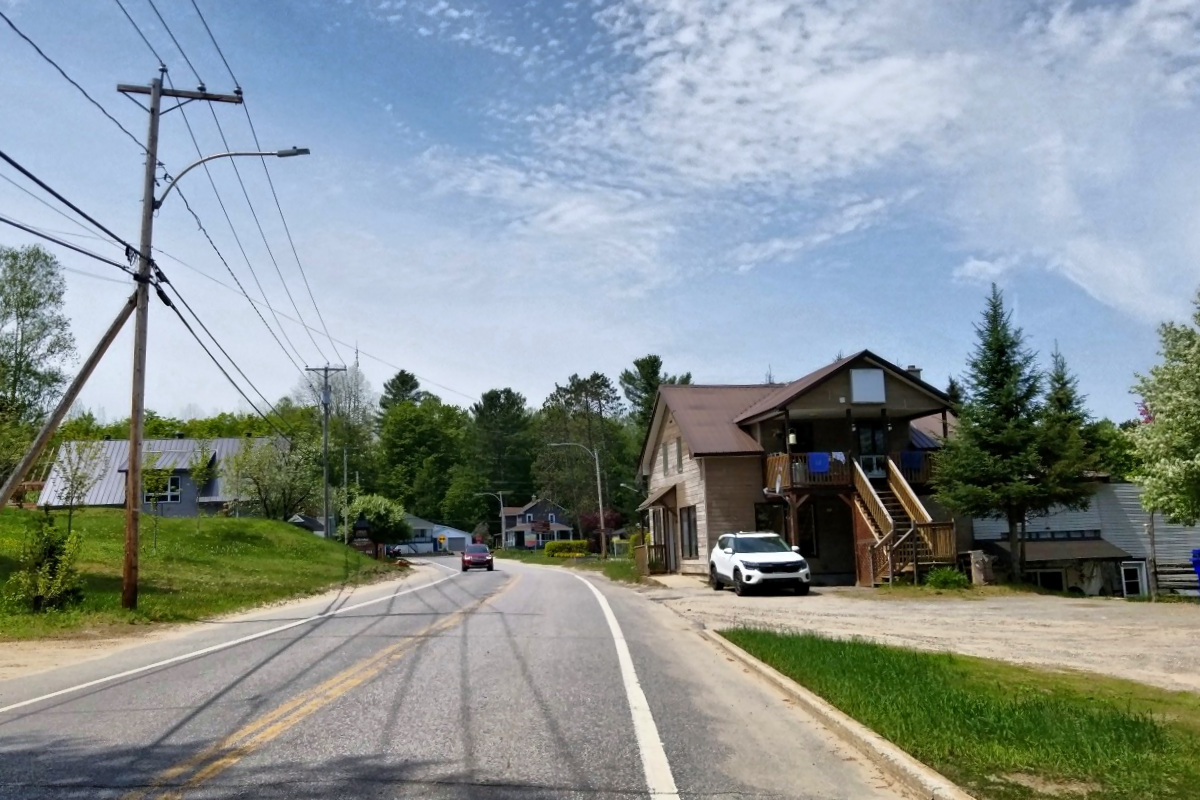

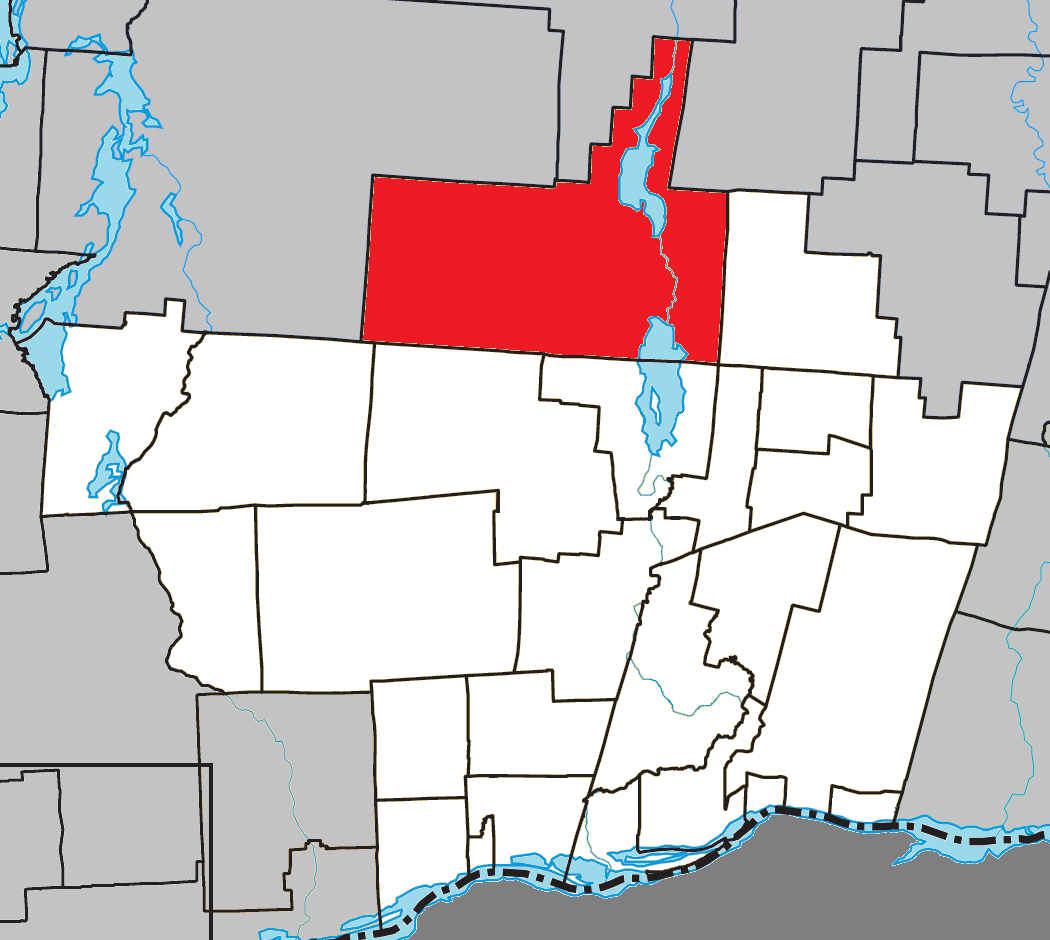
- Location within Papineau RCM

- Location in western Quebec
- Coordinates: 46°01′N 75°05′W
- Country: Canada
- Province: Quebec
- Region: Outaouais
- RCM: Papineau
- Constituted: August 15, 1936

Government
  - Mayor: David Pharand
  - Federal riding: Argenteuil—La Petite-Nation
  - Prov. riding: Papineau

Area
  - Total: 481.90 km^{2} (186.06 sq mi)
  - Land: 427.32 km^{2} (164.99 sq mi)

Population (2021)
  - Total: 487
  - Density: 1.1/km^{2} (2.8/sq mi)
  - Pop (2016-21): ▲13.3%
  - Dwellings: 972
- Time zone: UTC−5 (EST)
  - Summer (DST): UTC−4 (EDT)
- Postal code(s): J0V 1G0
- Area code: 819
- Highways: R-321
- Website: municipalite.duhamel.qc.ca

Duhamel (French pronunciation: [dyamɛl]) is a town and municipality in the Outaouais region of Quebec, Canada. It is the largest municipality in surface area in the Papineau Regional County Municipality.

Its western portion consists mostly of undeveloped Laurentian Hills, part of the Papineau-Labelle Wildlife Reserve. The town itself is located along the Petite-Nation River between Lake Simon and Lake Gagnon.

== History ==
In the mid 19th century, the area's forests were being exploited. Duhamel, which used to be called Preston, formed shortly after when its first settlers were assigned land, while logging continued to be the dominant factor for its colonization. By 1880, a post office existed bearing the name Duhamel, named in honour of Joseph-Thomas Duhamel (1841–1909), second bishop of Ottawa from 1874 to 1909. In 1888, the Mission of Notre-Dame-du-Mont-Carmel opened. In 1892, the Township of Preston was formed (named after Frederick Stanley, 16th Earl of Derby, Baron of Preston, and governor general of Canada from 1888 to 1893).

Starting in 1925, the Singer Company, best known for its sewing machines, built a railway through Duhamel linking Thurso to Lake Montjoie (in Lac-Ernest unorganized territory). The railroad was used until 1980 when it was dismantled and converted to a tourism corridor.

On August 15, 1936, the Municipality of Duhamel was formed when it separated from the United Township Municipality of Hartwell-et-Preston.

On December 21, 1985, Duhamel annexed a portion of the unorganized territories of Lac-du-Sourd and Lac-des-Écorces, and again on October 10, 1998, it annexed the northern portion of Lac-des-Écorces.

== Demographics ==
Canada census – Duhamel community profile

	2021	2016	2011
Population	487 (+13.3% from 2016)	430 (4.4% from 2011)	412 (-14.7% from 2006)
Land area	427.32 km^{2} (164.99 sq mi)	434.57 km^{2} (167.79 sq mi)	434.19 km^{2} (167.64 sq mi)
Population density	1.1/km^{2} (2.8/sq mi)	1.0/km^{2} (2.6/sq mi)	0.9/km^{2} (2.3/sq mi)
Median age	63.6 (M: 64.5, F: 62.0)	59.0 (M: 59.7, F: 58.4)	58.1 (M: 58.0, F: 58.1)
Private dwellings	972 (total) 282 (occupied)	1,001 (total)	884 (total)
Median household income	$63,200	$49,451

Notes: 2021 Population and dwelling figures based on revised count.
References: 2021 2016 2011

Historical census populations – Duhamel, Quebec

Year	Pop.	±%
1941	315	—
1951	424	+34.6%
1956	420	−0.9%
1961	382	−9.0%
1966	344	−9.9%
1971	325	−5.5%

Year	Pop.	±%
1976	286	−12.0%
1981	309	+8.0%
1986	337	+9.1%
1991	394	+16.9%
1996	321	−18.5%
2001	361	+12.5%

Year	Pop.	±%
2006	483	+33.8%
2011	412	−14.7%
2016	430	+4.4%
2021	487	+13.3%

2021 Population figure based on revised count. Population amounts are not adjusted for boundary changes.
Source: Statistics Canada

Mother tongue (2021):

- English as first language: 7.0%
- French as first language: 91.2%
- English and French as first language: 0.9%
- Other as first language: 0.9%

== Local government ==
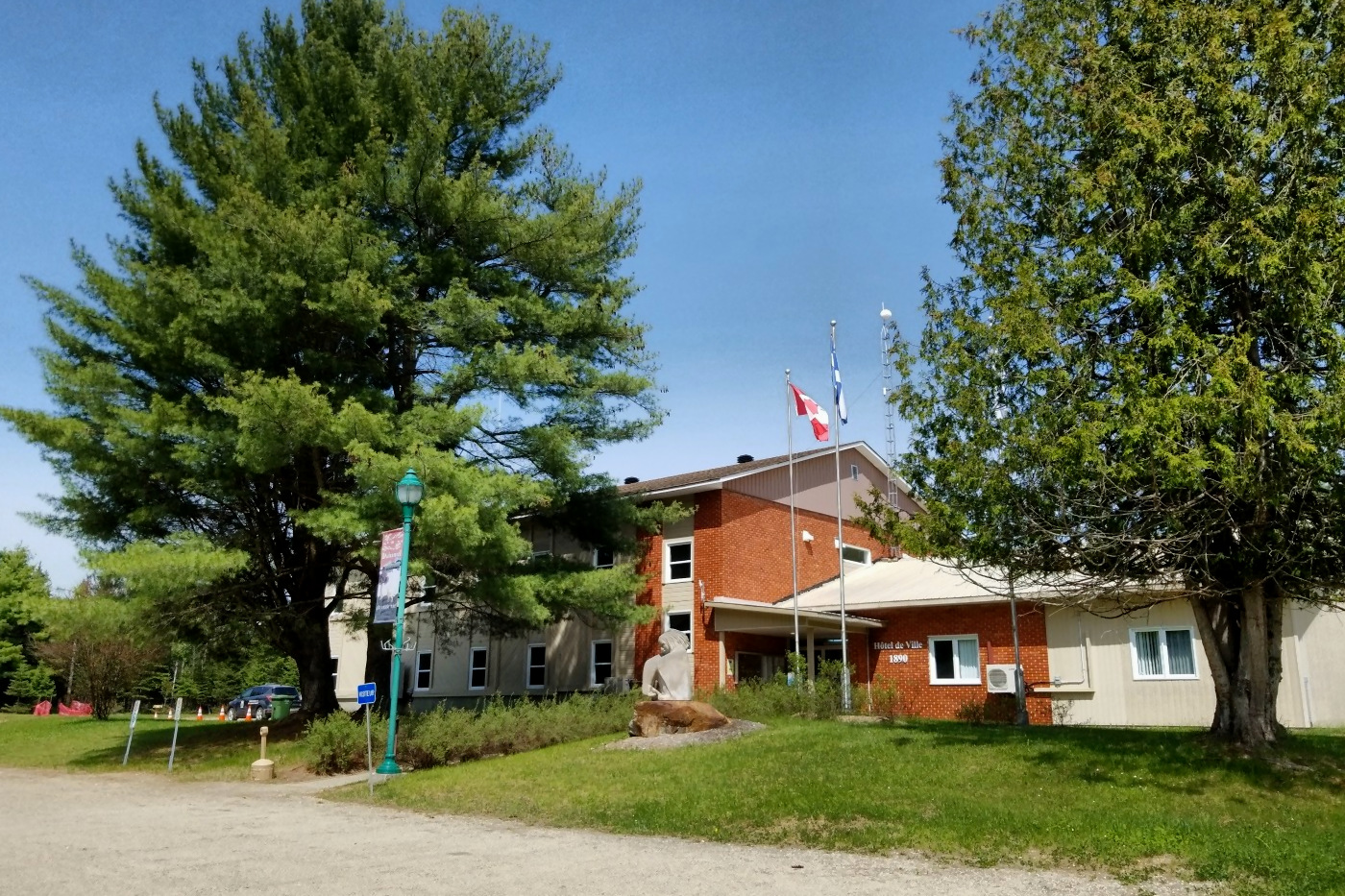
Town hall of Duhamel

Duhamel forms part of the federal electoral district of Argenteuil—La Petite-Nation and has been represented by Stéphane Lauzon of the Liberal Party since 2015. Provincially, Duhamel is part of the Papineau electoral district and is represented by Mathieu Lacombe of the Coalition Avenir Québec since 2018.

Duhamel federal election results
Year	Liberal		Conservative		Bloc Québécois		New Democratic		Green	
2021	36%	105	11%	32	47%	138	4%	11	0%	0
2019	35%	86	15%	36	46%	114	3%	7	1%	3

Duhamel provincial election results
Year	CAQ		Liberal		QC solidaire		Parti Québécois	
2018	47%	126	23%	63	3%	8	24%	64
2014	24%	63	37%	97	5%	13	34%	91

List of former mayors:

- Télesphore Tremblay, 1936 – 1941
- Lionel Ethier, 1941 – 1949
- René Pilon, 1949 – 1950
- Fréréole Filion, 1950 – 1951
- Arthur Lamontagne, 1951 – 1954
- Lionel Éthier, 1954 – 1955
- Camille Poliquin, 1955 – 1976
- Jean Turcot, 1976 – 1979
- Martial Brière, 1979 – 1981
- Yvon Jérôme, 1981 – 1985
- Phil Patry, 1985 – 1997
- Yvon Charlebois, 1997 – 2005
- Richard Chartrand, 2005 – 2009
- David Pharand, 2009 -
