= Lac Nominingue, Quebec =

Lac Nominingue, Quebec may refer to:

- the old name of the municipality of Nominingue, Quebec
- a common name for Grand Lac Nominingue, a lake
- Petit Lac Nominingue, another lake bordering this village
