= Quebec Route 321 =

Highway in Quebec, Canada

Route 321

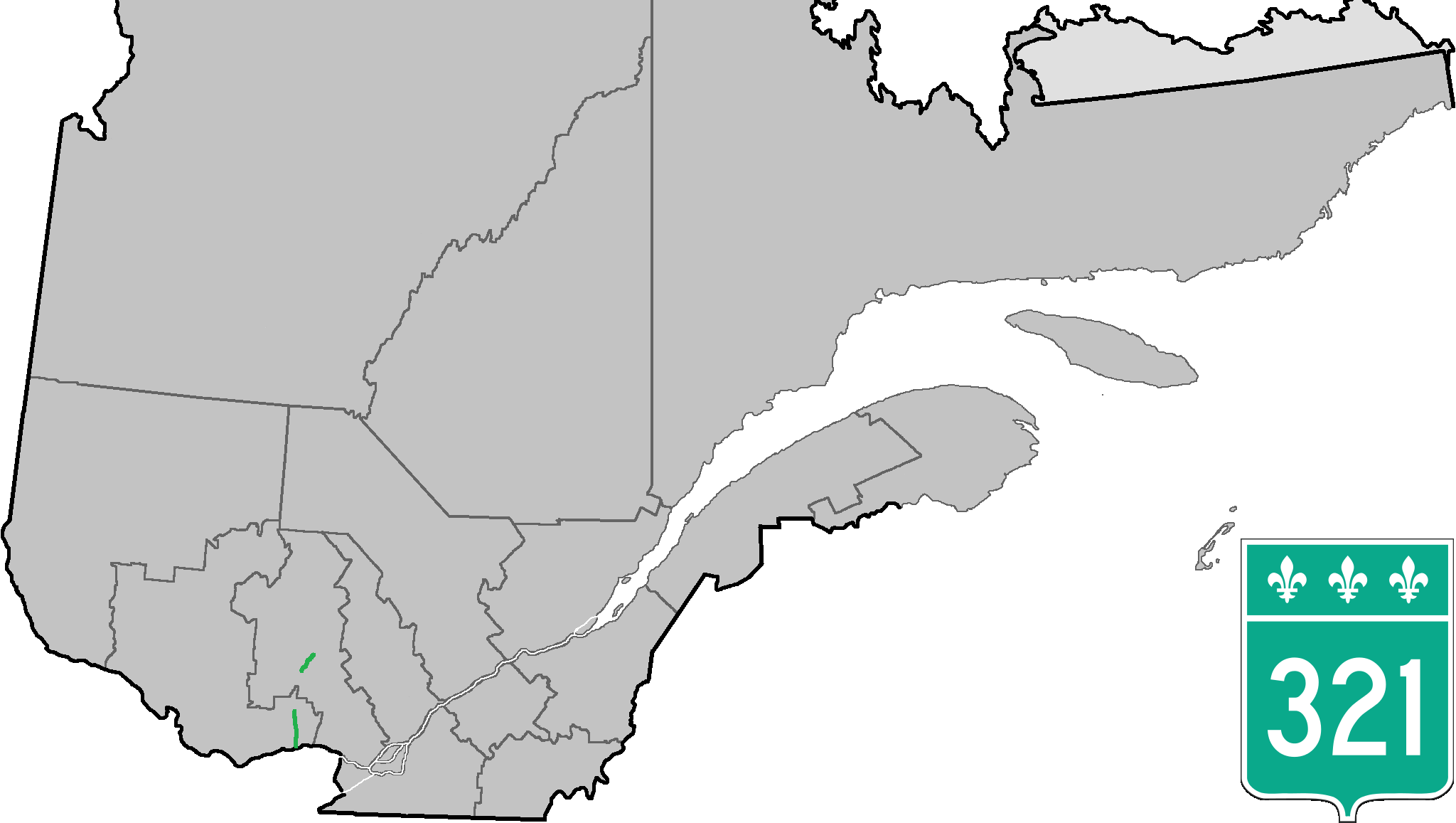

Route information
- Maintained by Transports Québec
- Length: 85.7 km (53.3 mi)

Papineau section
- Length: 52.6 km (32.7 mi)
- South end: R-148 in Papineauville
- Major intersections: A-50 in Papineauville; R-317 in Ripon; R-315 in Chénéville
- North end: Rue Principal in Duhamel

Antoine-Labelle section
- Length: 33.1 km (20.6 mi)
- South end: Chemin Chapleau in Nominingue
- Major intersections: R-117 (TCH) in Rivière-Rouge
- North end: Chemin des Îles in L'Ascension

Location
- Country: Canada
- Province: Quebec

Highway system
- Quebec provincial highways; Autoroutes; List; Former
| ← R-317 | → R-323 |

Route 321 is a regional road in Quebec, Canada, that consists of two unconnected sections: one in Papineau Regional County Municipality that runs from Papineauville to Duhamel, and a second section of the road goes from Nominingue to L'Ascension in the Antoine-Labelle Regional County Municipality; there's 67 to 72 km in between (depending on the route).

The portion north of Chénéville in Papineau RCM is still unmarked on some maps, but it is signed on the road, and is very sinuous. On most of the Chénéville-Duhamel part, it is impossible to reach the 90 km/h speed. In fact it is most of the time a 50–70 km/h speed limit road. It is frequented by campers who go to the Lac Simon recreational center during the summer.

== Papineau section ==
The entire route is in Papineau RCM.

| Location | km | mi | Destinations | Notes |
|---|---|---|---|---|
| Papineauville | 0.0 | 0.0 | R-148 – Plaisance, Montebello | |
| Saint-André-Avellin | 14.0 | 8.7 | Rue Sainte-Julie Est – Notre-Dame-de-la-Paix | |
| Ripon | 26.6 | 16.5 | R-317 south – Ripon | Northern terminus of Route 317 |
| Chénéville | 33.9 | 21.1 | R-315 – Lac-Simon, Namur | |
| Duhamel | 52.6 | 32.7 | Rue Principale – Papineau-Labelle Wildlife Reserve | |
1.000 mi = 1.609 km; 1.000 km = 0.621 mi

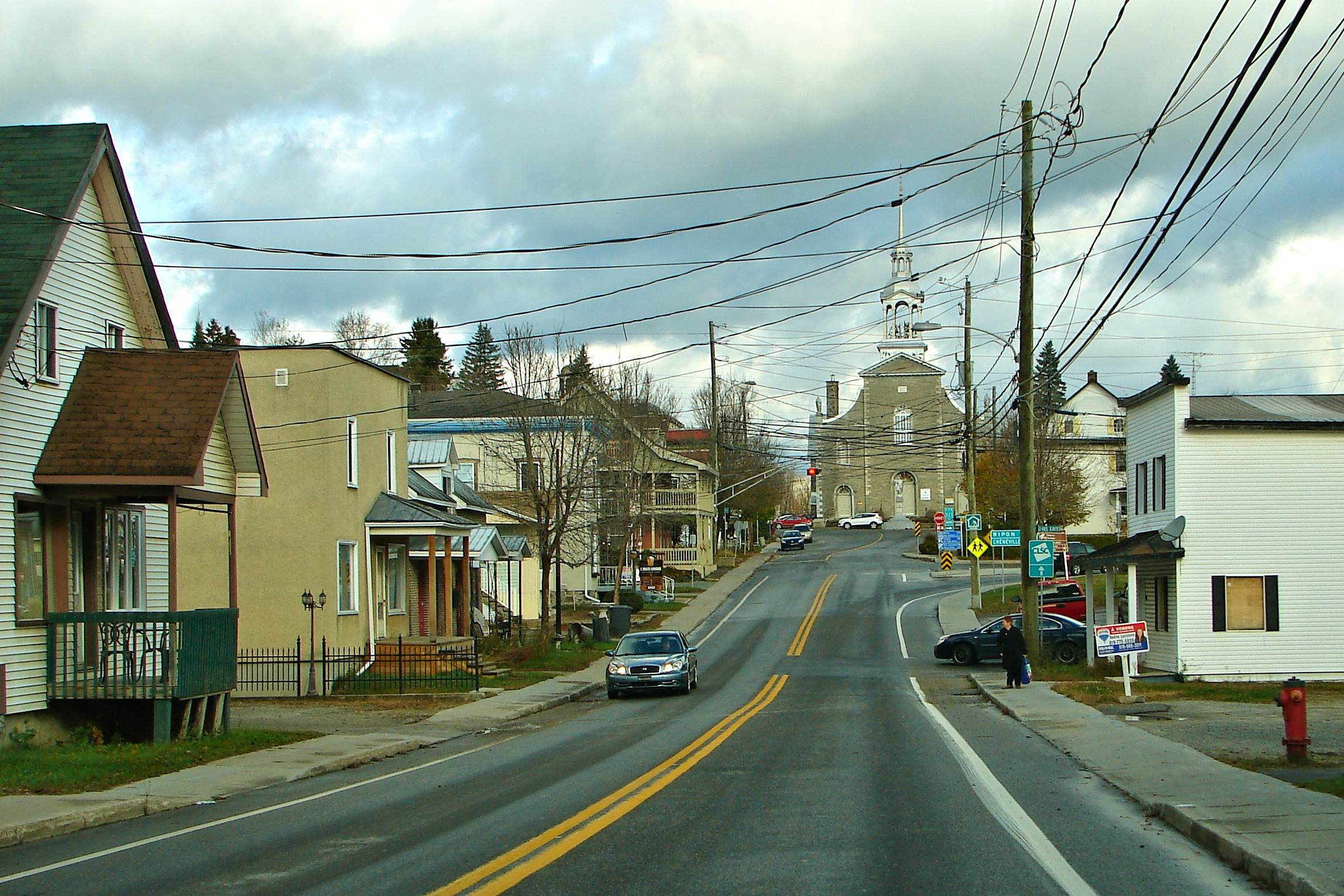
Route 321 through St-André-Avellin

== Antoine-Labelle section ==
The entire route is in Antoine-Labelle RCM.

| Location | km | mi | Destinations | Notes |
|---|---|---|---|---|
| Nominingue | 0.0 | 0.0 | Chemin Chapleau – Lac-Saguay, Papineau-Labelle Wildlife Reserve | |
| Rivière-Rouge | 14.5– 14.6 | 9.0– 9.1 | R-117 (TCH) – L'Annonciation, Sainte-Véronique | |
| L'Ascension | 33.1 | 20.6 | Chemin des Îles north – Rouge-Matawin Wildlife Reserve | |
1.000 mi = 1.609 km; 1.000 km = 0.621 mi

== See also ==
- List of Quebec provincial highways
