= Nominingue =

- Municipality
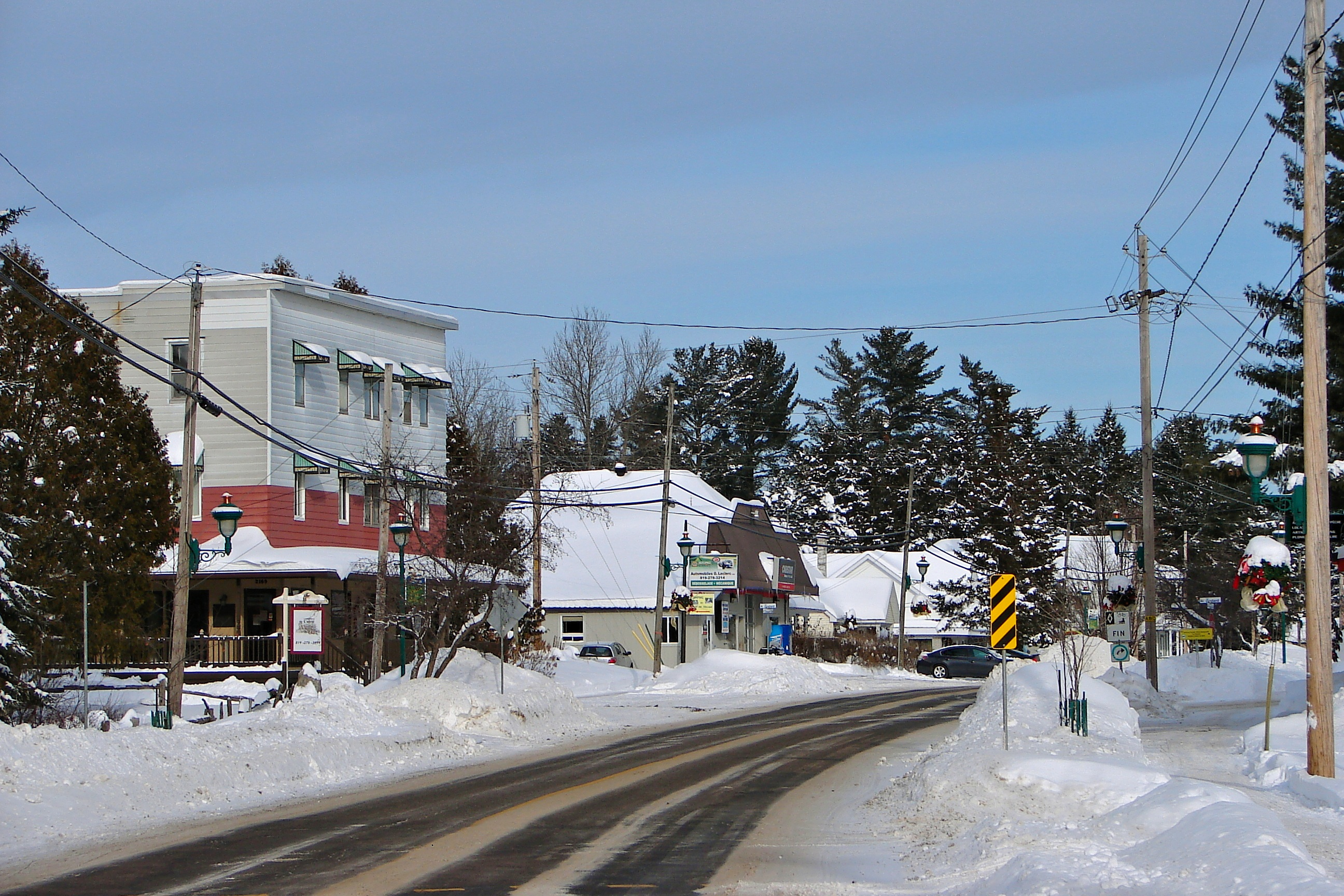

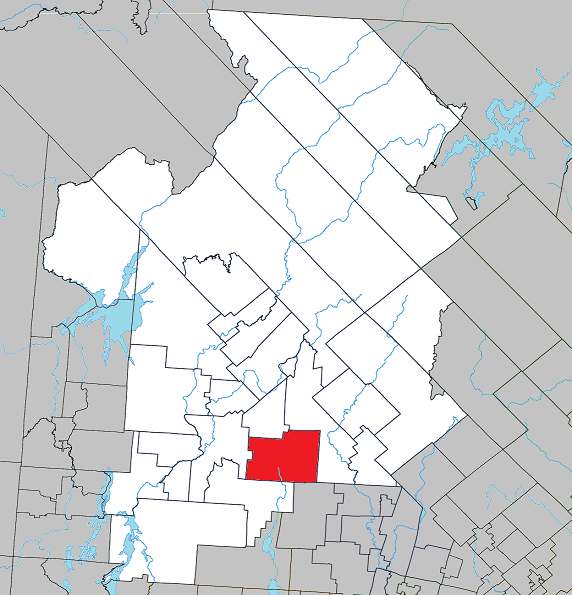
- Location within Antoine-Labelle RCM

- Location in central Quebec
- Coordinates: 46°24′N 75°02′W
- Country: Canada
- Province: Quebec
- Region: Laurentides
- RCM: Antoine-Labelle
- Settled: 1883
- Constituted: October 30, 1971

Government
  - Mayor: Francine Létourneau
  - Federal riding: Laurentides—Labelle
  - Prov. riding: Labelle

Area
  - Total: 360.86 km^{2} (139.33 sq mi)
  - Land: 303.89 km^{2} (117.33 sq mi)

Population (2021)
  - Total: 2,255
  - Density: 7.4/km^{2} (19/sq mi)
  - Pop. (2016-21): ▲5.5%
  - Dwellings: 1,937
- Time zone: UTC−5 (EST)
  - Summer (DST): UTC−4 (EDT)
- Postal code(s): J0W 1R0
- Area code: 819
- Highways: R-117 (TCH); R-321
- Website: nominingue.ca

Nominingue (French pronunciation: [nɔminɛ̃ɡ]) is a small village and municipality located 200 kilometres (120 mi) north of Montreal, Quebec, Canada, in the Laurentian Mountains. It was formerly called Lac-Nominingue, but changed name on September 16, 2000.

Nominingue is located along Route 117, between Mont-Laurier and Rivière-Rouge, and is near the International Airport of Rivière-Rouge/Mont-Tremblant.

It is surrounded by dozens of lakes, including Petit and Grand Lac Nominingue, Lac des Grandes Baies, and Lac Sainte-Marie, as well as a forest. It is near Papineau-Labelle Wildlife Reserve and Rouge-Matawin Wildlife Reserve. The village was established in the late 1880s by pioneers sent by Curé Labelle to develop this mountainous and wild region. It was once the last station of the famous "P'tit train du Nord" (Little train of the North), until it was extended to Mont-Laurier in 1909. The former Canadian Pacific Railway station in Nominingue is now a small museum and rest stop for cyclists. Golf, disc golf, biking, fishing, and hunting are among the most popular outdoor activities.

The name Nominingue comes from an Algonquin word meaning "vermilion" or "red ochre", referring to a variety of red chalk found in the area.

== History ==
In March 1883, the first settlers arrived from Montreal. By the following year, its first sawmill and flour mill was in operation. And in 1884, the parish of Saint-Ignace-de-Loyola-de-Nominingue was established, served by Jesuits until 1891. In 1887, its post office opened under the name Nominingue.

On September 15, 1904, the Village Municipality of Nominingue was formed by separating from the Township Municipality of Loranger. This township was created on June 15, 1896, out of unorganized area, and named after Louis-Onésime Loranger.

The Municipality of Loranger-Partie-Sud-Est was founded on April 29, 1920, when it split off from the Township of Loranger. It was renamed the following year to Lacaille, after its first mayor, then in 1931 to Bellerive, and renamed again in 1962 to Bellerive-sur-le-Lac.

The Municipality of Lac-Nominingue was formed on October 30, 1971, through the amalgamation of the Village Municipality of Nominingue, the Township Municipality of Loranger, and the Municipality of Bellerive-sur-le-Lac. On September 16, 2000, it was renamed to Nominingue since there no longer was a Lake Nominingue (this lake was renamed shortly before to Grand lac Nominingue).

== Geography ==
From Grand Lac Nominingue, in the northeast of the municipality, the Nominingue River flows southeast. The Petite-Nation River crosses the center of the municipality from north to south. The Preston River crosses the southeastern tip of the municipality towards the southwest. The Saguay River crosses the municipality from the north to the southeast until its mouth in Petit Lac Nominingue.

== Demographics ==
Canada census – Nominingue community profile

	2021	2016	2011
Population	2,255 (+5.5% from 2016)	2,137 (+5.8% from 2011)	2,019 (-12.9% from 2006)
Land area	303.89 km^{2} (117.33 sq mi)	307.48 km^{2} (118.72 sq mi)	306.22 km^{2} (118.23 sq mi)
Population density	7.4/km^{2} (19/sq mi)	7.0/km^{2} (18/sq mi)	6.6/km^{2} (17/sq mi)
Median age	61.6 (M: 62.4, F: 61.2)	58.3 (M: 59.2, F: 57.3)	53.6 (M: 54.6, F: 52.5)
Private dwellings	1,937 (total) 1,176 (occupied)	1,937 (total)	1,952 (total)
Median household income	$56,800	$47,232	$44,519

References: 2021 2016 2011

Historical census populations – Nominingue

Year	Pop.	±%
1976	1,326	—
1981	1,596	+20.4%
1986	1,611	+0.9%
1991	1,765	+9.6%
1996	1,930	+9.3%

Year	Pop.	±%
2001	2,064	+6.9%
2006	2,317	+12.3%
2011	2,019	−12.9%
2016	2,137	+5.8%
2021	2,255	+5.5%

Source: Statistics Canada

Mother tongue (2021):

- English as first language: 2.2%
- French as first language: 95.3%
- English and French as first language: 0.4%
- Other as first language: 1.6%

== Government ==
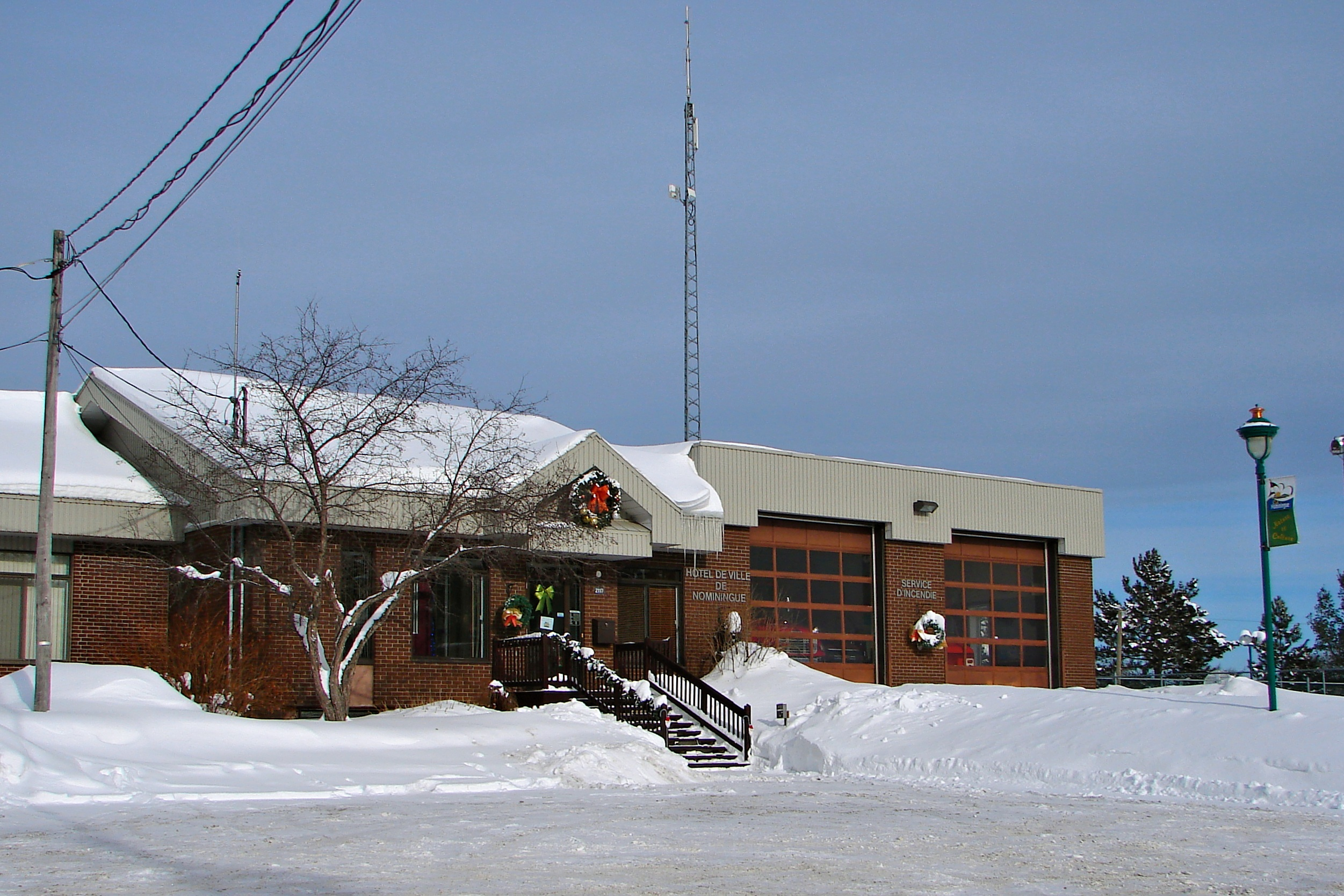
Nominingue municipal hall

List of former mayors:

- Rosaire Sénécal (...–2005)
- Serge Croisetière (2005–2009)
- Yves Généreux (2009–2013)
- Georges Décarie (2013–2021)
- Francine Létourneau (2021–present)

== Notable people ==
- Cathy Chartrand : Hockey player, former captain of Les Canadiennes de Montréal

== See also ==
- List of municipalities in Quebec
