= Saint-Sixte, Quebec =

Saint-Sixte
- Municipality
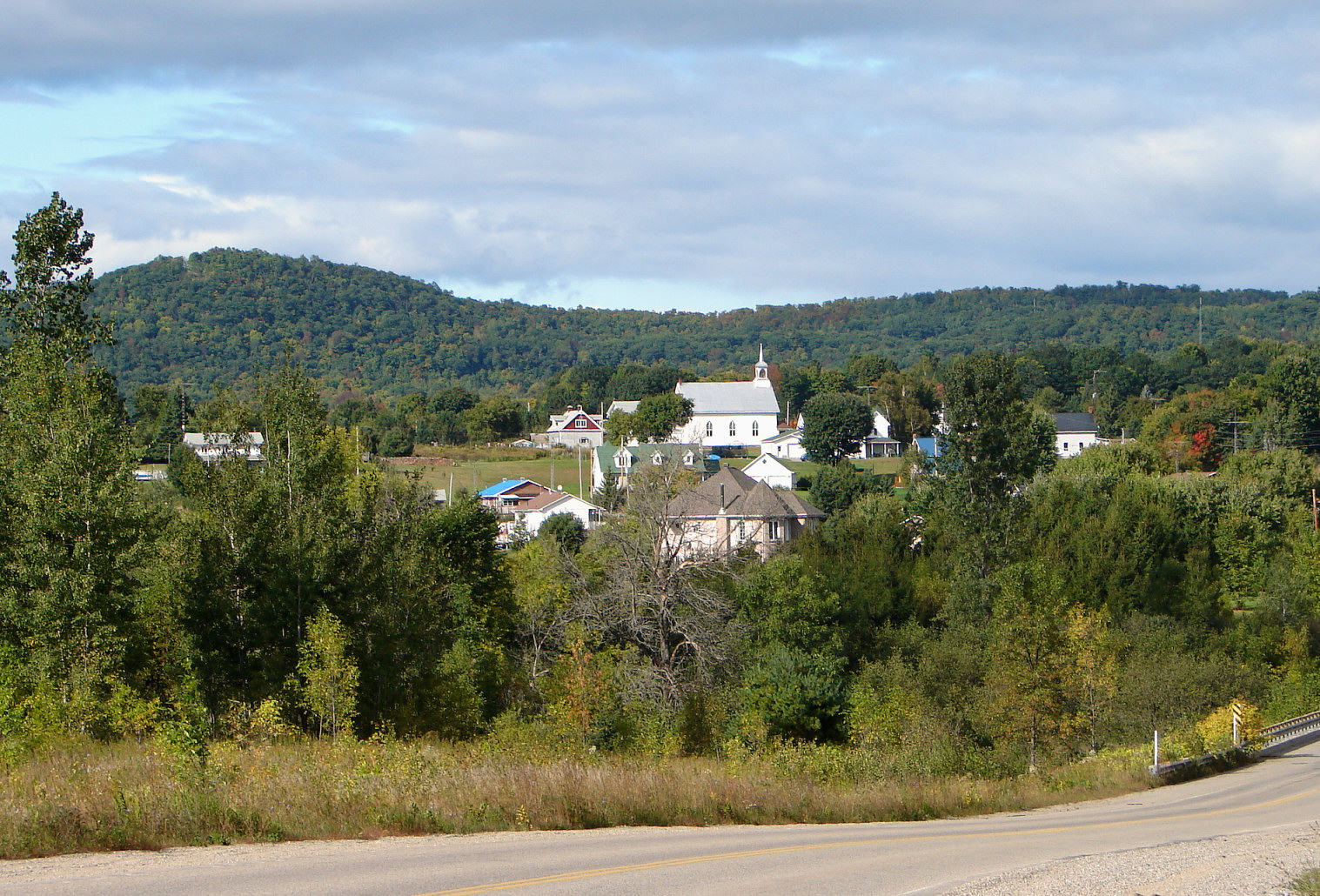

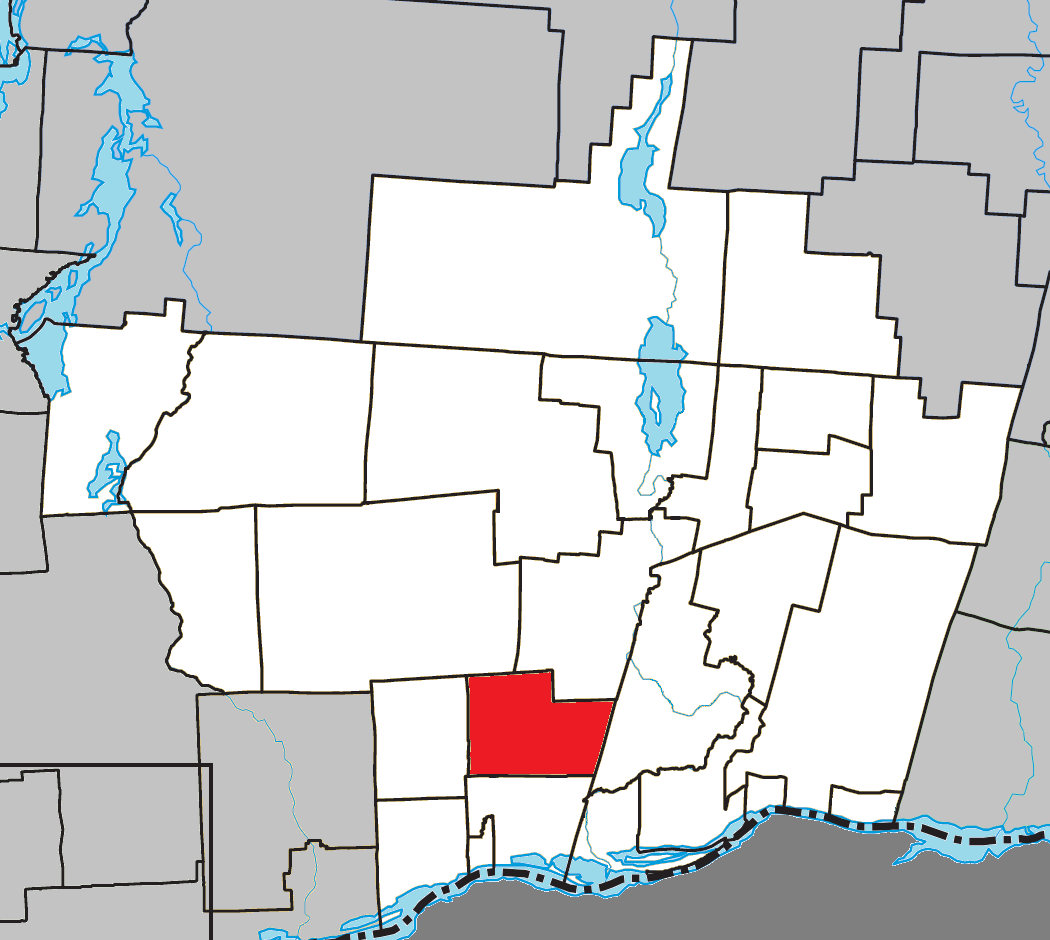
- Location within Papineau RCM

- Location in western Quebec
- Coordinates: 45°42′N 75°13′W
- Country: Canada
- Province: Quebec
- Region: Outaouais
- RCM: Papineau
- Constituted: February 7, 1893

Government
  - Mayor: André Bélisle
  - Federal riding: Argenteuil—La Petite-Nation
  - Prov. riding: Papineau

Area
  - Total: 87.60 km^{2} (33.82 sq mi)
  - Land: 85.33 km^{2} (32.95 sq mi)

Population (2021)
  - Total: 490
  - Density: 5.8/km^{2} (15/sq mi)
  - Pop 2016-2021: ▲4.5%
  - Dwellings: 219
- Time zone: UTC−5 (EST)
  - Summer (DST): UTC−4 (EDT)
- Postal code(s): J0X 3B0
- Area code: 819
- Highways: R-317
- Website: www.saintsixte.ca

Saint-Sixte (French pronunciation: [sɛ̃ sikst]) is a small town in the region of Outaouais, Quebec, Canada. It has a population of under 500. It is internationally known for its old-fashioned sugar shacks.

== Demographics ==
Canada census – Saint-Sixte community profile

	2021	2016	2011
Population	490 (+4.5% from 2016)	469 (2.0% from 2011)	460 (-1.3% from 2006)
Land area	84.34 km^{2} (32.56 sq mi)	85.33 km^{2} (32.95 sq mi)	81.28 km^{2} (31.38 sq mi)
Population density	5.8/km^{2} (15/sq mi)	5.5/km^{2} (14/sq mi)	5.7/km^{2} (15/sq mi)
Median age	49.2 (M: 50.8, F: 46.8)	47.5 (M: 47.7, F: 47.2)	43.2 (M: 44.3, F: 42.3)
Private dwellings	200 (total)	227 (total)	204 (total)
Median household income		$60,544	$47,983

References: 2021 2016 2011

Historical census populations – Saint-Sixte, Quebec
Year	Pop.	±%
1986	388	—
1991	456	+17.5%
1996	456	+0.0%
2001	439	−3.7%
2006	466	+6.2%
2011	460	−1.3%
2016	469	+2.0%
Source: Statistics Canada
