= Ripon, Quebec =

Ripon
- Municipality
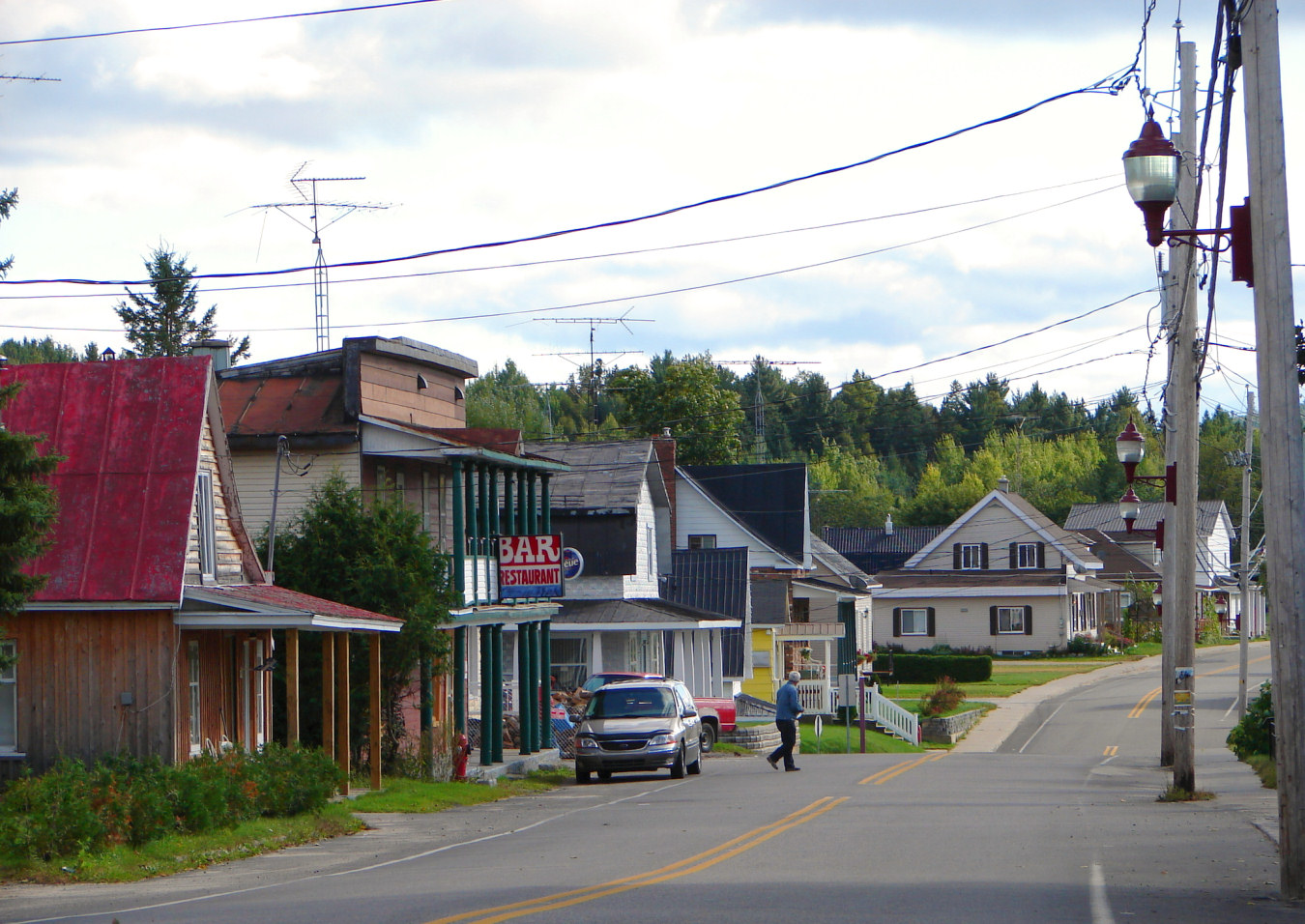
- Rue Principale (Main Street)

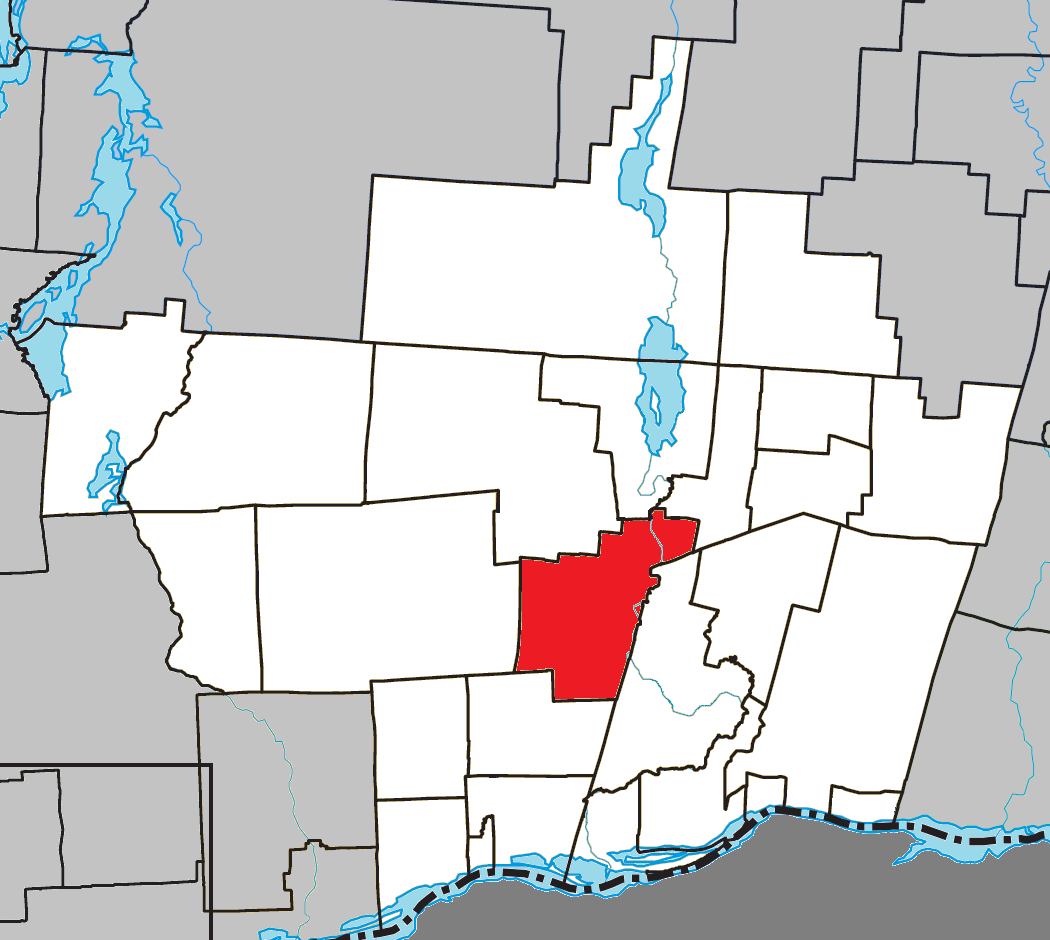
- Location within Papineau RCM

- Location in western Quebec
- Coordinates: 45°47′N 75°06′W
- Country: Canada
- Province: Quebec
- Region: Outaouais
- RCM: Papineau
- Constituted: May 3, 2000
- Named for: Ripon

Government
  - Mayor: Luc Desjardins
  - Federal riding: Argenteuil—La Petite-Nation
  - Prov. riding: Papineau

Area
  - Total: 136.10 km^{2} (52.55 sq mi)
  - Land: 129.93 km^{2} (50.17 sq mi)

Population (2021)
  - Total: 1,735
  - Density: 13.4/km^{2} (35/sq mi)
  - Pop 2016-2021: ▲12.5%
  - Dwellings: 1,009
- Time zone: UTC−5 (EST)
  - Summer (DST): UTC−4 (EDT)
- Postal code(s): J0V 1V0
- Area code: 819
- Highways: R-315; R-317; R-321
- Website: www.ripon.ca

Ripon is a municipality in Papineau Regional County Municipality in the Outaouais region of western Quebec, Canada. It is located in the valley of the Petite-Nation River.

== Demographics ==
Canada census – Ripon community profile

	2021	2016	2011
Population	1,735 (+12.5% from 2016)	1,542 (1.3% from 2011)	1,522 (1.7% from 2006)
Land area	129.93 km^{2} (50.17 sq mi)	131.47 km^{2} (50.76 sq mi)	133.11 km^{2} (51.39 sq mi)
Population density	13.4/km^{2} (35/sq mi)	11.7/km^{2} (30/sq mi)	11.4/km^{2} (30/sq mi)
Median age	53.6 (M: 52.8, F: 53.6)	53.6 (M: 53.7, F: 53.5)	49.9 (M: 49.7, F: 50.0)
Private dwellings	790 (total)	1,017 (total)	917 (total)
Median household income	$71,000	$58,400	$56,889

References: 2021 2016 2011

Historical census populations – Ripon, Quebec
Year	Pop.	±%
1986	1,249	—
1991	1,219	−2.4%
1996	1,315	+7.9%
2001	1,265	−3.8%
2006	1,497	+18.3%
2011	1,522	+1.7%
2016	1,542	+1.3%
2021	1,735	+12.5%
Population amounts prior to 2000 are total of Ripon CT and Ripon VL. Source: Statistics Canada
