= Quebec Route 317 =

Highway in Quebec, Canada

Route 317

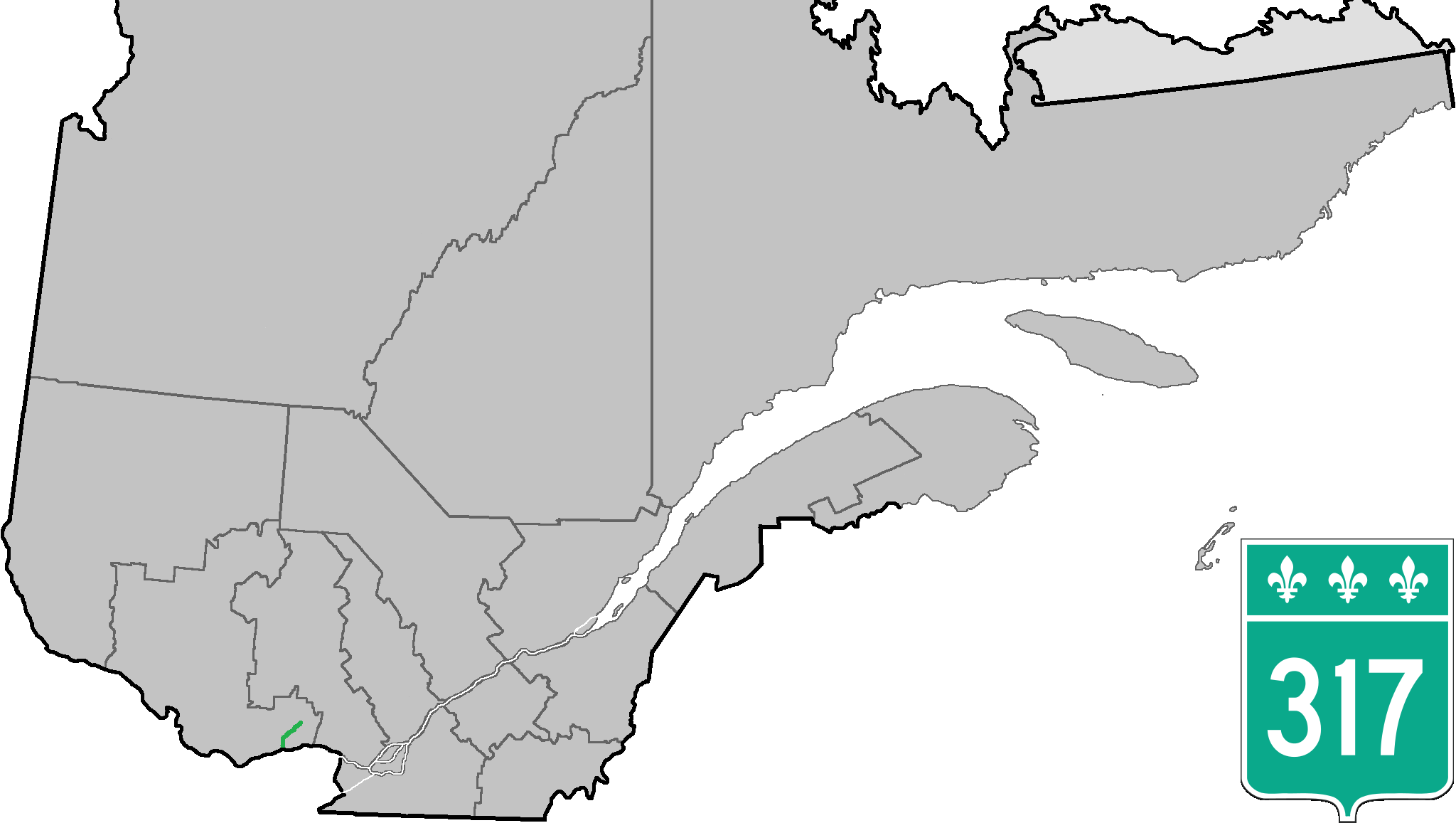

Route information
- Maintained by Transports Québec
- Length: 34.9 km (21.7 mi)

Major junctions
- South end: R-148 in Thurso
- A-50 in Lochaber (future)
- North end: R-321 in Ripon

Location
- Country: Canada
- Province: Quebec
- Major cities: Thurso, Saint-Sixte

Highway system
- Quebec provincial highways; Autoroutes; List; Former
← R-315	→ R-321

Route 317 is a provincial highway in the Papineau County of the Outaouais region east of Gatineau, Quebec. The 36-kilometer highway connects Thurso, at the junction of Route 148, to Ripon at the junction of Route 321. It is also a link to Montpellier in which a rural route connects both the 315 and 317 towards the village.

== Municipalities along Route 317 ==
- Thurso
- Lochaber
- Saint-Sixte
- Ripon

== Major intersections ==
The entire route is in Papineau RCM.

Location	km	mi	Destinations	Notes
Thurso	0	0.0	R-148 – Lochaber-Partie-Ouest, Lochaber	Southern terminus
Ripon	34.9	21.7	R-321 – Saint-André-Avellin, Chénéville	Northern terminus
1.000 mi = 1.609 km; 1.000 km = 0.621 mi

== See also ==
- List of Quebec provincial highways
