= Stéphane Lauzon =

Canadian politician

Stéphane Lauzon MP

Parliamentary Secretary to the Minister of Citizens' Services
- Incumbent
- Assumed office September 18, 2023
- Minister: Terry Beech
- Preceded by: Portfolio established
Parliamentary offices 2015‍–‍2023
Parliamentary Secretary to the Minister of Rural Economic Development
In office December 3, 2021 – September 17, 2023
Minister	Gudie Hutchings
Preceded by	Gudie Hutchings
Succeeded by	Darrell Samson
Parliamentary Secretary to the Minister of Seniors
In office December 12, 2019 – August 15, 2021
Minister	Carla Qualtrough; Kent Hehr
Preceded by	Sherry Romanado
Succeeded by	Darren Fisher
Parliamentary Secretary to the Minister of Veterans Affairs and Associate Minister of National Defence
In office August 31, 2018 – September 11, 2019
Minister	Seamus O'Regan; Jody Wilson-Raybould; Harjit Sajjan (acting); Lawrence MacAulay
Preceded by	Sherry Romanado
Succeeded by	Darrell Samson
Parliamentary Secretary to the Minister of Sport and Persons with Disabilities
In office December 2, 2015 – August 30, 2018
Minister	Carla Qualtrough; Kent Hehr
Preceded by	Portfolio established
Succeeded by	Kate Young

Member of Parliament for Argenteuil—La Petite-Nation
- Incumbent
- Assumed office October 19, 2015
- Preceded by: Mylène Freeman

Gatineau City Councillor
- In office November 5, 2009 – October 19, 2015
- Preceded by: Aurèle Desjardins
- Succeeded by: Jean-François Leblanc
- Constituency: Lac-Beauchamp District

Personal details
- Born: April 27, 1966 (age 60)
- Party: Liberal

Stéphane Lauzon MP (born April 27, 1966) is a Canadian Liberal politician. Lauzon was elected to represent the riding of Argenteuil—La Petite-Nation in the House of Commons of Canada in the 2015 federal election.

Lauzon worked at the Canadian International Paper Company in the 1980s, and returned to school in 1992 to become a certified vocational instructor. He worked in vocational training for twenty years thereafter, and then started a construction management company. He has since also taken classes toward a bachelor's degree in business administration at the Université du Québec en Outaouais.

In 2009, he was elected to the city council of Gatineau. From 2012 until his resignation in 2015 he chaired the municipal committee on sports and recreational matters.

At the time of the 2025 Canadian federal election, he lived in Plaisance, Quebec.

== Electoral record ==
2025 Canadian federal election: Argenteuil—La Petite-Nation
Party	Candidate	Votes	%	±%
Liberal	Stéphane Lauzon	28,124	47.48	+8.32
Conservative	Martin Charron	14,697	24.81	+11.33
Bloc Québécois	Martin Héroux	13,520	22.83	−9.98
New Democratic	Michel Welt	1,499	2.53	−4.60
Green	Bertha Fuchsman-Small	807	1.36	+0.98
People's	Lindsey Therrien	586	0.99	−4.78
Total valid votes		59,233	98.62	
Total rejected ballots		828	1.38	-0.33
Turnout		60,061	64.61	+4.30
Eligible voters		92,957		
Liberal notional hold		Swing		−1.51
Source: Elections Canada

2021 Canadian federal election: Argenteuil—La Petite-Nation
Party	Candidate	Votes	%	±%	Expenditures
Liberal	Stéphane Lauzon	19,371	38.3	+0.5	$85,937.45
Bloc Québécois	Yves Destroismaisons	17,842	35.3	-1.0	$26,497.70
Conservative	Marie Louis-Seize	6,547	12.9	+0.8	$9,894.45
New Democratic	Michel Welt	3,390	6.7	-0.8	$1,377.40
People's	Marc Vachon	2,777	5.5	+4.1	$2,133.60
Free	Paul Lynes	686	1.4	N/A	$413.64
Total valid votes/expense limit		50,613	98.2	–	$113,826.75
Total rejected ballots		933	1.8		
Turnout		51,546	61.2		
Registered voters		84,238			
Liberal hold		Swing		+0.8	
Source: Elections Canada

2019 Canadian federal election: Argenteuil—La Petite-Nation
Party	Candidate	Votes	%	±%	Expenditures
Liberal	Stéphane Lauzon	18,896	37.79	-5.47	$72,447.85
Bloc Québécois	Yves Destroismaisons	18,167	36.34	+17.68	$4,675.45
Conservative	Marie Louis-Seize	6,044	12.09	+0.97	$16,231.98
New Democratic	Charlotte Boucher Smoley	3,758	7.52	-17.26	$4,667.18
Green	Marjorie Valiquette	2,411	4.82	+2.63	$1,120.53
People's	Sherwin Edwards	721	1.44		none listed
Total valid votes/expense limit		49,997	98.37		
Total rejected ballots		828	1.63	+0.47	
Turnout		50,825	63.37	-2.17	
Eligible voters		80,202			
Liberal hold		Swing		-11.58	
Source: Elections Canada

2015 Canadian federal election: Argenteuil—La Petite-Nation
Party	Candidate	Votes	%	±%	Expenditures
Liberal	Stéphane Lauzon	22,093	43.26	+29.52	$52,794.82
New Democratic	Chantal Crête	12,650	24.77	-20.24	$46,712.51
Bloc Québécois	Jonathan Beauchamp	9,525	18.65	-4.62	-
Conservative	Maxime Hupé-Labelle	5,680	11.12	-3.59	$24,593.67
Green	Audrey Lamarche	1,118	2.19	-0.44	$839.35
Total valid votes/Expense limit		51,066	100.0		$213,069.11
Total rejected ballots		601	–	–	
Turnout		51,667	65.71	–	
Eligible voters		78,626			
Source: Elections Canada

2013 Gatineau municipal election: Lac-Beauchamp District
Party	Candidate	Vote	%
Independent	Stéphane Lauzon	2,632	74.04
Action Gatineau	Chakib Ahmimed	923	25.96

2009 Gatineau municipal election: Lac-Beauchamp District
Candidate	Vote	%
Stéphane Lauzon	1,580	42.18
Jacques Robert	1,548	41.32
Michel Choquette	618	16.50
