= Saint-André-Avellin =

- Municipality
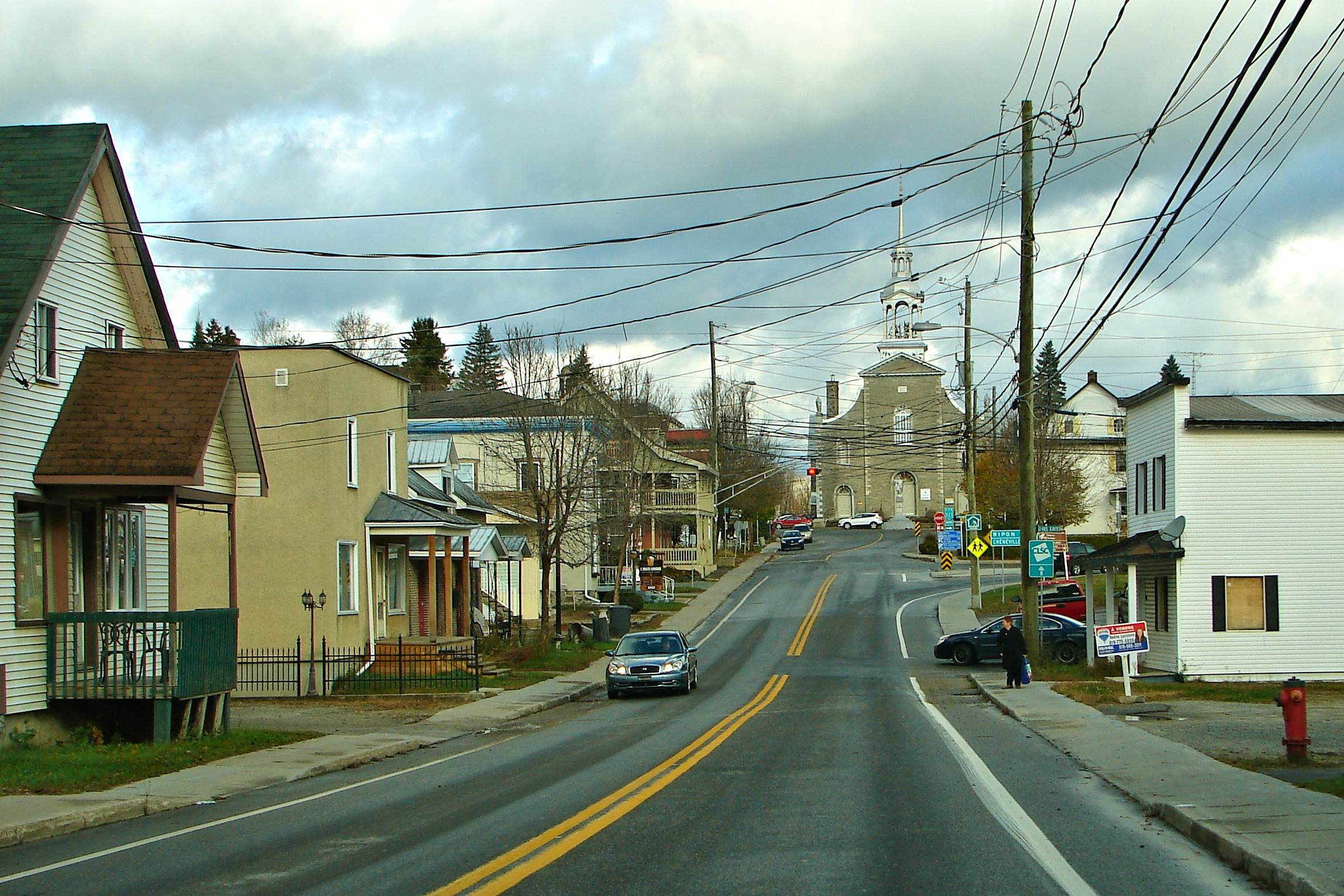

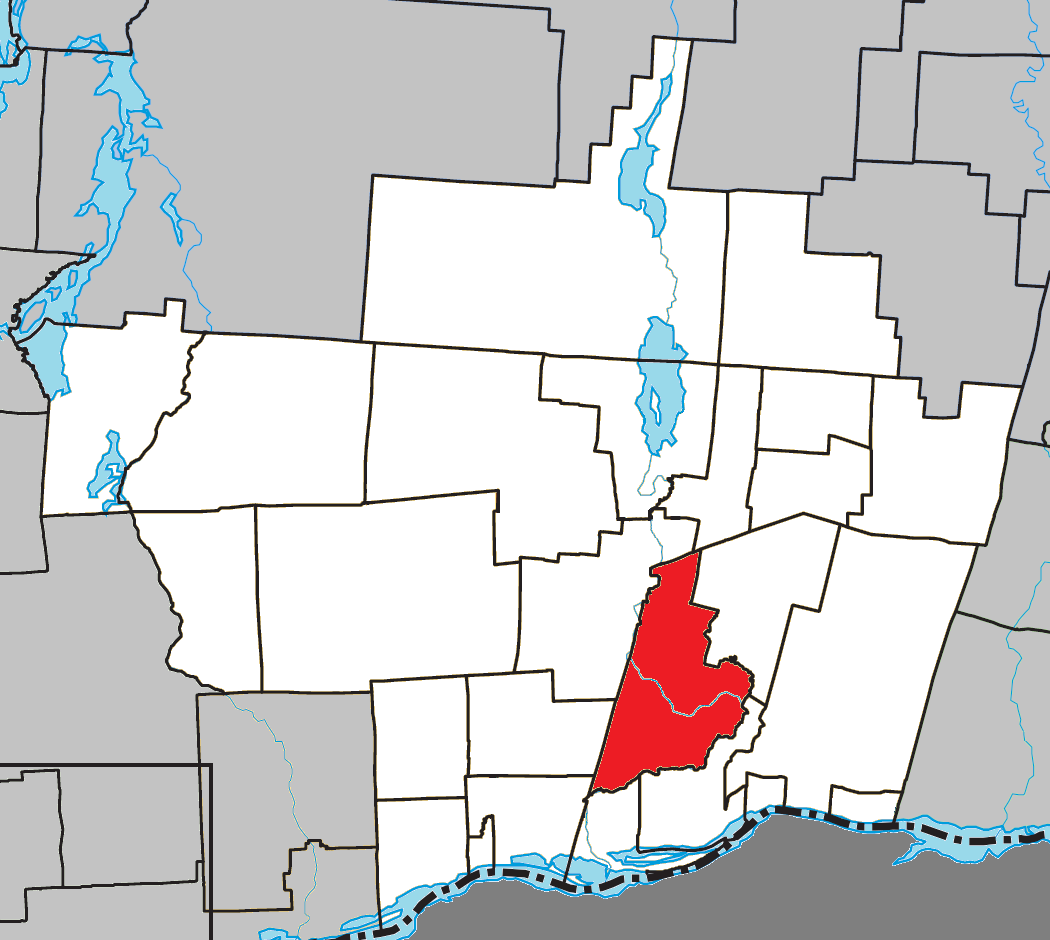
- Location within Papineau RCM

- Location in western Quebec
- Coordinates: 45°43′N 75°04′W
- Country: Canada
- Province: Quebec
- Region: Outaouais
- RCM: Papineau
- Constituted: December 17, 1997

Government
  - Mayor: Jean-René Carrière
  - Federal riding: Argenteuil—La Petite-Nation
  - Prov. riding: Papineau

Area
  - Total: 139.00 km^{2} (53.67 sq mi)
  - Land: 137.99 km^{2} (53.28 sq mi)

Population (2016)
  - Total: 3,749
  - Density: 27.2/km^{2} (70/sq mi)
  - Pop 2011-2016: ▲1.3%
  - Dwellings: 1,893
- Time zone: UTC−5 (EST)
  - Summer (DST): UTC−4 (EDT)
- Postal code(s): J0V 1W0
- Area code: 819
- Highways: R-321; R-323
- Website: www.ville.st-andre-avellin.qc.ca

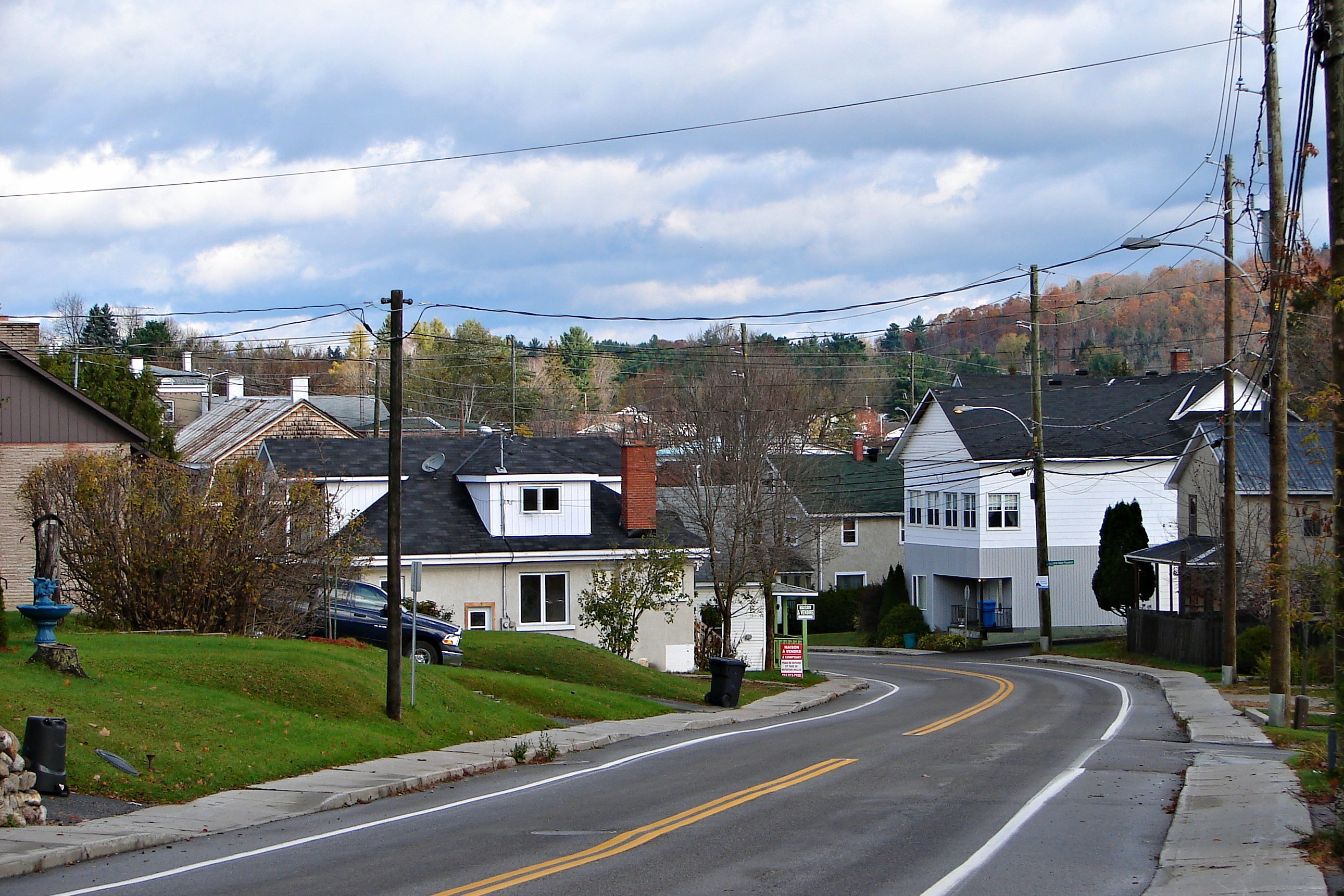
Route 321 through Saint-André-Avellin

Saint-André-Avellin (French pronunciation: [sɛ̃t‿ɑ̃dʁe avlɛ̃]) is a municipality located within the Papineau Regional County Municipality in the Outaouais region in western Quebec, Canada. At the 2016 census, it had a population of 3,749 people.

The town, located along Quebec route 321, is about 10 kilometres (6.2 mi) north of Papineauville and Quebec route 148 and Quebec Autoroute 50 and is about an hour away from Downtown Ottawa.

== History ==
It was in 1841 that the first settlers arrived in the townships which Saint-André-Avellin today lies. As being part of a large valley near the Ottawa River, it had agriculture potential but was located very far from the main corridor of the Saint Lawrence River and the main area in which there was significant agriculture development in large townships on both sides of the river between Montreal and Quebec City. Due to the more remote location and the lack of efficient transportation, the development during much of the remainder of the 19th century was fairly slow until several economic crises forced authorities to look for newer land to develop. Throughout most of the century, it was mostly used for the logging industry due to the proximity of extensive forest areas in the higher valleys and hills of the region.

The parish municipality was created in 1851 and it was in 1890, that the first school was built in the area. Population gradually increased, especially during the 1970s by a wave of rural development. The parish and the village that was made official in the second half of the 19th century merged in the late 1990s.

== Demographics ==
Canada census – Saint-André-Avellin community profile

	2021	2016	2011
Population	3,562 (-5.0% from 2016)	3,749 (1.3% from 2011)	3,702 (7.8% from 2006)
Land area	137.34 km^{2} (53.03 sq mi)	137.99 km^{2} (53.28 sq mi)	138.68 km^{2} (53.54 sq mi)
Population density	25.9/km^{2} (67/sq mi)	27.2/km^{2} (70/sq mi)	26.7/km^{2} (69/sq mi)
Median age	54 (M: 54, F: 54.4)	51.2 (M: 50.8, F: 51.7)	49.1 (M: 48.6, F: 49.6)
Private dwellings	1,615 (total)	1,893 (total)	1,769 (total)
Median household income		$48,213	$41,812

References: 2021 2016 2011

Historical census populations – Saint-André-Avellin, Quebec
Year	Pop.	±%
1986	2,688	—
1991	2,951	+9.8%
1996	3,298	+11.8%
2001	3,434	+4.1%
2006	3,435	+0.0%
2011	3,702	+7.8%
2016	3,749	+1.3%
Population amounts prior to 1997 are total of Saint-André-Avellin VL and Saint-André-Avellin P. Source: Statistics Canada

== Features and festivals ==
It is one of the major sites of what it is called La Petite-Nation and is the site of two major summer events including the annual Western Rodeo Festival, as well as Musique en Nous, a county-wide event which it presents newer musical talents in the region as well as popular Quebec singers. The town is also home to a theatre and a regional museum related to the history of the Petite-Nation.

== Local government ==
List of former mayors:

- Jean-Denis Lalonde (2002–2005)
- Thérèse Whissell (2005-2017)
- Jean-René Carrière (2017–present)

== See also ==
- List of municipalities in Quebec
- Petite-Nation River
