= Grand Lac Nominingue =

Lake in Quebec, Canada

- Interactive map of Grand Lac Nominingue
- Location: Nominingue, Antoine-Labelle Regional County Municipality, Quebec
- Coordinates: 46°25′48″N 74°58′47″W
- Basin countries: Canada
- Max. length: 8 km (5.0 mi)
- Max. width: 3 km (1.9 mi)
- Surface area: 22 km^{2} (8.5 sq mi)
- Average depth: 12 m (39 ft)
- Max. depth: 40 m (130 ft)

Grand Lac Nominingue (French pronunciation: [ɡʁɑ̃ lak nɔminɛ̃ɡ]) is a lake in Southwest Quebec. It is located in the Laurentian Mountains, bordering the village of Nominingue, and connected to Petit Lac Nominingue through a river.
