= Thurso, Quebec =

Thurso
- City
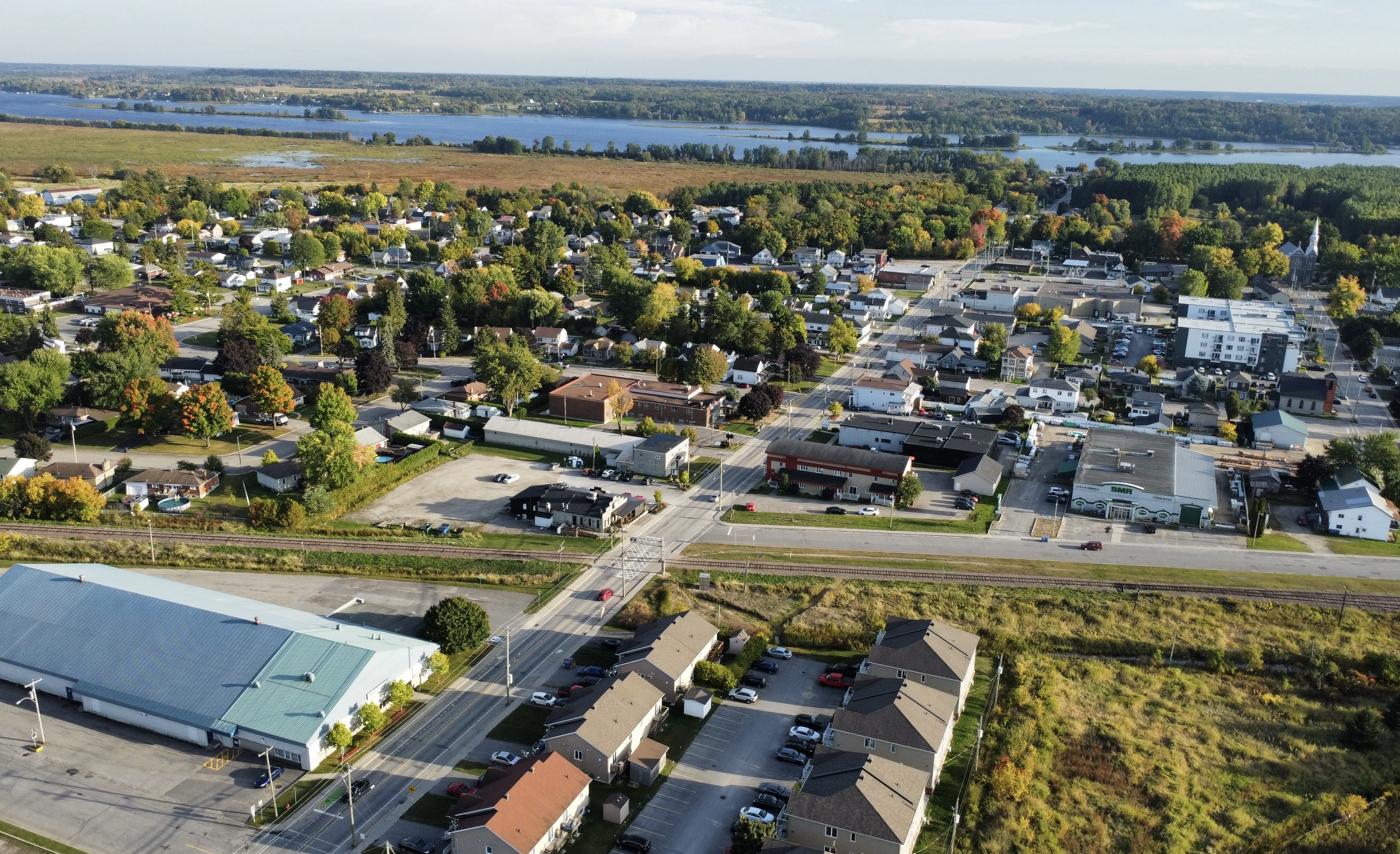
- Aerial View of Thurso

- Coat of arms

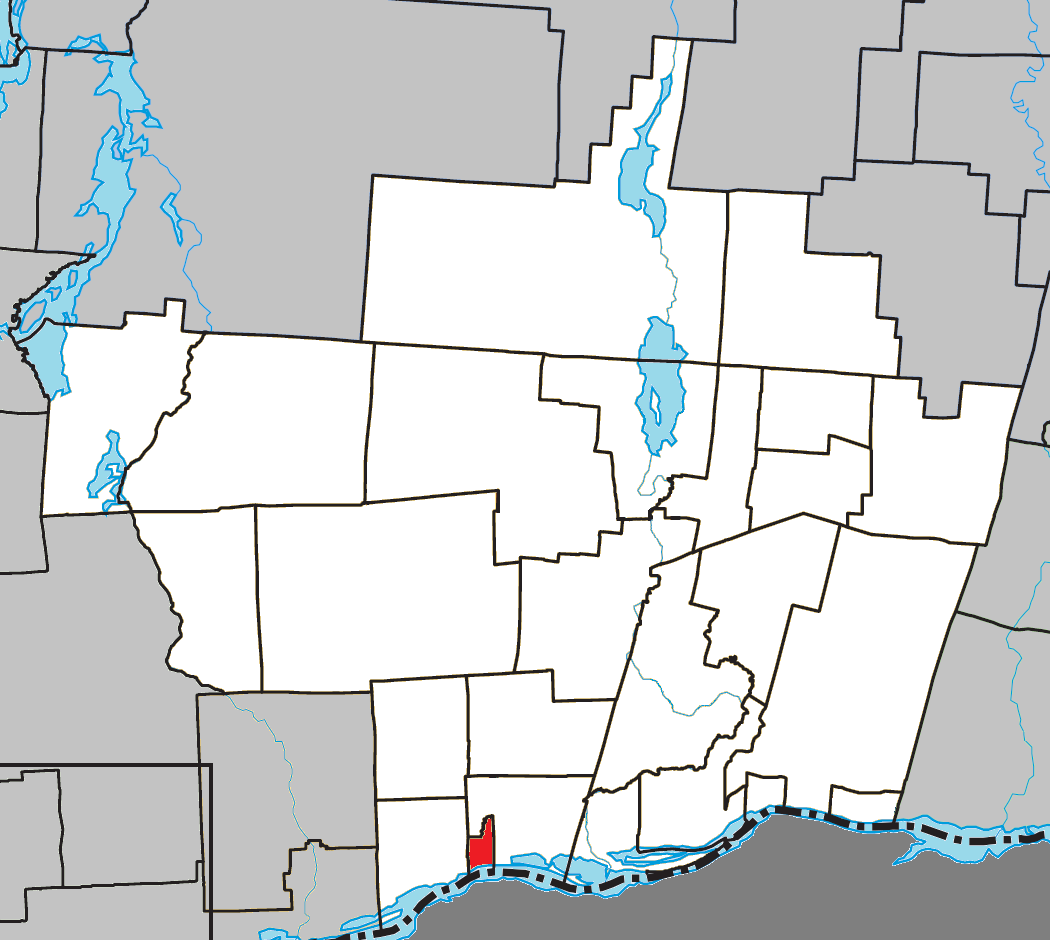
- Location within Papineau RCM

- Location in western Quebec
- Coordinates: 45°35′49″N 75°14′36″W
- Country: Canada
- Province: Quebec
- Region: Outaouais
- RCM: Papineau
- Constituted: January 16, 1886

Government
  - Mayor: Mélanie Boyer
  - Federal riding: Argenteuil—La Petite-Nation
  - Prov. riding: Papineau

Area
  - Total: 7.40 km^{2} (2.86 sq mi)
  - Land: 6.65 km^{2} (2.57 sq mi)

Population (2021)
  - Total: 3,084
  - Density: 463.8/km^{2} (1,201/sq mi)
  - Pop 2016-2021: ▲9.4%
  - Dwellings: 1,510
- Time zone: UTC−5 (EST)
  - Summer (DST): UTC−4 (EDT)
- Postal code(s): J0X 3B0
- Area code: 819
- Highways: R-148; R-317
- Website: ville.thurso.qc.ca

Thurso (French: [tyʁso], Canadian French: [t͡sʏʁso]) is a city in Papineau Regional County Municipality in the Outaouais region of western Quebec, Canada. It is located opposite Clarence, Ontario on the Ottawa River, and is within Canada's National Capital Region. Its population was 3,084 as of the 2021 Canadian Census.

== History ==
In 1807, a group of Scots settled in the southern part of the Blanche River valley, in the township known at the time as Lochaber Gore. They came from Thurso in Scotland, as well as from the Highlands, near Lochaber and other parts of northern Scotland. In 1830, Irish immigrants arrived, followed by French Canadians around 1840.

In 1822, a Baptist Church was established, and in 1853, the post office opened, causing a controversy: the Catholic community suggested naming it Fraserville, while the Scottish community favored Cameron, because most were from this clan. The postmaster settled on the name Thurso, since there already was a place called Fraserville in Canada. In 1886, the town was incorporated as a village municipality, which was followed by the establishment of the religious and civil parish the next year.

Starting in 1850, Thurso became an important centre of the wood industry. In 1929, the Singer Manufacturing Co. opened a sewing machine plant there. Around the same time construction began on a 90 kilometres (56 mi) long railroad for the transportation of lumber from the interior (which closed in 1986). In 1956, the paper mill opened.

In 1963, Thurso changed its statutes and became a ville (town/city).

=== Earthquakes ===
Earthquake Hits Ottawa, Canada at Wikinews

An earthquake with a magnitude of 4.5 was centred north in Thurso at 8:39 pm, on February 24, 2006. Another earthquake with a magnitude of 4.1 was centred in Thurso at 3:39pm on September 18, 2006.

== Demographics ==
In the 2021 Census of Population conducted by Statistics Canada, Thurso had a population of 3,084 living in 1,421 of its 1,510 total private dwellings, a change of 9.4% from its 2016 population of 2,818. With a land area of 6.65 km^{2} (2.57 sq mi), it had a population density of 463.8/km^{2} (1,201.1/sq mi) in 2021.

Canada census – Thurso, Quebec community profile

	2021	2016	2011
Population	3,084 (9.4% from 2016)	2,818 (14.8% from 2011)	2,455 (6.8% from 2006)
Land area	6.65 km^{2} (2.57 sq mi)	6.28 km^{2} (2.42 sq mi)	6.27 km^{2} (2.42 sq mi)
Population density	463.8/km^{2} (1,201/sq mi)	449.0/km^{2} (1,163/sq mi)	391.8/km^{2} (1,015/sq mi)
Median age	41.6 (M: 41.6, F: 41.6)	39.8 (M: 39.6, F: 40.0)	45.0 (M: 43.7, F: 45.7)
Private dwellings	1,510 (total)	1,308 (total)	1,075 (total)
Median household income	$62,000	$53,077	$45,825

References: 2021 2016 2011

Historical census populations – Thurso, Quebec
Year	Pop.	±%
1891	578	—
1901	525	−9.2%
1911	601	+14.5%
1921	538	−10.5%
1931	1,292	+140.1%
1941	1,295	+0.2%
1951	1,973	+52.4%
1956	2,324	+17.8%
1961	3,310	+42.4%
1966	3,332	+0.7%
1971	3,219	−3.4%
1976	3,066	−4.8%
1981	2,780	−9.3%
1986	2,578	−7.3%
1991	2,507	−2.8%
1996	2,498	−0.4%
2001	2,446	−2.1%
2006	2,299	−6.0%
2011	2,455	+6.8%
2016	2,818	+14.8%
2021	3,084	+9.4%
Source: Statistics Canada

Mother tongue:

- English as first language: 2.9%
- French as first language: 94.0%
- English and French as first language: 1.8%
- Other as first language: 0.8%

== Economy ==
Thurso is known for the unpleasant odour emanating from its paper mill, which originates from the burning of chemical residue when the pulp is manufactured and the smell was there well before the retaining basin was built. Fortress Paper employs 335 people in Thurso to produce 250,000 tonnes of hardwood kraft market pulp. However, the company had financial difficulties and led to its operations temporarily being shut down in 2006 and again for an eight-week period in 2009.

The Lauzon sawmill was another major employer for the community, but its building was destroyed by a fire on March 8, 2007, putting 100 workers temporarily out of work. However, plans for relaunching the production activity started shortly after the event.

Thurso's only bar/hotel, Hotel Lafontaine, burned twice in 2009, once in February and again a month later, with the latter fire resulting in complete destruction. In 2010, Hotel Lafontaine reopened just beside its previous location.

== Infrastructure ==
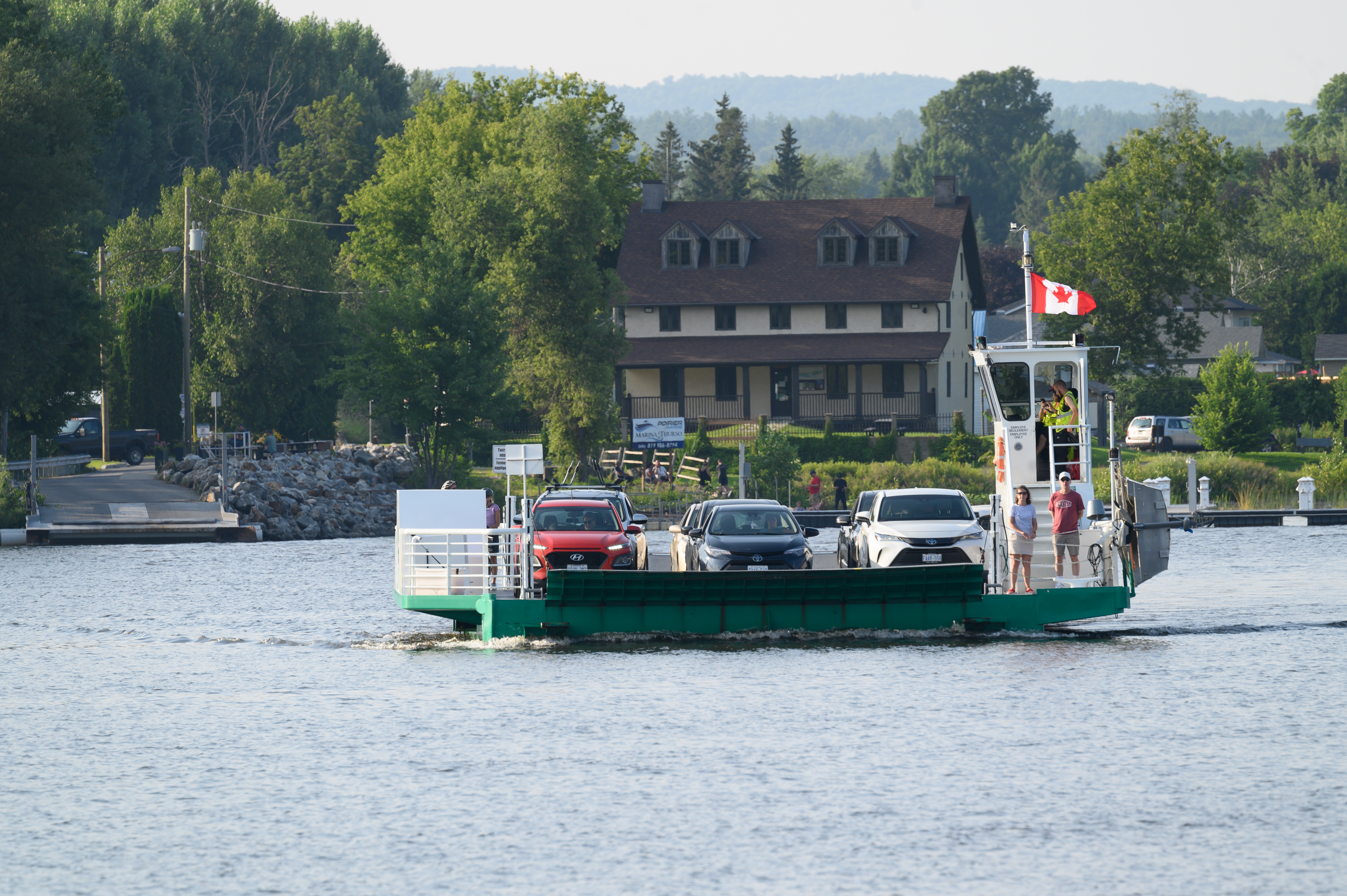
Battery-powered, electric-cable ferry, Ecolos, running on demand from Thurso, Quebec, to Clarence Island, Ontario, Canada.

Thurso's main access roads are currently Route 148 (running west–east) and Route 317 (running south–north). Autoroute 50, approximately 3 km north of Thurso along Route 317 complements Route 148 as Thurso's second connection to Gatineau and Ottawa. The Quebec Gatineau Railway provides rail freight transport.

A seasonal ferry operates between Thurso and Clarence-Rockland, Ontario.

== Notable people ==
Hockey legend Guy Lafleur was born in Thurso and has an arena and street named after him.

Bill Clement, another NHL player who went on to become a well-known hockey commentator, also came from Thurso during the same time period as Lafleur.

Gerry Monaghan, former MPP for Sudbury provincial electoral district.
