= Petit Lac Nominingue =

Lake in Quebec, Canada

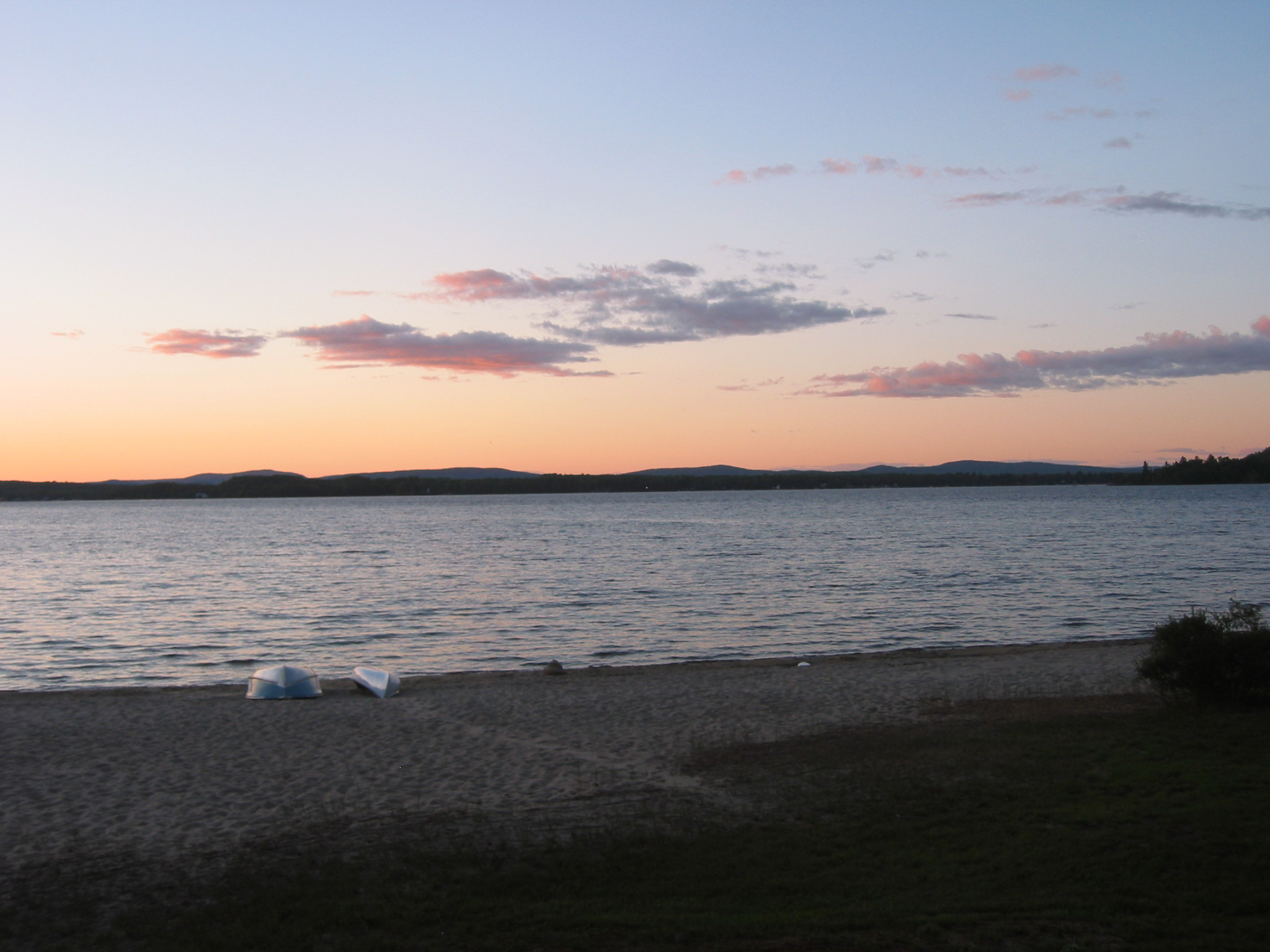

- Location within Quebec
- Location: Nominingue, Antoine-Labelle Regional County Municipality, Quebec
- Coordinates: 46°21′55″N 75°00′59″W
- Basin countries: Canada

Petit Lac Nominingue is a small lake in Southwest Quebec, located in the Laurentian Mountains about 55 km, by road, northwest of Mont Tremblant. It is connected to Grand Lac Nominingue by a small river that travels under a bridge. The village of Nominingue is located between both Lac Nominingue and Petit Lac Nominingue.

== Literature ==
- Graham, Joseph Naming the Laurentians: A History of Place Names 'up North' ISBN 978-0973958607
