= Plaisance, Quebec =

Plaisance
- Municipality
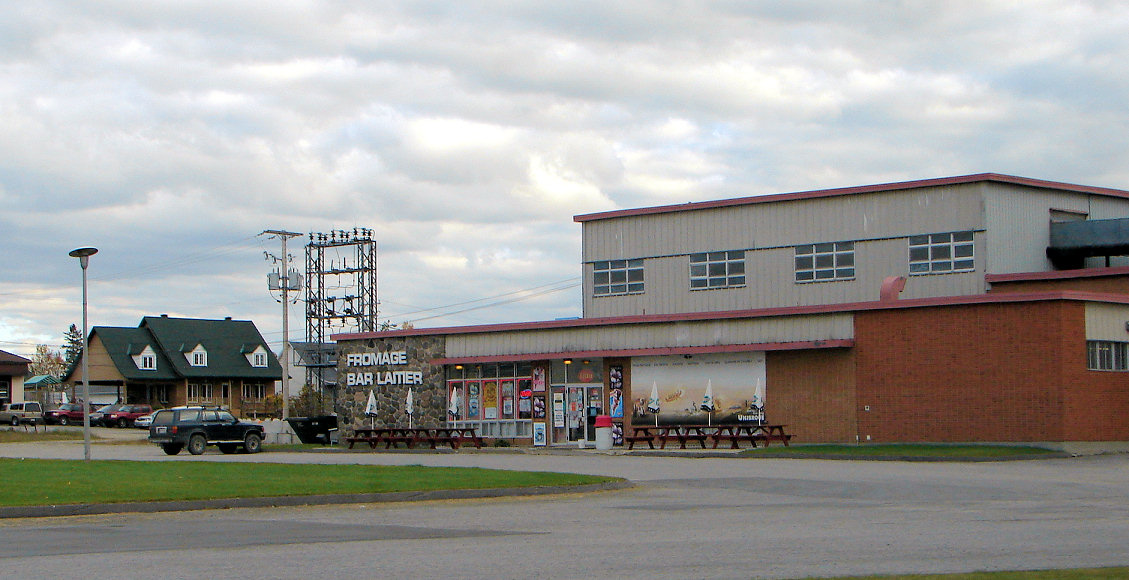
- Plaisance cheese factory

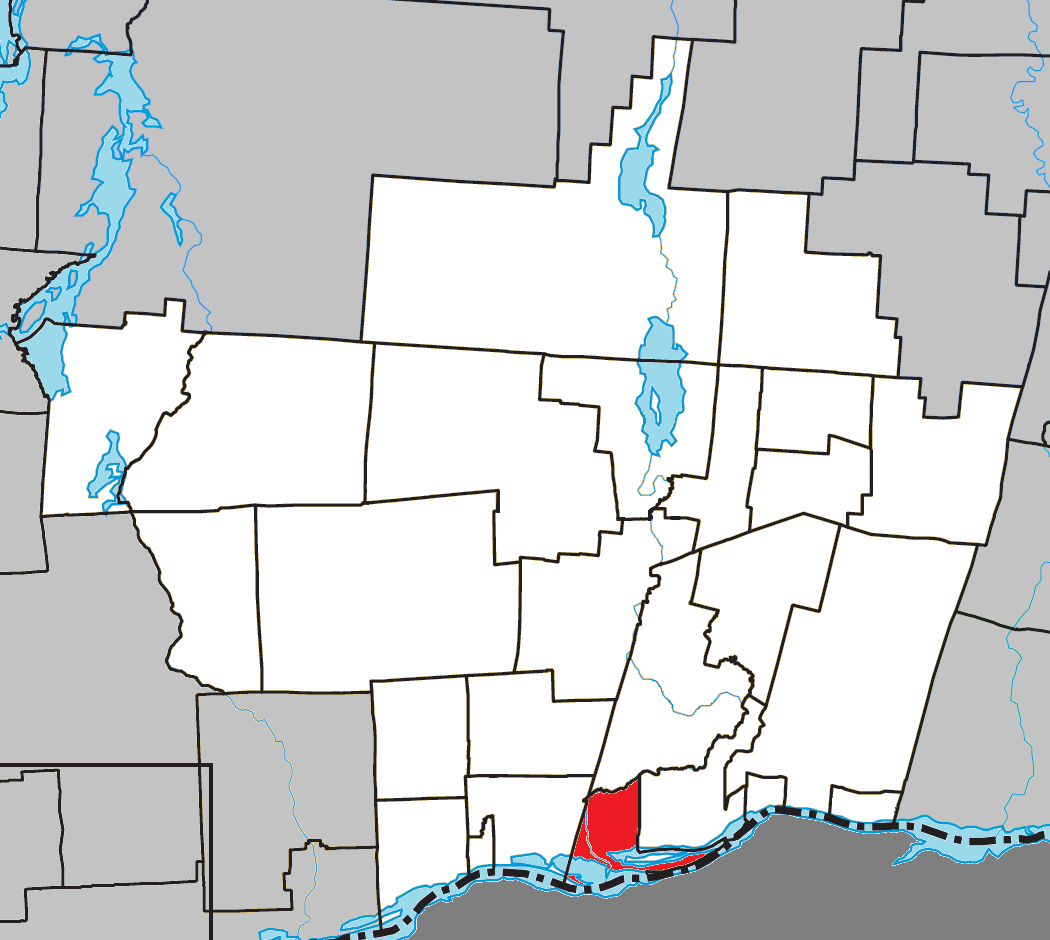
- Location within Papineau RCM

- Location in western Quebec
- Coordinates: 45°37′N 75°07′W
- Country: Canada
- Province: Quebec
- Region: Outaouais
- RCM: Papineau
- Constituted: October 31, 1900

Government
  - Mayor: Paulette Lalande
  - Federal riding: Argenteuil—La Petite-Nation
  - Prov. riding: Papineau

Area
  - Total: 50.20 km^{2} (19.38 sq mi)
  - Land: 36.15 km^{2} (13.96 sq mi)

Population (2016)
  - Total: 1,088
  - Density: 30.1/km^{2} (78/sq mi)
  - Pop 2011-2016: ▼1.4%
  - Dwellings: 537
- Time zone: UTC−5 (EST)
  - Summer (DST): UTC−4 (EDT)
- Postal code(s): J0V 1S0
- Area code: 819
- Highways: R-148
- Website: www.ville.plaisance.qc.ca

Plaisance (French pronunciation: [plɛzɑ̃s]) is a municipality in Papineau Regional County Municipality in western Quebec, Canada. The village is situated on the Ottawa River near the mouth of the Petite-Nation River, 70 km from Gatineau and 160 km from Montreal on Route 148.

The village is well known for its waterfalls located just north of town as well as a local cheese factory which was previously quite popular in the Outaouais region. There is also the Plaisance National Park, a large bird reserve between the main highway and the Ottawa River.

== Demographics ==
Canada census – Plaisance community profile

	2021	2016	2011
Population	1,129 (+3.8% from 2016)	1,088 (-1.4% from 2011)	1,103 (7.7% from 2006)
Land area	36.21 km^{2} (13.98 sq mi)	36.15 km^{2} (13.96 sq mi)	36.23 km^{2} (13.99 sq mi)
Population density	31.2/km^{2} (81/sq mi)	30.1/km^{2} (78/sq mi)	30.4/km^{2} (79/sq mi)
Median age	51.2 (M: 50.8, F: 51.6)	47.8 (M: 46.4, F: 49.7)	46.8 (M: 45.0, F: 48.3)
Private dwellings	505 (total)	537 (total)	514 (total)
Median household income		$58,048	$48,305

References: 2021 2016 2011

Historical census populations – Plaisance, Quebec
Year	Pop.	±%
1986	948	—
1991	992	+4.6%
1996	992	+0.0%
2001	1,004	+1.2%
2006	1,024	+2.0%
2011	1,103	+7.7%
2016	1,088	−1.4%
Population amounts are not adjusted for boundary changes. Source: Statistics Canada

Mother tongue:

- English as first language: 2.3%
- French as first language: 96.8%
- English and French as first language: 0.5%
- Other as first language: 0%
