= Papineau-Labelle Wildlife Reserve =

- Réserve faunique de Papineau-Labelle
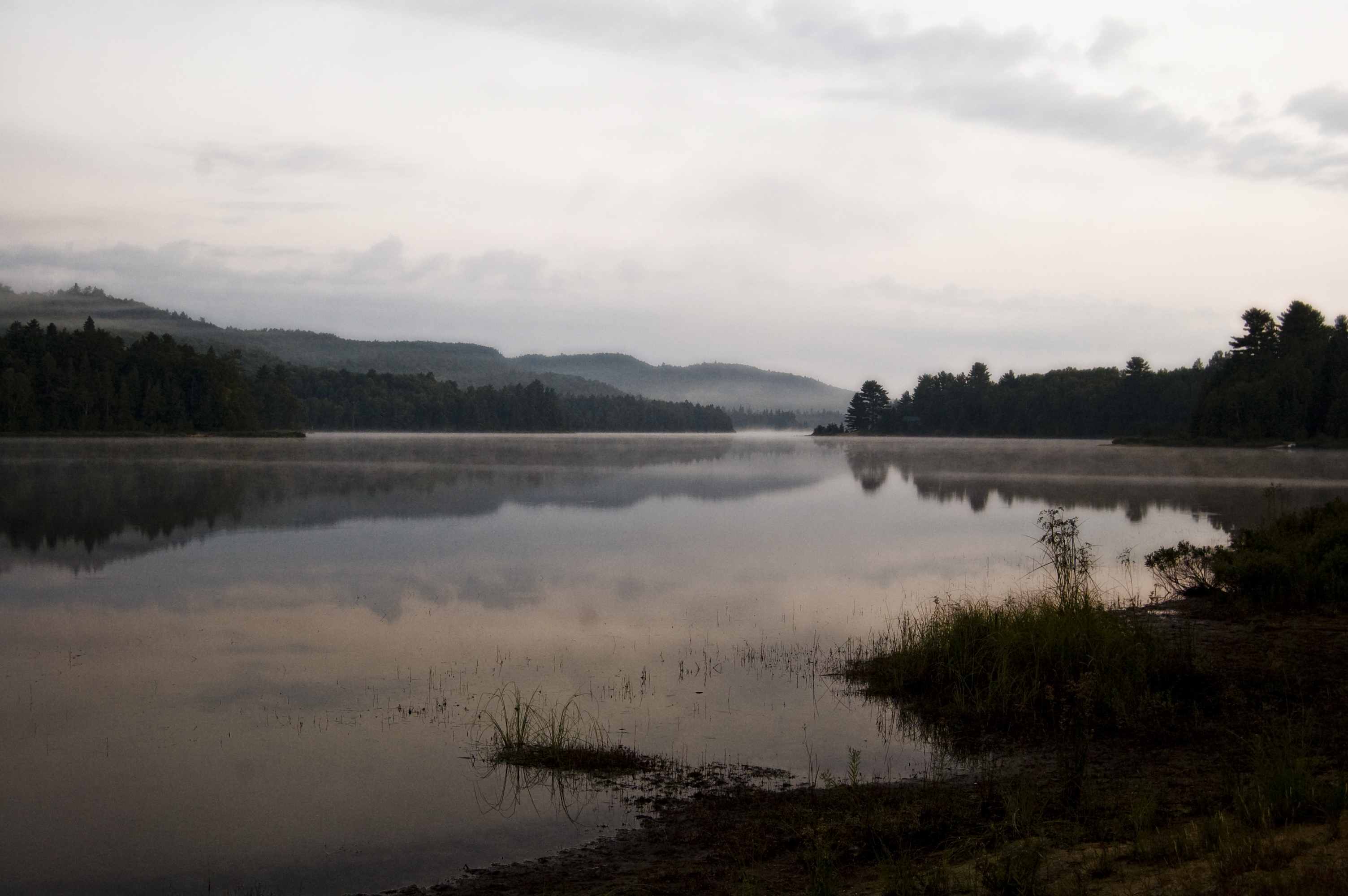
- Ernest Lake at dawn

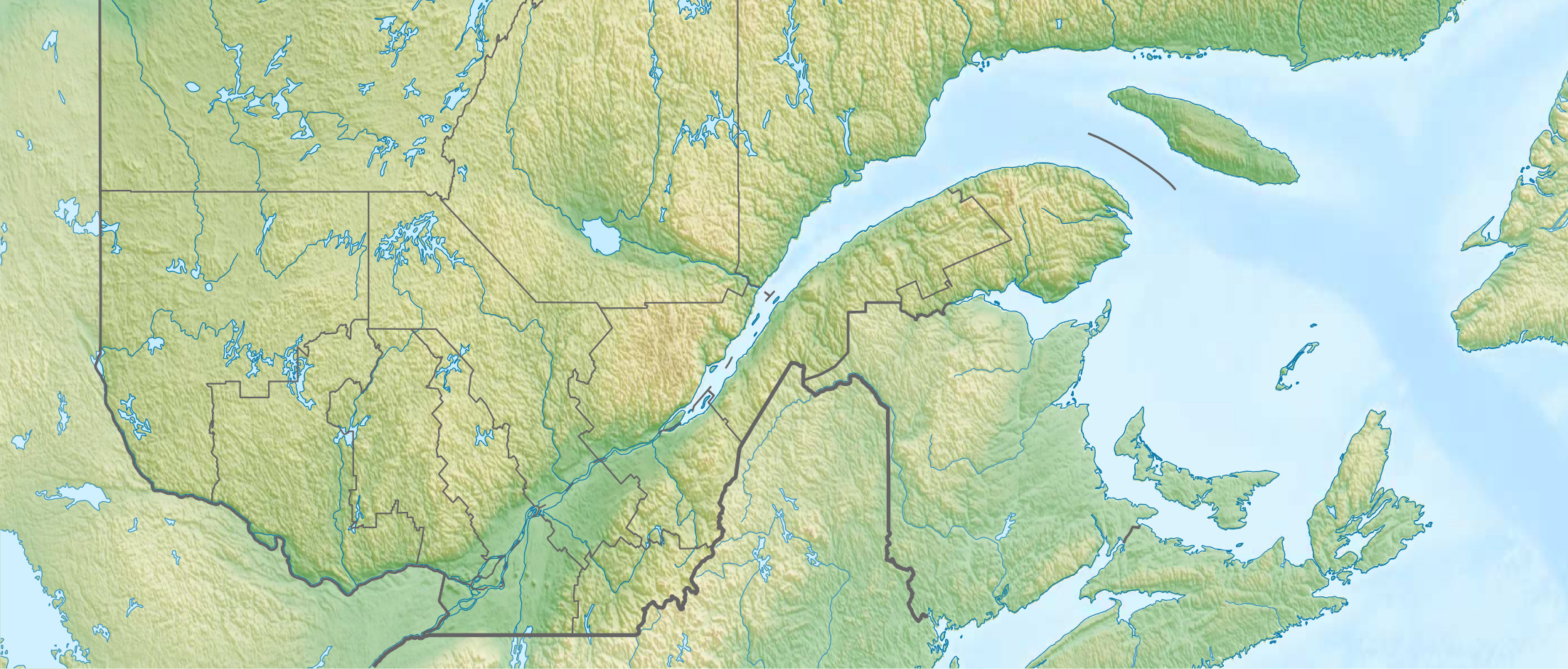
- Location within Quebec South
- Location: Papineau Regional County Municipality / Antoine-Labelle Regional County Municipality, Quebec, Canada
- Nearest city: Gatineau
- Coordinates: 46°05′N 75°17′W
- Area: 1,628 km^{2} (629 sq mi)
- Established: 1971
- Governing body: Sépaq
- Website: www.sepaq.com/rf/pal/en/

Papineau-Labelle Wildlife Reserve is a reserve in the Laurentian Mountains of Quebec, Canada, stretching across the Laurentides and Outaouais regions.

The area was extensively logged in the late 19th to the mid-20th century. Although logging still continues on a smaller scale, the reserve was created in 1971 to provide outdoor recreation opportunities while favouring wildlife conservation. In harmony with its mandate to ensure the sustainability of resources and to foster the rational use of its territory, the reserve pursues wildlife and fish development activities by setting up spawning grounds, tree groves, interpretation trails, and nesting boxes.

It is named after two historical figures of Quebec: Louis-Joseph Papineau (1786–1871), famous orator and leader of the Patriots of 1837, and Antoine Labelle (1833–1891), pastor of St. Jerome and ardent proponent of the colonization of the Upper Laurentians.

The Montreal Gazette of November 18, 2008, called the Papineau-Labelle Reserve "magnificent" and included it in the 10 hot spots of Quebec's wilderness that "you should experience before you die".

== Geography ==
This large reserve, spanning across 9 municipalities and 1 territory, contains 763 lakes and 42 streams, and has mountain peaks up to 500 metres (1,600 ft). It is the source of 2 river basins, namely the Petite-Nation River, which flows from north to south into the Ottawa River, and the Sourd River, which is a tributary of the Du Lièvre River to the west.

Among the larger, more notable lakes are:

- Echo Lake
- Ernest Lake
- Joinville Lake
- Lock Lake (Lac de l'Écluse)
- Lake of Mallows (Lac des Mauves)
- Marie-Lefranc Lake
- Montjoie Lake
- Paul Lake
- Preston Lake
- Saint-Denis Lake
- Lake of Seven Brothers (Lac des Sept Frères)
- Sourd Lake

== Flora and fauna ==
The reserve lies within the eastern forest-boreal transition ecoregion. The landscape is characterized by mixed forest, dominated by sugar maple and yellow birch. Besides several softwood species (such as fir, spruce, pine, cedar and hemlock), other hardwood species present include: red oak, beech, linden, elm, and ash.

Many species of mammals and birds are found within the reserve, including: white-tailed deer, moose, black bear, wolf, beaver, fox, snowshoe hare, ruffed grouse and spruce grouse.

Fish species found within its lakes include: brook trout, lake trout (salmon trout), splake, smallmouth bass, walleye, and northern pike.

== Activities ==
The reserve has activities for year-round use, including fishing, hunting, canoe camping, hiking, wild berry picking, wildlife and bird viewing, cross-country skiing, dogsledding, and snowmobiling. Permits and payment of fees are required for any of these activities.

Visitors can be accommodated in cabins, rustic shelters, huts, and campsites (semi-serviced and backcountry).
