= Petite-Nation River =

River in Quebec

Coordinates: 45°35′09″N 75°06′31″W

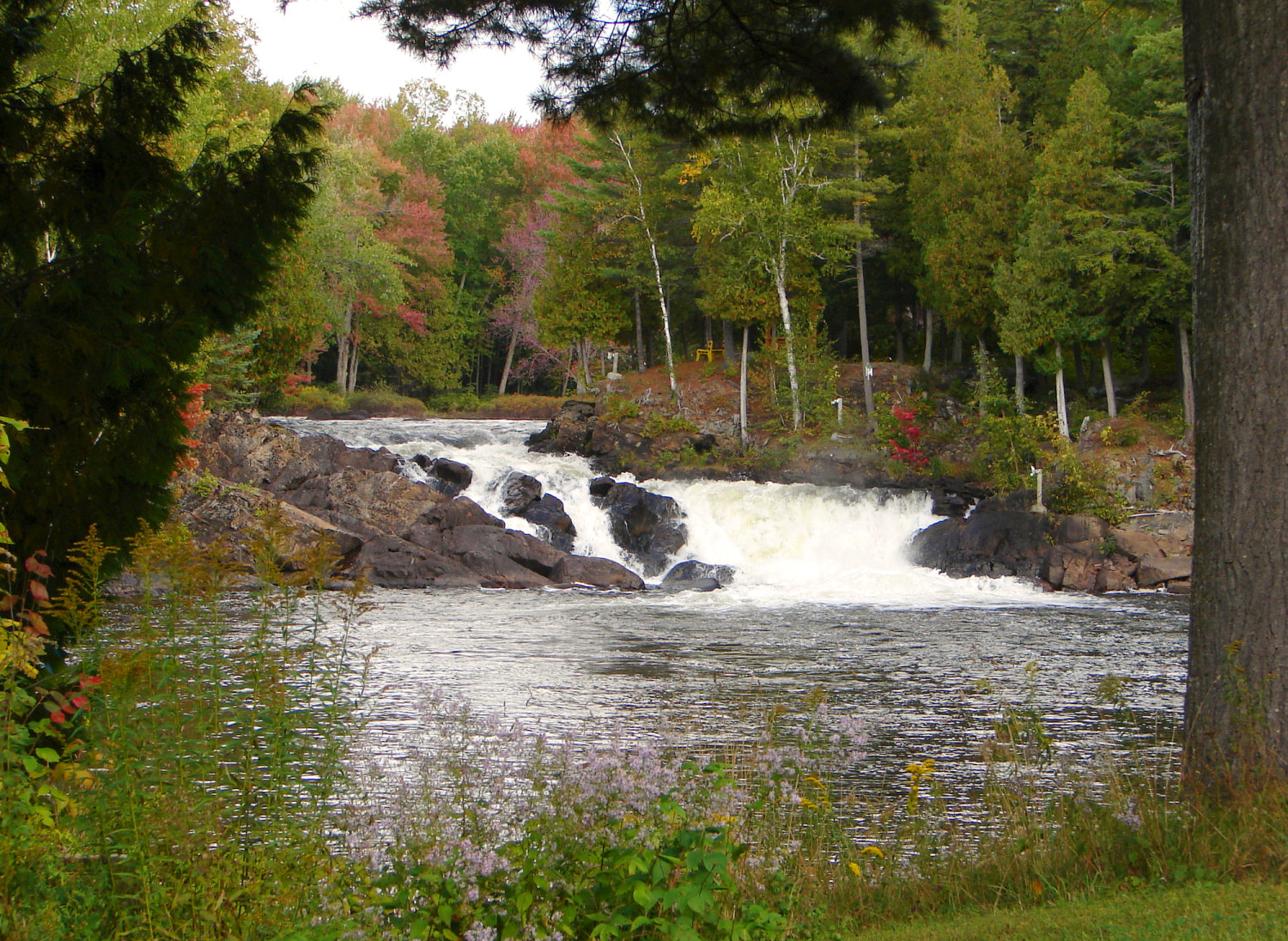
The Petite-Nation River at Ripon

The Petite-Nation River (French: rivière de la Petite Nation, pronounced [ʁivjɛʁ də la p(ə)tit nɑsjɔ̃]) is a river in western Quebec, Canada, that flows from the Laurentian Mountains to empty into the Ottawa River near Plaisance, Quebec. The river is 97 kilometres (60 mi) in length.

This river's French name refers to the Algonquin people that inhabited this region, the Weskarini, which means "people of the little nation". The valley of the Petite-Nation was part of the Seigneury de la Petite-Nation, originally owned by François de Laval, the first archbishop of New France. Joseph Papineau acquired it from the Séminaire de Québec in two parts, in 1801 and 1803. and later sold the seigneury to his son, Louis-Joseph Papineau, in 1817. Denis-Benjamin, Joseph's second son, was the lord of the seigneury. In 1929, the Papineau domain was sold off and became the Seigniory Club, which in turn was acquired by Canadian Pacific hotels, now known as Fairmont.

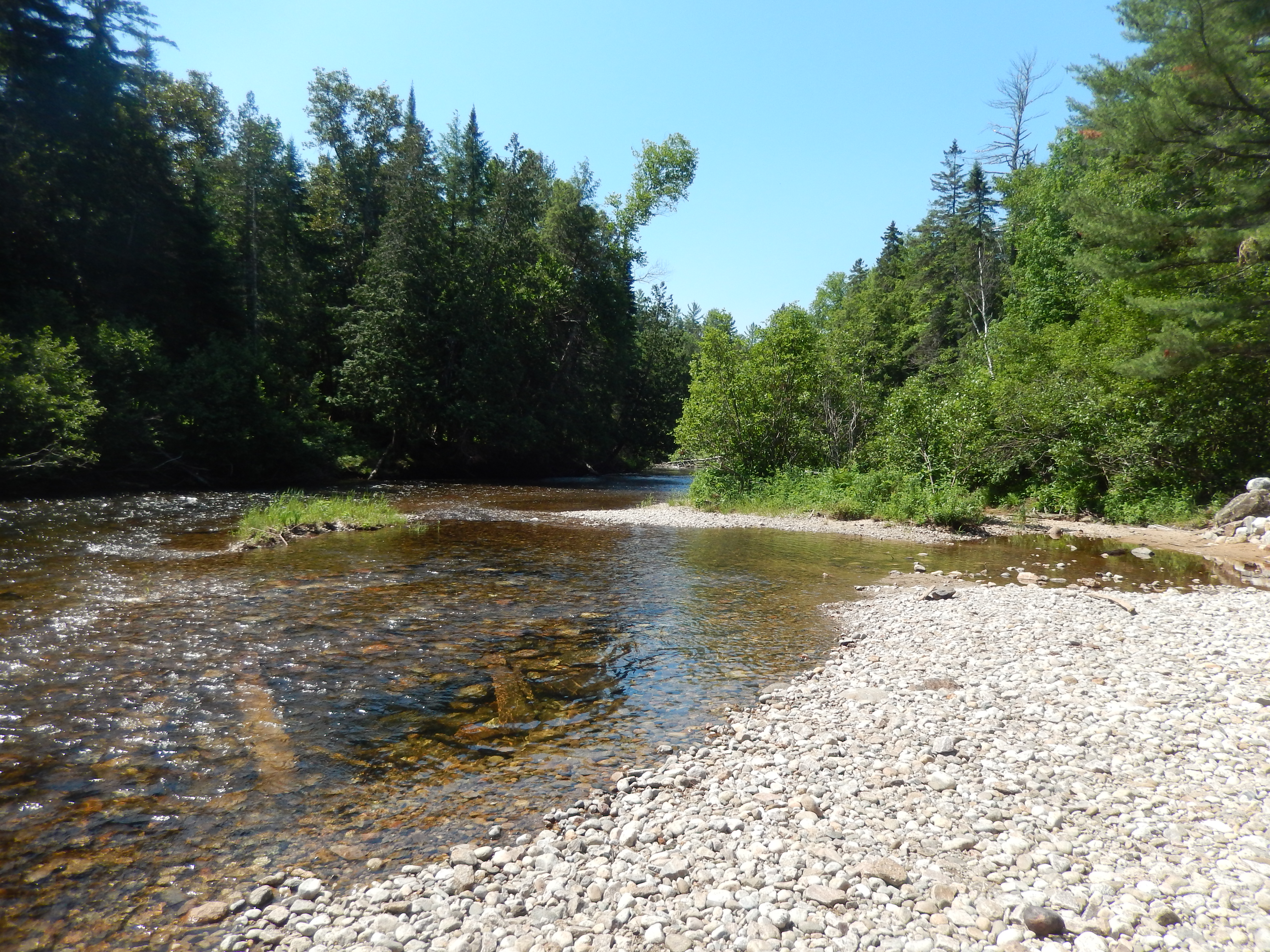
Petite-Nation River in Duhamel

Louis-Joseph Papineau built a sawmill on the river at the Chutes du Diables Falls. A village named North Nation Mills was part of his seigneury. Pine logs were floated down the river to the mill. The owners of the mill changed a few times: from the Papineau family to the Cooke family, and then the Gilmour family, and finally to the Edwards and the McClarens. The village was demolished in 1920 after the sawmill was shut down.

The area near the river's mouth was flooded by a Hydro-Québec dam on the Ottawa River. A Quebec park is located in this area.

There is also the South Nation River in Ontario which empties into the Ottawa River.
