= Argenteuil—Papineau—Des Collines =

Federal electoral district in Quebec, Canada

Quebec electoral district
- Interactive map of riding boundaries from the 2025 federal election

Federal electoral district
- Legislature: House of Commons
MP
Stéphane Lauzon
Liberal
- District created: 2013
- First contested: 2015
- Last contested: 2025
- District webpage: profile, map

Demographics
- Population (2016): 95,781
- Electors (2025): 92,957
- Area (km²): 4,958.84
- Pop. density (per km²): 19.3
- Census division(s): Argenteuil, Les Collines-de-l'Outaouais, Gatineau, Papineau, Les Pays-d'en-Haut
- Census subdivision(s): Gatineau (part), Lachute, Val-des-Monts, Brownsburg-Chatham, L'Ange-Gardien, Saint-André-Avellin, Thurso, Saint-André-d'Argenteuil, Grenville-sur-la-Rouge, Papineauville

Argenteuil—Papineau—Des Collines (French pronunciation: [aʁʒɑ̃tœj]), formerly Argenteuil—La Petite-Nation (French pronunciation: [aʁʒɑ̃tœj la p(ə)tit nɑsjɔ̃]) is a federal electoral district in Quebec.

== Demographics ==
According to the 2021 Canadian census, 2023 representation order

Racial groups: 93.0% White, 4.2% Indigenous, 1.5% Black
Languages: 89.2% French, 11.2% English
Religions: 70.3% Christian (61.3% Catholic, 9.1% Other), 28.6% None
Median income: $40,800 (2020)
Average income: $47,760 (2020)

== History ==
Argenteuil—La Petite-Nation was created by the 2012 federal electoral boundaries redistribution and was legally defined in the 2013 representation order. It came into effect upon the call of the 2015 Canadian federal election.

It was created out of parts of Argenteuil—Papineau—Mirabel (69%) and Pontiac (31%).

Following the 2022 Canadian federal electoral redistribution, the riding lost the municipalities of Wentworth-Nord, Lac-des-Seize-Îles, Wentworth, Saint-Adolphe-d'Howard, Morin-Heights, Mille-Isles and Gore to Les Pays-d'en-Haut, and gained Val-des-Monts from Pontiac, and that part of the city of Gatineau north of Autoroute 50 and east of Av. du Cheval-Blanc, and south of a line that follows Rivière Blanche to Highway 148 from the riding of Gatineau.

The riding's name changed to Argenteuil—Papineau—Des Collines as part of Bill C-25 of the 45th Canadian Parliament.

=== Members of Parliament ===
Parliament	Years	Member	Party
Argenteuil—La Petite-Nation; Riding created from Argenteuil—Papineau—Mirabel and Pontiac
42nd	2015–2019	Stéphane Lauzon	Liberal
43rd	2019–2021	Stéphane Lauzon	Liberal
44th	2021–2025	Stéphane Lauzon	Liberal
45th	2025–present	Stéphane Lauzon	Liberal

== Election results ==
Graph of election results in Argenteuil—La Petite-Nation (minor parties that never got 2% of the vote or didn't run consistently are omitted)

2025 Canadian federal election: Argenteuil—La Petite-Nation
Party	Candidate	Votes	%	±%	Expenditures
Liberal	Stéphane Lauzon	28,124	47.48	+8.32	$63,592.03
Conservative	Martin Charron	14,697	24.81	+11.33	$8,273.56
Bloc Québécois	Martin Héroux	13,520	22.83	−9.98	$19,064.98
New Democratic	Michel Welt	1,499	2.53	−4.60	$1,530.47
Green	Bertha Fuchsman-Small	807	1.36	+0.98	$862.67
People's	Lindsey Therrien	586	0.99	−4.78	$910.21
Total valid votes		59,233	98.62	+0.33	$137,961.57
Total rejected ballots		828	1.38	-0.33	
Turnout		60,061	64.61	+4.30	
Eligible voters		92,957			
Liberal notional hold		Swing		−1.51	
Source: Elections Canada

2021 federal election redistributed results
Party	Vote	%
Liberal	20,476	39.16
Bloc Québécois	17,153	32.81
Conservative	7,047	13.48
New Democratic	3,730	7.13
People's	3,016	5.77
Free	643	1.23
Green	198	0.38
Rhinoceros	15	0.03
Canada's Fourth Front	6	0.01
Marxist-Leninist	1	0.00
Total valid votes	52,285	98.29
Rejected ballots	910	1.71
Registered voters/ estimated turnout	88,205	60.31

2021 Canadian federal election: Argenteuil—La Petite-Nation
Party	Candidate	Votes	%	±%	Expenditures
Liberal	Stéphane Lauzon	19,371	38.3	+0.5	$85,937.45
Bloc Québécois	Yves Destroismaisons	17,842	35.3	-1.0	$26,497.70
Conservative	Marie Louis-Seize	6,547	12.9	+0.8	$9,894.45
New Democratic	Michel Welt	3,390	6.7	-0.8	$1,377.40
People's	Marc Vachon	2,777	5.5	+4.1	$2,133.60
Free	Paul Lynes	686	1.4	N/A	$413.64
Total valid votes/expense limit		50,613	98.2	–	$113,826.75
Total rejected ballots		933	1.8		
Turnout		51,546	61.2		
Registered voters		84,238			
Liberal hold		Swing		+0.8	
Source: Elections Canada

2019 Canadian federal election: Argenteuil—La Petite-Nation
Party	Candidate	Votes	%	±%	Expenditures
Liberal	Stéphane Lauzon	18,896	37.79	-5.47	$72,447.85
Bloc Québécois	Yves Destroismaisons	18,167	36.34	+17.68	$4,675.45
Conservative	Marie Louis-Seize	6,044	12.09	+0.97	$16,231.98
New Democratic	Charlotte Boucher Smoley	3,758	7.52	-17.26	$4,667.18
Green	Marjorie Valiquette	2,411	4.82	+2.63	$1,120.53
People's	Sherwin Edwards	721	1.44		none listed
Total valid votes/expense limit		49,997	98.37		
Total rejected ballots		828	1.63	+0.47	
Turnout		50,825	63.37	-2.17	
Eligible voters		80,202			
Liberal hold		Swing		-11.58	
Source: Elections Canada

2015 Canadian federal election: Argenteuil—La Petite-Nation
Party	Candidate	Votes	%	±%	Expenditures
Liberal	Stéphane Lauzon	22,093	43.26	+29.52	$52,794.82
New Democratic	Chantal Crête	12,650	24.77	-20.24	$46,712.51
Bloc Québécois	Jonathan Beauchamp	9,525	18.65	-4.62	-
Conservative	Maxime Hupé-Labelle	5,680	11.12	-3.59	$24,593.67
Green	Audrey Lamarche	1,118	2.19	-0.44	$839.35
Total valid votes/Expense limit		51,066	100.0		$213,069.11
Total rejected ballots		601	–	–	
Turnout		51,667	65.54	–	
Eligible voters		78,836			
Source: Elections Canada

2011 federal election redistributed results
Party	Vote	%
New Democratic	19,764	45.01
Bloc Québécois	10,216	23.27
Conservative	6,462	14.71
Liberal	6,034	13.74
Green	1,156	2.63
Others	283	0.64

== See also ==
- List of Canadian electoral districts
- Historical federal electoral districts of Canada
