= Dry Island (New York) =

Submerged island in St. Lawrence River

Coordinates: 44°53′18″N 75°10′12″W

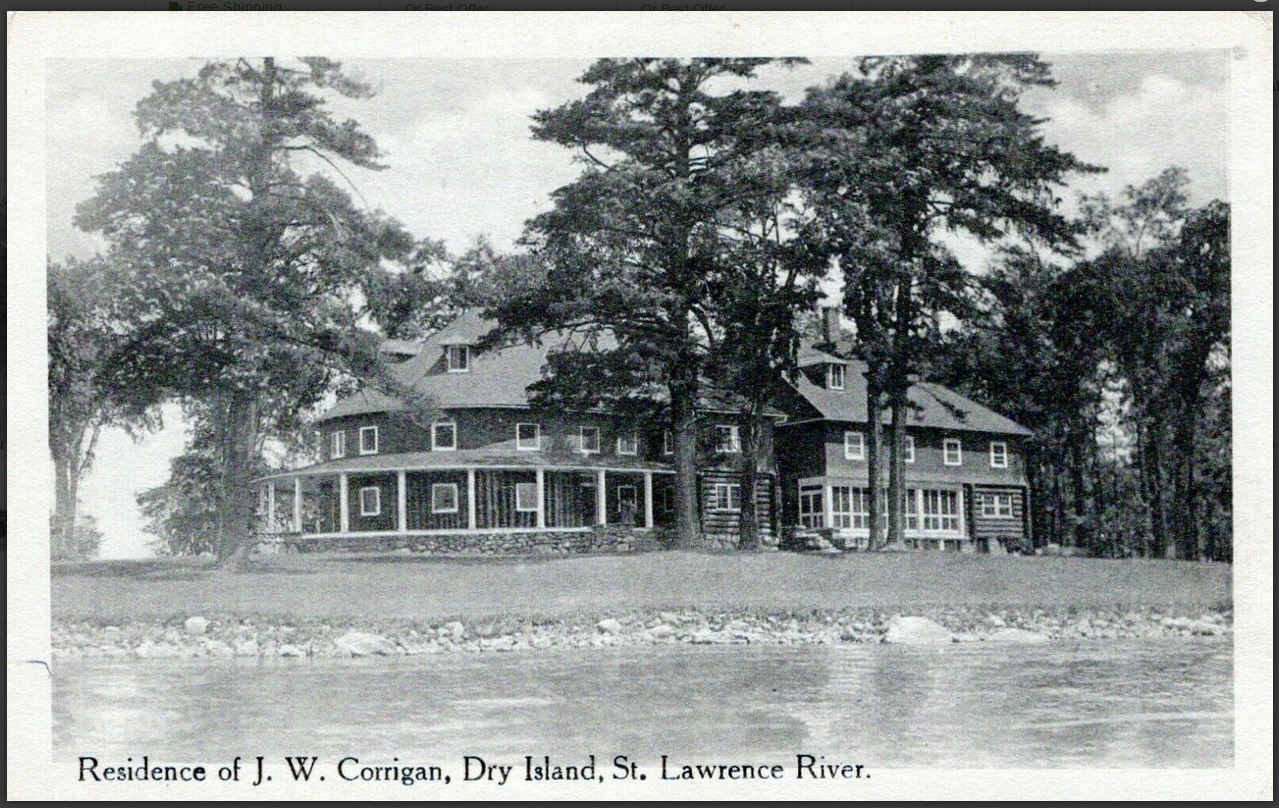
Corrigan residence on Dry Island, circa 1928

Dry Island is the name of a now-submerged island in the St. Lawrence River in the United States. It was also the name of a private estate which encompassed the entire island. The estate was built by James C. Corrigan, a multi-millionaire from Cleveland, Ohio. Corrigan purchased the island in 1901, and in 1904 began the erection of a large house, docks, boathouses, service buildings, and other features on the property. Corrigan purchased the nearby Canada Island to add to the estate.

After Corrigan's death in 1908, his son, James W. Corrigan, added to the house. It sat abandoned from some years in the 1920s. After James W. Corrigan's death, his widow, Laura Mae Corrigan, sold Dry Island to the Morrisburg-Waddington Ferry Co., which utilized it as a pleasure ground for ferry passengers. It was sold again to American investors in 1935, and the house turned into a hotel named Chateau Waddington. The hotel was destroyed by fire in 1938.

Corrigan Island was submerged below Lake St. Lawrence in 1957.

== Purchase by James Corrigan ==
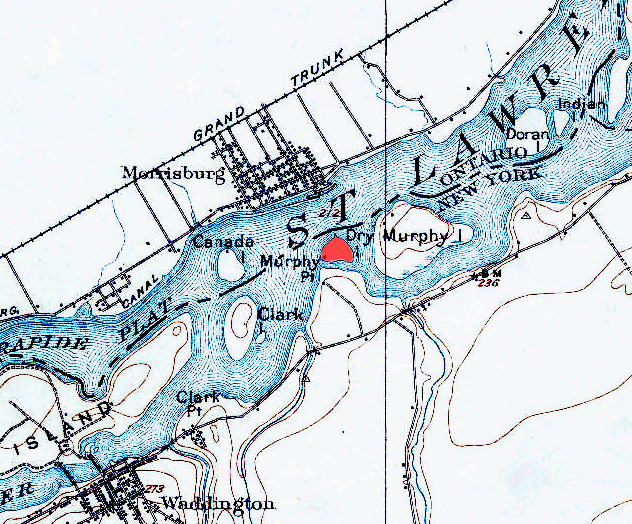
Location of Dry Island in 1905, before its 1932 inundation

In the summer of 1901, Corrigan visited the Morrisburg, Ontario, area and became enamored of Dry Island, a 25-acre (10 ha) densely wooded island in the St. Lawrence River located at foot of the Rapide Plat where the Little River (the south channel of the St. Lawrence) met the main channel. He purchased Dry Island, which was only a three-minute boat ride from Morrisburg, from Capt. W.J. Murphy on October 17, 1901. He had the island immediately seeded with thousands of American black walnut trees. Corrigan and various family members used the island as a campground from 1901 to 1904.

In the spring of 1904, Corrigan had the channel between Dry Island and Murphy Point dredged to make it passable for pleasure watercraft.

=== Estate construction ===
Corrigan began construction of a summer residence on the west end of the island in September 1904. During temperate months, he resided in a tent on the grounds to oversee the home's construction.

The structure was a Rustic-style house (Note: The residence was similar in style to the Log Lodge at the Lucerne-in-Quebec development near Montebello, Quebec. The Log Lodge is Rustic in style.) with walls constructed of logs which came from large cypress trees in South Carolina. It was square in shape, three stories high, and seated on stone foundations that extended 6 feet (1.8 m) into the ground. Hardwood was used for the floors, ceilings, and paneling throughout the residence. The north, west, and south sides of the house were surrounded by 12-foot (3.7 m) wide verandahs. There were a total of 38 rooms, 25 of which were double bedrooms, each with its own private bath. There were another 12 stand-alone bathrooms in the house. The main entrance led to a large foyer dominated by a stone fireplace with a 70-foot (21 m) high stone chimney. There was a ballroom, large butler's pantry, pastry kitchen, spacious main kitchen, and rooms for the butlers, chefs, maids, and groundskeepers. There was also an elevator and telephone system. The home was appointed with heavy, luxury furniture constructed of bird's eye maple and expensive oriental rugs. The stuffed heads of bison, deer, elk, and other animals were mounted on walls throughout the place. Two rows of Chinese willows were planted around the house. The residence was finished by summer of 1905.

Dry Island also sported bridle paths, tennis courts, numerous lawns, formal gardens, and stables. It had its own electrical power plant, located on the east end of the island, with all electricity lines buried underground. A carpentry, ice house, machine shop, and storehouses on the grounds. There were two large boathouses on the eastern side each with a marine railway. The island had two docks on the north side, a dock at the northeast corner, a dock on the south side, and at the boathouses. There was even a small dry dock.

Considered "a residential showplace", the home alone cost $20,000 (equivalent to $544,000 in 2024), with the rest of the island's improvements coming in at another $580,000 (equivalent to $15,787,000 in 2024). The furnishings cost an additional $50,0000 (equivalent to $1,361,000 in 2024).

=== Home of the Ida May ===
Corrigan also purchased a gasoline powered yacht, which was permanently docked at Dry Island. It was 95 feet (29 m) long, had a 16-foot (4.9 m) beam, drew 4 feet (1.2 m), and featured a torpedo stern. All lighting on the yacht was electric, and the gasoline engine charged a battery so lights could be used when the yacht was not running. The craft featured 2,000 US gallons (7,600 L; 1,700 imp gal) fuel tanks fore and aft, giving it an estimated range of 2,000 miles (3,200 km).

At the time, it was the largest gasoline powered boat on the St. Lawrence River, and its 200 horsepower (150 kW), six cylinder engine could make 17.5 miles per hour (28.2 km/h), making it locally famous and the fastest yacht on the St. Lawrence River.

Corrigan named the yacht Ida May. Its deck was made of yellow pine planking and the deckhouse of mahogany. The roof of the deckhouse featured a canopy which was large enough to cover several wicker chairs and setees. A promenade surrounded the canopy, and there was a raised pilothouse behind the deckhouse.

The interior of the yacht was also finished in mahogany, accented with white paint and gilt moldings. There was a stateroom with a double berth forward. The aft portion had eight berths, which folded up and against the wall when not in use (similar to sleeping berths on a Pullman car. A partition separated the area into a men's and women's side. With the berths up, these areas served as a salon and dining room.

In the spring of 1907, the yacht's cabin was rebuilt and the sides raised 14 inches (360 mm) to make the Ida May capable of weathering severe storms on Lake Erie.

Included with the yacht were two 1/5 horsepower (0.15 kW) tenders.

=== Canada Island ===
In July 1904, Corrigan purchased the nearby Canada Island, Ontario, Canada, for $2,500 (equivalent to $68,000 in 2024). Also known as Sheep Island and Doran's Island, Canada Island was a popular camping ground for residents of the Morrisburg area. Corrigan sold the island to Price McKinney less than a year later.

James Corrigan occupied Dry Island every summer for the rest of his life, entertaining there lavishly. He held flashy weekend parties, mounted a huge fireworks display every July 4, and even brought Broadway musicals to the island, complete with their original casts. Locals in Canada and the U.S. began referring to Dry Island as Corrigan's Island.

== James W. Corrigan ownership ==
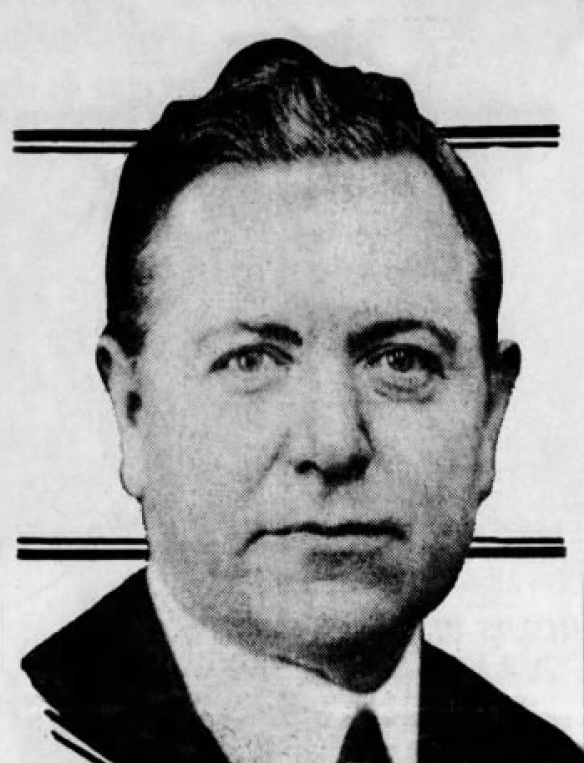
James W. Corrigan Jr.

James W. Corrigan inherited Dry Island when his father died. He added a semi-circular addition to the west side of the house in 1912. He converted the fireplace in the former main foyer into a back-to-back fireplace that served both areas. A spacious verandah surrounded the new addition. He allowed the Canadian government to use the house there as a convalescent hospital during World War I. He attempted to sell the island in 1920, but was unsuccessful.

After James Jr. died of a heart attack on January 23, 1928, his wife Laura Mae Corrigan inherited the land and continued to spend summers on Dry Island. Laura Mae stopped visiting Dry Island in the late 1920s. The house was closed up, and the island became overgrown with shrubs and weeds.

== Subsequent owners ==
The Morrisburg-Waddington Ferry Co. of Morrisburg, Ontario, purchased Dry Island for $600,000 in October 1933. A ferry terminal was built in the spring of 1934, and in June the Amecan Hotel opened in the Corrigan home. The ferry company also built a bridge to the U.S. mainland in July 1934.

The island was sold again in June 1935 to the Island Hotel Corporation, an American company owned by police court judge John W. Whalen and his son, Amos, of Massena, New York. They gave the hotel a new name, Chateau Waddington. The place proved so popular that the U.S. government built a customs house and immigration station on the island.

Chateau Waddington was destroyed by fire at noon on October 23, 1938, when a spark from the chimney landed on the wood shingle roof and set the structure ablaze.

== Submerged by Lake St. Lawrence ==
Corrigan Island was submerged below Lake St. Lawrence in 1957 and 1958, after the lake was created by the construction of the Moses-Saunders Power Dam.

== Bibliography ==
- Carter, J. Smyth (1905). The Story of Dundas: Being a History of the County of Dundas From 1784 to 1904. Iroquois, Ontario: St. Lawrence News. OCLC 300129120.
- Morgan, Eleanor Wickware (1964). "Up the Front": A Story of Morrisburg. Toronto: Ryerson Press. OCLC 451172.
