= Montebello station (Quebec) =

Railway station in Quebec, Canada

Coordinates: 45.6498°N 74.9426°W

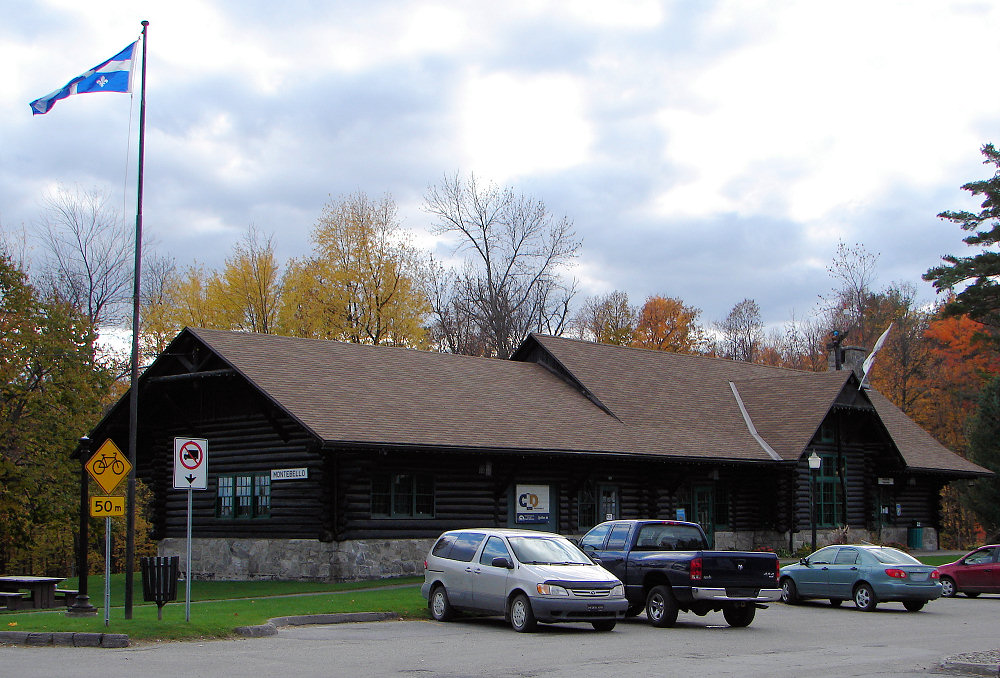
The building now serves as a tourist info centre.

Montebello station was a Canadian Pacific railway station in Montebello, Quebec, which served the nearby Château Montebello hotel and the community of Montebello. Like the hotel, it was built of Red Cedar logs.

The building now serves as a tourist information centre.

Preceding station	Canadian Pacific Railway	Following station
Papineauville toward Ottawa	Ottawa – Montreal via Montebello	Fassett toward Montreal Place Viger
