= Château Montebello =

Historic hotel in Montebello, Quebec, Canada

Fairmont Le Château Montebello
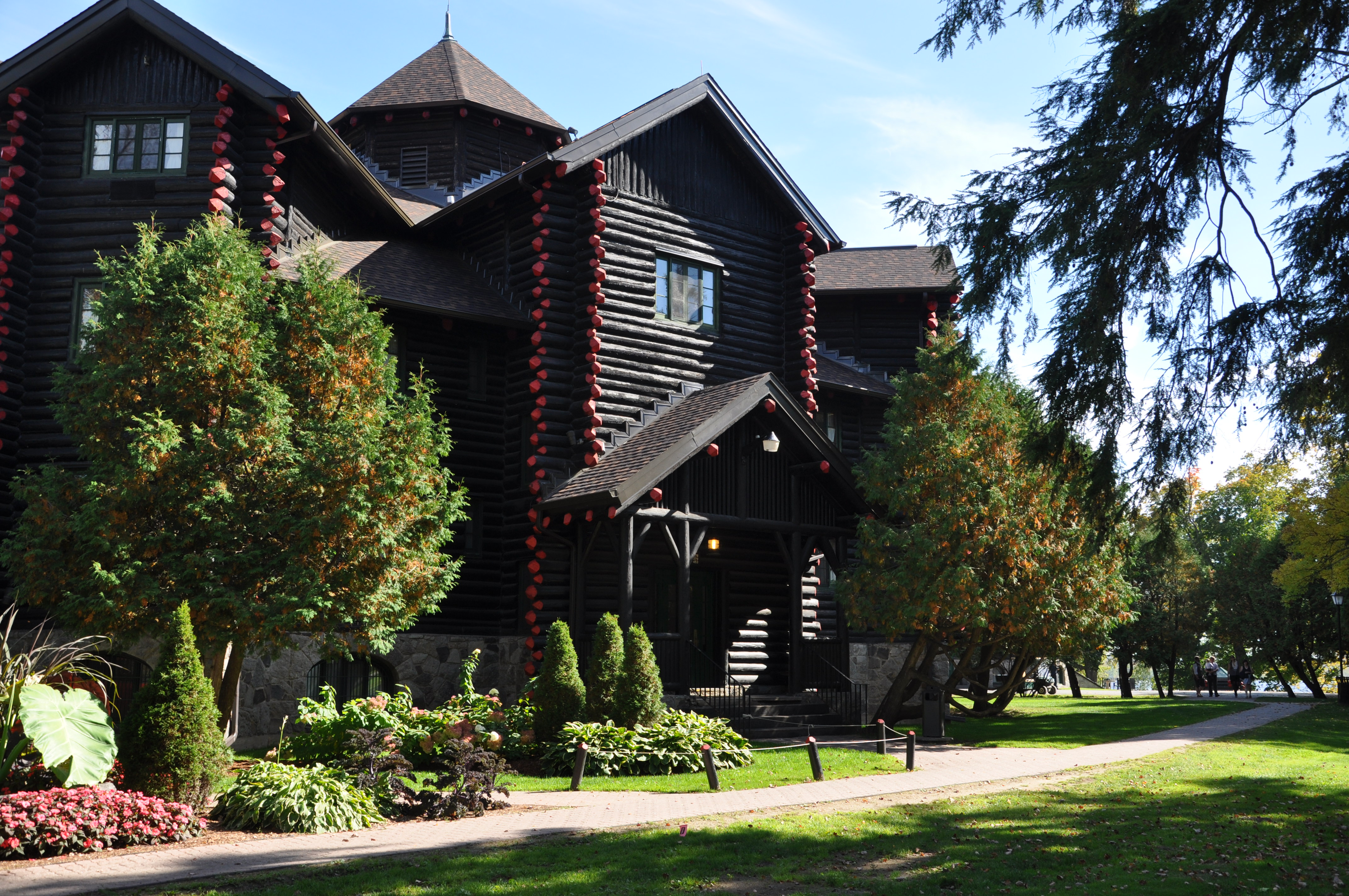

- Location within Quebec
- Former names: Seigniory Club; Château Montebello

General information
- Architectural style: Scandinavian log style
- Location: 392 rue Notre-Dame, Montebello, Quebec, Canada, JOV 1LO
- Coordinates: 45.645°N 74.95°W
- Opening: 1 July 1930
- Owner: in receivership
- Operator: Fairmont Hotels and Resorts

Design and construction
- Main contractor: Victor Nymark

Other information
- Number of rooms: 211
- Number of suites: 14

Website
- www.fairmont.com/montebello

The Fairmont Le Château Montebello, formerly and commonly known as the Château Montebello, is a historic hotel and resort complex in Montebello, Quebec, Canada. The resort complex includes a large game reserve and a large wooden structure. The wooden hotel structure was developed by Victor Nymark.

Opened in 1930, the rustic-styled hotel contains 211 guest rooms and suites. Initially owned by the Canadian Pacific Railway company, the building is considered one of Canada's grand railway hotels. After its completion, the property was leased to the private Seigniory Club until 1970, when Canadian Pacific Railway converted the property into a public resort. The resort property was last owned by the Evergrande Group but was placed in receivership in November 2025. The resort remains in operation despite being in receivership, and is managed by Fairmont Hotels and Resorts.

== Location ==
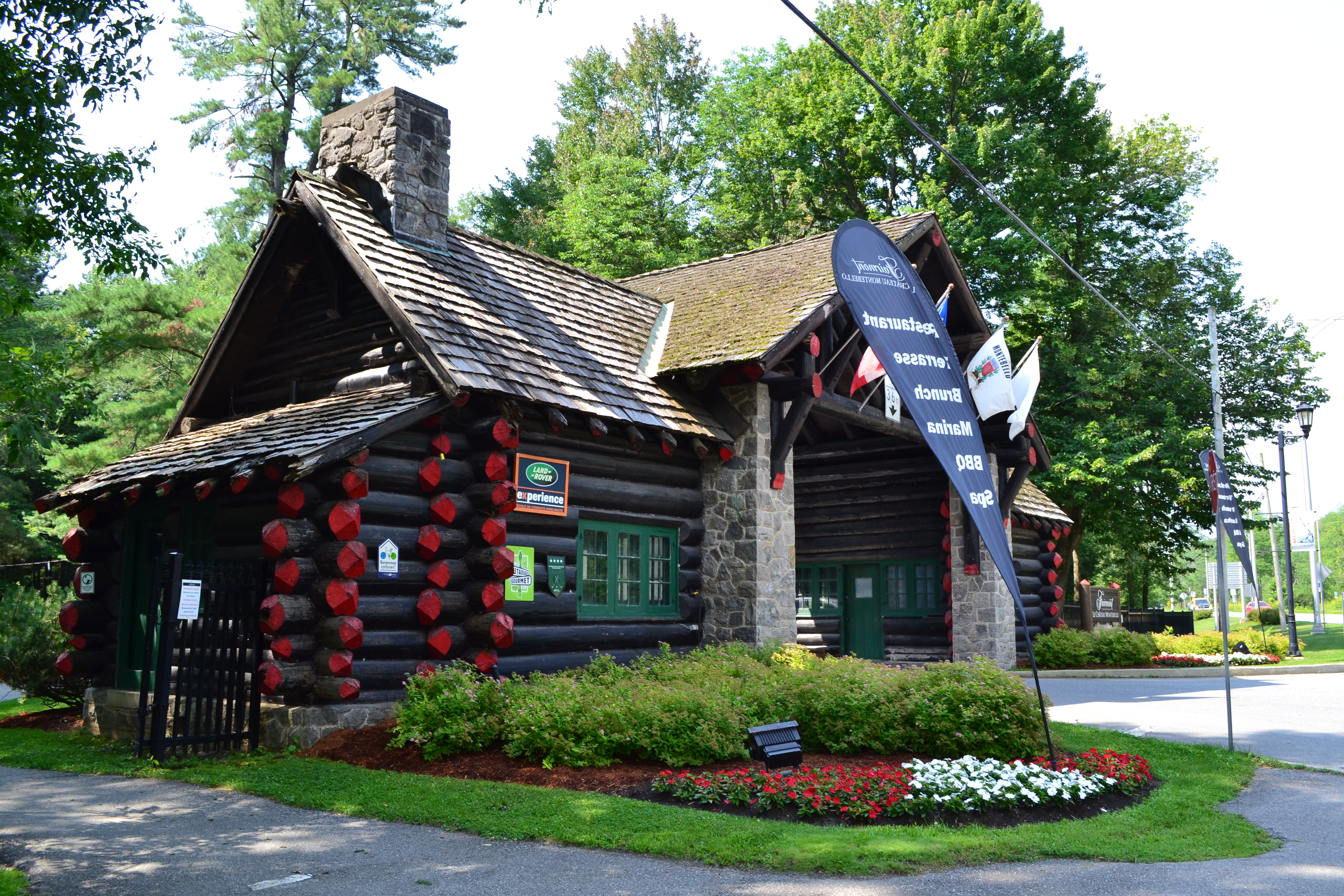
Gateway to the southern section of the resort on rue Notre Dame.

The Château Montebello is located at 392 rue Notre Dame, in the western section of Montebello, Quebec, a municipality in the Outaouais region of the province. The road forms a part of Quebec Route 148, a provincial highway that connects Ottawa to Montreal. The roadway bisects the property, dividing it into two sections. The property south of rue Notre Dame contains the main buildings of the resort, whereas the section north of the road contains the resort's golf course, and hiking trails. The hotel property is bounded by a roadway, natural waterway, and forests. To the south, the resort is bounded by the Ottawa River, which serves as the border between Ontario and Quebec. To the west, the property is bounded by Quebec Route 323, a provincial highway that connects Montebello to Mont Tremblant. The community of Montebello is situated to the west of Quebec Route 323.

In addition to facilities located on property, the resort is situated near several attractions. North of the resort lies Parc Omega, a safari park featuring local wildlife. Situated 16 kilometres (9.9 mi) west of the resort is Plaisance National Park, a provincial park managed by the Société des établissements de plein air du Québec.

== Resort grounds ==
The Château Montebello is a year-round resort situated within old-growth forests, and past outcroppings of the Canadian Shield. The resort is on one of the last surviving land grants made by 17th-century French monarchy to early settlers of New France. The resort grounds includes a number of facilities supporting the activities offered by the resort. This includes a 114-slip marina, and the marina clubhouse, in the southwestern section of the resort. Open from mid-May to mid-October, the marina is able to accommodate ships up to 18.3-metre-long (60 ft). Guests that dock at the marina are provided access to the resort amenities.

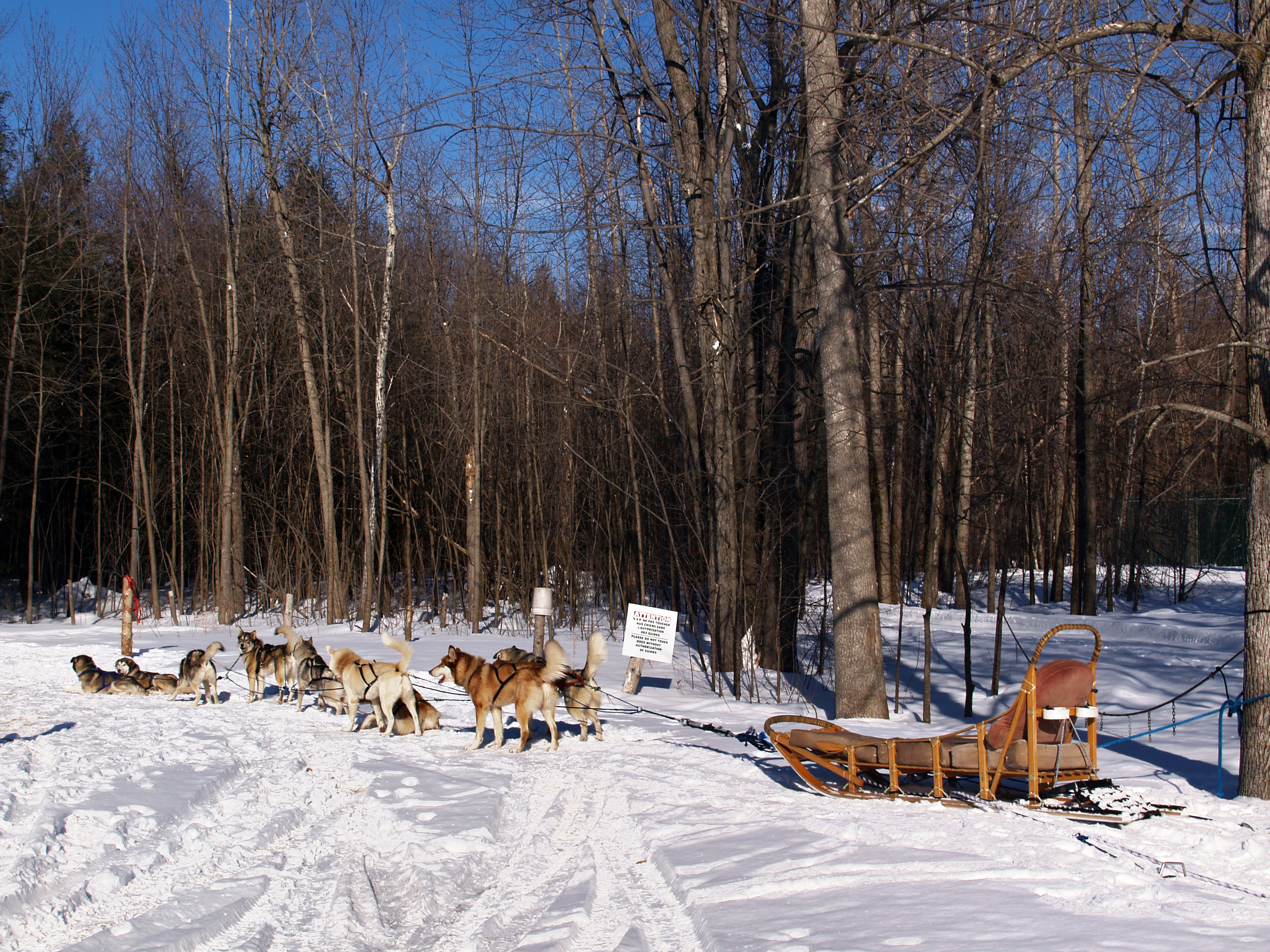
The resort grounds includes a number of shared use paths for hiking, cross-country skiing, and dogsledding.

The resort grounds also contains 60 kilometres (37 mi) of hiking trails, and 26 kilometres (16 mi) of cross-country skiing trails. In the section of the resort north of rue Notre Dame is an 18-hole, par 70 golf course. Designed by golf course architect Stanley Thompson, the course also contains the Golf Club Terrace, and a bar at its 18th hole. Other outdoor facilities at the resort include two skating rinks for ice hockey and skating, a snow tubing hill, a curling rink, and two tennis courts. The resort also operates rental and support facilities for dogsledding, snowshoeing, snowmobiling, biking, fishing, horseback riding, and kayaking.

The resort also contains a 263 square kilometres (65,000 acres) game reserve, known as the Fairmont Kenauk at Le Château Montebello. Containing more than 70 lakes within its boundaries, the preserve is home to a fish hatchery, and contains over 200 species of birds, and 50 other animal species. The resort employs biologists and naturalists in an effort to preserve the resources in the area. The resort operates 13 self-sufficient chalets and cabins within the game preserve. The cabins and chalets contain one to five bedrooms.

West of the resort's main buildings, is Manoir Papineau, a National Historic Site of Canada. The turreted house functions as a historical museum. It is the only structure in the Chateau area which doesn't conform to the log cabin motif of the resort.

=== Hotel building ===
==== Architecture ====
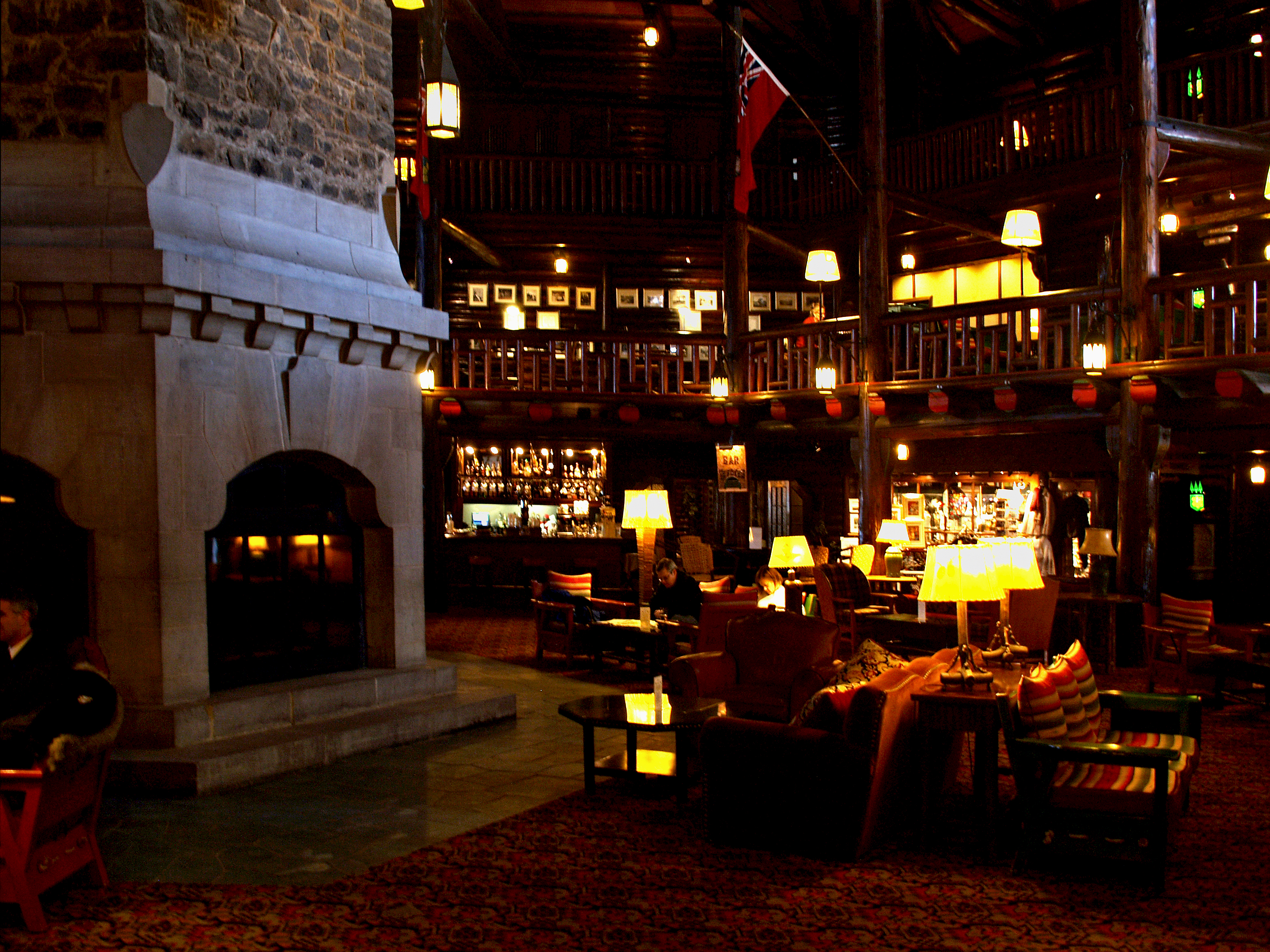
The central lobby of the hotel building features a large central fireplace surrounded by a mezzanine.

The resort's hotel building is a 113,300 cubic metres (4,000,000 cubic feet) large wooden structure, and claims to be the largest log building in the world. Construction for the hotel building was overseen by Finnish immigrant Victor Nymark, a master log builder who immigrated to Canada in 1924 after successfully completing a three-year course at Vaasa Industrial School. As work on the building began before the hotel's final design plans were completed, Nymark's construction crew occasionally proceeded without blueprints to guide them. The three resort buildings erected in 1930 were built using 10,000 western red cedar logs shipped from British Columbia. The log walls are painted black on the outside, although its interiors maintained the natural wood colouring. The building also featured 500,000 hand-slit cedar roof shakes and 166 kilometres (103 mi) of wooden moulding.

The completed structure saw a large log-building housing 211 guest rooms, and suites, with four wings extending outward from the central lobby in a star formation. Log rafters hanging above the lobby span nearly 21.3-metre-long (70 ft). The rotunda-shaped lobby serves as the centre of the hotel, featuring a three-storey atrium, built around a massive stone fireplace. The fireplace's chimney rises 20 metres (65 ft) above the ground, and is surrounded by a mezzanine, and a third-floor balcony.

==== Hotel facilities ====
In addition to lodgings, the hotel operates a number of restaurants, and other food-based services within its buildings. The hotel's main dining room is Aux Chantignoles. Other dining facilities at the hotel include Le Riverain and The Seigneurie Bar. The hotel also has 17 event rooms, comprising a total of 1,580 square metres (17,005 sq ft) of space for conferences, and other social events.

The hotel also operates several recreational facilities, such as a fitness centre. The hotel's 23 metres (75 ft) indoor swimming pool is housed in a separate log cabin accessible from the hotel by tunnel. The indoor pool area features painted totem poles supporting the roof. The hotel is also equipped with two whirlpool baths, two saunas, and a fitness centre. The hotel also features a 371.6 square metres (4,000 sq ft) spa, with eight treatment rooms, and a couples suite.

== History ==
François de Laval, the first Bishop of Quebec, purchased the property in 1674 from the French East India Company. The Quebec Seminary inherited it from Laval. In 1801, the land was sold to the family of Joseph Papineau. His son, Louis-Joseph Papineau, built a turreted stone mansion, the Manoir Papineau.

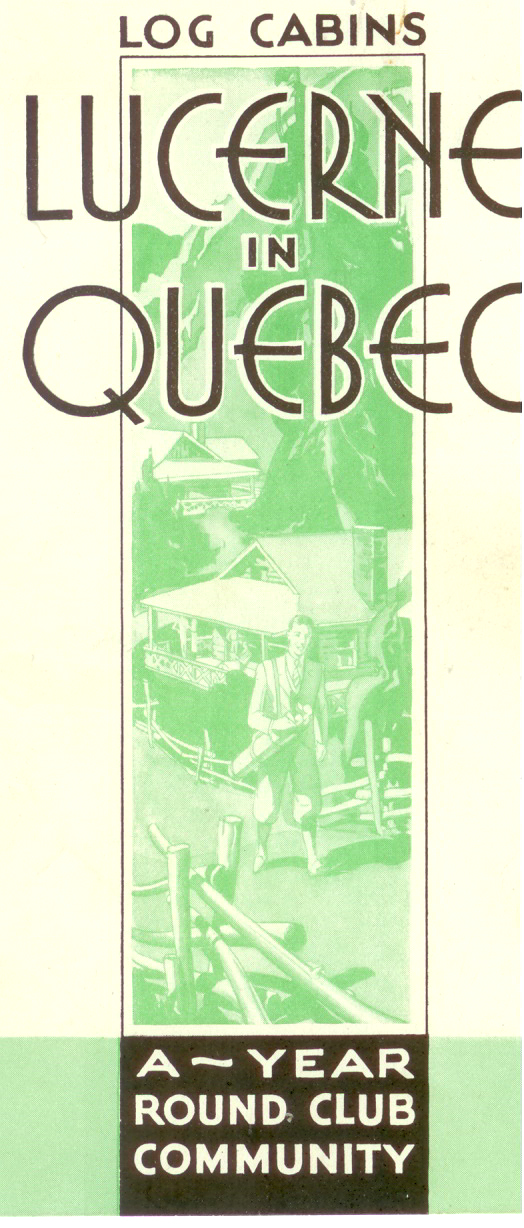
Original advertisement for the project 1930.

In the late 1920s, Harold M. Saddlemire, a Swiss-American entrepreneur, acquired a site along the Ottawa River, on land that formerly formed part of the seigneurial system of New France. Saddlemire envisioned a private wilderness retreat for business and political leaders. He initially called this project "Lucerne-in-Quebec"; it subsequently came to be known as the Seigniory Club. Despite the Wall Street crash of 1929, work on the planned wilderness retreat began, as planned, in early 1930.

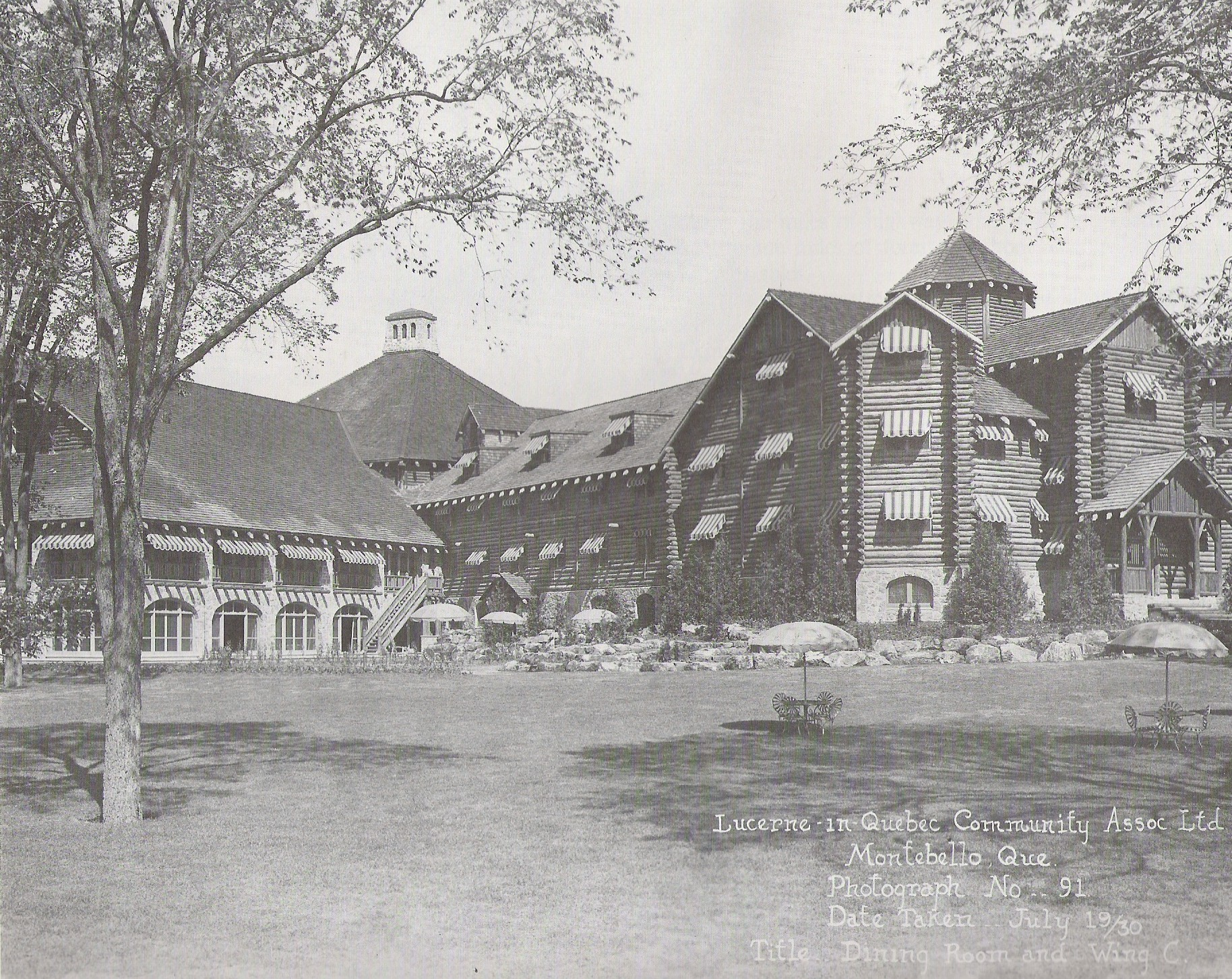
View of the resort property in July 1930, in the month of its opening.

The economic uncertainty did not delay the project, unlike many others, perhaps because the presidents of the Canadian Pacific Railway (CPR), the National Bank of Canada, the Bank of Montreal and the Royal Bank of Canada respectively, not to mention the Premier of Quebec, were all club directors. A special spur from the nearby CPR line had to be built to allow for the transport of red cedar logs and other supplies to the site. The Scandinavian log construction project was supervised by Finnish master-builder, Victor Nymark and construction manager Harold Landry Furst. Construction and woodworking teams worked in overlapping shifts around the clock using electric lighting at night. The church did not approve of working on the Sabbath; but by coincidence, the local curé was dispatched on an all-expenses paid trip to Rome for two months while the work proceeded apace. An army of 3500 laborers ensured that the project could reach completion in only four months. The club's grand opening was held on 1 July 1930. Three days after opening, a magnificent costume ball was held, attended by the Governor General of Canada.

The exclusive private retreat of the Seigniory Club took its name from the French land grant system. "Seigniory" is the anglicized version of the French seigneurie. The club was only open to an elite membership for its first 40 years of operation.

Prominent Canadian club members during this period included Lester B. Pearson, the Prime Minister of Canada. Other non-Canadian members included Queen Juliana of the Netherlands, Prince Rainier and Princess Grace of Monaco. Other prominent guests at resort include Crown Prince Akihito of Japan, Princess Juliana of the Netherlands, Bing Crosby, Perry Como, Bette Davis, Joan Crawford, and Harry S. Truman. The President of the United States Harry Truman's visit to Canada in June 1947 included a trip to the Seigniory Club retreat. Truman had "expressed the desire to fish for his first Canadian trout during his visit to the club." Edward, Prince of Wales also visited the retreat, and later revisited when he was the Duke of Windsor.

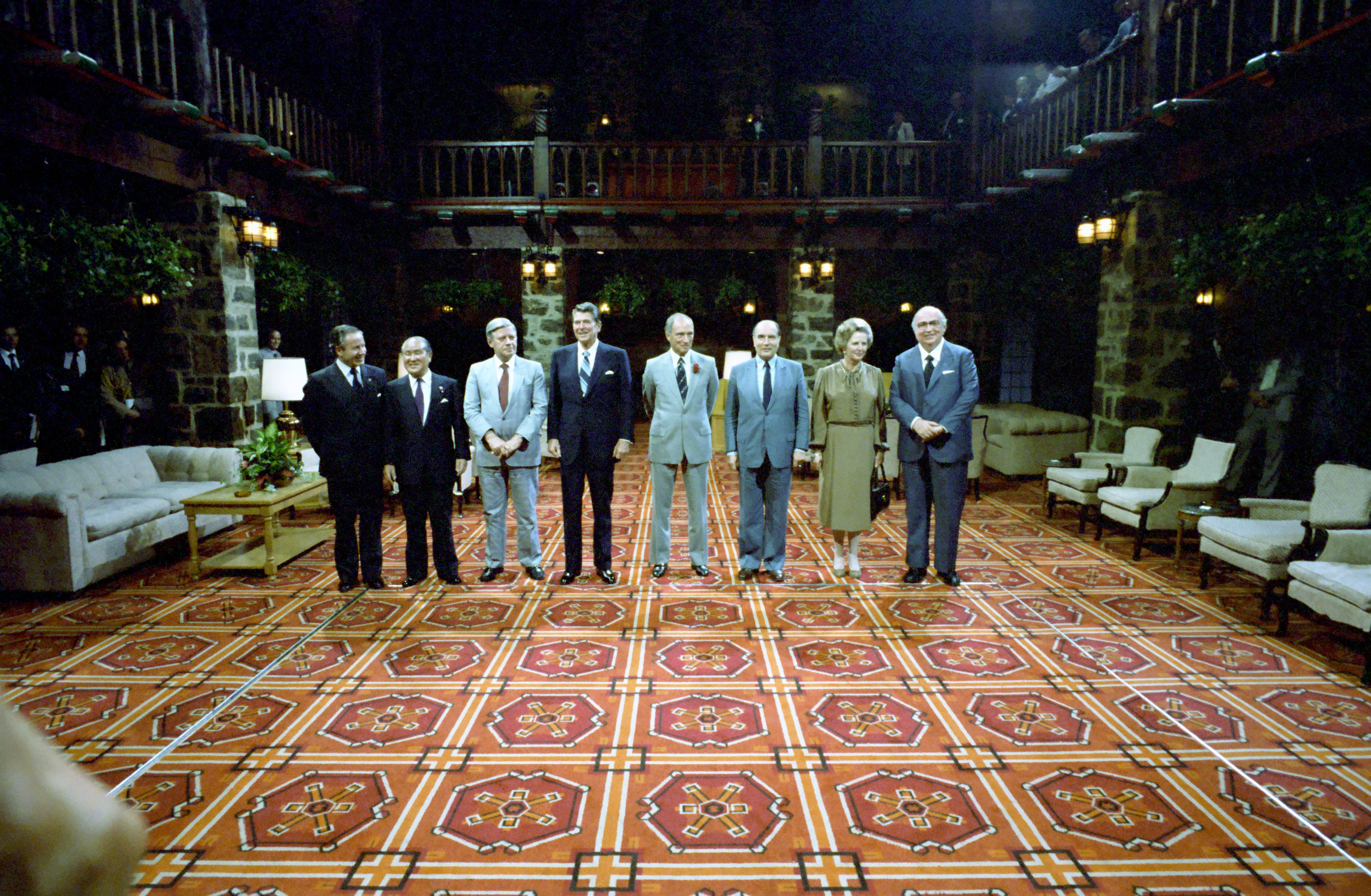
The 7th G7 summit was held at Château Montebello in 1981.

The resort remained a private retreat, owned by the CPR, and leased to the exclusive Seigniory Club until 1970, when it was converted into a public resort by Canadian Pacific Hotels, the hotel division of CPR. During this time the resort was renamed the Château Montebello.

In 1981, the Château Montebello hosted the 7th G7 summit; and leaders such as Pierre Trudeau, Margaret Thatcher, Ronald Reagan and François Mitterrand were guests along with the aides and security staffs traveling with these national leaders. In August 1983, the Bilderberg Group held its annual meeting at the resort. In October 1983, the resort hosted the ministerial meeting for NATO's Nuclear Planning Group.

In 1995, the American National Trust for Historic Preservation awarded a special membership to the Château Montebello, one of only two Canadian hotels so honoured. The other Canadian member is the Empress Hotel of Victoria, British Columbia, which was also a Canadian Pacific property.

In 2001, Canadian Pacific Hotels was reorganized as Fairmont Hotels and Resorts, adopting the name from an American company it had purchased in 1999. The resort's name was changed to the Fairmont Le Château Montebello as a part of this re-branding effort. The company continued to own the resort until the property was purchased in 2006 by the OMERS. However, Fairmont continues to manage the property.

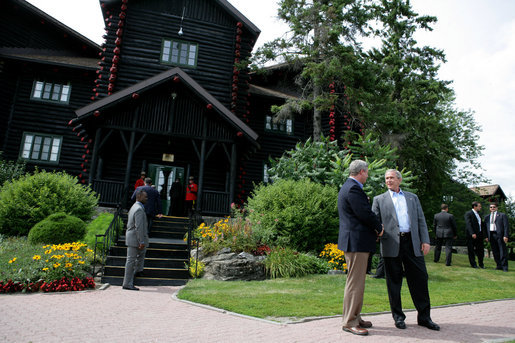
Stephen Harper with George W. Bush during the 2007 North American Leaders' Summit

In 2007 the resort hosted the Security and Prosperity Partnership of North America conference, a North American Leaders' Summit between the Prime Minister of Canada Stephen Harper, the President of Mexico Felipe Calderón, and President of the United States George W. Bush.

The resort property was purchased again by the Evergrande Group, a major Chinese real estate group making its first investment in Canada in December 2014. In November 2025, the Quebec Superior Court approved a motion by the Caisse Desjardins de Brossard to place the resort into receivership under the Bankruptcy and Insolvency Act. PricewaterhouseCoopers Inc. was appointed as the official receiver, which intends to sell the property to pay down debts. The resort remained open, continuing under the management of Fairmont Hotels and Resorts.

== See also ==
- List of G8 summit resorts
