= Manoir Papineau =

Coordinates: 45.6460°N 74.9457°W

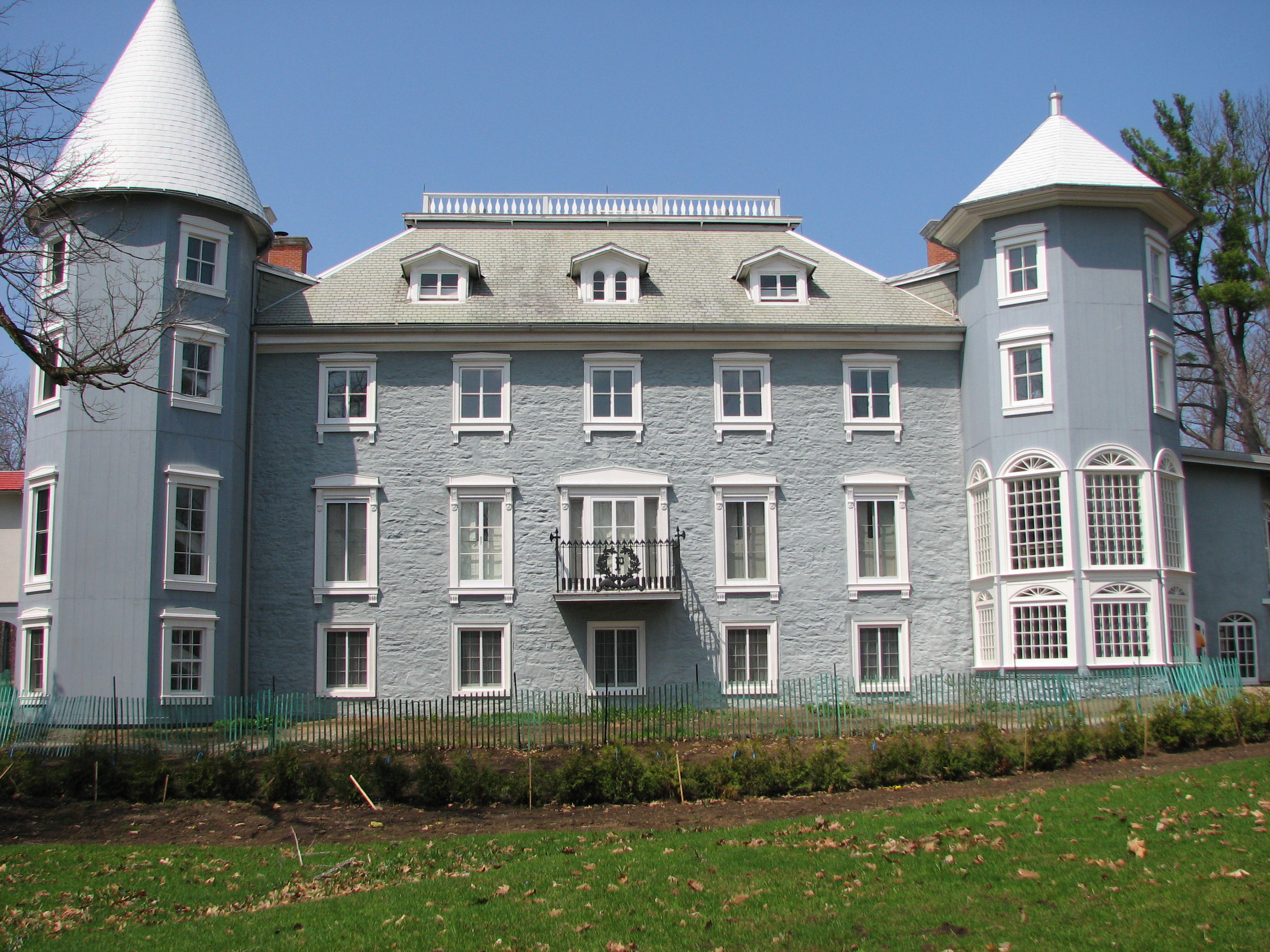

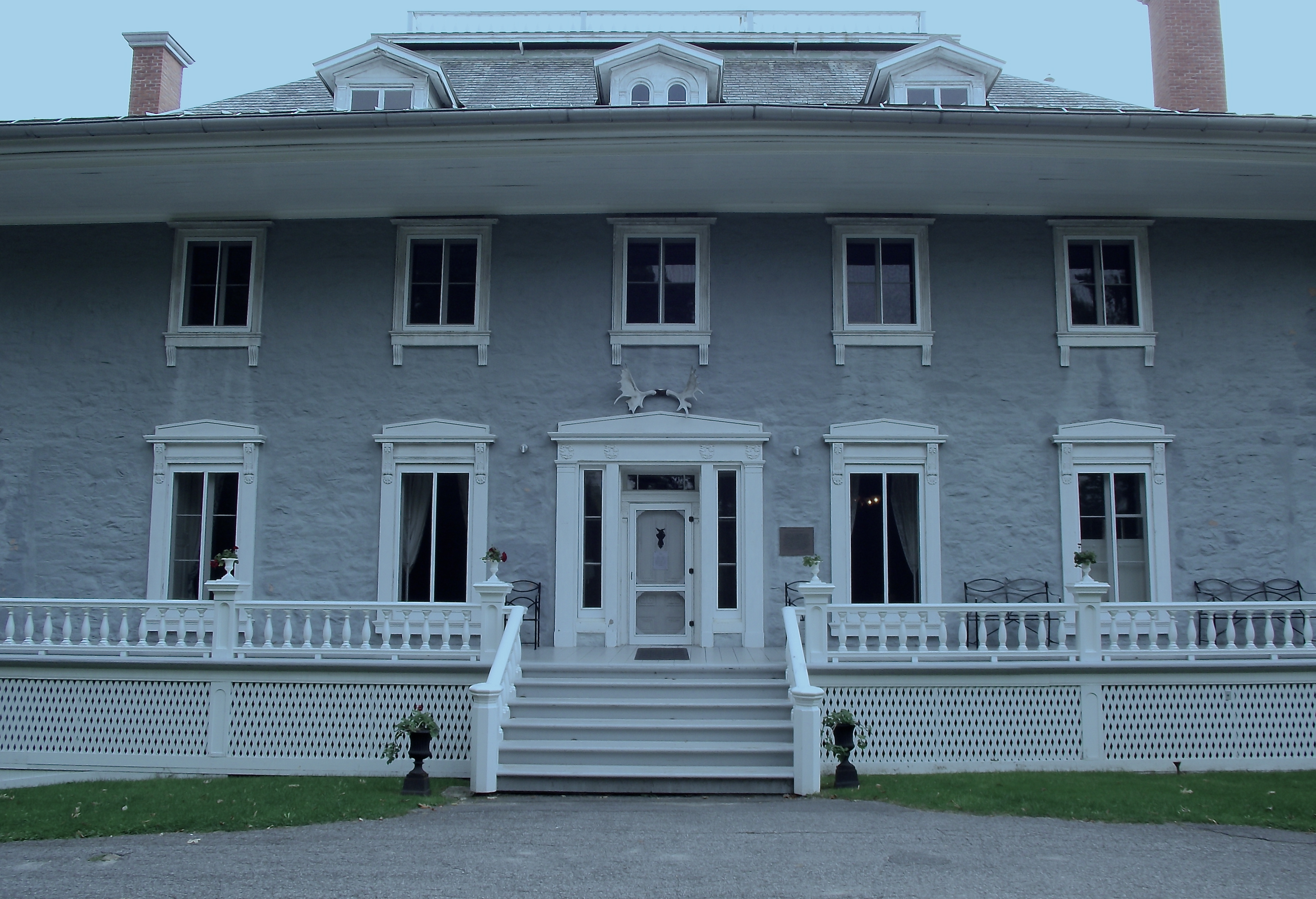

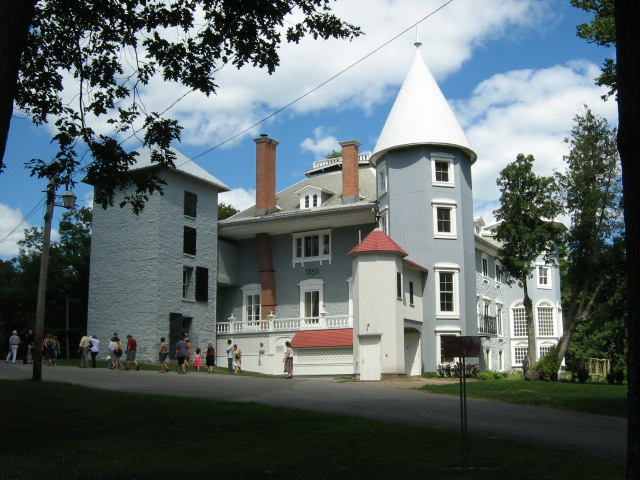
Manoir Papineau

The ‘Manoir Papineau’ was home to the Papineau family from 1850 to 1929. The house along with outbuildings, landscaped gardens and grounds (including the former family museum and granary) are now open to the public and managed by Parks Canada. The site, managed by Parks Canada since 1993, represents one of the most treasured heritage locations in the area surrounding La Petite-Nation and in the greater Ottawa River region.

It was designed primarily to commemorate Louis-Joseph Papineau (1786-1871), the man who was to become a leading figure in Canadian politics during the 19th century, as one of the first French-Canadian nationalist leaders. The sumptuous house was built after Louis-Joseph Papineau returned from political exile in Europe, during the late 1830s to mid-1840s; he lived in the manor from 1850 with his wife and five of their children until his death in 1871. His descendants lived on at the house until 1929. Some of the more notable of these included his youngest daughter Azélie, mother to Henri Bourassa the famous journalist and founder of Canadian newspaper Le Devoir. Also, Talbot Mercer Papineau (great grandson of Louis-Joseph Papineau) lawyer and decorated soldier, one of four Canadians featured in the book Tapestry of War: A Private View of Canadians in the Great War, by Sandra Gwyn. Major Papineau was portrayed by his fifth cousin, twice removed, then future Canadian Prime Minister Justin Trudeau, in the Canadian Broadcasting Corporation's telefilm, The Great War.

Built by Louis-Joseph Papineau between 1848 and 1850, the Manoir Papineau occupies a prominent spot overlooking the Ottawa River at Montebello, Quebec, Canada. The building's architecture, according to Parks Canada, “represents a blend of stylistic influences similar in many respects to that which is encountered in contemporaneous neoclassical villas. Its sculpted decor recalls the Greek Revival style. From the river, the house appears as a monumental elevation flanked by two corner towers. The facade and hip slopes of the roof present an overhang of unusual proportions, in a muted reference to the Regency style. The conic roof atop the stair tower built following a fire in 1892 is representative of the Queen Anne Revival. Finally, interior door openings between adjoining rooms were aligned to create particular interior perspectives, in keeping with French architectural tradition. The spiral staircase located in one of the towers also shows the influence of this tradition. The unusual positioning of the main reception rooms to the back of the ground floor, combined with the abundant fenestration on the lower two levels of the east tower, recall that a conservatory was once located here.” The interior of the Manor House is splendid, and is furnished with its original décor. Guided tours include the dining room; three living rooms; the bedroom of Louis-Joseph Papineau; and the bedrooms of Azelie and Ezilda Papineau.

The ‘Manoir Papineau’ was the 8th pit stop on the television show The Amazing Race Canada, season 8.
