= 7th G7 summit =

1981 international leader meeting in Canada

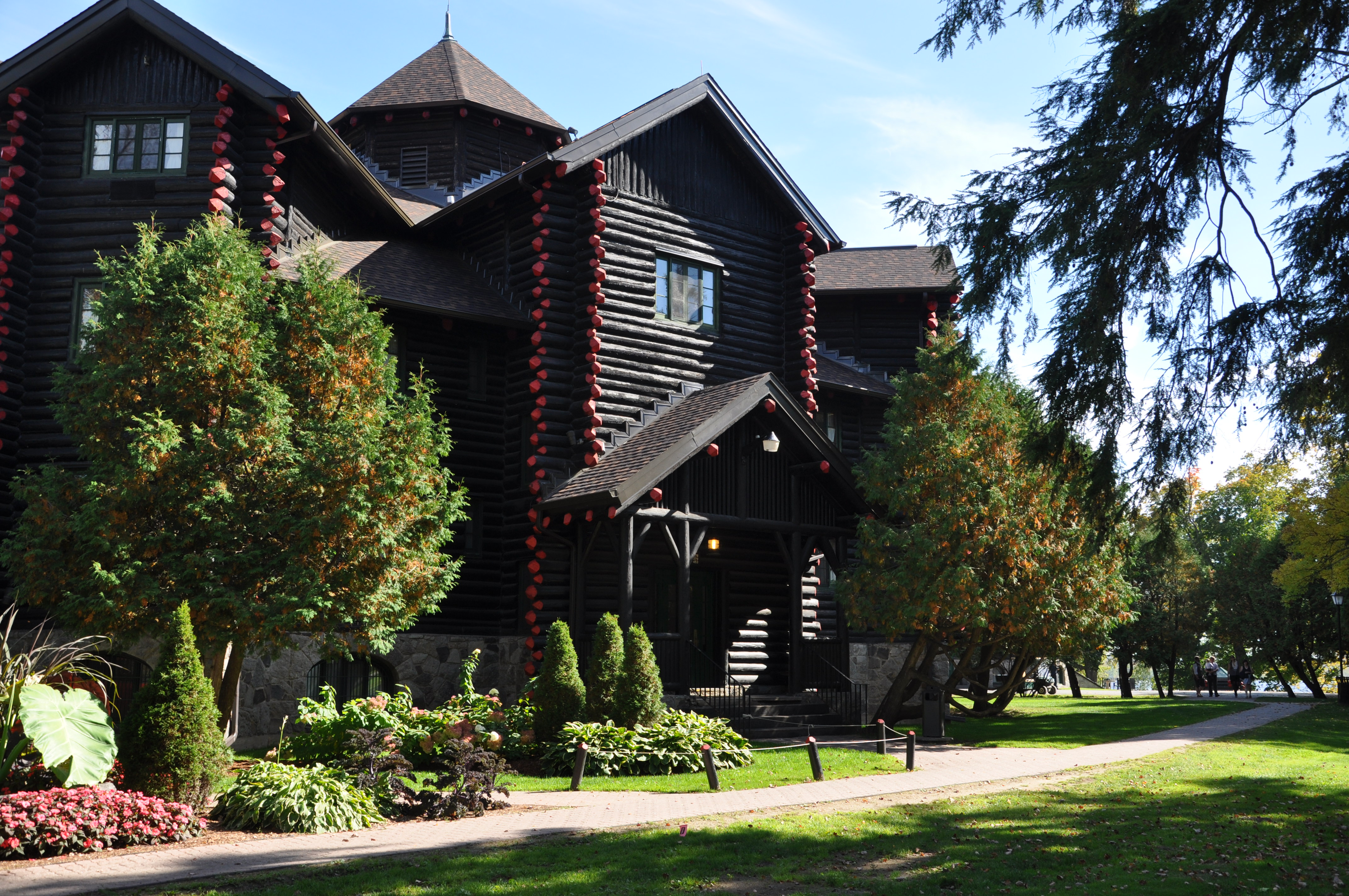
- Château Montebello in the province of Quebec
- Host country: Canada
- Dates: July 20–21, 1981
- Cities: Montebello, Quebec
- Venues: Château Montebello
- Follows: 6th G7 summit
- Precedes: 8th G7 summit

The 7th G7 Summit was called the Ottawa Summit, and was held in Montebello, Quebec, Canada and nearby Ottawa between July 20 and 21, 1981. The venue for the summit meetings was the Château Montebello.

The Group of Seven (G7) was an unofficial forum which brought together the heads of the richest industrialized countries: France, West Germany, Italy, Japan, the United Kingdom, the United States, Canada (since 1976), and the President of the European Commission (starting officially in 1981). The summits were not meant to be linked formally with wider international institutions; and in fact, a mild rebellion against the stiff formality of other international meetings was a part of the genesis of cooperation between France's president Valéry Giscard d'Estaing and West Germany's chancellor Helmut Schmidt as they conceived the first Group of Six (G6) summit in 1975.

== Leaders at the summit ==
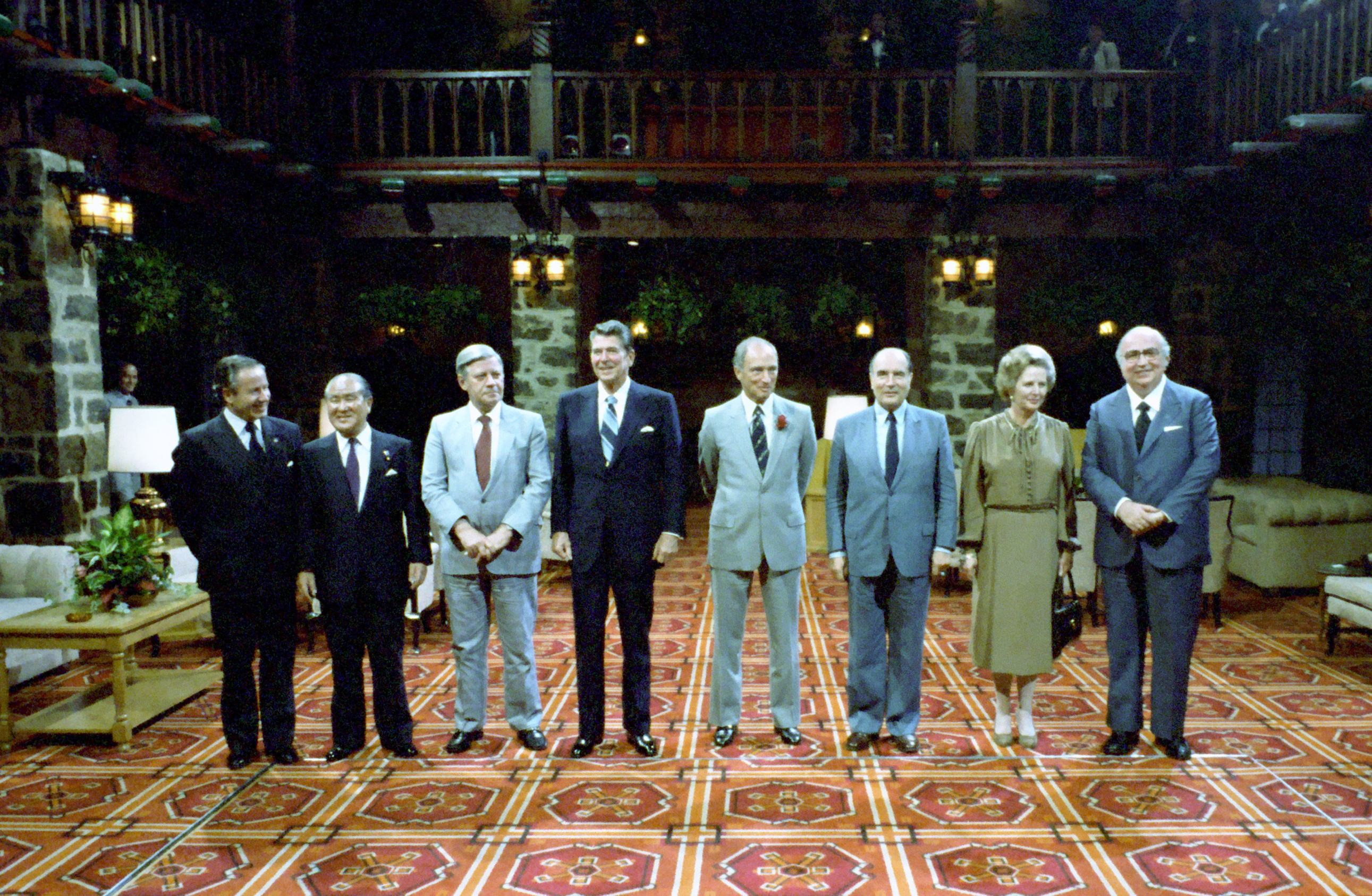
Summit leaders at the Château Montebello (left to right): Gaston Thorn, Zenko Suzuki, Helmut Schmidt, Ronald Reagan, Pierre Trudeau, François Mitterrand, Margaret Thatcher, and Giovanni Spadolini

The G7 is an unofficial annual forum for the leaders of Canada, the European Commission, France, Germany, Italy, Japan, the United Kingdom, and the United States.

The 7th G7 summit was the first summit for French President François Mitterrand, Italian Prime Minister Giovanni Spadolini, Japanese Prime Minister Zenko Suzuki, and US President Ronald Reagan.

=== Participants ===
These summit participants are the current "core members" of the international forum:

**Core G7 members** Host state and leader are shown in bold text.
| Member | | Represented by | Title |
| (Canada) | **Canada** | **Pierre Trudeau** | **Prime Minister** |
| (France) | France | François Mitterrand | President |
| (West Germany) | West Germany | Helmut Schmidt | Chancellor |
| (Italy) | Italy | Giovanni Spadolini | Prime Minister |
| (Japan) | Japan | Zenkō Suzuki | Prime Minister |
| (United Kingdom) | United Kingdom | Margaret Thatcher | Prime Minister |
| (United States) | United States | Ronald Reagan | President |
| (European Union) | European Community | Gaston Thorn | Commission President |
| (European Union) | European Community | Margaret Thatcher | Council President |

== Issues ==
The summit was intended as a venue for resolving differences among its members. As a practical matter, the summit was also conceived as an opportunity for its members to give each other mutual encouragement in the face of difficult economic decisions.

== Gallery of participating leaders ==
=== Core G7 participants ===
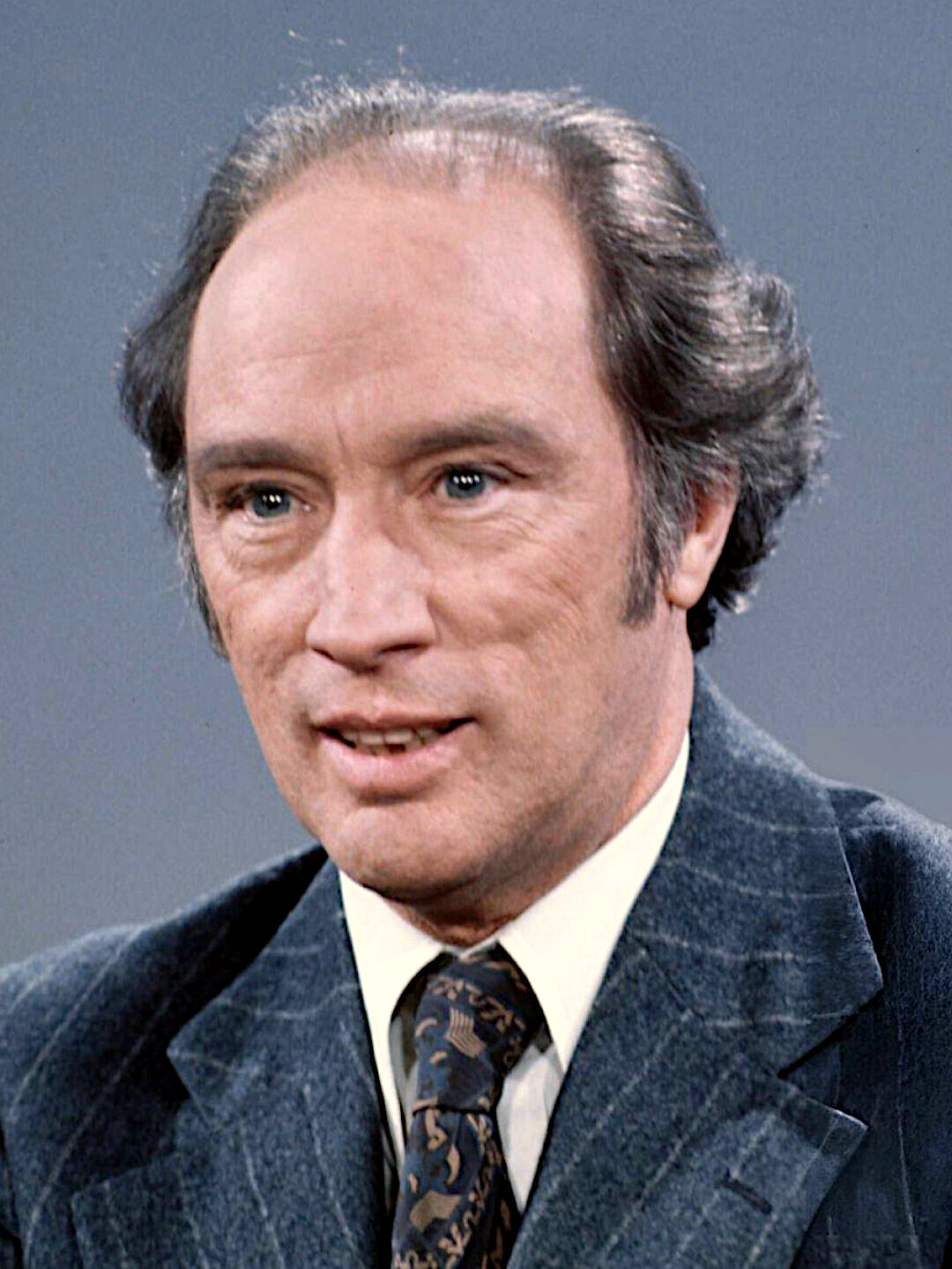
(Canada) Canada
Pierre Trudeau,
Prime Minister (Host)

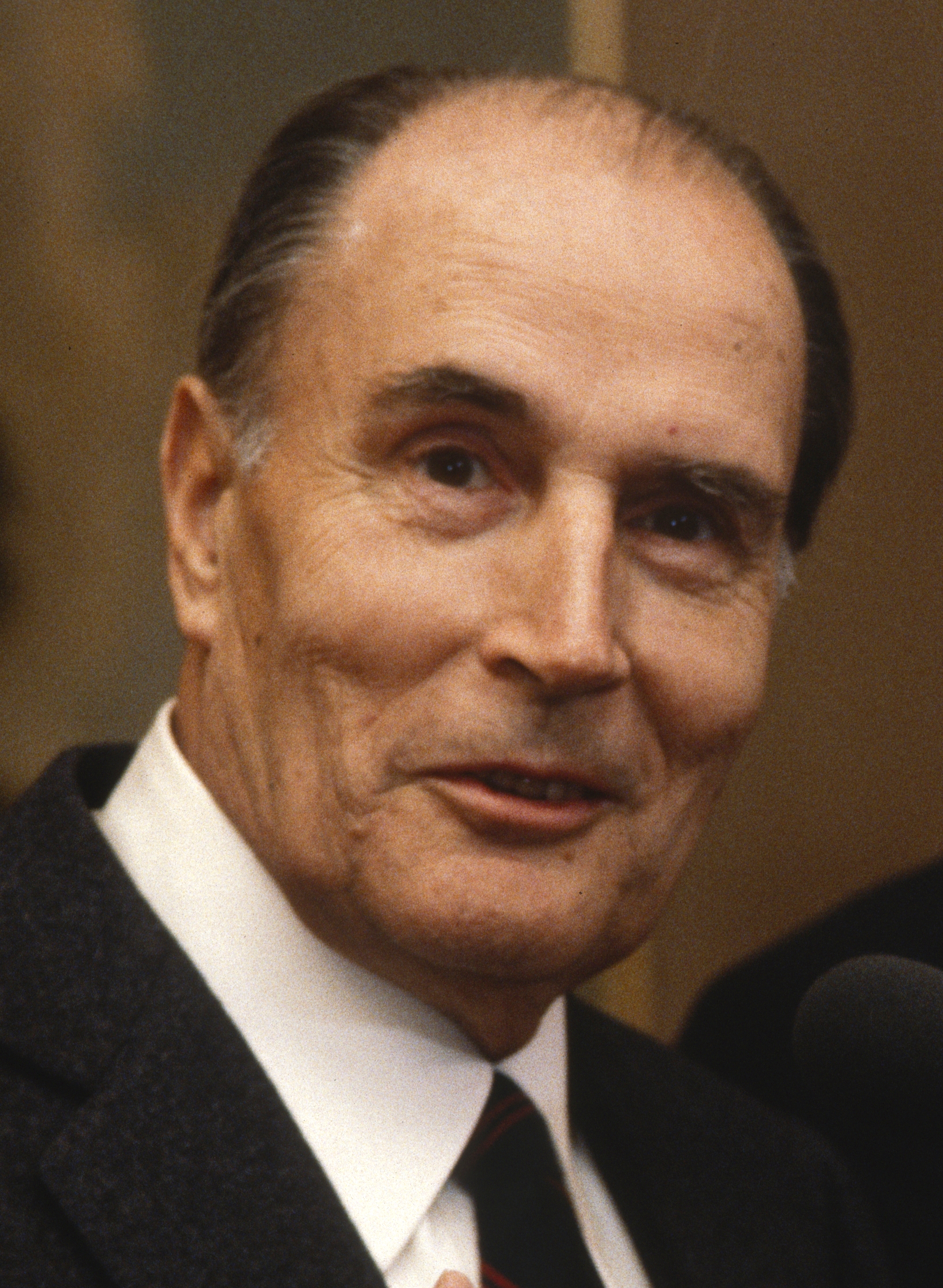
(France) France
François Mitterrand,
President

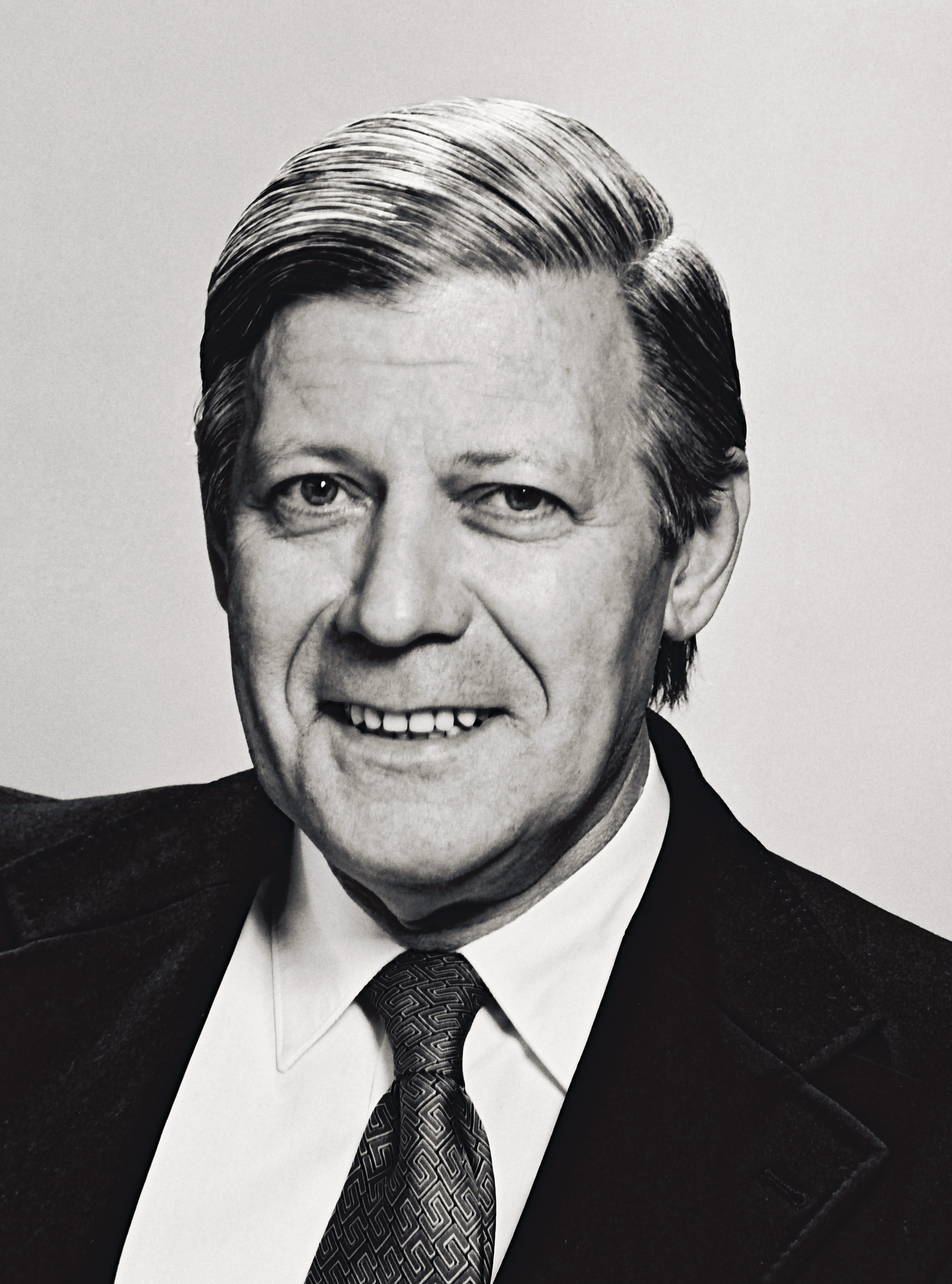
(Germany) Germany
Helmut Schmidt,
Chancellor

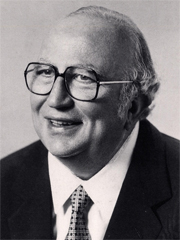
(Italy) Italy
Giovanni Spadolini,
Prime Minister

(Japan) Japan
Zenkō Suzuki,
Prime Minister

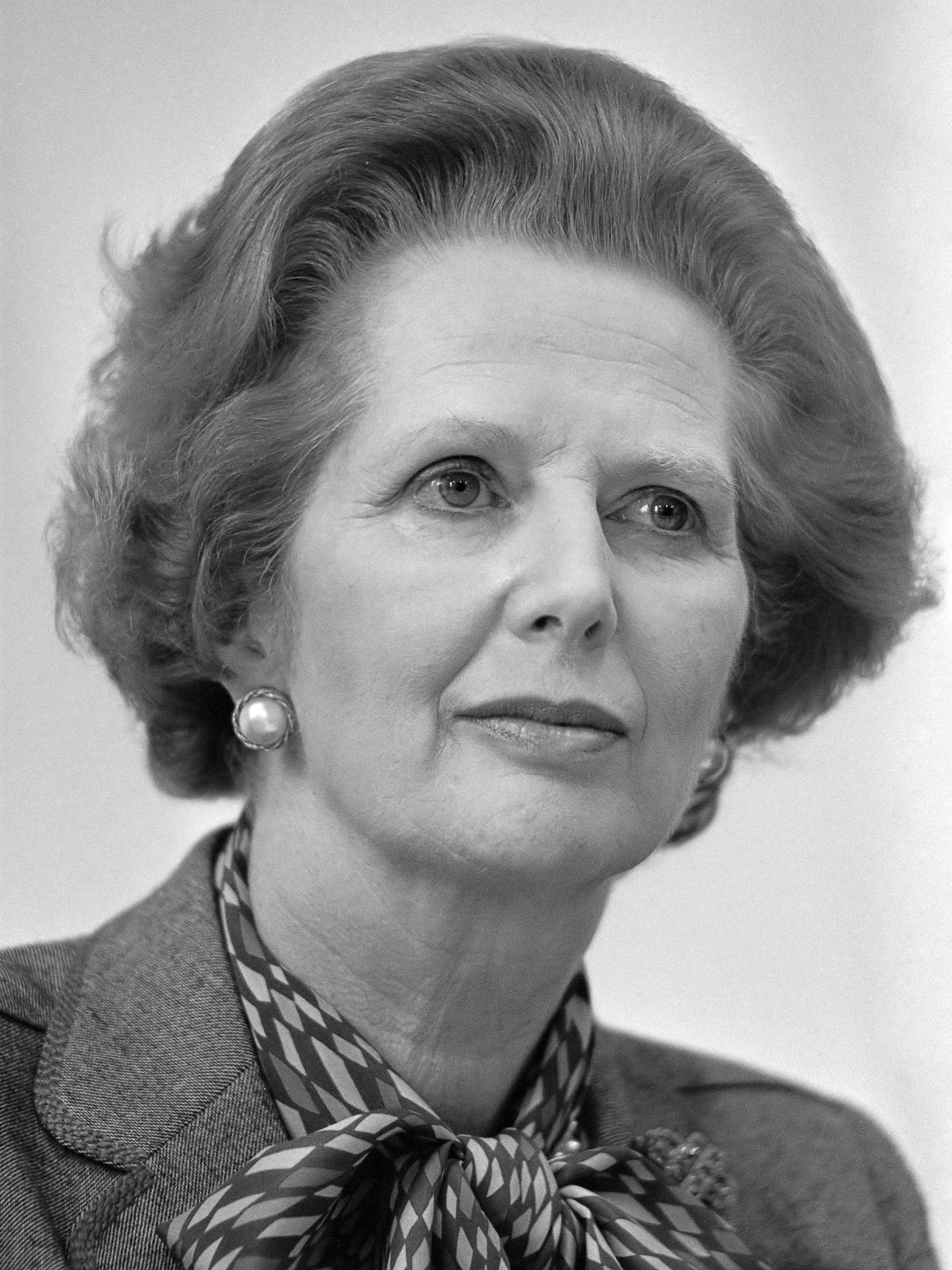
(United Kingdom) United Kingdom
Margaret Thatcher,
Prime Minister

(United States) United States
Ronald Reagan,
President
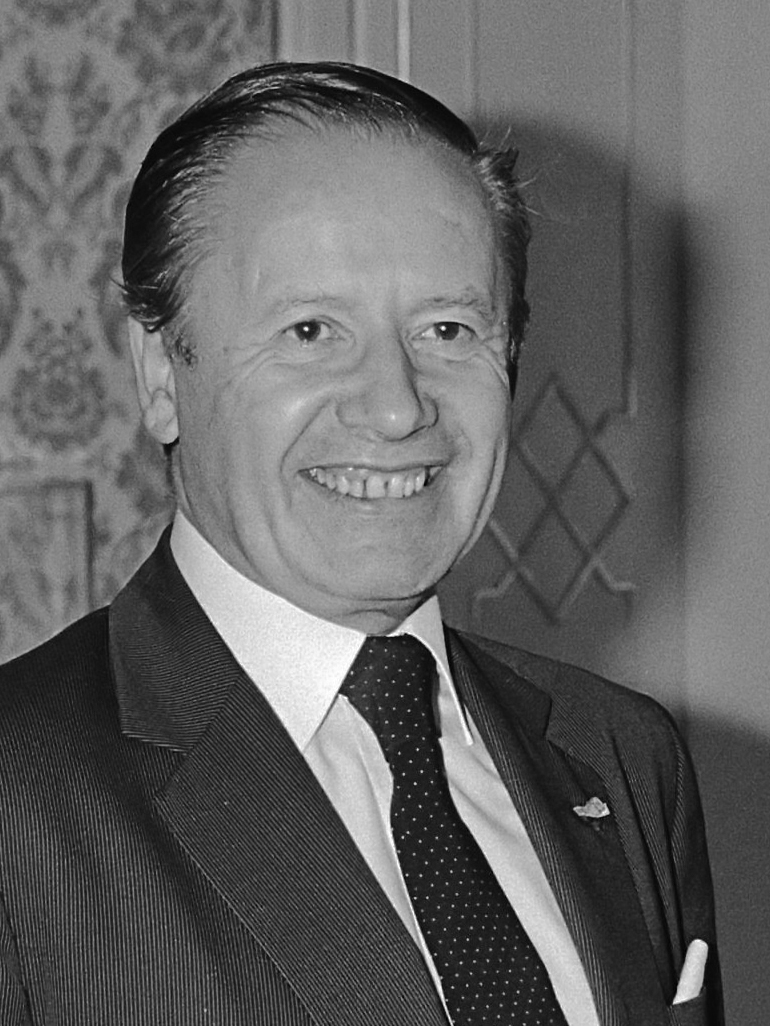
(European Union) European Commission
Gaston Thorn,
President

== See also ==
- G8
