= Parc Omega =

Safari park in Quebec, Canada

Coordinates: 45°40′57″N 74°56′38″W

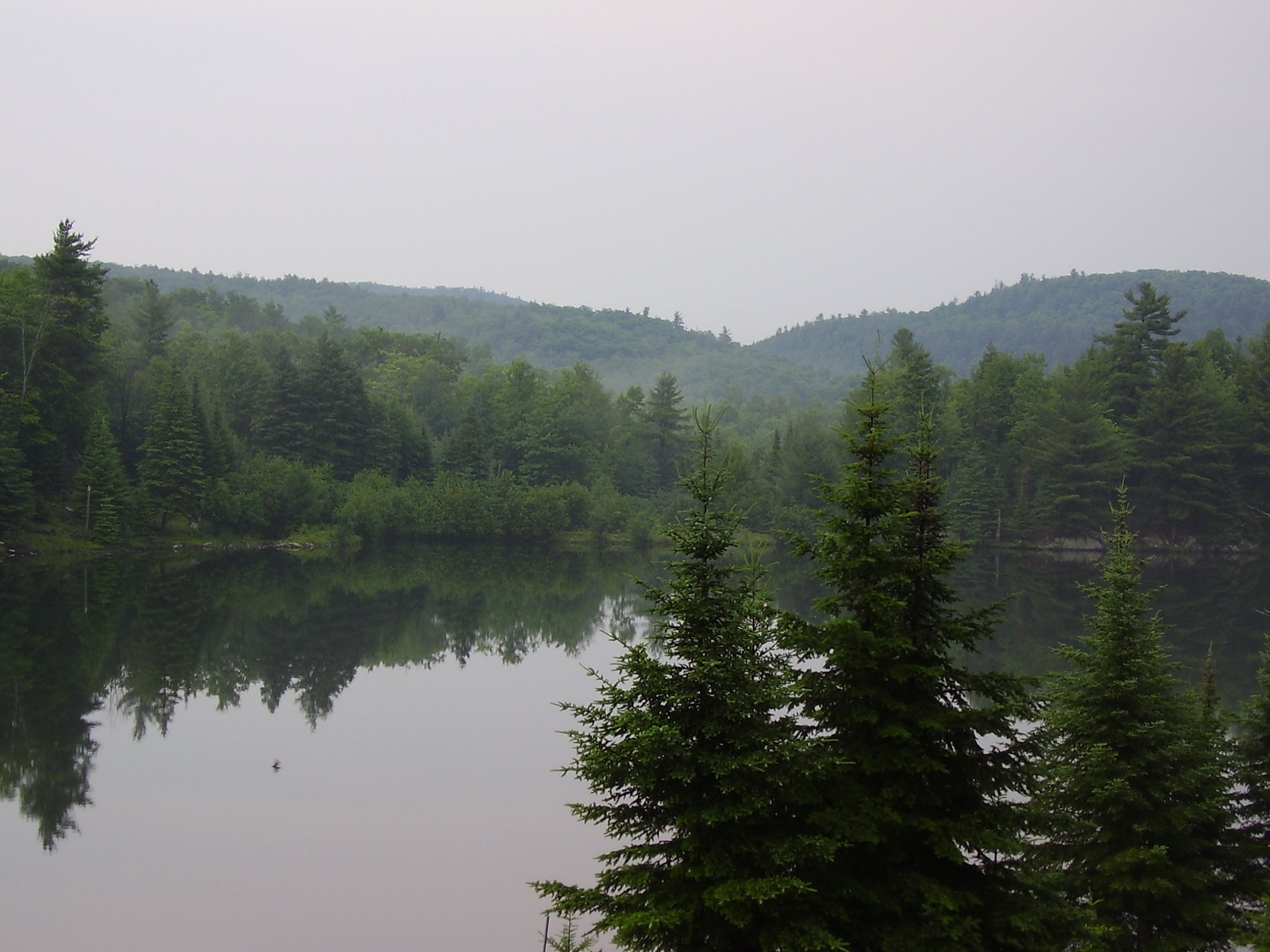
- Scenic view in Parc Omega
- Interactive map of Parc Omega
- Location: Notre-Dame-de-Bonsecours, Quebec, Canada (just north of Montebello)
- Website: https://www.parcomega.ca/

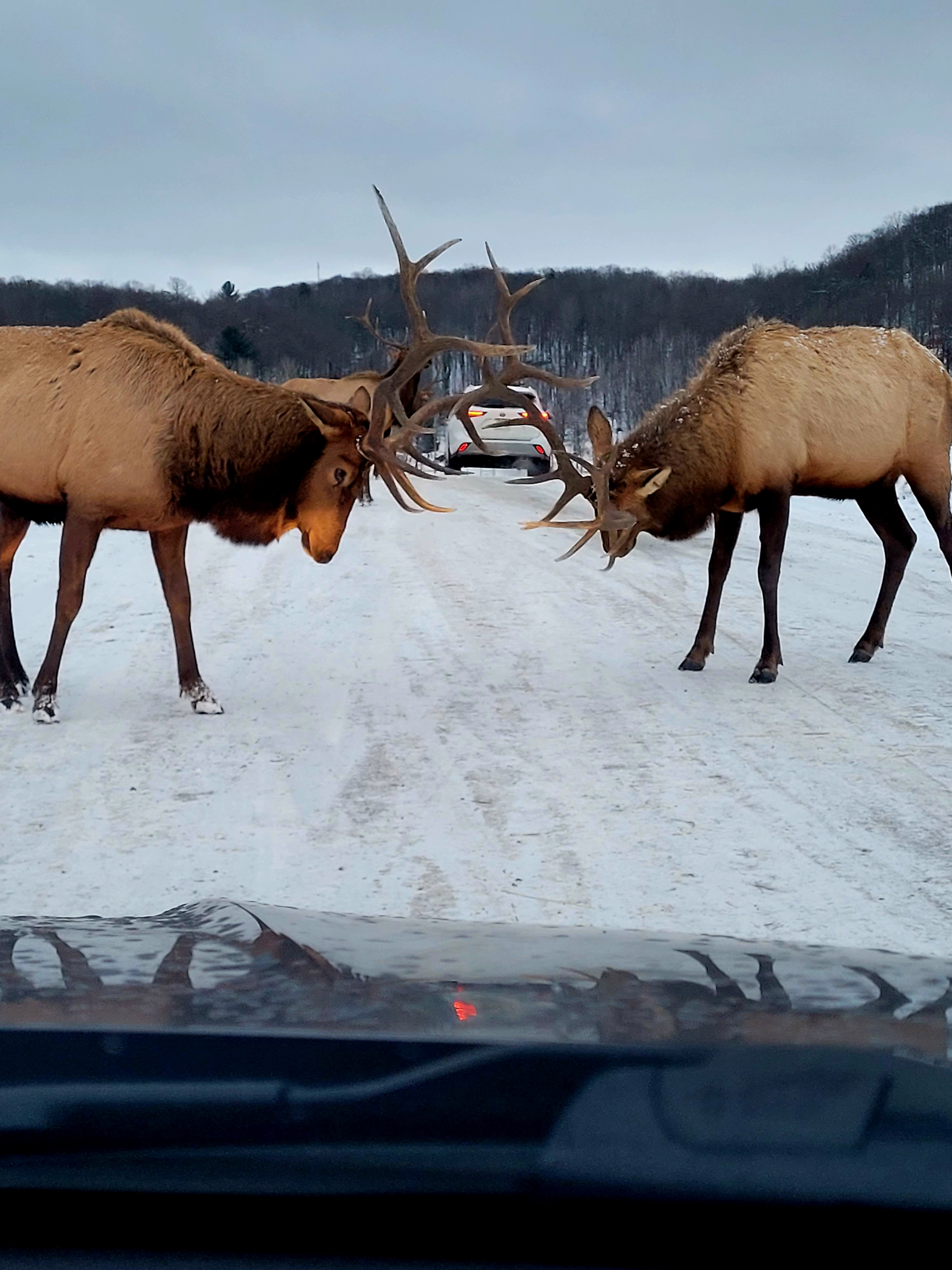
Two elk

Parc Omega is a safari park in Notre-Dame-de-Bonsecours, Quebec, Canada, just north of Montebello. It is located about 70 km from Gatineau and about 110 km from Montreal. Along a 12-kilometre (7.5 mi) nature route are lakes, meadows, small valleys, forests, and rocky hills.

== History ==
Parc Omega opened in 1991.

In 1996, Olivier Favre, a businessman from the Alsace region of France became co-owner of the park. In 2001, he became the sole owner.

In 2019, roughly 280,000 visitors came to the site each year.

== Description ==
Parc Omega is home to wildlife species including beaver, elk, raccoon, grey wolf, coyote, muskox, whitetail deer, mule deer, yellow bellied marmot, turtle, boar, red fox, Alpine ibex, caribou, black bear, wolverine, moose, wild turkey, cougar, Canadian lynx, bobcat, eastern mole, American badger, American antelope and bison.

The park is a drive-through experience, meaning visitors stay in their cars and drive slowly through the park on a winding trail. They also offer three walking trails, playgrounds and picnic areas. The park runs two low-power FM radios stations that provide information and directions, in both English and French. The complete experience takes about two to three hours.

Bags of carrots can be purchased at the visitors center at the start of the tour or visitors can bring their own. These can be fed to "safe" animals such as elk and deer, which often approach cars throughout the drive looking for food.

During the summer there are shows featuring birds of prey especially bald eagles. The site also has a restaurant with a view of a lake, a gift shop with Indigenous crafts, a woodstove-heated yurt, and a small outdoor stage for performances. The park is open daily, year round.

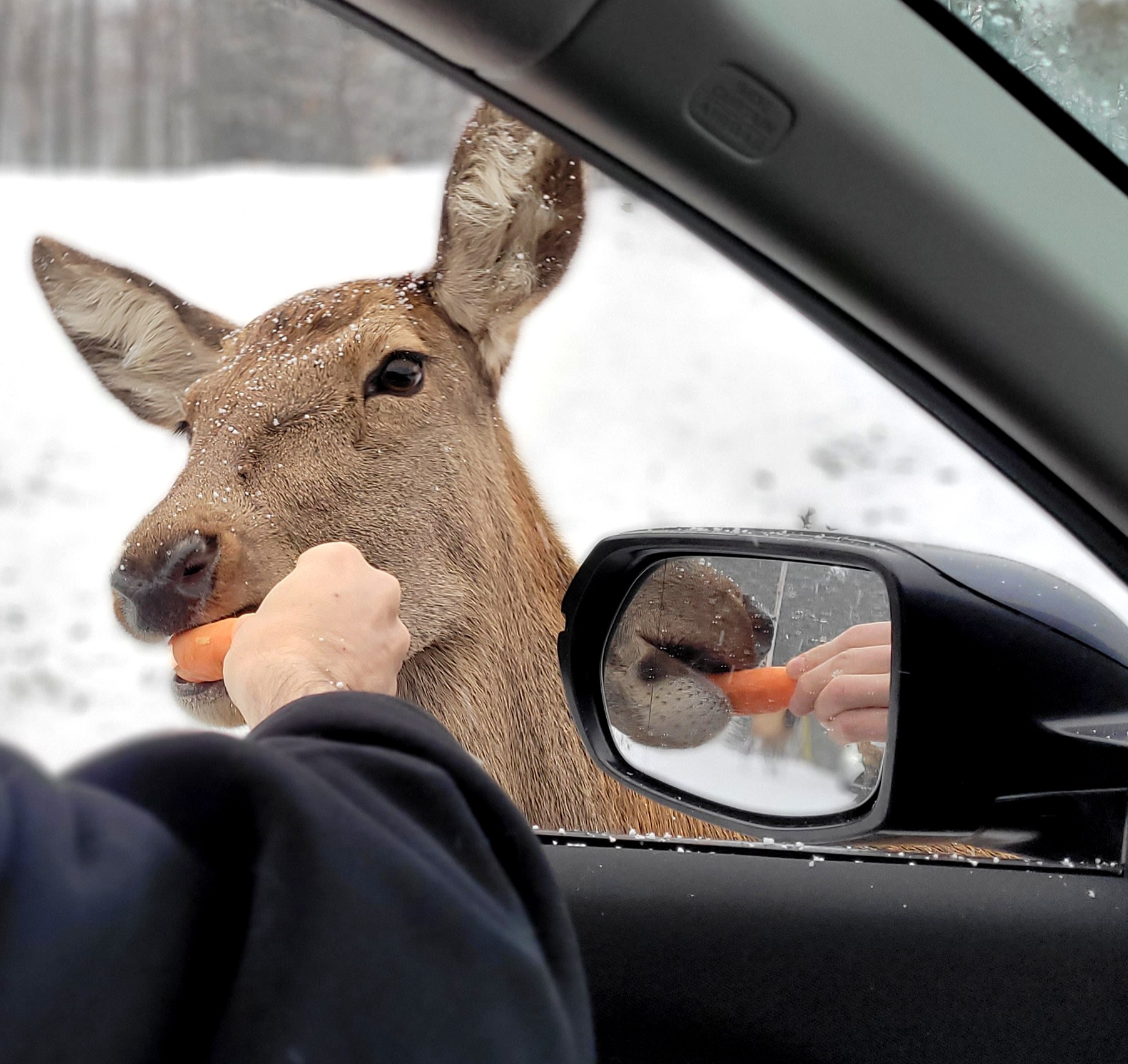
A wapiti (elk) eats carrots from a visitor.
