= Laura Mae Corrigan =

American socialite and philanthropist

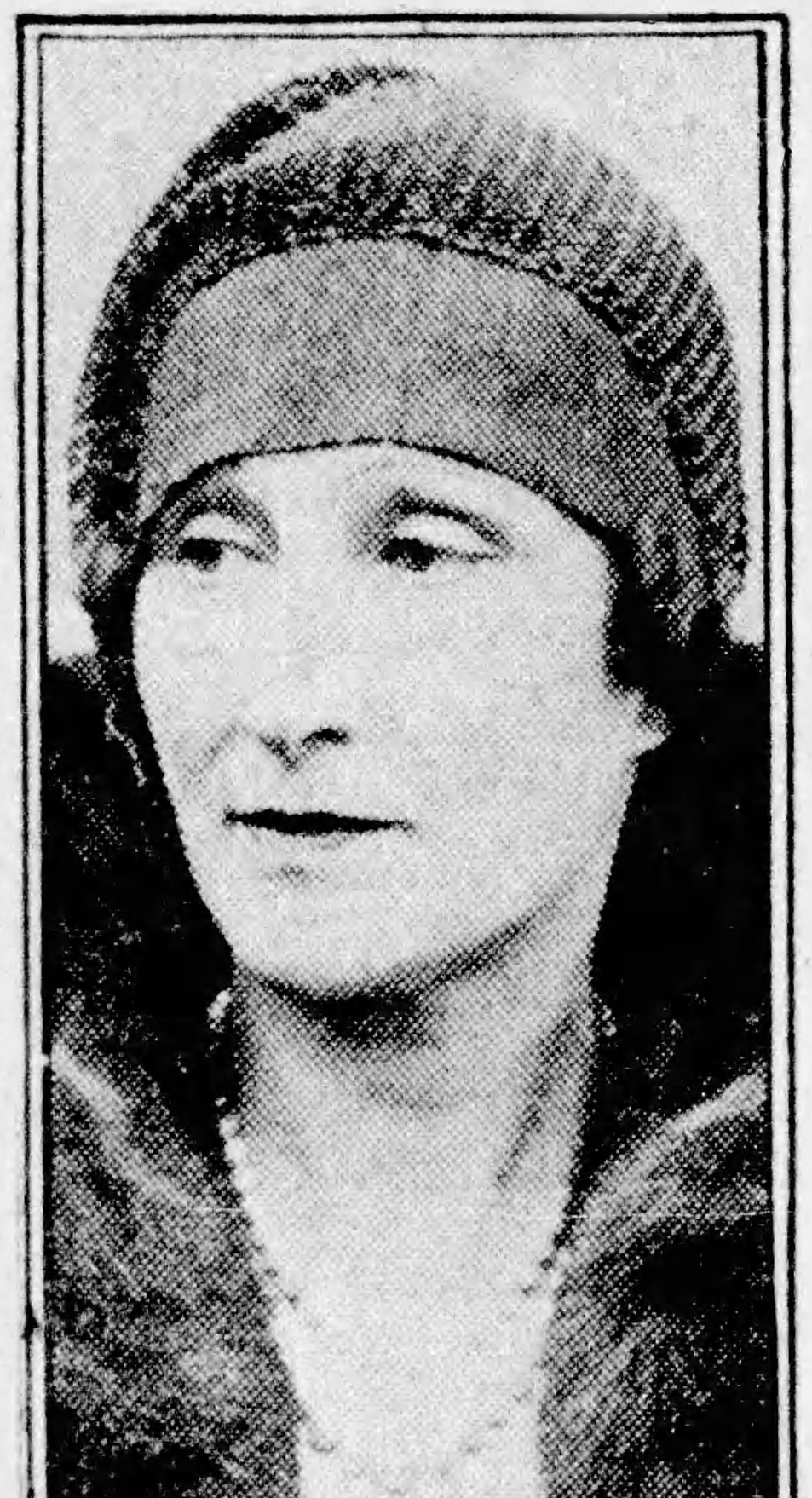
Laura Mae Corrigan in March 1930

Laura Mae Corrigan (2 January 1879 – 22 January 1948) was a wealthy American socialite and philanthropist. Her actions during the Second World War in supporting Allied troops and aiding refugees from Nazi-occupied Europe led to her being awarded the Croix de Guerre, Legion of Honour, Croix du Combattant, and the King's Medal for Service in the Cause of Freedom.

== Marriage & social prominence ==
Corrigan was born in Wisconsin in 1879 to Charles and Emma Whitlock. She first married a Chicago doctor named Duncan R. MacMartin, whom she met while working as a waitress. She later divorced MacMartin and on December 2, 1916, remarried James W. Corrigan, the son of one of the founders of the Corrigan-McKinney Steel Co. of Cleveland, Ohio. The newlyweds were snubbed by Cleveland and New York society because of Laura's humble background and her record as a divorcée, so in 1919 they relocated to London. The Corrigans befriended Alice Keppel and rented her house on Grosvenor Street in Mayfair. In time Mrs. Corrigan gained a reputation for her lavish parties, joining the ranks of other prominent society hostesses of American origin like Emerald Cunard, Elsa Maxwell, and Nancy Astor. Although overall she was a great success, she still encountered prejudice because of her humble background (her rival Mrs. Ronnie Greville complained that she was "never hungry enough" to dine with Mrs. Corrigan).

In 1925 her husband returned to Cleveland to take up management of his father's company. Mrs. Corrigan remained in Europe and upon James's death in 1928, inherited his shares in Corrigan-McKinney, which she eventually sold to Republic Steel for $21 million. The income she received from her investments amounted to $800,000 per annum on the eve of the Second World War. Ulf Aschan wrote, likely citing Elspeth Huxley's earlier (1985) description of Corrigan, in reference to her impact on the British East Africa community in Babati, "Famous for her wealth-which was derived from her husband's steel mills-and her lavish entertainment in a bid to ensnare the rich and titled, Laura also looked after her poorer, albeit titled, friends to uphold standards at all costs." Her reputation in London suffered in the late 1930s as a result of the Edward VIII abdication crisis, due to her association with Wallis Simpson.

Amongst her philanthropic activities, Corrigan supported the Cleveland Zoo and in 1933 made a gift of 28 animals she had obtained on safari in Africa, which became the highlight of the Zoo's collection during the 1930s. Corrigan also donated $5,000 to fund 4 years worth of food for the animals, since the Zoo was unable to afford their upkeep. That same year she donated $10,000 to a range of causes in her native Wisconsin, including the Wisconsin Rapids Unemployment Relief Fund, Riverview Hospital Association, and the South Wood County chapter of the Red Cross.

== World War II ==
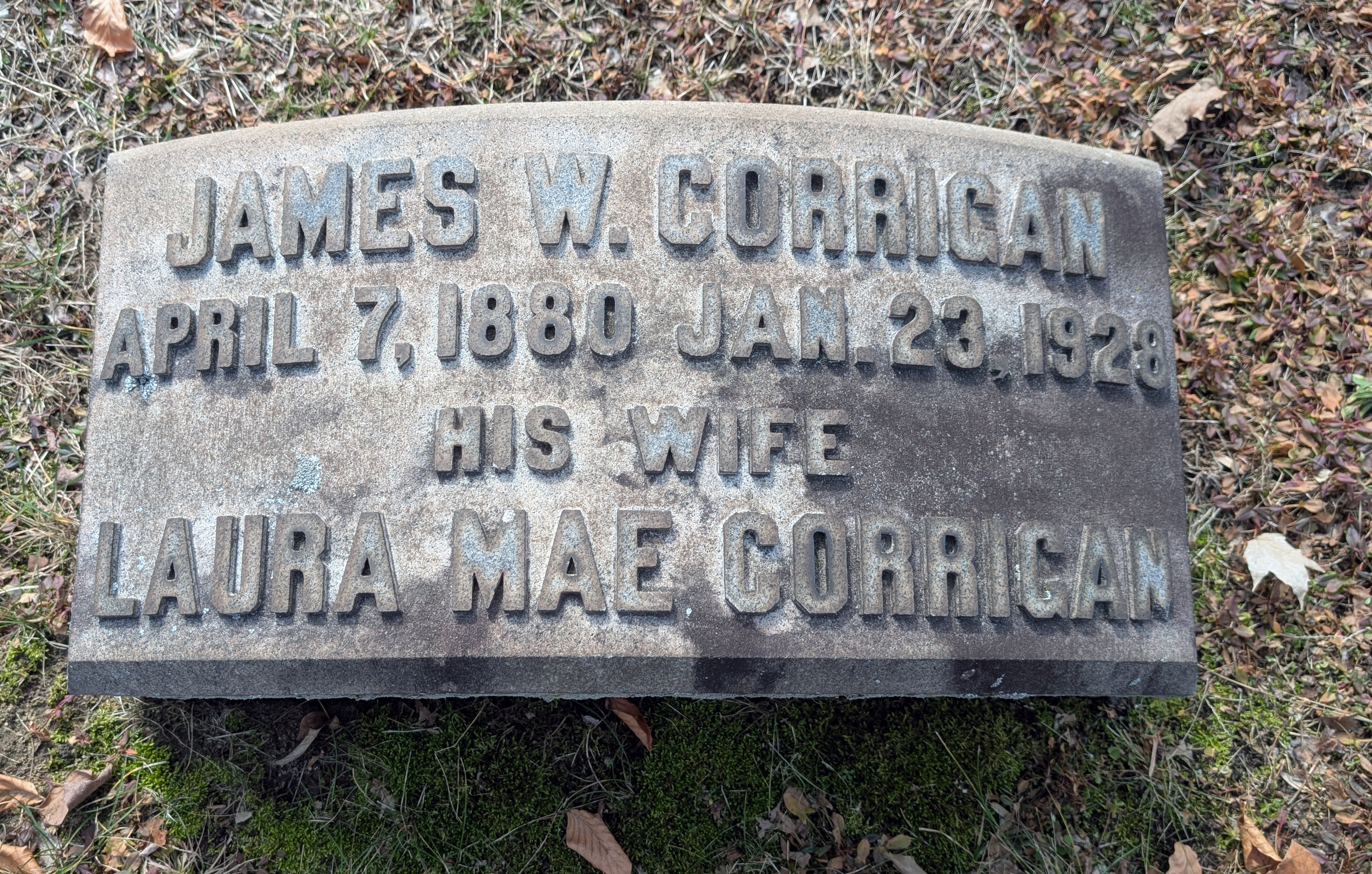
Grave of Laura Mae Corrigan at Lake View Cemetery in Cleveland, Ohio, US

When war broke out between France and Germany in September 1939, Corrigan chose to remain in Paris as a neutral American citizen at the Ritz Hotel, where she had long maintained a suite. She founded an aid group for Allied servicemen called "La Bienvenue" and cultivated high-ranking Nazi officials in Paris, including Hermann Goering. After France was invaded by Germany in 1940, Corrigan moved to the unoccupied Vichy, where she became known as the "American Angel" for helping to fund the French Resistance and aid refugees. Her income was reduced to only $500 a month by the State Department as part of wartime controls on the movement of money overseas, so she sold her furniture, jewelry, and other valuables in order to continue funding her refugee and resistance activities. In 1942 she escaped to England via Portugal, and devoted herself to organizing relief for French refugees and soldiers. She ran a popular club for airmen called the Wing's Club near RAF Wing in Buckinghamshire. In recognition of her heroism, she was awarded the Croix de Guerre, the Legion of Honor and Croix du Combattant by the postwar French Republic, as well as the King's Medal for Service in the Cause of Freedom from the British government.

== Death ==
Corrigan died on January 22, 1948, while she was in New York City visiting her sister. She was buried with her husband in Cleveland's Lake View Cemetery.
