= Montebello, Quebec =

Montebello
- Municipality
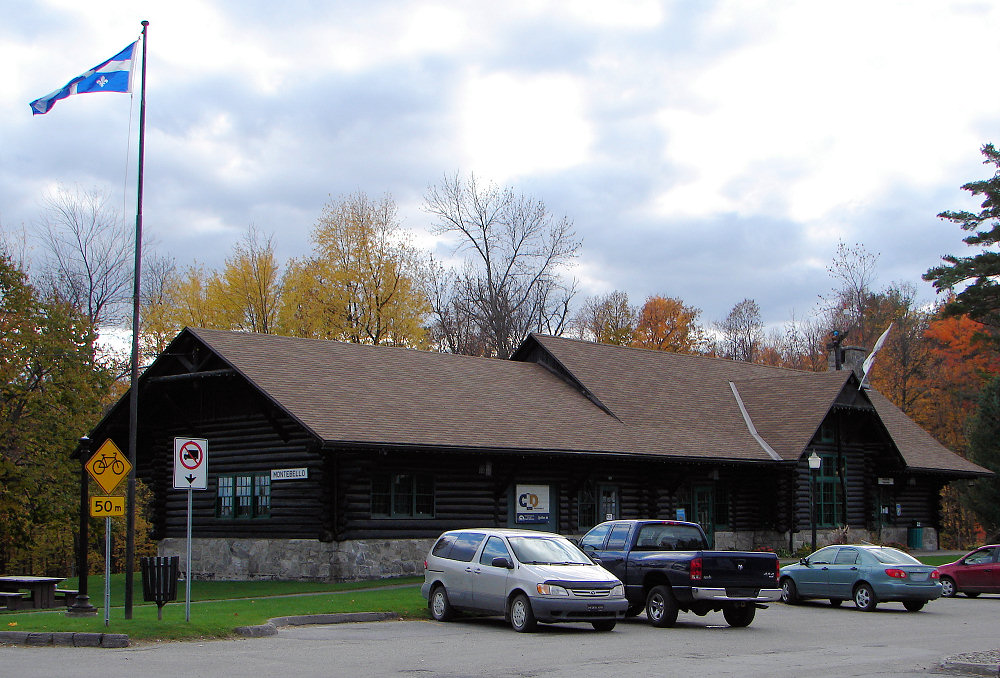
- Local development centre in Montebello, in the former Canadian Pacific Railway Depot

- Coat of arms

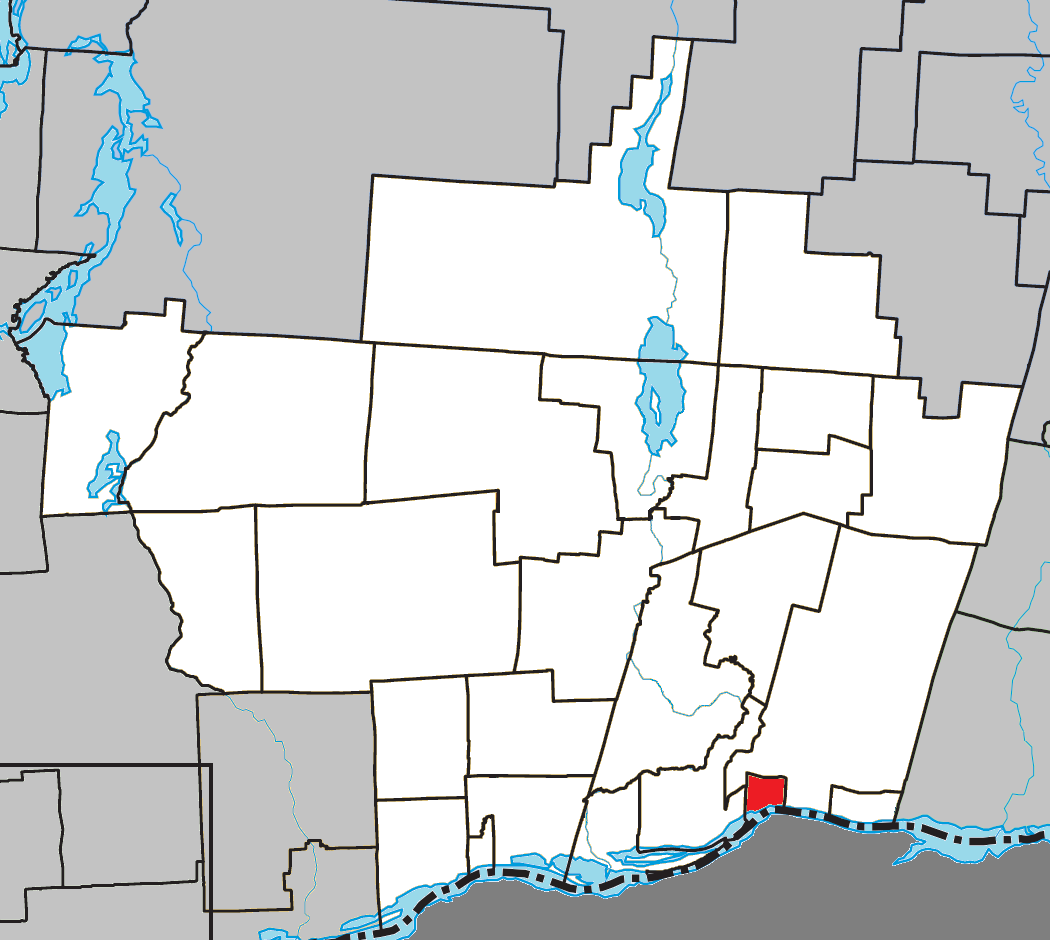
- Location within Papineau RCM

- Location in western Quebec
- Coordinates: 45°39′N 74°56′W
- Country: Canada
- Province: Quebec
- Region: Outaouais
- RCM: Papineau
- Constituted: August 29, 1885

Government
  - Mayor: Wesley Fairchild
  - Federal riding: Argenteuil—La Petite-Nation
  - Prov. riding: Papineau

Area
  - Total: 10.50 km^{2} (4.05 sq mi)
  - Land: 8.62 km^{2} (3.33 sq mi)

Population (2021)
  - Total: 934
  - Density: 114/km^{2} (300/sq mi)
  - Pop 2016-2021: ▲ - 5%
  - Dwellings: 505
- Time zone: UTC−5 (EST)
  - Summer (DST): UTC−4 (EDT)
- Postal code(s): J0V 1L0
- Area code: 819
- Highways: R-148; R-323
- Website: www.montebello.ca

Montebello (French pronunciation: [mɔ̃tebɛlo]) is a municipality located in the Papineau Regional County Municipality of Western Quebec, Canada. At the 2021 census, there were 934 permanent residents. The village has a total area of 7.95 square kilometres (3.07 sq mi), and is located at the eastern edge of Quebec's Outaouais region. It is located on the border with Ontario. The town is listed as a Village rélais.

The village is the location of the Château Montebello resort, the largest log structure ever built. The resort was the host of the 1983 NATO Nuclear Planning Group, and the 1981 G7 Economic Summit.

Parc Omega, a large drive-through wildlife park, is just to the north in Notre-Dame-de-Bonsecours.

From 2005 to 2019, the village hosted the Amnesia Rockfest, which had become Canada's largest rock festival. Past performers included System of a Down, Blink-182, Alice Cooper, The Offspring, Korn, Marilyn Manson, Linkin Park, Rise Against and Dream Theater.

== History ==
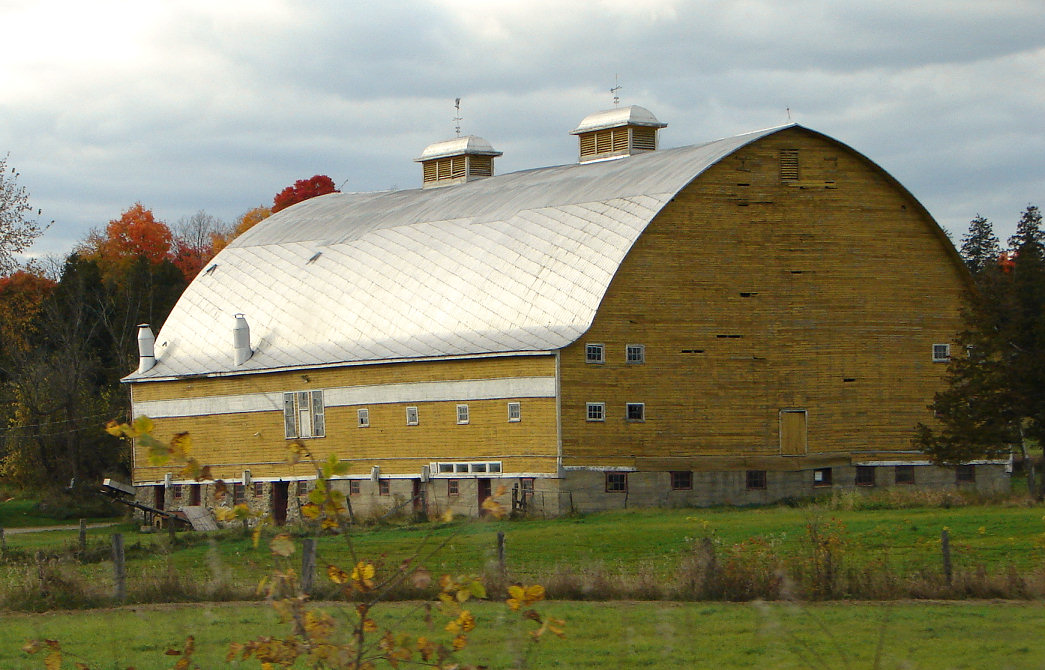
Scenic barn in Montebello

Non-native settlement of the area began when the land of the Petite Nation Seigneury was purchased by Joseph Papineau in 1801. Later in 1817, Louis-Joseph Papineau inherited the property and starting in 1846, built the Manor of Montebello, which is now a National Historic Site in the national park system, operated by Parks Canada. The Family Museum, (c. 1880) which is on the national Register of Historic Places, is next to Manoir Papineau, on the grounds of the National Historic Site.

Louis-Joseph is credited with giving the name "Monte-Bello" to the location in 1854 as tribute to Louis Napoleon Lannes, Duke of Montebello (1801-1874), French diplomat and foreign minister in 1839, with whom he had become acquainted during his exile in France from 1839 to 1845.

In 1855, the village got its post office. In 1878, it separated from the Parish Municipality of Notre-Dame-de-Bon-Secours-de-la-Petite-Nation and formed the Village Municipality of Montebello. On August 2, 2003, its status was changed and it became the Municipality of Montebello.

On August 20–21, 2007, the President of the United States (George W. Bush), the Prime Minister of Canada (Stephen Harper), and the President of Mexico (Felipe Calderón) held a major trilateral summit meeting, in relation to the Security and Prosperity Partnership of North America, at the Château Montebello. A diverse group numbering more than 1,200 protestors opposed the SPP meeting. The group included labour unions, environmental activists, political parties and NGOs.

== Demographics ==
Canada census – Montebello community profile

	2021	2016	2011
Population	934 (-5.0% from 2016)	983 (0.5% from 2011)	978 (-0.9% from 2006)
Land area	8.60 km^{2} (3.32 sq mi)	8.62 km^{2} (3.33 sq mi)	8.36 km^{2} (3.23 sq mi)
Population density	108.7/km^{2} (282/sq mi)	114.0/km^{2} (295/sq mi)	117.0/km^{2} (303/sq mi)
Median age	54.4 (M: 54.8, F: 54.0)	52.6 (M: 53.4, F: 51.7)	51.2 (M: 51.7, F: 50.4)
Private dwellings	517 (total) 459 (occupied)	505 (total)	527 (total)
Median household income	$58,800	$52,480	$40,851

References: 2021 2016 2011

Historical census populations – Montebello, Quebec
Year	Pop.	±%
1986	1,069	—
1991	1,022	−4.4%
1996	1,066	+4.3%
2001	1,039	−2.5%
2006	987	−5.0%
2011	978	−0.9%
2016	983	+0.5%
Source: Statistics Canada

Mother tongue:

- English as first language: 5.6%
- French as first language: 89.8%
- English and French as first language: 2.0%
- Other as first language: 2.0%

== Local government ==
List of former mayors:

- Henri Bourassa (1890–1894)
- Jean-Paul Descoeurs (2001–2009)
- Pierre Bertrand (2009–2013)
- Luc Ménard (2013-2017)
- Wesley Fairchild (2017–present)
