= 2013 Boucherville municipal election =

Boucherville Municipal Election in 2017

← 2009	3 November 2013	2017 →
	Majority party	Minority party
Leader	Jean Martel	Independent
Party	Équipe Jean Martel Option Citoyens Citoyennes	Independent
Percentage	81.85% (Mayoral) 74.99% (Councillor)	18.15% (Mayoral) 25.01% (Councillor)

The 2013 Boucherville municipal election was an election that was held on the 3rd of November 2013 to elect Boucherville's mayor and eight councillors.

Jean Martel and his party's eight candidates were elected. The voter turnout was 53.4%.

The election results were made available on the website of Québec's Ministry of Municipal Affairs and Housing.

== Election results ==
=== Mayor ===
Party	Mayoral candidate	Vote
Équipe Jean Martel - Option Citoyens Citoyennes	Jean Martel (Inc.)	13,766
Independent	Francine Crevier Bélair	3,052
Total of all valid votes		16,818

=== District 1 (Marie-Victorin) Councillor ===
Party	Mayoral candidate	Vote
Équipe Jean Martel - Option Citoyens Citoyennes	Yan S. Laquerre (Inc.)	1,954
Independent	Monique Reeves	221
Independent	Simon Collette	207

=== District 2 (Rivière-aux-Pins) Councillor ===
Party	Mayoral candidate	Vote
Équipe Jean Martel - Option Citoyens Citoyennes	Raouf Absi (Inc.)	1,541
Independent	Michaël Léveillée	781

=== District 3 (Des Découvreurs) Councillor ===
Party	Mayoral candidate	Vote
Équipe Jean Martel - Option Citoyens Citoyennes	Alexandra Capone (Inc.)	1,704
Independent	Marc Lapointe	500

=== District 4 (Harmonie) Councillor ===
Party	Mayoral candidate	Vote
Équipe Jean Martel - Option Citoyens Citoyennes	Anne Barabé (Inc.)	1,556
Independent	Carl Chevalier	728

=== District 5 (La Seigneurie) Councillor ===
Party	Mayoral candidate	Vote
Équipe Jean Martel - Option Citoyens Citoyennes	Dominic Lévesque (Inc.)	1,479
Independent	Michel Dufresne	371

=== District 6 (Saint-Louis) Councillor ===
Party	Mayoral candidate	Vote
Équipe Jean Martel - Option Citoyens Citoyennes	Magalie Queval (Inc.)	1,600
Independent	Julie Naud	513

=== District 7 (De Normandie) Councillor ===
Party	Mayoral candidate	Vote
Équipe Jean Martel - Option Citoyens Citoyennes	Jacqueline Boubane (Inc.)	1,554
Independent	Francine Guidi	506

=== District 8 (Du Boisé) Councillor ===
Party	Mayoral candidate	Vote
Équipe Jean Martel - Option Citoyens Citoyennes	Lise Roy (Inc.)	1,239
Independent	Jacques Larose	384
