= 2017 Quebec municipal elections =

- November 5, 2017

The Canadian province of Quebec held municipal elections in its municipalities on November 5, 2017.

Results by region:

Note: (X) refers to being an incumbent

== Bas-Saint-Laurent ==
=== Amqui ===
Mayoral candidate	Vote	%
Pierre D’Amours (X)	1,843	78.53
Jocelyn Couturier	504	21.47

=== La Pocatière ===
Mayoral candidate	Vote	%
Sylvain Hudon (X)	1,003	66.96
Luc Pelletier	495	33.04

=== Matane ===
Mayoral candidate	Vote	%
Jérôme Landry (X)	3,251	65.97
Jean-Claude Harrison	1,677	34.03

=== Mont-Joli ===
Mayoral candidate	Vote	%
Martin Soucy	1,762	72.18
Kédina Fleury-Samson	679	27.82

=== Rimouski ===
==== Mayor ====
Mayoral candidate	Vote	%
Marc Parent (X)	7,860	47.43
Pierre Chassé	5,615	33.88
Gilles Gaston Thériault	1,571	9.48
Djanick Michaud	1,525	9.20

==== Rimouski City Council ====
Candidate	Vote	%
Sacré-Coeur District (1)
Sébastien Bolduc	915	47.07
Serge Dionne (X)	740	38.08
Hélène Boutin	289	14.87
Nazareth District (2)
Rodrigue Joncas (X)	957	64.97
Daniel Paré	516	35.03
Saint-Germain District (3)
Jennifer Murray (X)	823	66.48
Raynald Caissy	249	20.11
Bill Gleeson	166	13.41
Rimouski-Est District (4)
Cécilia Michaud (X)	Acclaimed	
Pointe-au-Père District (5)
Jacques Lévesque (X)	Acclaimed	
Sainte-Odile District (6)
Grégory Thorez	902	50.93
Pierre Côte	869	49.07
Saint-Robert District (7)
Jocelyn Pelletier	1,106	80.44
Dany Bouffard	269	19.56
Terrasse Arthur-Buies District (8)
Karol Francis (X)	1,271	66.13
Cédric Bouillon	439	22.84
Sylvain Canuel	212	11.03
Saint-Pie-X District (9)
Simon St-Pierre	1,397	81.17
Martin St-Pierre Deschenes	324	18.83
Sainte-Blandine et Mont-Lebel District (10)
Dave Dumas (X)	742	89.40
Lise Marie Perron	88	10.60
Le Bic District (11)
Virginie Proulx	1,051	78.37
Magella Fortin	290	21.63

=== Rivière-du-Loup ===
Mayoral candidate	Vote	%
Sylvie Vignet	3,396	42.61
Pierre Levesque	3,008	37.74
Gaétan Gamache (X)	1,566	19.65

=== Saint-Épiphane ===
Mayoral candidate	Vote	%
Renald Côté (X)	Acclaimed	

=== Trois-Pistoles ===
Party	Mayoral candidate	Vote	%
Action Trois-Pistoles	Jean Pierre Rioux (X)	1,072	95.80
Independent	Pierre-André Michaud	24	2.14
Independent	Armand Malenfant	23	2.06
Total valid votes		1,119	42.2

== Saguenay–Lac-Saint-Jean ==
=== Alma ===
Mayoral candidate	Vote	%
Marc Asselin (X)	Acclaimed	

=== Dolbeau-Mistassini ===
Mayoral candidate	Vote	%
Pascal Cloutier	2,550	46.08
Claire Néron	1,925	34.78
Françoise Bergeron	1,059	19.14

=== Roberval ===
Mayoral candidate	Vote	%
Sabin Côté	2,513	55.23
Guy Larouche (X)	2,037	44.77

=== Saguenay ===
==== Mayor ====
Party	Mayoral candidate	Vote	%
Équipe du renouveau démocratique	Josée Néron	31,313	49.42
Independent	Jean-Pierre Blackburn	17,209	29.09
Independent	Arthur Gobeil	11,031	17.36
Équipe Dominic Gagnon - Parti des citoyens de Saguenay	Dominic Gagnon	3,896	6.13
Total valid votes		63,529	55.7

==== Saguenay City Council ====
District 1
Party	Council candidate	Vote	%
Independent	Jonathan Tremblay (X)	2,029	44.25
Independent	Sylvain Gaudreault	1,222	26.65
Équipe du renouveau démocratique	Dominique Corneau	849	18.52
Independent	Romain Gagnon	297	6.48
Équipe Dominic Gagnon - Parti des citoyens de Saguenay	Marie-Pier Lemieux	188	4.10
District 2
Party	Council candidate	Vote	%
Independent	Julie Dufour (X)	2,783	64.15
Équipe du renouveau démocratique	Alain Décoste	973	22.43
Équipe Dominic Gagnon - Parti des citoyens de Saguenay	Jean-Pierre Bolduc	582	13.42
District 3
Party	Council candidate	Vote	%
Independent	Michel Thiffault	1,669	44.20
Équipe Dominic Gagnon - Parti des citoyens de Saguenay	Sylvie Gaudreault (X)	1,033	27.36
Équipe du renouveau démocratique	Guy Bouchard	852	22.56
Independent	Jacques Tremblay	222	5.88
District 4
Party	Council candidate	Vote	%
Independent	Kevin Armstrong	1,821	44.84
Équipe Dominic Gagnon - Parti des citoyens de Saguenay	Réjean Hudon (X)	1,178	29.01
Équipe du renouveau démocratique	Christian Simard	1,062	26.15
District 5
Party	Council candidate	Vote	%
Independent	Carl Dufour (X)	4,000	77.34
Équipe du renouveau démocratique	Martine Tremblay	921	17.81
Équipe Dominic Gagnon - Parti des citoyens de Saguenay	Laval Ménard	251	4.85
District 6
Party	Council candidate	Vote	%
Independent	Jean-Marc Crevier	1,972	42.72
Équipe du renouveau démocratique	Magella Archibald	1,114	24.13
Independent	Mélanie Boucher	791	17.14
Independent	Langis McNicoll	494	10.70
Équipe Dominic Gagnon - Parti des citoyens de Saguenay	Michel Mallette	157	3.40
Independent	André Plante	88	1.91
District 7
Party	Council candidate	Vote	%
Independent	Marc Pettersen (X)	2,464	49.56
Équipe du renouveau démocratique	Jean-Yves Desmeules	1,396	28.08
Équipe Dominic Gagnon - Parti des citoyens de Saguenay	Hélène Tremblay	1,112	22.37
District 8
Party	Council candidate	Vote	%
Independent	Simon-Olivier Côté (X)	2,310	55.21
Équipe du renouveau démocratique	Valérie Tremblay	977	23.35
Équipe Dominic Gagnon - Parti des citoyens de Saguenay	Kathleen Boulanger	897	21.44
District 9
Party	Council candidate	Vote	%
Équipe Dominic Gagnon - Parti des citoyens de Saguenay	Michel Tremblay (X)	1,736	41.30
Équipe du renouveau démocratique	Lana Pedneault	1,495	35.57
Independent	Serge Desrosiers	517	12.30
Independent	Mathieu Thibeault	455	10.83
District 10
Party	Council candidate	Vote	%
Équipe du renouveau démocratique	Brigitte Bergeron	2,826	53.22
Équipe Dominic Gagnon - Parti des citoyens de Saguenay	Jacques Cleary (X)	2,020	38.04
Independent	Jean-Marc Hamel	464	8.74
District 11
Party	Council candidate	Vote	%
Équipe du renouveau démocratique	Marc Bouchard	2,837	62.32
Équipe Dominic Gagnon - Parti des citoyens de Saguenay	Guylaine Vézina	1,715	37.68
District 12
Party	Council candidate	Vote	%
Équipe du renouveau démocratique	Michel Potvin	3,126	57.79
Équipe Dominic Gagnon - Parti des citoyens de Saguenay	Luc Blackburn (X)	2,283	42.21
District 13
Party	Council candidate	Vote	%
Independent	Raynald Simard	1,178	57.52
Équipe Dominic Gagnon - Parti des citoyens de Saguenay	Martine Gauthier (X)	551	26.90
Équipe du renouveau démocratique	Owen Desaubin	319	15.58
District 14
Party	Council candidate	Vote	%
Independent	Éric Simard	1,207	45.38
Independent	Louis-Clément Tremblay	760	28.57
Équipe du renouveau démocratique	Hélène Jenkins	693	26.05
District 15
Party	Council candidate	Vote	%
Independent	Martin Harvey	1,183	38.86
Independent	Carolle Dallaire	646	21.22
Équipe Dominic Gagnon - Parti des citoyens de Saguenay	Carol Tremblay	568	18.66
Équipe du renouveau démocratique	Denis Gilbert	431	14.16
Independent	Louise Bouchard	216	7.10

==== By-election ====
A by-election was held in District #1 on December 15, 2019. The results were as follows:

Party	Candidate	Vote	%
Independent	Jimmy Bouchard	571	30.34
Independent	Daniel Tremblay-Larouche	528	28.06
Alliance Saguenay	Dominic Gagnon	402	21.36
Équipe du renouveau démocratique	Gilles Tremblay	206	10.95
Independent	Réjean Hudon	175	9.30
Total valid votes		1,882	

=== Saint-Félicien ===
Mayoral candidate	Vote	%
Luc Gibbons (X)	3,073	66.06
Gilles Potvin	1,305	28.05
Yvon Guay	274	5.89

=== Saint-Honoré ===
Mayoral candidate	Vote	%
Bruno Tremblay (X)	Acclaimed	

== Capitale-Nationale ==
=== Baie-Saint-Paul ===
Mayoral candidate	Vote	%
Jean Fortin (X)	Acclaimed	

=== Boischatel ===
Party	Mayoral candidate	Vote	%
Option Boischatel	Benoit Bouchard	1,705	59.57
Independent	Daniel Leblond	526	18.38
Renouveau Boischatel	Serge Leblanc	352	12.30
Independent	Frédéric Audet	279	9.75

=== Donnacona ===
Mayoral candidate	Vote	%
Jean-Claude Léveillée (X)	1,303	54.36
Marc Hébert	1,094	45.64

=== La Malbaie ===
Mayoral candidate	Vote	%
Michel Couturier (X)	3,499	89.15
Albert Chiasson	426	10.85

=== L'Ancienne-Lorette ===
Party	Mayoral candidate	Vote	%
Équipe Loranger	Émile Loranger (X)	5,709	80.89
Independent	William W. Fortin	1,349	19.11
Total valid votes		7,058	54.6

==== By-election ====
A mayoral by-election was held December 13, 2020 to replace Loranger.

Mayoral candidate	Vote	%
Gaétan Pageau	3,320	55.79
Ginette Nadeau	1,537	25.83
Louis Marie Marcotte	537	9.02
Guillaume Paradis	441	7.41
William W. Fortin	116	1.95

=== Lac-Beauport ===
Party	Mayoral candidate	Vote	%
Équipe Beaulieu - Vision Lac-Beauport	Michel Beaulieu	1,386	41.66
Independent	Pierre Cloutier	764	22.96
Independent	Serge Hamel	593	17.82
Équipe Louise Brunet - Démocratie Lac-Beauport	Louise Brunet (X)	584	17.55

=== Les Éboulements ===
The mayoral campaign in Les Éboulements was noted for the unusual fact that both candidates had the same name, Pierre Tremblay. One was the incumbent mayor of the town, and the other was an incumbent town councillor. The two Pierre Tremblays, who are not related, agreed to include their home addresses in their campaign materials and on the ballot so that voters could distinguish them. The incumbent mayor won re-election.

Mayoral candidate	Vote	%
Pierre Tremblay, Les Éboulements (X)	515	64.38
Pierre Tremblay, St-Joseph-de-la-Rive	285	35.63

=== Pont-Rouge ===
Mayoral candidate	Vote	%
Ghislain Langlais (X)	2,014	65.86
David Montminy	704	23.02
Lise Lachance	340	11.12

=== Portneuf ===
Party	Mayoral candidate	Vote	%
Équipe Mario Alain	Mario Alain	990	68.18
Independent	Anick Leclerc	462	31.82

=== Quebec City ===
==== Mayor ====
Party	Mayoral candidate	Vote	%
Équipe Labeaume	Régis Labeaume (X)	113,760	55.27
Québec 21	Jean-François Gosselin	56,875	27.63
Démocratie Québec	Anne Guérette	30,139	14.64
Option Capitale-Nationale	Nicolas Lavigne-Lefebvre	2,927	1.42
Alliance citoyenne	Daniel Brisson	1,253	0.61
Independent	Claude Gagnon	874	0.42
Total valid votes		205,828	50.89

==== Quebec City Council ====
Cap-aux-Diamants District (1)
Party	Council candidate	Vote	%
Démocratie Québec	Jean Rousseau	3,073	40.69
Équipe Labeaume	Maud Rusk	2,763	36.59
Independent	François Marchand	676	8.95
Québec 21 Équipe JF Gosselin	Christian Lachance	599	7.93
Option Capitale-Nationale	Simon Domingue	293	3.88
Independent	François Talbot	107	1.42
Alliance citoyenne de Québec	Jean Luc Rouckout	41	0.54
Montcalm—Saint-Sacrement District (2)
Party	Council candidate	Vote	%
Independent	Yvon Bussières (X)	4,437	53.16
Démocratie Québec	Christophe Navel	2,831	33.92
Québec 21 Équipe JF Gosselin	Murielle Gagnon	561	6.72
Option Capitale-Nationale	Clovis Brochu	338	4.05
Alliance citoyenne de Québec	Guy Boivin	179	2.14
Saint-Roch—Saint-Sauveur District (3)
Party	Council candidate	Vote	%
Équipe Labeaume	Pierre-Luc Lachance	3,536	46.90
Démocratie Québec	Mbaï-Hadji Mbaïrewaye	2,361	31.32
Québec 21 Équipe JF Gosselin	Sam D. Lachance	1,200	15.92
Option Capitale-Nationale	Louis-Charles Beaudoin-Lacroix	442	5.86
Limoilou District (4)
Party	Council candidate	Vote	%
Équipe Labeaume	Suzanne Verreault (X)	3,906	51.58
Démocratie Québec	Jacquelyn Smith	1,872	24.72
Québec 21 Équipe JF Gosselin	Marie-Anne Veilleux	1,382	18.25
Option Capitale-Nationale	Jean-Philippe Lebrun	318	4.20
Alliance citoyenne de Québec	Alain Giasson	95	1.25
Maizerets-Lairet District (5)
Party	Council candidate	Vote	%
Équipe Labeaume	Geneviève Hamelin (X)	3,651	56.59
Québec 21 Équipe JF Gosselin	Denise Peter	1,604	24.86
Démocratie Québec	Pedro-Nel Marquez	1,197	18.55
Vanier-Duberger District (6)
Party	Council candidate	Vote	%
Équipe Labeaume	Alicia Despins	5,134	57.06
Québec 21 Équipe JF Gosselin	Pierre-Luc Arseneau	2,723	30.27
Démocratie Québec	Philippe Moussette	882	9.80
Option Capitale-Nationale	Félix L'Heureux Bilodeau	204	2.27
Independent	Jean-Christophe Weinbuch	54	0.60
Neufchâtel-Lebourgneuf District (7)
Party	Council candidate	Vote	%
Équipe Labeaume	Jonatan Julien (X)	5,755	55.00
Québec 21 Équipe JF Gosselin	François Thériault	3,439	32.87
Démocratie Québec	Pierre Aubé	987	9.43
Option Capitale-Nationale	Julie Fournier	282	2.70
Les Saules District (8)
Party	Council candidate	Vote	%
Équipe Labeaume	Dominique Tanguay (X)	4,630	51.21
Québec 21 Équipe JF Gosselin	Geneviève Cormier	3,084	34.11
Démocratie Québec	Jean Cloutier	1,190	13.16
Option Capitale-Nationale	Benjamin Guay	138	1.53
Saint-Louis—Sillery District (9)
Party	Council candidate	Vote	%
Équipe Labeaume	Émilie Villeneuve	4,898	46.44
Démocratie Québec	Marie Lacerte	3,557	33.72
Québec 21 Équipe JF Gosselin	Alexandre Pettigrew	1,844	17.48
Option Capitale-Nationale	Ronald Sirard	249	2.36
Du Plateau District (10)
Party	Council candidate	Vote	%
Équipe Labeaume	Rémy Normand (X)	4,320	52.35
Démocratie Québec	Denis L'Anglais	1,840	22.30
Québec 21 Équipe JF Gosselin	Dominique Soucy	1,834	22.22
Option Capitale-Nationale	François Jacques	258	3.13
Pointe-de-Sainte-Foy District (11)
Party	Council candidate	Vote	%
Équipe Labeaume	Anne Corriveau (X)	5,647	55.24
Démocratie Québec	Safia Chefaoui	2,289	22.39
Québec 21 Équipe JF Gosselin	Véronique Boulanger	2,046	22.01
Option Capitale-Nationale	Pascal Minville	161	1.57
Alliance citoyenne de Québec	Virginie Grosbart	80	0.78
Cap-Rouge—Laurentien District (12)
Party	Council candidate	Vote	%
Équipe Labeaume	Marie-Josée Savard	5,377	42.66
Québec 21 Équipe JF Gosselin	Jean-Pierre Asselin	3,404	27.01
Démocratie Québec	Stéphanie Houde	2,066	16.39
Independent	Luc Lescarbeau	1,559	12.37
Option Capitale-Nationale	Gabriel-François Rodrigue-Germain	119	0.94
Alliance citoyenne de Québec	Guy Gendreau	80	0.63
Saint-Rodrigue District (13)
Party	Council candidate	Vote	%
Équipe Labeaume	Vincent Dufresne (X)	5,016	54.40
Québec 21 Équipe JF Gosselin	Mario Hudon	2,843	30.83
Démocratie Québec	Sébastien Tremblay	1,033	11.20
Option Capitale-Nationale	Étienne Boudou-Laforce	166	1.80
Alliance citoyenne de Québec	Daniel Lachance	163	1.77
Louis-XIV District (14)
Party	Council candidate	Vote	%
Équipe Labeaume	Michelle Morin-Doyle (X)	5,907	48.07
Québec 21 Équipe JF Gosselin	Gilles Côté	4,353	35.42
Démocratie Québec	Lise Santerre	1,264	10.29
Independent	Michel Boutet	538	4.38
Option Capitale-Nationale	Kevin Charron	145	1.18
Alliance citoyenne de Québec	Wayne Cyr	82	0.67
Les Monts District (15)
Party	Council candidate	Vote	%
Équipe Labeaume	Patrick Voyer (X)	5,429	47.36
Québec 21 Équipe JF Gosselin	Jean-Alex Martin	4,444	38.76
Démocratie Québec	Brigitte Letarte	1,257	10.96
Option Capitale-Nationale	Arnaud Côté	182	1.59
Alliance citoyenne de Québec	François Jacques	152	1.33
Sainte-Thérèse-de-Lisieux District (16)
Party	Council candidate	Vote	%
Québec 21 Équipe JF Gosselin	Nancy Piuze	4,991	46.05
Équipe Labeaume	Marie France Trudel (X)	4,922	45.41
Démocratie Québec	Maude Grenier	719	6.63
Option Capitale-Nationale	Quentin Toffano-Floury	84	0.78
Alliance citoyenne de Québec	Patrice Fortin	65	0.60
Independent	Fernand Dumont	57	0.53
Chute-Montmorency—Seigneurial District (17)
Party	Council candidate	Vote	%
Québec 21 Équipe JF Gosselin	Stevens Mélançon	5,500	47.18
Équipe Labeaume	Nathalie Roy	5,090	43.66
Démocratie Québec	Michèle Dumas Paradis	823	7.06
Option Capitale-Nationale	Simon Fortin-Dupuis	132	1.13
Alliance citoyenne de Québec	Daniel Beaulieu	112	0.96
Robert-Giffard District (18)
Party	Council candidate	Vote	%
Équipe Labeaume	Jérémie Ernould (X)	5,191	49.89
Québec 21 Équipe JF Gosselin	Michel Bédard	4,027	38.70
Démocratie Québec	Gilles Piché	846	8.13
Option Capitale-Nationale	Fernand Dorval	172	1.65
Alliance citoyenne de Québec	Sylvie Perron	169	1.62
Saint-Charles—Saint-Émile District (19)
Party	Council candidate	Vote	%
Équipe Labeaume	Steeve Verret (X)	5,033	46.68
Québec 21 Équipe JF Gosselin	Sébastien Noël	4,421	41.00
Démocratie Québec	Denis Des Roches	1,113	10.32
Option Capitale-Nationale	Camille Fortin-Dupuis	215	1.99
Loretteville—Les Châtels District (20)
Party	Council candidate	Vote	%
Équipe Labeaume	Raymond Dion (X)	6,020	52.81
Québec 21 Équipe JF Gosselin	Charles Plamondon	3,882	34.06
Démocratie Québec	Louis-Philippe Boudreault	1,253	10.99
Option Capitale-Nationale	Anthony Gagnon	244	2.14
Val-Bélair District (21)
Party	Council candidate	Vote	%
Équipe Labeaume	Sylvain Légaré (X)	4,736	49.23
Québec 21 Équipe JF Gosselin	Bianca Dussault	3,942	40.97
Démocratie Québec	Luc Paquin	659	6.85
Option Capitale-Nationale	Andrée-Anne Leclerc Hamel	167	1.74
Alliance citoyenne de Québec	René Hudon	117	1.22

==== By-election ====
A by-election was held in the Neufchâtel-Lebourgneuf District on December 9, 2018. The results were as follows:

Party	Candidate	Vote	%
Québec 21	Patrick Paquet	2,264	49.26
Équipe Labeaume	Dominique Turgeon	2,139	46.54
Alliance citoyenne	Daniel Brisson	193	4.20
Total valid votes		4,596	22.97

=== Saint-Augustin-de-Desmaures ===
Mayoral candidate	Vote	%
Sylvain Juneau (X)	5,182	68.80
Martin Corbeil	2,350	31.20

=== Sainte-Brigitte-de-Laval ===
Party	Mayoral candidate	Vote	%
Independent	Carl Thomassin	1,189	43.86
Équipe Wanita	Wanita Daniele (X)	1,116	41.17
Independent	Vincent Deblois	224	8.26
Independent	Didier Bonaventure	182	6.71

=== Sainte-Catherine-de-la-Jacques-Cartier ===
Mayoral candidate	Vote	%
Pierre Dolbec (X)	Acclaimed	

=== Saint-Raymond ===
Mayoral candidate	Vote	%
Daniel Dion (X)	3,055	82.77
Marc-Antoine Bernier	636	17.23

=== Shannon ===
Party	Mayoral candidate	Vote	%
Démocratie Shannon	Mike-James Noonan	817	46.11
Independent	Clive Kiley (X)	521	29.40
Independent	Martin Comeau	434	24.49

=== Stoneham-et-Tewkesbury ===
Party	Mayoral candidate	Vote	%
Parti uni des Cantons	Claude Lebel	1,123	35.91
Independent	Louis-Antoine Gagné	1,092	34.92
Parti évolution - Équipe Robert Miller	Robert Miller (X)	912	29.17

== Mauricie ==
=== La Tuque ===
Mayoral candidate	Vote	%
Pierre-David Tremblay	2,102	36.62
Rémy Beaudoin	1,960	34.15
Michel Pronovost	1,466	25.54
Alexandre Quessy	212	3.69

=== Louiseville ===
Mayoral candidate	Vote	%
Yvon Deshaies (X)	2,127	64.71
Guy Richard	717	21.81
Laurent Robitaille	443	13.48

=== Notre-Dame-du-Mont-Carmel ===
Mayoral candidate	Vote	%
Luc Dostaler (X)	1,740	81.81
Lysa Bergeron	387	18.19

=== Shawinigan ===
==== Mayor ====
Mayoral candidate	Vote	%
Michel Angers (X)	11,402	59.92
François Bonenfant	5,131	26.96
Judeline Corriveau	2,496	13.12

==== Shawinigan City Council ====
Candidate	Vote	%
de la Rivière District (1)
Nancy Déziel (X)	1,385	51.45
Roger Castonguay	1,307	48.55
des Boisés District (2)
Martin Asselin (X)	1,362	52.06
Roger Gélinas	525	20.07
Robert Houle	445	17.01
Michel Roy	284	10.86
Val-Maurice District (3)
Guy Arseneault (X)	1,252	47.30
Jacques St-Louis	1,155	43.63
Alain Trudel	240	9.07
Almaville District (4)
Josette Allard-Gignac (X)	1.845	88.19
Rachid Belaada	247	11.81
de la Cité District (5)
Jacinthe Campagna	739	41.49
Alain Lord (X)	704	39.53
Céline Ayotte	264	14.82
Patrice Bolduc	74	4.15
des Montagnes District (6)
Claude Grenier	1,755	62.28
Serge Aubry (X)	1,063	37.72
du Rocher District (7)
Lucie De Bons	831	35.47
René Fugère	814	34.74
Steeve Carrey	698	29.79
des Hêtres District (8)
Jean-Yves Tremblay (X)	1,375	68.58
Jules Gélinas	630	31.42

=== Trois-Rivières ===
==== Mayor ====
Mayoral candidate	Vote	%
Yves Lévesque (X)	26,503	51.37
Jean-François Aubin	23,252	45.07
André Bertrand	1,837	3.56

===== By-election =====
A mayoral by-election was held May 5, 2019 to replace Lévesque.

Mayoral candidate	Vote	%
Jean Lamarche	22,225	54.91
Jean-François Aubin	13,558	33.50
Eric Lord	4,312	10.65
Pierre-Benoit Fortin	377	0.93

==== Trois-Rivières City Council ====
Candidate	Vote	%
Carmel District (1)
Pierre Montreuil	1,892	53.90
André Noël (X)	1,618	46.10
des Carrefours District (2)
Valérie Renaud-Martin	2,465	63.32
Yves Landry (X)	1,428	36.68
Châteaudun District (3)
Luc Tremblay (X)	1,935	47.83
Jennie Perron	989	24.44
André Mélançon	566	13.99
Sylvain Courchesne	556	13.74
Chavigny District (4)
Maryse Bellemare	1,876	53.58
Marie-Claude Camirand (X)	1,625	46.42
des Estacades District (5)
Pierre-Luc Fortin (X)	2,284	57.44
Claire Leblanc	996	25.05
Jérôme Francoeur	696	17.51
des Forges District (6)
Mariannick Mercure	1,924	48.99
Jeannot Lemieux (X)	1,159	29.51
Yves Boissonneault Jr.	531	13.52
François Bourassa	313	7.97
La-Vérendrye District (7)
Dany Carpentier	1,392	48.18
Jimmy Boisvert	696	24.09
Pierre A. Dupont (X)	675	23.36
Alain Martel	126	4.36
Madeleine District (8)
Sabrina Roy (X)	1,848	55.50
Gaétan Laperrière Jr.	1,298	38.98
Yves Lapierre	184	5.53
Marie-de-l'Incarnation District (9)
Denis Roy	1,232	43.95
Serge Parent	585	20.87
André Lapierre	491	17.52
Tania Brisson	255	9.10
Christian Duval	122	4.35
Jonathan Poulin	118	4.21
Pointe-du-Lac District (10)
François Bélisle (X)	2,124	56.43
Robert Boisvert	887	23.57
Roland Manseau	607	16.13
Denis St-Ours	146	3.88
Richelieu District (11)
Ginette Bellemare (X)	2,682	62.20
Nicolas Mêlé	1,630	37.80
des Rivières District (12)
Ferron Claude	2,262	52.11
Joan Lefebvre (X)	2,079	47.89
Sainte-Marthe District (13)
Daniel Cournoyer (X)	1,757	47.60
Louise Thibeault Goyette	1,713	46.41
Dany Poulin	221	5.99
Saint-Louis-de-France District (14)
Michel Cormier (X)	Acclaimed	

== Estrie ==
=== Asbestos ===
Mayoral candidate	Vote	%
Hugues Grimard (X)	Acclaimed	

=== Coaticook ===
Mayoral candidate	Vote	%
Simon Madore	2,277	57.87
Raynald Drolet	1,658	42.13

=== Cookshire-Eaton ===
Mayoral candidate	Vote	%
Sylvie Lapointe	806	43.24
Marc Turcotte	686	36.80
Yvon Roy	372	19.96

=== Lac-Mégantic ===
Party	Mayoral candidate	Vote	%
Independent	Julie Morin	1,829	69.28
Independent	Ronald Martel	741	28.07
Vision Citoyen Mégantic	St-Pierre Jean	70	2.65

=== Magog ===
Mayoral candidate	Vote	%
Vicki-May Hamm (X)	6,379	63.00
Marc Delisle	2,981	29.44
Johanne Bouchard	766	7.56

=== Sherbrooke ===
==== Mayor ====
Party	Mayoral candidate	Vote	%
Independent	Steve Lussier	22,789	43.54
Équipe Bernard Sévigny - Renouveau sherbrookois	Bernard Sévigny (X)	16,821	32.14
Sherbrooke citoyen	Hélène Pigot	11,299	21.59
Independent	Denis Pellerin	947	1.81
Independent	Patrick Tétreault	481	0.92
Total valid votes		52,337	43.84

==== Sherbrooke City Council ====
Deauville District
Party	Council candidate	Vote	%
Independent	Pierre Tremblay	2,148	51.42
Équipe Bernard Sévigny - Renouveau sherbrookois	Diane Délisle (X)	1,430	34.24
Sherbrooke citoyen	Danielle Gentès	599	14.34
Rock Forest District
Party	Council candidate	Vote	%
Independent	Annie Godbout (X)	2,990	63.92
Équipe Bernard Sévigny - Renouveau sherbrookois	Bruno Vachon (X)	1,259	26.91
Sherbrooke citoyen	Alissia Beauregard	429	9.17
Saint-Élie District
Party	Council candidate	Vote	%
Independent	Julien Lachance (X)	2,365	54.80
Independent	Christelle Fefèvre	1,079	25.00
Independent	Nathalie Ramonda	394	9.13
Équipe Bernard Sévigny - Renouveau sherbrookois	Sébastien Aubé	357	8.27
Sherbrooke citoyen	Mohamed Barouti	121	2.80
Brompton District
Party	Council candidate	Vote	%
Independent	Nicole Bergeron (X)	2,248	84.64
Équipe Bernard Sévigny - Renouveau sherbrookois	Mélanie Lemay	219	8.25
Sherbrooke citoyen	Raymond Gaudreault	189	7.12
l'Hôtel-Dieu District
Party	Council candidate	Vote	%
Independent	Rémi Demers (X)	2,149	60.54
Équipe Bernard Sévigny - Renouveau sherbrookois	Geneviève Hébert	788	22.20
Sherbrooke citoyen	André Poulin	613	17.27
Desranleau District
Party	Council candidate	Vote	%
Équipe Bernard Sévigny - Renouveau sherbrookois	Danielle Berthold (X)	1,572	40.19
Independent	Pascal Cyr	1,295	33.11
Sherbrooke citoyen	Richard Vachon	1,044	26.69
des Quatre-Saisons District
Party	Council candidate	Vote	%
Équipe Bernard Sévigny - Renouveau sherbrookois	Vincent Boutin (X)	1,145	38.27
Sherbrooke citoyen	Christine Labrie	1,088	36.36
Independent	Éric Blanc	759	25.37
Pin-Solitaire District
Party	Council candidate	Vote	%
Independent	Pierre Avard	1,145	36.52
Sherbrooke citoyen	Ludovick Nadeau	924	29.47
Équipe Bernard Sévigny - Renouveau sherbrookois	Mariette Fugère	880	28.07
Independent	Maxime Beauregard-Dionne	186	5.93
Lennoxville District
Party	Council candidate	Vote	%
Independent	Claude Charron	903	51.54
Independent	Linda Boulanger	482	27.51
Sherbrooke citoyen	Michael Labarre	196	11.19
Équipe Bernard Sévigny - Renouveau sherbrookois	François-René Montpetit	89	5.08
Independent	Roy Patterson	82	4.68
d'Upland District (Borough Council)
Party	Council candidate	Vote	%
Independent	Jennifer Garfat	435	42.36
Sherbrooke citoyen	Gabrielle Gagnon	314	30.57
Independent	Daniel Pellerin	278	27.07
de Fairview District (Borough Council)
Party	Council candidate	Vote	%
Independent	Bertrand Collins	408	58.04
Sherbrooke citoyen	Vicky Poirier	295	41.96
l'Université District
Party	Council candidate	Vote	%
Independent	Paul Gingues	1,921	43.94
Sherbrooke citoyen	Julie Dionne	1,462	33.44
Équipe Bernard Sévigny - Renouveau sherbrookois	Nicole A. Gagnon	989	22.62
Ascot District
Party	Council candidate	Vote	%
Independent	Karine Godbout	1,466	44.67
Sherbrooke citoyen	Edwin Moreno	796	24.25
Équipe Bernard Sévigny - Renouveau sherbrookois	Robert Y. Pouliot (X)	637	19.41
Independent	Guy Couture	383	11.67
Lac-des-Nations District
Party	Council candidate	Vote	%
Independent	Chantal L'Espérance (X)	1,253	36.26
Sherbrooke citoyen	Raïs Kibonge M.	1,053	30.47
Équipe Bernard Sévigny - Renouveau sherbrookois	Sylvain Raby	559	16.17
Independent	Éric La Chapelle	410	11.86
Independent	Hubert Richard	181	5.24
Golf District
Party	Council candidate	Vote	%
Independent	Marc Denault (X)	3,389	63.50
Équipe Bernard Sévigny - Renouveau sherbrookois	Christine Ouellet (X)	968	18.14
Sherbrooke citoyen	Laurie Bush	506	9.48
Independent	François Proulx	474	8.88
Carrefour District
Party	Council candidate	Vote	%
Sherbrooke citoyen	Évelyne Beaudin	2,042	43.16
Independent	Pierre Tardif (X)	1,853	39.17
Équipe Bernard Sévigny - Renouveau sherbrookois	Nadia Choubane	836	17.67

=== Windsor ===
Mayoral candidate	Vote	%
Sylvie Bureau (X)	Acclaimed	

== Montréal ==
=== Baie-D'Urfé ===
Party	Mayoral candidate	Vote	%
Équipe Baie-D'Urfé Team	Maria Tutino (X)	993	56.97
Independent	Alex Habrich	411	23.58
Independent	Peter Fletcher	339	19.45
Total valid votes		1,743	61.2

=== Beaconsfield ===
Mayoral candidate	Vote	%
Georges Bourelle (X)	4,099	63.81
James Bonnell	2,325	36.19

=== Côte-Saint-Luc ===
Mayoral candidate	Vote	%
Mitchell Brownstein (X)	5,605	57.80
Robert Libman	4,092	42.20

=== Dollard-des-Ormeaux ===
==== Mayor ====
Mayoral candidate	Vote	%
Alex Bottausci	6,282	50.06
Edward Janiszewski (X)	5,226	41.64
Raman Chopra	544	4.34
Isabel Maicas	497	3.96

==== Dollard-des-Ormeaux City Council ====
Candidate	Vote	%
District 1
Laurence Parent	1,209	69.24
Zoe Bayouk (X)	537	30.76
District 2
Errol Johnson (X)	Acclaimed	
District 3
Mickey Max Guttman (X)	1,086	80.80
Shama Chopra	258	19.20
District 4
Herbert Brownstein (X)	895	47.15
Jamie Benizri	735	38.72
Catherine Thomas	268	14.12
District 5
Morris Vesely (X)	764	49.04
Simon Sadeh	445	28.56
Robert Wiseman	349	22.40
District 6
Valérie Assouline	869	53.18
Peter Prassas (X)	765	46.82
District 7
Pulkit Kantawala	664	46.24
Ryan Brownstein	636	44.29
Salomon Sam Gabbay	136	9.47
District 8
Colette Gauthier (X)	844	57.81
Byron LeBlanc	413	28.29
Bill Pagonis	203	13.90

=== Dorval ===
Party	Mayoral candidate	Vote	%
Action Dorval	Edgar Rouleau (X)	3,750	71.23
Independent	Giovanni Baruffa	592	11.24
Independent	Marc Barrette	335	6.36
Independent	Michel Fontaine	310	5.89
Independent	Mario Mammone	278	5.28
Total valid votes		5,265	37.1

=== Hampstead ===
Mayoral candidate	Vote	%
William Steinberg (X)	Acclaimed	

=== Kirkland ===
Mayoral candidate	Vote	%
Michel Gibson (X)	Acclaimed	

=== L'Île-Dorval ===
Mayoral candidate	Vote	%
Gisèle Chapleau (X)	Acclaimed	

=== Montreal ===
Party	Mayoral candidate	Vote	%
Projet Montréal - Équipe Valérie Plante	Valérie Plante	243,242	51.36
Équipe Denis Coderre pour Montréal	Denis Coderre (X)	216,104	45.63
Coalition Montréal	Jean Fortier	6,153	1.30
Independent	Bernard Gurberg	2,141	0.45
Independent	Gilbert Thibodeau	1,671	0.35
Independent	Fabrice Ntompa Ilunga	1,611	0.34
Independent	Philippe Tessier	1,453	0.31
Independent	Tyler Lemco	1,258	0.27
Total valid votes		473,633	42.46

=== Montréal-Est ===
Party	Mayoral candidate	Vote	%
Équipe Coutu	Robert Coutu (X)	927	61.64
L'Équipe du citoyen	Jonathan Dauphinais-Fortin	577	38.36
Total valid votes		1,504	53.3

=== Montreal West ===
Mayoral candidate	Vote	%
Beny Masella (X)	1,285	67.63
Norbert Bedoucha	615	32.37

=== Mount Royal ===
Party	Mayoral candidate	Vote	%
Action Mont-Royal	Philippe Roy (X)	Acclaimed	

=== Pointe-Claire ===
Mayoral candidate	Vote	%
John Belvedere	6,268	60.07
Aldo Iermieri	3,125	29.95
Timothy Lloyd Thomas	827	7.93
Teodor Daiev	214	2.05

=== Sainte-Anne-de-Bellevue ===
Mayoral candidate	Vote	%
Paola Hawa (X)	1,063	53.63
Lucia LaRose	919	46.37

=== Senneville ===
Mayoral candidate	Vote	%
Julie Brisebois	245	48.42
George McLeish	226	44.66
Charles Mickie	35	6.92

=== Westmount ===
Mayoral candidate	Vote	%
Christina M. Smith (X)	3,619	60.07
Patrick Martin	1,878	31.17
Beryl Wajsman	528	8.76

== Outaouais ==
=== Cantley ===
Mayoral candidate	Vote	%
Madeleine Brunette (X)	1,935	61.78
David Gomes	1,197	38.22

=== Chelsea ===
Mayoral candidate	Vote	%
Caryl Green (X)	2,010	63.77
Tim Kehoe	780	24.75
Edmond Hétu	362	11.48

=== Gatineau ===
Party	Mayoral candidate	Vote	%
Équipe Pedneaud-Jobin - Action Gatineau	Maxime Pedneaud-Jobin (X)	33,537	45.14
Independent	Denis Tassé	22,295	30.01
Independent	Sylvie Goneau	12,964	17.45
Independent	Clément Bélanger	3,739	5.03
Independent	Rémi Bergeron	1,761	2.37
Total valid votes		74,296	38.52

=== Gracefield ===
Mayoral candidate	Vote	%
Réal Rochon	680	47.32
Paul Caron	395	27.49
Joanne Poulin (X)	362	25.19

=== L'Ange-Gardien ===
Mayoral candidate	Vote	%
Marc Louis-Seize	1,178	76.20
Michel Dambremont	368	23.80

=== La Pêche ===
Mayoral candidate	Vote	%
Guillaume Lamoureux	1,625	50.50
Robert Bussière (X)	1,593	49.50

=== Papineauville ===
Mayoral candidate	Vote	%
Christian Beauchamp (X)	Acclaimed	

=== Pontiac ===
Mayoral candidate	Vote	%
Joanne Labadie	1,227	59.02
Roger Larose (X)	852	40.98

=== Val-des-Monts ===
Mayoral candidate	Vote	%
Jacques Laurin (X)	2,024	65.99
Richard Bélec	1,043	34.01

== Abitibi-Témiscamingue ==
=== Amos ===
Mayoral candidate	Vote	%
Sébastien D'Astous (X)	3,196	92.05
Robert Audette	276	7.95

=== La Sarre ===
Mayoral candidate	Vote	%
Yves Dubé	Acclaimed	

=== Rouyn-Noranda ===
==== Mayor ====
Mayoral candidate	Vote	%
Diane Dallaire	6,985	43.56
Mario Provencher (X)	4,504	28.09
Philippe Marquis	4,369	27.24
Vuyani Gxoyiya	142	0.89
Richard St-Michel	36	0.22

==== Rouyn-Noranda City Council ====
Candidate	Vote	%
Noranda-Nord/Lac-Dufault District (1)
Valérie Morin	954	71.30
Bob Bouchard	155	11.58
Paul Marchand	116	8.67
Ghislain Dallaire	113	8.45
Rouyn-Noranda-Ouest District (2)
Sylvie Turgeon (X)	1,054	64.78
Alexe Séguin-Carrier	469	28.83
Gabrielle Gauthier	104	6.39
Rouyn-Sud District (3)
André Philippon (X)	688	53.13
Maurice Duclos	493	38.07
Alexandre Boucher	114	8.80
Centre-Ville District (4)
Claudette Carignan	687	56.97
Gerry St-Hilaire	271	22.47
Chantal Auclair	248	20.56
Noranda District (5)
Denise Lavallée	577	50.84
Robert B. Brière (X)	440	38.77
Pascal Gélinas	118	10.40
de l'Université District (6)
Daniel Marcotte	603	48.05
Jason Brushey	436	34.74
Luc Brassard	216	17.21
Granada/Bellecombe District (7)
Luc Lacroix (X)	1,070	67.38
Simon Lapierre	309	19.46
Émilie Préville	209	13.16
Marie-Victorin/Du Sourire District (8)
François Cotnoir (X)	1,174	70.22
Ian Marcotte	434	25.96
Anthony Guillemette	64	3.83
Évain District (9)
Samuelle Ramsay-Houle	831	61.56
André Tessier	519	38.44
Kekeko District (10)
Cédric Laplante	657	47.92
Marie-Ève Bastien	496	36.18
Normand Gaudet	116	8.46
Jean-Pierre Frelas	102	7.44
McWatters/Cadillac District (11)
Benjamin Tremblay	612	58.01
Jean Claude Chouinard (X)	443	41.99
Aiguebelle District (12)
Stéphane Girard	Acclaimed	

=== Val-d'Or ===
Mayoral candidate	Vote	%
Pierre Corbeil (X)	Acclaimed	

== Côte-Nord ==
=== Baie-Comeau ===
Mayoral candidate	Vote	%
Yves Montigny	5,118	68.04
Yvon Boudreau	2,404	31.96

=== Fermont ===
Mayoral candidate	Vote	%
Martin St-Laurent (X)	Acclaimed	

=== Havre-Saint-Pierre ===
Mayoral candidate	Vote	%
Berchmans Boudreau (X)	Acclaimed	

=== L'Île-d'Anticosti ===
Mayoral candidate	Vote	%
John Pineault (X)	Acclaimed	

=== Port-Cartier ===
Mayoral candidate	Vote	%
Alain Thibault	1,506	57.83
Violaine Doyle (X)	1,098	42.17

=== Sept-Îles ===
Mayoral candidate	Vote	%
Réjean Porlier (X)	5,748	56.93
Russel Tremblay	4,348	43.07

=== Tadoussac ===
Mayoral candidate	Vote	%
Charles Breton	307	67.32
Ken Gagné	149	32.68

== Nord-du-Québec ==
=== Chapais ===
Mayoral candidate	Vote	%
Steve Gamache (X)	Acclaimed	

=== Chibougamau ===
Mayoral candidate	Vote	%
Manon Cyr (X)	1,555	51.75
Daniel Bergeron	1,411	46.96
Martin Houle	39	1.30

=== Lebel-sur-Quévillon ===
Party	Mayoral candidate	Vote	%
Équipe Denis Lemoyne	Denis Lemoyne	504	48.05
Équipe Poirier	Alain Poirier (X)	545	51.95
Total valid votes		1,049	63.2

=== Matagami ===
Mayoral candidate	Vote	%
René Dubé (X)	Acclaimed	

== Gaspésie–Îles-de-la-Madeleine ==
=== Bonaventure ===
Mayoral candidate	Vote	%
Roch Audet (X)	719	48.71
Bernard Babin	540	36.59
Caroline Duchesne	217	14.70

=== Cap-Chat ===
Mayoral candidate	Vote	%
Marie Gratton	943	68.78
Judes Landry (X)	428	31.22

=== Caplan ===
Mayoral candidate	Vote	%
Lise Castilloux (X)	597	51.20
Doris Boissonnault	569	48.80

=== Carleton-sur-Mer ===
Mayoral candidate	Vote	%
Mathieu Lapointe	1,050	49.67
Alain Turcotte	948	44.84
Normand Parr	116	5.49

=== Cascapédia–Saint-Jules ===
Mayoral candidate	Vote	%
Allan Barter	70	19.39
Brigitte Beaudoin	13	3.60
Gaetan (Guy) Boudreau	278	77.01

=== Chandler ===
Mayoral candidate	Vote	%
Louisette Langlois (X)	2,273	54.81
Gilles Daraiche	1,874	45.19

=== Cloridorme ===
Mayoral candidate	Vote	%
Denis Fortin	310	65.54
Marc Caron (X)	163	34.46

=== Escuminac ===
Mayoral candidate	Vote	%
Robert Bruce Wafer (X)	182	54.98
Dee Anne Deschamps-McNally	149	45.02

=== Gaspé ===
Mayoral candidate	Vote	%
Daniel Côté (X)	4,850	91.30
Jean Lapointe	462	8.70

=== Grande-Rivière ===
Mayoral candidate	Vote	%
Gino Cyr	920	47.08
Charles Cyr	519	26.56
Bernard Stevens (X)	515	26.36

=== Grande-Vallée ===
Mayoral candidate	Vote	%
Noel Richard	464	60.34
Sonia Minville	305	39.66

=== Grosse-Île ===
Mayoral candidate	Vote	%
Rose Elmonde Clarke (X)	Acclaimed	

=== Hope ===
Mayoral candidate	Vote	%
Hazen Whittom (X)	Acclaimed	

=== Hope Town ===
Mayoral candidate	Vote	%
Linda MacWhirter (X)	Acclaimed	

=== La Martre ===
Mayoral candidate	Vote	%
Yves Sohier (X)	Acclaimed	

=== L'Ascension-de-Patapédia ===
Mayoral candidate	Vote	%
Guy Richard	Acclaimed	

=== Les Îles-de-la-Madeleine ===
Mayoral candidate	Vote	%
Jonathan Lapierre (X)	4,117	74.03
Dominique Gladyszewski	1,444	25.97

=== Maria ===
Mayoral candidate	Vote	%
Christian Leblanc (X)	913	77.50
Gilbert Forget	265	22.50

=== Marsoui ===
Mayoral candidate	Vote	%
Ghislain Deschenes	145	61.70
Jovette Gasse	90	38.30

=== Matapédia ===
Mayoral candidate	Vote	%
Nicole Lagacé	220	57.14
J. Alan Morrisson	165	42.86

=== Mont-Saint-Pierre ===
Mayoral candidate	Vote	%
Magella Emond	103	66.45
Lynda Laflamme (X)	52	33.55

=== Murdochville ===
Mayoral candidate	Vote	%
Délisca Roussy (X)	191	48.85
Marc Lemieux	177	45.27
Michel Després	12	3.07
Manon Leclerc	11	2.81

=== New Carlisle ===
Mayoral candidate	Vote	%
Stephen Chatterton (X)	382	50.46
Wilfrid Larocque	223	29.46
Freddy Boudreau	152	20.08

=== New Richmond ===
Mayoral candidate	Vote	%
Éric Dubé (X)	Acclaimed	

=== Nouvelle ===
Mayoral candidate	Vote	%
Richard St-Laurent (X)	Acclaimed	

=== Paspébiac ===
Mayoral candidate	Vote	%
Regent Bastien	1,085	58.33
Frédéric Delarosbil	650	34.95
Kamel-Eddine Habiche	125	6.72

=== Percé ===
Mayoral candidate	Vote	%
Cathy Poirier	1,184	67.31
Owen Bouchard	423	24.05
Guillaume Arbour	77	4.38
J. Alexandre Chouinard	59	3.35
Jean Guy Dubé	16	0.91

=== Petite-Vallée ===
Mayoral candidate	Vote	%
Noel-Marie Clavet	Acclaimed	

=== Pointe-à-la-Croix ===
Mayoral candidate	Vote	%
Pascal Bujold	354	53.07
Charles Guérette	313	46.93

=== Port-Daniel–Gascons ===
Mayoral candidate	Vote	%
Henri Grenier (X)	884	57.03
Jean-Marc McInnis	408	26.32
Maurice Anglehart	258	26.65

=== Ristigouche-Partie-Sud-Est ===
Mayoral candidate	Vote	%
François Boulay (X)	Acclaimed	

=== Rivière-à-Claude ===
Mayoral candidate	Vote	%
Réjean Normand (X)	Acclaimed	

=== Saint-Alexis-de-Matapédia ===
Mayoral candidate	Vote	%
Guy Gallant (X)	Acclaimed	

=== Saint-Alphonse ===
Party	Mayoral candidate	Vote	%
Independent	Gérard Porlier (X)	251	58.92
Démocratie Participative	Bertin St-Onge	175	41.08
Total valid votes		426	69.7

=== Saint-André-de-Restigouche ===
Mayoral candidate	Vote	%
Doris Deschênes (X)	Acclaimed	

=== Sainte-Anne-des-Monts ===
Mayoral candidate	Vote	%
Simon Deschênes (X)	Acclaimed	

=== Saint-Elzéar ===
Mayoral candidate	Vote	%
Marie-Louis Bourdages	270	91.22
Raymond Marcoux (X)	26	8.78

=== Sainte-Madeleine-de-la-Rivière-Madeleine ===
Mayoral candidate	Vote	%
Joël Côté (X)	194	61.01
Arlette Fortin	113	35.53
Michel English	11	3.46

=== Sainte-Thérèse-de-Gaspé ===
Mayoral candidate	Vote	%
Roberto Blondin	Acclaimed	

=== Saint-François-d'Assise ===
Mayoral candidate	Vote	%
Ghislain Michaud (X)	Acclaimed	

=== Saint-Godefroi ===
Mayoral candidate	Vote	%
Genade Grenier	166	55.33
Gérard Raymond Blais (X)	134	44.67

=== Saint-Maxime-du-Mont-Louis ===
Mayoral candidate	Vote	%
Guy Bernatchez	334	56.90
Serge Chrétien (X)	253	43.10

=== Saint-Siméon ===
Mayoral candidate	Vote	%
Denis Gauthier	463	64.39
Denis Drouin	256	35.61

=== Shigawake ===
Mayoral candidate	Vote	%
Colette Dow	153	65.67
Denzil John Ross (X)	80	34.33

== Chaudière-Appalaches ==
=== Beauceville ===
Mayoral candidate	Vote	%
Luc Provençal (X)	Acclaimed	

=== Lévis ===
==== Mayor ====
Party	Mayoral candidate	Vote	%
Lévis Force 10 - Équipe Lehouillier	Gilles Lehouillier (X)	36,915	92.16
Independent	André Voyer	3,139	7.84
Total valid votes		40,054	36.51

==== Lévis City Council ====
Saint-Étienne District (1)
Party	Council candidate	Vote	%
Lévis Force 10 - Équipe Lehouillier	Mario Fortier (X)	2,540	85.21
Independent	Liliane Jeffrey	441	14.79
Saint-Nicolas District (2)
Party	Council candidate	Vote	%
Lévis Force 10 - Équipe Lehouillier	Clement Genest (X)	Acclaimed	
Villieu District (3)
Party	Council candidate	Vote	%
Lévis Force 10 - Équipe Lehouillier	Isabelle Demers	2,843	86.57
Renouveau Lévis	Eric Lambert	441	13.43
Saint-Rédempteur District (4)
Party	Council candidate	Vote	%
Lévis Force 10 - Équipe Lehouillier	Réjean Lamontagne (X)	Acclaimed	
Charny District (5)
Party	Council candidate	Vote	%
Lévis Force 10 - Équipe Lehouillier	Karine Lavertu	2,523	84.72
Renouveau Lévis	Maryse Labranche	455	15.28
Breakeyville District (6)
Party	Council candidate	Vote	%
Lévis Force 10 - Équipe Lehouillier	Michel Turner (X)	Acclaimed	
Saint-Jean District (7)
Party	Council candidate	Vote	%
Lévis Force 10 - Équipe Lehouillier	Guy Dumoulin (X)	Acclaimed	
Taniata District (8)
Party	Council candidate	Vote	%
Lévis Force 10 - Équipe Lehouillier	Karine Laflamme	Acclaimed	
Saint-Romuald District (9)
Party	Council candidate	Vote	%
Lévis Force 10 - Équipe Lehouillier	Brigitte Duchesneau (X)	Acclaimed	
Notre-Dame District (10)
Party	Council candidate	Vote	%
Lévis Force 10 - Équipe Lehouillier	Steve Dorval	Acclaimed	
Saint-David District (11)
Party	Council candidate	Vote	%
Lévis Force 10 - Équipe Lehouillier	Serge Côté (X)	Acclaimed	
Christ-Roi District (12)
Party	Council candidate	Vote	%
Lévis Force 10 - Équipe Lehouillier	Janet Jones (X)	2,476	82.78
Renouveau Lévis	Sébastien Bouchard-Théberge	515	17.22
Bienville District (13)
Party	Council candidate	Vote	%
Lévis Force 10 - Équipe Lehouillier	Amélie Landry	1,970	69.69
Independent	Raphaël Samson	742	26.25
Renouveau Lévis	Guy Roy	115	4.07
Lauzon District (14)
Party	Council candidate	Vote	%
Lévis Force 10 - Équipe Lehouillier	Fleur Paradis (X)	Acclaimed	
Pintendre District (15)
Party	Council candidate	Vote	%
Lévis Force 10 - Équipe Lehouillier	Ann Jeffrey (X)	Acclaimed	

=== Montmagny ===
Mayoral candidate	Vote	%
Rémy Langevin	2,321	50.65
Marc Laurin	1,742	38.02
Sébastien Clavet	519	11.33

=== Saint-Apollinaire ===
Mayoral candidate	Vote	%
Bernard Ouellet (X)	1,541	75.39
Yves Mailly	503	24.61

=== Sainte-Marie ===
Mayoral candidate	Vote	%
Gaétan Vachon (X)	Acclaimed	

=== Saint-Georges ===
Mayoral candidate	Vote	%
Claude Morin (X)	Acclaimed	

=== Saint-Henri ===
Mayoral candidate	Vote	%
Germain Caron	Acclaimed	

=== Saint-Lambert-de-Lauzon ===
Mayoral candidate	Vote	%
Olivier Dumais	1,175	53.19
Éric Pichette	627	28.38
Jacques Grondin	407	18.42

=== Thetford Mines ===
Mayoral candidate	Vote	%
Marc-Alexandre Brousseau (X)	7,024	81.99
David Poulin	1,543	18.01

== Laval ==
=== Mayor ===
Party	Mayoral candidate	Vote	%
Mouvement lavallois - Équipe Marc Demers	Marc Demers (X)	50,805	46.24
Parti Laval - Équipe Michel Trottier	Michel Trottier	22,417	20.40
Action Laval - Équipe Jean Claude Gobé	Jean Claude Gobé	17,624	16.04
Avenir Laval - Équipe Sonia Baudelot	Sonia Baudelot	17,155	15.61
Alliance des conseillers autonomes - Équipe Alain Lecompte et Cynthia Leblanc	Alain Lecompte	763	0.69
Independent	Hélène Goupil	733	0.67
Independent	Nicolas Lemire	375	0.34
Total valid votes		109,872	36.32

==== Laval City Council ====
Saint-François District (1)
Party	Council candidate	Vote	%
Mouvement lavallois - Équipe Marc Demers	Eric Morasse	1,609	32.77
Independent	Anne-Marie Bédard	1,145	23.32
Parti Laval - Équipe Michel Trottier	Fabrice Kamion	1,099	22.38
Action Laval - Équipe Jean Claude Gobé	Micheline Boucher Granger	625	12.73
Avenir Laval - Équipe Sonia Baudelot	Vary Jacquet	432	8.80
Saint-Vincent-de-Paul District (2)
Party	Council candidate	Vote	%
Mouvement lavallois - Équipe Marc Demers	Paolo Galati (X)	2,566	51.17
Avenir Laval - Équipe Sonia Baudelot	Alain Leboeuf	918	18.31
Action Laval - Équipe Jean Claude Gobé	Vittorino Di Genova	804	16.03
Parti Laval - Équipe Michel Trottier	Sylvie Richer	727	14.50
Val-des-Arbres District (3)
Party	Council candidate	Vote	%
Mouvement lavallois - Équipe Marc Demers	Christiane Yoakim (X)	2,088	38.61
Action Laval - Équipe Jean Claude Gobé	Achille T. Cifelli	1,690	31.25
Parti Laval - Équipe Michel Trottier	Christine Mitton	1,047	19.36
Avenir Laval - Équipe Sonia Baudelot	Bilal Khoder	583	10.78
Duvernay—Pont-Viau District (4)
Party	Council candidate	Vote	%
Mouvement lavallois - Équipe Marc Demers	Stéphane Boyer (X)	2,852	60.21
Parti Laval - Équipe Michel Trottier	Guy Lalande	822	17.35
Action Laval - Équipe Jean Claude Gobé	Stéphane Bacon	620	13.09
Avenir Laval - Équipe Sonia Baudelot	Michel Marceau	362	7.64
Alliance des conseillers autonomes - Équipe Alain Lecompte et Cynthia Leblanc	Chafiq Amkak	81	1.71
Marigot District (5)
Party	Council candidate	Vote	%
Mouvement lavallois - Équipe Marc Demers	Daniel Hébert (X)	1,908	48.43
Action Laval - Équipe Jean Claude Gobé	Lissette Martel	812	20.61
Parti Laval - Équipe Michel Trottier	Frédérick Bertrand	732	18.58
Avenir Laval - Équipe Sonia Baudelot	Oussema Boutaous	412	10.46
Alliance des conseillers autonomes - Équipe Alain Lecompte et Cynthia Leblanc	Cristian Bucur	76	1.93
Concorde—Bois-de-Boulogne District (6)
Party	Council candidate	Vote	%
Mouvement lavallois - Équipe Marc Demers	Sandra Desmeules (X)	1,995	53.16
Parti Laval - Équipe Michel Trottier	Chloé Thauvette	897	23.90
Avenir Laval - Équipe Sonia Baudelot	Mireille Abou-Fakhr	453	12.07
Action Laval - Équipe Jean Claude Gobé	Julius Bute	408	10.87
Renaud District (7)
Party	Council candidate	Vote	%
Mouvement lavallois - Équipe Marc Demers	Aram Elagoz	2,197	41.06
Action Laval - Équipe Jean Claude Gobé	Antoine Menassa	1,109	20.73
Parti Laval - Équipe Michel Trottier	Jacques Roberge	1,099	20.54
Avenir Laval - Équipe Sonia Baudelot	André Naous	946	17.68
Vimont District (8)
Party	Council candidate	Vote	%
Mouvement lavallois - Équipe Marc Demers	Michel Poissant (X)	2,927	50.45
Parti Laval - Équipe Michel Trottier	Gilles Boudreau	1,341	23.11
Action Laval - Équipe Jean Claude Gobé	Diane Pagé	868	14.96
Avenir Laval - Équipe Sonia Baudelot	Maria Grillo	666	11.48
Saint-Bruno District (9)
Party	Council candidate	Vote	%
Mouvement lavallois - Équipe Marc Demers	David De Cotis (X)	3,395	57.53
Parti Laval - Équipe Michel Trottier	Fabio Interdonato	1,099	18.62
Action Laval - Équipe Jean Claude Gobé	Marie-France Pelletier	750	12.71
Avenir Laval - Équipe Sonia Baudelot	Stefanie Alessia Covello	657	11.13
Auteuil District (10)
Party	Council candidate	Vote	%
Mouvement lavallois - Équipe Marc Demers	Jocelyne Frédéric Gauthier (X)	2,432	45.54
Parti Laval - Équipe Michel Trottier	Michel Cantin	1,165	21.82
Action Laval - Équipe Jean Claude Gobé	Rachel Demers	874	16.37
Avenir Laval - Équipe Sonia Baudelot	Beby Beaubrun	869	16.27
Laval-des-Rapides District (11)
Party	Council candidate	Vote	%
Mouvement lavallois - Équipe Marc Demers	Isabella Tassoni	2,064	43.83
Parti Laval - Équipe Michel Trottier	Pierre Anthian (X)	1,903	40.41
Action Laval - Équipe Jean Claude Gobé	Vania Atudorei	381	8.09
Avenir Laval - Équipe Sonia Baudelot	Anwar Abilmouna	361	7.67
Souvenir-Labelle District (12)
Party	Council candidate	Vote	%
Mouvement lavallois - Équipe Marc Demers	Sandra El-Helou	2,486	52.65
Avenir Laval - Équipe Sonia Baudelot	Lynda Briguene	936	19.82
Action Laval - Équipe Jean Claude Gobé	Viviane Monette	879	18.61
Parti Laval - Équipe Michel Trottier	Jean Coupal (X)	421	8.92
L'Abord-à-Plouffe District (13)
Party	Council candidate	Vote	%
Mouvement lavallois - Équipe Marc Demers	Vasilios Karidogiannis (X)	2,015	45.31
Avenir Laval - Équipe Sonia Baudelot	Zitta MC Hake	1,023	23.00
Action Laval - Équipe Jean Claude Gobé	Sayed Melhem	877	19.72
Parti Laval - Équipe Michel Trottier	George Adamou	532	11.96
Chomedey District (14)
Party	Council candidate	Vote	%
Action Laval - Équipe Jean Claude Gobé	Aglaia Revelakis (X)	2,083	47.00
Mouvement lavallois - Équipe Marc Demers	Grace Ghazal	1,220	27.53
Avenir Laval - Équipe Sonia Baudelot	Dimitrios Tzikas	670	15.12
Parti Laval - Équipe Michel Trottier	Jeanine El Turk	401	9.05
Independent	Mowafak Nassani	58	1.31
Saint-Martin District (15)
Party	Council candidate	Vote	%
Mouvement lavallois - Équipe Marc Demers	Aline Dib (X)	2,245	47.05
Action Laval - Équipe Jean Claude Gobé	Stefano Bramos	1,074	22.51
Avenir Laval - Équipe Sonia Baudelot	Alain Leclair	827	17.33
Parti Laval - Équipe Michel Trottier	Hanane Nasr	452	9.47
Independent	Peter Koutroumanis	174	3.65
Sainte-Dorothée District (16)
Party	Council candidate	Vote	%
Mouvement lavallois - Équipe Marc Demers	Ray Khalil (X)	2,083	38.57
Parti Laval - Équipe Michel Trottier	Liane Dufour	1,390	25.74
Action Laval - Équipe Jean Claude Gobé	Nicolas Macrozonaris	1,094	20.26
Avenir Laval - Équipe Sonia Baudelot	Prabhjinder Nagra	746	13.81
Independent	Xavier Ducharme-Moussaoui	88	1.63
Laval-les-Îles District (17)
Party	Council candidate	Vote	%
Mouvement lavallois - Équipe Marc Demers	Nicholas Borne (X)	2,526	45.86
Parti Laval - Équipe Michel Trottier	François Pilon	1,138	20.66
Avenir Laval - Équipe Sonia Baudelot	Josée Trépanier	981	17.81
Action Laval - Équipe Jean Claude Gobé	Cesar Augusto Maldonado	676	12.27
Alliance des conseillers autonomes - Équipe Alain Lecompte et Cynthia Leblanc	Cynthia Leblanc	187	3.40
L'Orée-des-Bois District (18)
Party	Council candidate	Vote	%
Mouvement lavallois - Équipe Marc Demers	Yannick Langlois	2,508	47.55
Parti Laval - Équipe Michel Trottier	Grégoire Bergeron	1,171	22.20
Action Laval - Équipe Jean Claude Gobé	Kathy Barrette	817	15.49
Avenir Laval - Équipe Sonia Baudelot	Yassine Tobdji	658	12.48
Alliance des conseillers autonomes - Équipe Alain Lecompte et Cynthia Leblanc	Allison Rodrigues	120	2.28
Marc-Aurèle-Fortin District (19)
Party	Council candidate	Vote	%
Mouvement lavallois - Équipe Marc Demers	Gilbert Dumas (X)	2,837	45.39
Parti Laval - Équipe Michel Trottier	Nancy Cabana	1,916	30.66
Avenir Laval - Équipe Sonia Baudelot	Khalid Ould El Gadia	724	11.58
Action Laval - Équipe Jean Claude Gobé	Bianca Bozsodi	689	11.02
Alliance des conseillers autonomes - Équipe Alain Lecompte et Cynthia Leblanc	Ricardo De Oliva	84	1.34
Fabreville District (20)
Party	Council candidate	Vote	%
Parti Laval - Équipe Michel Trottier	Claude Larochelle	3,256	47.14
Mouvement lavallois - Équipe Marc Demers	Ziaad Ghantous	1,835	26.57
Action Laval - Équipe Jean Claude Gobé	Robert Bordeleau	1,210	17.52
Avenir Laval - Équipe Sonia Baudelot	Assia Karaiskos	606	8.77
Sainte-Rose District (21)
Party	Council candidate	Vote	%
Mouvement lavallois - Équipe Marc Demers	Virginie Dufour (X)	3,431	50.81
Parti Laval - Équipe Michel Trottier	Andréanne Fiola	1,907	28.24
Action Laval - Équipe Jean Claude Gobé	Marie-Louise Beauchamp	728	10.78
Avenir Laval - Équipe Sonia Baudelot	Hassan Khoder	687	10.17

==== By-election ====
A by-election was held in the Marc-Aurèle-Fortin District District on November 24, 2019. The results were as follows:

Party	Candidate	Vote	%
Parti Laval - Équipe Michel Trottier	Michel Trottier	1,501	35.28
Mouvement lavallois - Équipe Marc Demers	Bruny Surin	1,419	33.36
Action Laval	Francine Leblanc	1,251	29.41
Progrès Laval	Gabriel Vellone	83	1.95
Total valid votes		4,254	25.78

== Lanaudière ==
=== Charlemagne ===
Party	Mayoral candidate	Vote	%
Équipe Charlemagne	Normand Grenier (X)	Acclaimed	

=== Joliette ===
Mayoral candidate	Vote	%
Alain Beaudry (X)	Acclaimed	

=== L'Assomption ===
Party	Mayoral candidate	Vote	%
Vision L'Assomption - équipe Sébastien Nadeau	Sébastien Nadeau	4,005	58.94
Independent	Jean Raynault	1,192	17.54
ADN L'Assomption	Valérie Couturier	1,087	16.00
Voix des citoyens avec Sylvie Langlois Brouillette	Sylvie Langlois Brouillette	511	7.52
Total valid votes		6,795	40.47

=== Lavaltrie ===
Mayoral candidate	Vote	%
Christian Goulet	2,243	56.46
Lynda Pelletier	1,730	43.54

=== Mascouche ===
==== Mayor ====
Party	Mayoral candidate	Vote	%
Vision démocratique de Mascouche - Équipe Guillaume Tremblay	Guillaume Tremblay (X)	9,914	75.72
Independent	François Collin	2,269	17.33
Independent	Line Lavallée	910	6.95
Total valid votes		13,093	37.69

==== Mascouche City Council ====
Louis-Hébert District (1)
Party	Council candidate	Vote	%
Vision démocratique de Mascouche - Équipe Guillaume Tremblay	Roger Côté (X)	Acclaimed	
Laurier District (2)
Party	Council candidate	Vote	%
Vision démocratique de Mascouche - Équipe Guillaume Tremblay	Eugène Jolicoeur (X)	1,214	62.97
Independent	Denis Nadeau	714	37.03
Le Gardeur District (3)
Party	Council candidate	Vote	%
Vision démocratique de Mascouche - Équipe Guillaume Tremblay	Louise Forest (X)	Acclaimed	
La Vérendrye District (4)
Party	Council candidate	Vote	%
Vision démocratique de Mascouche - Équipe Guillaume Tremblay	Stéphane Handfield (X)	Acclaimed	
Du Côteau District (5)
Party	Council candidate	Vote	%
Vision démocratique de Mascouche - Équipe Guillaume Tremblay	Bertrand Lefebvre (X)	1,531	79.82
Independent	Fabienne Robert	387	20.18
Des Hauts-Bois District (6)
Party	Council candidate	Vote	%
Vision démocratique de Mascouche - Équipe Guillaume Tremblay	Don Monahan (X)	Acclaimed	
Du Rucher District (7)
Party	Council candidate	Vote	%
Vision démocratique de Mascouche - Équipe Guillaume Tremblay	Anny Mailloux (X)	Acclaimed	
Du Manoir District (8)
Party	Council candidate	Vote	%
Vision démocratique de Mascouche - Équipe Guillaume Tremblay	Gabriel Michaud (X)	Acclaimed	

=== Notre-Dame-des-Prairies ===
Mayoral candidate	Vote	%
Suzanne Dauphin	2,512	68.35
Pierre Lajeunesse	1,163	31.65

=== Rawdon ===
Party	Mayoral candidate	Vote	%
Équipe Guilbault - Parti Rawdonnois	Bruno Guilbault (X)	2,309	73.35
Independent	Jean-Yves St-Denis	839	26.65
Total valid votes		3,148	33.75

=== Repentigny ===
==== Mayor ====
Party	Mayoral candidate	Vote	%
Équipe Deschamps	Chantal Deschamps (X)	15,241	53.16
Parti Démocratique de Repentigny-Le Gardeur	Bruno Villeneuve	13,430	46.84
Total valid votes		28,671	44.80

==== Repentigny City Council ====
District 1
Party	Council candidate	Vote	%
Équipe Deschamps	Josée Mailhot	1,618	65.35
Parti Démocratique de Repentigny-Le Gardeur	Hawa Sylla	858	34.65
District 2
Party	Council candidate	Vote	%
Équipe Deschamps	Georges Robinson (X)	1,158	54.52
Parti Démocratique de Repentigny-Le Gardeur	Olivier Lanctôt	966	45.48
District 3
Party	Council candidate	Vote	%
Équipe Deschamps	Denyse Peltier (X)	1,396	67.87
Parti Démocratique de Repentigny-Le Gardeur	Hassana Belkebir	661	32.13
District 4
Party	Council candidate	Vote	%
Équipe Deschamps	Cécile Hénault (X)	1,465	63.50
Parti Démocratique de Repentigny-Le Gardeur	Luc Rhéaume	842	36.50
District 5
Party	Council candidate	Vote	%
Équipe Deschamps	Éric Chartré (X)	1,321	53.90
Parti Démocratique de Repentigny-Le Gardeur	Thina Nguyen	1,130	46.10
District 6
Party	Council candidate	Vote	%
Équipe Deschamps	Sylvain Benoit (X)	1,540	57.89
Parti Démocratique de Repentigny-Le Gardeur	Annick Gauthier	1,120	42.11
District 7
Party	Council candidate	Vote	%
Équipe Deschamps	Raymond Hénault (X)	1,316	51.81
Parti Démocratique de Repentigny-Le Gardeur	Dominique Richard	1,224	48.19
District 8
Party	Council candidate	Vote	%
Parti Démocratique de Repentigny-Le Gardeur	Jennifer Robillard	1,034	50.17
Équipe Deschamps	Normand Venne (X)	1,027	49.83
District 9
Party	Council candidate	Vote	%
Parti Démocratique de Repentigny-Le Gardeur	Jean Langlois	1,476	51.39
Équipe Deschamps	Benoit Delisle	1,396	48.61
District 10
Party	Council candidate	Vote	%
Parti Démocratique de Repentigny-Le Gardeur	Kevin Buteau	1,788	74.53
Équipe Deschamps	Danielle Blais	611	25.47
District 11
Party	Council candidate	Vote	%
Parti Démocratique de Repentigny-Le Gardeur	Chantal Routhier	1,419	57.54
Équipe Deschamps	Francine Payer (X)	1,047	42.46
District 12
Party	Council candidate	Vote	%
Parti Démocratique de Repentigny-Le Gardeur	Stéphane Machabée	1,235	54.67
Équipe Deschamps	Normand Urbain (X)	1,024	45.33

=== Saint-Calixte ===
Mayoral candidate	Vote	%
Michel Jasmin	Acclaimed	

=== Saint-Charles-Borromée ===
Mayoral candidate	Vote	%
Robert Bibeau	Acclaimed	

=== Sainte-Julienne ===
Party	Mayoral candidate	Vote	%
Équipe Jean-Pierre Charron - L'avenir de Sainte-Julienne	Jeann-Pierre Charron	1,739	41.02
Équipe Marcel Jetté	Marcel Jetté (X)	1,386	32.70
Alliance civique de Sainte-Julienne	Michel Marchand	769	18.14
Independent	Normand Martineau	345	8.14

=== Saint-Félix-de-Valois ===
Mayoral candidate	Vote	%
Audrey Boisjoly	1,293	53.90
Michel L'Ecuyer	576	24.01
Gaétan Desrosiers	403	16.80
Benoit Fontaine	127	5.29

=== Saint-Lin-Laurentides ===
Party	Mayoral candidate	Vote	%
Avenir citoyen - Équipe Patrick Massé	Patrick Massé (X)	Acclaimed	

=== Saint-Paul ===
Mayoral candidate	Vote	%
Alain Bellemare (X)	Acclaimed	

=== Saint-Roch-de-l'Achigan ===
Mayoral candidate	Vote	%
Yves Prud'Homme	Acclaimed	

=== Terrebonne ===
==== Mayor ====
Party	Mayoral candidate	Vote	%
Alliance démocratique Terrebonne - Equipe Plante pour du changement	Marc-André Plante	13,883	42.03
Générations Terrebonne	Stéphane Berthe (X)	10,371	31.40
Nouvel Élan Terrebonne - Équipe Valérie Quevillon	Valérie Quevillon	8,193	24.80
Action Terrebonne	Antoine Hanachian	585	1.77
Total valid votes		33,032	40.28

==== Terrebonne City Council ====
District 1
Party	Council candidate	Vote	%
Alliance démocratique Terrebonne - Equipe Plante pour du changement	Brigitte Villeneuve (X)	962	58.06
Nouvel Élan Terrebonne - Équipe Valérie Quevillon	Kim Lecavalier	314	18.95
Générations Terrebonne	Alain Gravel	269	16.23
Independent	Hélène Michaud	112	6.76
District 2
Party	Council candidate	Vote	%
Alliance démocratique Terrebonne - Equipe Plante pour du changement	Nathalie Bellavance (X)	1,083	54.84
Générations Terrebonne	Patrick Simard	351	17.77
Nouvel Élan Terrebonne - Équipe Valérie Quevillon	Nathalie Lavigne	295	14.94
Independent	Gabriel Gauthier	246	12.46
District 3
Party	Council candidate	Vote	%
Alliance démocratique Terrebonne - Equipe Plante pour du changement	Dany St-Pierre	891	47.77
Générations Terrebonne	Johanne Morin	363	19.46
Independent	Eve Duhamel	344	18.45
Nouvel Élan Terrebonne - Équipe Valérie Quevillon	Simon Marentette	267	14.32
District 4
Party	Council candidate	Vote	%
Alliance démocratique Terrebonne - Equipe Plante pour du changement	Réal Leclerc (X)	1,059	51.84
Nouvel Élan Terrebonne - Équipe Valérie Quevillon	Caroline Anctil	492	24.08
Générations Terrebonne	Josianne Laquerre	492	24.08
District 5
Party	Council candidate	Vote	%
Alliance démocratique Terrebonne - Equipe Plante pour du changement	Serge Gagnon (X)	1,024	53.75
Générations Terrebonne	Carole Robitaille	538	28.24
Nouvel Élan Terrebonne - Équipe Valérie Quevillon	Steve Veilleux	343	18.01
District 6
Party	Council candidate	Vote	%
Alliance démocratique Terrebonne - Equipe Plante pour du changement	Éric Fortin	686	35.73
Générations Terrebonne	Isabelle Patenaude	613	31.93
Nouvel Élan Terrebonne - Équipe Valérie Quevillon	Hugo Parent	445	23.18
Independent	Walter Hébert	143	7.45
Action Terrebonne	Michèle Parsons	33	1.72
District 7
Party	Council candidate	Vote	%
Alliance démocratique Terrebonne - Equipe Plante pour du changement	Yan Gauthier-Maisonneuve	676	33.55
Nouvel Élan Terrebonne - Équipe Valérie Quevillon	Manon Perreault	661	32.80
Générations Terrebonne	Paul Asselin (X)	593	29.43
Action Terrebonne	David Moïse	85	4.22
District 8
Party	Council candidate	Vote	%
Alliance démocratique Terrebonne - Equipe Plante pour du changement	Caroline Desbiens	1,246	49.00
Générations Terrebonne	Marie-Josée Beaupré (X)	660	25.95
Nouvel Élan Terrebonne - Équipe Valérie Quevillon	Nancy Gaudreault	637	25.05
District 9
Party	Council candidate	Vote	%
Alliance démocratique Terrebonne - Equipe Plante pour du changement	Simon Paquin	1,038	45.93
Générations Terrebonne	Audrey Lachance	677	29.96
Nouvel Élan Terrebonne - Équipe Valérie Quevillon	Franco Gentili	465	20.58
Independent	Guillaume Ledoux	80	3.54
District 10
Party	Council candidate	Vote	%
Nouvel Élan Terrebonne - Équipe Valérie Quevillon	Robert Morin	605	33.26
Générations Terrebonne	Chantal Lapierre	540	29.69
Alliance démocratique Terrebonne - Equipe Plante pour du changement	Réal Brassard	516	28.37
Independent	Jean-Guy Toupin	158	8.69
District 11
Party	Council candidate	Vote	%
Alliance démocratique Terrebonne - Equipe Plante pour du changement	Nathalie Ricard	766	40.49
Générations Terrebonne	Nicolas Bucci	736	38.90
Nouvel Élan Terrebonne - Équipe Valérie Quevillon	Rafael Andres Rivas	390	20.61
District 12
Party	Council candidate	Vote	%
Générations Terrebonne	André Fontaine (X)	919	50.61
Alliance démocratique Terrebonne - Equipe Plante pour du changement	Line Dussault	625	34.42
Nouvel Élan Terrebonne - Équipe Valérie Quevillon	Pierre-Alexandre Bugeaud	272	14.98
District 13
Party	Council candidate	Vote	%
Alliance démocratique Terrebonne - Equipe Plante pour du changement	Jacques Demers	1,092	47.58
Générations Terrebonne	Lucas Galarneau	937	40.83
Nouvel Élan Terrebonne - Équipe Valérie Quevillon	Laurence Pilon-Labonté	266	11.59
District 14
Party	Council candidate	Vote	%
Générations Terrebonne	Robert Brisebois	785	36.39
Alliance démocratique Terrebonne - Equipe Plante pour du changement	Claire Messier (X)	750	34.77
Nouvel Élan Terrebonne - Équipe Valérie Quevillon	Julie Hamel	622	28.84
District 15
Party	Council candidate	Vote	%
Générations Terrebonne	Nathalie Lepage	764	34.20*
Alliance démocratique Terrebonne - Equipe Plante pour du changement	Alain De Choinière	763	34.15*
Nouvel Élan Terrebonne - Équipe Valérie Quevillon	Michel Corbeil	627	28.07
Action Terrebonne	Bréviol Dorceus	80	3.58
District 16
Party	Council candidate	Vote	%
Générations Terrebonne	Marc-André Michaud	1,684	65.17
Alliance démocratique Terrebonne - Equipe Plante pour du changement	Éric Forget	568	21.98
Nouvel Élan Terrebonne - Équipe Valérie Quevillon	André Hachey	332	12.85

* The initial count was tied; after a re-count, Lepage was declared the winner by one vote.

== Laurentides ==
=== Blainville ===
==== Mayor ====
Party	Mayoral candidate	Vote	%
Vrai Blainville - Équipe Perreault	Richard Perreault (X)	12,179	75.30
Mouvement Blainville - Équipe Florent Gravel	Florent Gravel	3,995	24.70
Total valid votes		16,174	38.57

==== Blainville City Council ====
Fontainebleau District (1)
Party	Council candidate	Vote	%
Vrai Blainville - Équipe Perreault	Liza Poulin (X)	1,131	67.56
Mouvement Blainville - Équipe Florent Gravel	Cindy-Ann Bourdeau	543	32.44
de la Côte-Saint-Louis District (2)
Party	Council candidate	Vote	%
Vrai Blainville - Équipe Perreault	Stéphane Dufour	977	75.91
Mouvement Blainville - Équipe Florent Gravel	Daniel Viens	310	24.09
Saint-Rédempteur District (3)
Party	Council candidate	Vote	%
Vrai Blainville - Équipe Perreault	Serge Paquette (X)	1,126	72.88
Mouvement Blainville - Équipe Florent Gravel	Normand Godin	419	27.12
du Plan-Bouchard District (4)
Party	Council candidate	Vote	%
Vrai Blainville - Équipe Perreault	Guy Frigon (X)	1,448	72.55
Mouvement Blainville - Équipe Florent Gravel	Marc-André Gravel	548	27.45
Notre-Dame-de-l'Assomption District (5)
Party	Council candidate	Vote	%
Vrai Blainville - Équipe Perreault	Jean-François Pinard	1,118	75.75
Mouvement Blainville - Équipe Florent Gravel	Richard Labelle	358	24.25
Chante-Bois District (6)
Party	Council candidate	Vote	%
Vrai Blainville - Équipe Perreault	Nicole Ruel (X)	1,273	76.69
Mouvement Blainville - Équipe Florent Gravel	Alain Legros	387	23.31
des Hirondelles District (7)
Party	Council candidate	Vote	%
Vrai Blainville - Équipe Perreault	Patrick Marineau (X)	1,303	79.79
Mouvement Blainville - Équipe Florent Gravel	Alexandre Daoust	330	20.21
Alençon District (8)
Party	Council candidate	Vote	%
Vrai Blainville - Équipe Perreault	Stéphane Bertrand	1,207	84.11
Mouvement Blainville - Équipe Florent Gravel	Hugo-Alexandre Léveillé	228	15.89
de la Renaissance District (9)
Party	Council candidate	Vote	%
Vrai Blainville - Équipe Perreault	Michèle Murray	1,239	76.39
Mouvement Blainville - Équipe Florent Gravel	Stéphanie Rahme	383	23.61
du Blainvillier District (10)
Party	Council candidate	Vote	%
Vrai Blainville - Équipe Perreault	Marie-Claude Collin (X)	1,373	73.34
Mouvement Blainville - Équipe Florent Gravel	Jean-Louis Saurel	499	26.66

=== Boisbriand ===
Party	Mayoral candidate	Vote	%
Ralliement des citoyens de Boisbriand	Marlene Cordato (X)	5,839	62.39
Independent	Denis Hébert	2,595	27.73
Action citoyenne de Boisbriand - Équipe Drapeau	Martin Drapeau	925	9.88
Total valid votes		9,359	47.82

=== Bois-des-Filion ===
Party	Mayoral candidate	Vote	%
Equipe Blanchette-Projet Filionois	Gilles Blanchette	Acclaimed	

=== Brownsburg-Chatham ===
Mayoral candidate	Vote	%
Catherine Trickey (X)	614	23.47
Gilles Galarneau	574	21.94
Pierre Leclerc	453	17.32
Martin Charron	415	15.86
Daniel Massie	359	13.72
Gilles Leduc	201	7.68

=== Deux-Montagnes ===
Party	Mayoral candidate	Vote	%
Deux-Montagnes Autrement - Équipe Denis Martin	Denis Martin (X)	4,098	74.25
Équipe Isabelle Daviau	Isabelle Daviau	1,167	21.15
Mouvement Citoyen Deux-Montagnes / Deux-Montagnes Citizen Movement	Didier Maletto-Rock	254	4.60
Total valid votes		5,519	41.85

=== Lachute ===
Mayoral candidate	Vote	%
Carl Péloquin (X)	1,989	38.55
Marcelle Lafleur Louis-Seize	1,345	26.07
Daniel Mayer	1,320	25.58
Mario Beaudin	506	9.81

=== Lorraine ===
Party	Mayoral candidate	Vote	%
Équipe Comtois	Jean Comtois	2,070	52.89
Équipe Dionne	Lynn Dionne (X)	1,844	47.11

=== Mirabel ===
==== Mayor ====
Party	Mayoral candidate	Vote	%
Action Mirabel - Équipe Bouchard	Jean Bouchard (X)	10,210	70.52
Mouvement citoyen Mirabel - Équipe Meloche	Pierre-Paul Meloche	3,994	27.58
Renouveau Mirabel	René Plouffe	275	1.90
Total valid votes		14,479	37.86

==== Mirabel City Council ====
District 1
Party	Council candidate	Vote	%
Action Mirabel - Équipe Bouchard	Michel Lauzon (X)	1,128	63.19
Mouvement citoyen Mirabel - Équipe Meloche	Annie Vanden Abeele	657	36.81
District 2
Party	Council candidate	Vote	%
Action Mirabel - Équipe Bouchard	Guylaine Coursol (X)	1,295	79.20
Mouvement citoyen Mirabel - Équipe Meloche	Yannick Véronneau	340	20.80
District 3
Party	Council candidate	Vote	%
Action Mirabel - Équipe Bouchard	Robert Charron	975	58.00
Mouvement citoyen Mirabel - Équipe Meloche	David Marra-Hurtubise (X)	665	39.56
Renouveau Mirabel	Gabrielle Losson	41	2.44
District 4
Party	Council candidate	Vote	%
Action Mirabel - Équipe Bouchard	François Bélanger (X)	1,352	74.86
Mouvement citoyen Mirabel - Équipe Meloche	René Vachon	397	21.98
Independent	Philippe-Olivier Belcourt	57	3.16
District 5
Party	Council candidate	Vote	%
Action Mirabel - Équipe Bouchard	Patrick Charbonneau (X)	1,459	70.28
Mouvement citoyen Mirabel - Équipe Meloche	Mario Legault	542	26.11
Independent	Liette Dandurand	75	3.61
District 6
Party	Council candidate	Vote	%
Action Mirabel - Équipe Bouchard	Isabelle Gauthier	1,144	59.03
Mouvement citoyen Mirabel - Équipe Meloche	Réal Brière	794	40.97
District 7
Party	Council candidate	Vote	%
Action Mirabel - Équipe Bouchard	Francine Charles (X)	1,406	79.03
Mouvement citoyen Mirabel - Équipe Meloche	Corinne Guimont	373	20.97
District 8
Party	Council candidate	Vote	%
Action Mirabel - Équipe Bouchard	Marc Laurin	1,167	67.73
Mouvement citoyen Mirabel - Équipe Meloche	Haïdée Ouellet	556	32.27

=== Mont-Laurier ===
Mayoral candidate	Vote	%
Daniel Bourdon	Acclaimed	

=== Mont-Tremblant ===
Party	Mayoral candidate	Vote	%
Équipe Brisebois	Luc Brisebois (X)	Acclaimed	

=== Pointe-Calumet ===
Party	Mayoral candidate	Vote	%
Équipe Sonia Fontaine	Sonia Fontaine	1,058	54.62
Independent	Denis Gravel (X)	879	45.38

=== Prévost ===
Party	Mayoral candidate	Vote	%
Renouveau prévostois avec Paul Germain	Paul Germain	3,290	65.25
Équipe Nicole Durand	Nicole Durand	1,752	34.75
Total valid votes		5,042	50.24

=== Rosemère ===
Party	Mayoral candidate	Vote	%
Équipe innovaction plus Team - Rosemère	Eric Westram	3,413	63.90
Équipe Leduc / Leduc Team	Madeleine Leduc (X)	1,519	28.44
Independent	Patrick De Geyter	409	7.66
Total valid votes		5,341	49.72

=== Saint-Colomban ===
Party	Mayoral candidate	Vote	%
Ensemble Saint-Colomban	Xavier-Antoine Lalande	2,896	54.06
Option citoyenne - Équipe Jean Dumais	Jean Dumais (X)	1,271	23.73
Avenir Saint-Colomban	Johanne Tardy	1,190	22.21
Total valid votes		5,357	45.93

=== Sainte-Adèle ===
Party	Mayoral candidate	Vote	%
Independent	Nadine Brière	2,530	58.92
Parti Solutions - Équipe Robert Milot	Robert Milot (X)	1,499	34.91
Independent	André Lavallée	145	3.38
Independent	Gilles Bellerose	120	2.79
Total valid votes		4,294	39.39

=== Sainte-Agathe-des-Monts ===
Party	Mayoral candidate	Vote	%
Équipe Denis Chalifoux	Denis Chalifoux (X)	2,334	56.80
Parti du renouveau agathois – Équipe Jean-François Blondin	Jean-François Blondin	1,775	43.20
Total valid votes		4,109	46.16

=== Sainte-Anne-des-Plaines ===
Party	Mayoral candidate	Vote	%
Parti Vision Action	Guy Charbonneau (X)	Acclaimed	

=== Sainte-Marthe-sur-le-Lac ===
Party	Mayoral candidate	Vote	%
Nouvelle Option - Équipe Paulus	Sonia Paulus (X)	3,545	72.49
Independent	Louis Nadeau	1,345	27.51
Total valid votes		4,890	37.54

=== Sainte-Sophie ===
Party	Mayoral candidate	Vote	%
Action Sainte-Sophie	Louise Gallant (X)	Acclaimed	

=== Sainte-Thérèse ===
Party	Mayoral candidate	Vote	%
Parti Municipal Énergie avec Sylvie S	Sylvie Surprenant (X)	4,296	54.06
Vision Sainte-Thérèse - Équipe Gauvreau	René Gauvreau	3,651	45.94
Total valid votes		7,947	37.83

=== Saint-Eustache ===
==== Mayor ====
Party	Mayoral candidate	Vote	%
Option Saint-Eustache - Équipe Pierre Charron	Pierre Charron (X)	10,036	65.22
Renouveau Saint-Eustache - Équipe Desmarais	Julie Desmarais	3,844	24.98
Accès Saint-Eustache	Robert St-Germain	1,509	9.81
Total valid votes		15,389	45.34

==== Saint-Eustache City Council ====
Vieux-Saint-Eustache District (1)
Party	Council candidate	Vote	%
Option Saint-Eustache - Équipe Pierre Charron	Michèle Labelle (X)	676	54.74
Accès Saint-Eustache	Denis Paré	358	28.99
Renouveau Saint-Eustache - Équipe Desmarais	Anne Marie Cudney	201	16.28
du Carrefour District (2)
Party	Council candidate	Vote	%
Option Saint-Eustache - Équipe Pierre Charron	Sylvie Mallette (X)	618	45.74
Independent	André Biard (X)	512	37.90
Renouveau Saint-Eustache - Équipe Desmarais	Marie-Andrée Hinse	221	16.36
de la Rivière-Nord District (3)
Party	Council candidate	Vote	%
Option Saint-Eustache - Équipe Pierre Charron	Patrice Paquette (X)	1,440	81.08
Renouveau Saint-Eustache - Équipe Desmarais	Dominique Groleau	199	11.20
Accès Saint-Eustache	Nathalie Doucet	137	7.71
des Érables District (4)
Party	Council candidate	Vote	%
Option Saint-Eustache - Équipe Pierre Charron	Janique-Aimée Danis (X)	1,187	63.10
Renouveau Saint-Eustache - Équipe Desmarais	François Lavallée	449	23.87
Accès Saint-Eustache	Sylvie Godin	245	13.02
du Clair-Matin District (5)
Party	Council candidate	Vote	%
Option Saint-Eustache - Équipe Pierre Charron	Marc Lamarre (X)	1,163	73.47
Renouveau Saint-Eustache - Équipe Desmarais	Hugo Bergeron	343	21.67
Accès Saint-Eustache	Brigide Gauthier	77	4.86
de la Seigneurie District (6)
Party	Council candidate	Vote	%
Option Saint-Eustache - Équipe Pierre Charron	Isabelle Mattioli	926	64.26
Renouveau Saint-Eustache - Équipe Desmarais	Mario Mainville	515	35.74
des Moissons District (7)
Party	Council candidate	Vote	%
Option Saint-Eustache - Équipe Pierre Charron	Isabelle Lefebvre (X)	949	60.87
Independent	Daniel Davidson	328	21.04
Renouveau Saint-Eustache - Équipe Desmarais	Jean-Pierre Morelli	166	10.65
Accès Saint-Eustache	Bernard Grondin	116	7.44
des Îles District (8)
Party	Council candidate	Vote	%
Option Saint-Eustache - Équipe Pierre Charron	Raymond Tessier (X)	1,426	85.24
Renouveau Saint-Eustache - Équipe Desmarais	Daniel Belanger	151	9.03
Accès Saint-Eustache	Véronique Dubeau	96	5.74
Plateau-des-Chênes District (9)
Party	Council candidate	Vote	%
Option Saint-Eustache - Équipe Pierre Charron	Nicole Carignan-Lefebvre (X)	941	64.10
Renouveau Saint-Eustache - Équipe Desmarais	Nicolas Toupin	385	26.23
Accès Saint-Eustache	Robert Laurin	142	9.67
des Jardins District (10)
Party	Council candidate	Vote	%
Option Saint-Eustache - Équipe Pierre Charron	Yves Roy (X)	809	54.22
Accès Saint-Eustache	Paul Suriol	400	26.81
Renouveau Saint-Eustache - Équipe Desmarais	Nathalie Pelletier	283	18.97

=== Saint-Hippolyte ===
Party	Mayoral candidate	Vote	%
Équipe Bruno Laroche	Bruno Laroche (X)	2,219	83.36
Équipe Rousseau	Gilles Rousseau	443	16.64

=== Saint-Jérôme ===
==== Mayor ====
Party	Mayoral candidate	Vote	%
Équipe Stéphane Maher - Vision Saint-Jérôme	Stéphane Maher (X)	Acclaimed	

==== Saint-Jérôme City Council ====
District 1
Party	Council candidate	Vote	%
Équipe Stéphane Maher - Vision Saint-Jérôme	Benoit Beaulieu (X)	Acclaimed	
District 2
Party	Council candidate	Vote	%
Équipe Stéphane Maher - Vision Saint-Jérôme	Mylène Laframboise	765	61.94
Independent	Colette Thibault (X)	470	38.06
District 3
Party	Council candidate	Vote	%
Équipe Stéphane Maher - Vision Saint-Jérôme	François Poirier (X)	690	76.24
Independent	Ghislain Mireault	215	23.76
District 4
Party	Council candidate	Vote	%
Équipe Stéphane Maher - Vision Saint-Jérôme	Éric Bak	667	69.62
Independent	Michel Brière	287	30.08
District 5
Party	Council candidate	Vote	%
Équipe Stéphane Maher - Vision Saint-Jérôme	Bernard Bougie (X)	Acclaimed	
District 6
Party	Council candidate	Vote	%
Équipe Stéphane Maher - Vision Saint-Jérôme	Benoit Delage (X)	Acclaimed	
District 7
Party	Council candidate	Vote	%
Équipe Stéphane Maher - Vision Saint-Jérôme	Chantale Lambert	Acclaimed	
District 8
Party	Council candidate	Vote	%
Équipe Stéphane Maher - Vision Saint-Jérôme	Johanne Dicaire (X)	Acclaimed	
District 9
Party	Council candidate	Vote	%
Équipe Stéphane Maher - Vision Saint-Jérôme	Sophie St-Gelais	Acclaimed	
District 10
Party	Council candidate	Vote	%
Équipe Stéphane Maher - Vision Saint-Jérôme	Janice Bélair Rolland	791	79.90
Independent	Real Frechette	199	20.10
District 11
Party	Council candidate	Vote	%
Équipe Stéphane Maher - Vision Saint-Jérôme	Gilles Robert (X)	1,041	69.87
Independent	Michael Njong	449	30.13
District 12
Party	Council candidate	Vote	%
Équipe Stéphane Maher - Vision Saint-Jérôme	Nathalie Lasalle (X)	828	76.38
Independent	Marcel Mireault	256	23.62

=== Saint-Joseph-du-Lac ===
Party	Mayoral candidate	Vote	%
Équipe Benoit Proulx	Benoit Proulx (X)	1,580	65.32
Équipe Alain Théoret	Alain Théoret	839	34.68

=== Saint-Sauveur ===
Party	Mayoral candidate	Vote	%
Équipe Jacques Gariépy	Jacques Gariépy (X)	1,654	44.96
Parti sauverois - Équipe Luc Leblanc	Luc Leblanc	1,217	33.08
Comité avenir Pelletier	Yvon Pelletier	720	19.57
Parti libre Saint-Sauveur	Michel Leclerc	88	2.39
Total valid votes		3,679	41.10

== Montérégie ==
=== Acton Vale ===
Mayoral candidate	Vote	%
Éric Charbonneau (X)	Acclaimed	

=== Beauharnois ===
Party	Mayoral candidate	Vote	%
Independent	Bruno Tremblay	2,858	54.49
Équipe Bob Guay	Bob Guay	1,479	28.20
Independent	André Filion	908	17.31
Total valid votes		5,245	50.09

=== Beloeil ===
Party	Mayoral candidate	Vote	%
Équipe Diane Lavoie - Beloeil gagnant	Diane Lavoie (X)	4,398	59.00
Parti des citoyens de Beloeil - Équipe Rémi Landry	Rémi Landry	3,056	41.00
Total valid votes		7,454	44.10

=== Boucherville ===
==== Mayor ====
Party	Mayoral candidate	Vote	%
Équipe Jean Martel - Option Citoyens Citoyennes	Jean Martel (X)	13,715	89.55
Independent	Monique Reeves	1,601	10.45
Total valid votes		15,316	47.70

==== Boucherville City Council ====
Marie-Victorin District (1)
Party	Council candidate	Vote	%
Équipe Jean Martel - Option Citoyens Citoyennes	Isabelle Bleau	1,389	58.66
Independent	Yan Savaria Laquerre (X)	979	41.34
Rivière-aux-Pins District (2)
Party	Council candidate	Vote	%
Équipe Jean Martel - Option Citoyens Citoyennes	Raouf Absi (X)	1,460	58.93
Independent	Olivier Tremblay	556	26.25
Independent	Stéphane Laurence	102	4.82
Des Découvreurs District (3)
Party	Council candidate	Vote	%
Équipe Jean Martel - Option Citoyens Citoyennes	Josée Bissonnette (X)	Acclaimed	
Harmonie District (4)
Party	Council candidate	Vote	%
Équipe Jean Martel - Option Citoyens Citoyennes	Anne Barabé (X)	1,914	86.72
Independent	Frédérick Bastarache Ouellette	293	13.28
La Seigneurie District (5)
Party	Council candidate	Vote	%
Équipe Jean Martel - Option Citoyens Citoyennes	François Desmarais	1,472	84.99
Independent	Michel Sved	260	15.01
Saint-Louis District (6)
Party	Council candidate	Vote	%
Équipe Jean Martel - Option Citoyens Citoyennes	Magalie Queval (X)	Acclaimed	
De Normandie District (7)
Party	Council candidate	Vote	%
Équipe Jean Martel - Option Citoyens Citoyennes	Jacqueline Boubane (X)	1,637	90.09
Independent	Normand Gagnon	180	9.91
Le Boisé District (8)
Party	Council candidate	Vote	%
Équipe Jean Martel - Option Citoyens Citoyennes	Lise Roy (X)	1,387	83.55
Independent	Michel Peccia	273	16.45

=== Bromont ===
Mayoral candidate	Vote	%
Louis Villeneuve	1,865	43.36
Diane Perron	1,234	28.69
Yvon Carrier	1,202	27.96

=== Brossard ===
==== Mayor ====
Party	Mayoral candidate	Vote	%
Brossard Ensemble - Équipe Doreen Assaad	Doreen Assaad	8,990	39.17
Independent	Hoang Mai	5,922	25.80
Priorité Brossard - Équipe Paul Leduc	Paul Leduc (X)	5,049	22.00
Renouveau Brossard Revival - Équipe Jean-Marc Pelletier	Jean-Marc Pelletier	2,991	13.03
Total valid votes		22,952	37.69

==== Brossard City Council ====
District 1
Party	Council candidate	Vote	%
Brossard Ensemble - Équipe Doreen Assaad	Christian Gaudette	1,101	57.28
Priorité Brossard - Équipe Paul Leduc	Tony Ghannamy	577	30.02
Renouveau Brossard Revival - Équipe Jean-Marc Pelletier	Kim Araman	244	12.70
District 2
Party	Council candidate	Vote	%
Brossard Ensemble - Équipe Doreen Assaad	Michel Gervais	1,077	41.97
Priorité Brossard - Équipe Paul Leduc	Pierre O'Donoughue (X)	675	26.31
Independent	Diane Girard	484	18.86
Renouveau Brossard Revival - Équipe Jean-Marc Pelletier	Gilbert Lizotte	330	12.86
District 3
Party	Council candidate	Vote	%
Brossard Ensemble - Équipe Doreen Assaad	Monique Gagné	732	48.03
Priorité Brossard - Équipe Paul Leduc	Francine Raymond (X)	473	31.04
Renouveau Brossard Revival - Équipe Jean-Marc Pelletier	Nathalie Vere-Holloway	319	20.93
District 4
Party	Council candidate	Vote	%
Brossard Ensemble - Équipe Doreen Assaad	Julie Bénard	1,269	52.55
Priorité Brossard - Équipe Paul Leduc	Serge Séguin	777	32.17
Renouveau Brossard Revival - Équipe Jean-Marc Pelletier	Mamadou Diouf	369	15.28
District 5
Party	Council candidate	Vote	%
Brossard Ensemble - Équipe Doreen Assaad	Claudio Benedetti (X)	1,536	67.37
Priorité Brossard - Équipe Paul Leduc	François Boucher	377	16.54
Renouveau Brossard Revival - Équipe Jean-Marc Pelletier	Marcel Lussier	367	16.10
District 6
Party	Council candidate	Vote	%
Brossard Ensemble - Équipe Doreen Assaad	Sophie Allard	1,811	58.33
Priorité Brossard - Équipe Paul Leduc	Alexandre Plante (X)	737	23.74
Renouveau Brossard Revival - Équipe Jean-Marc Pelletier	Georgette Saad	557	17.94
District 7
Party	Council candidate	Vote	%
Renouveau Brossard Revival - Équipe Jean-Marc Pelletier	Antoine Assaf (X)	1,152	45.75
Brossard Ensemble - Équipe Doreen Assaad	Anna-Simone Sorial	926	36.78
Priorité Brossard - Équipe Paul Leduc	Geneviève Grégoire	440	17.47
District 8
Party	Council candidate	Vote	%
Brossard Ensemble - Équipe Doreen Assaad	Pierre Jetté (X)	1,115	46.09
Priorité Brossard - Équipe Paul Leduc	Xixi Li	696	28.77
Renouveau Brossard Revival - Équipe Jean-Marc Pelletier	Robert McKoy	608	25.13
District 9
Party	Council candidate	Vote	%
Brossard Ensemble - Équipe Doreen Assaad	Michelle Jarnam Hui	825	51.95
Priorité Brossard - Équipe Paul Leduc	Anh Tuan Hoang	441	27.77
Renouveau Brossard Revival - Équipe Jean-Marc Pelletier	Jean-Paul Mouradian	322	20.28
District 10
Party	Council candidate	Vote	%
Brossard Ensemble - Équipe Doreen Assaad	Sylvie Desgroseilliers	1,263	56.26
Priorité Brossard - Équipe Paul Leduc	Daniel Lucier (X)	543	24.19
Renouveau Brossard Revival - Équipe Jean-Marc Pelletier	Nahed Hassan	439	19.55

=== Candiac ===
Party	Mayoral candidate	Vote	%
Équipe Action Candiac	Normand Dyotte (X)	Acclaimed	

=== Carignan ===
Party	Mayoral candidate	Vote	%
Pro-Citoyens - Équipe Patrick Marquès	Patrick Marquès	1,564	52.27
Avantage Citoyen - Équipe René Fournier	René Fournier (X)	1,428	47.73

=== Chambly ===
Party	Mayoral candidate	Vote	%
Action Chambly Équipe Denis Lavoie	Denis Lavoie (X)	5,429	56.21
Démocratie Chambly équipe Steeves Demers	Steeves Demers	4,229	43.79
Total valid votes		9,658	45.1

==== By-election ====
A by-election was held June 23, 2019 for mayor:

Party	Mayoral candidate	Vote	%
Démocratie Chambly	Alexandra Labbé	4,636	80.26
Independent	Marcel Bouchard	854	14.79
Independent	Fodé Kerfalla Yansané	286	4.95

=== Châteauguay ===
==== Mayor ====
Party	Mayoral candidate	Vote	%
Independent	Steve Brisebois	2,705	16.40
Vision Châteauguay - Équipe Routhier Team	Pierre-Paul Routhier (X)	7,875	47.74
Action citoyenne/Citizens' Action - Équipe Nathalie Simon	Nathalie Simon	5,915	35.86
Total valid votes		16,495	46.0

==== Châteauguay City Council ====
Lanoue District (1)
Party	Council candidate	Vote	%
Vision Châteauguay - Équipe Routhier Team	Barry Doyle (X)	1,112	52.65
Action citoyenne/Citizens' Action - Équipe Nathalie Simon	Frank Cholette	670	31.72
Independent	Anthony Boffice	330	15.63
du Filgate District (2)
Party	Council candidate	Vote	%
Vision Châteauguay - Équipe Routhier Team	Michel Enault	720	42.33
Action citoyenne/Citizens' Action - Équipe Nathalie Simon	Daniel Paillé	663	38.98
Independent	Pierre Mayer	318	18.69
Robutel District (3)
Party	Council candidate	Vote	%
Vision Châteauguay - Équipe Routhier Team	Éric Corbeil	1,181	64.50
Action citoyenne/Citizens' Action - Équipe Nathalie Simon	Michel Pinard (X)	650	35.50
Bumbray District (4)
Party	Council candidate	Vote	%
Vision Châteauguay - Équipe Routhier Team	Lucie Laberge (X)	1,436	66.75
Action citoyenne/Citizens' Action - Équipe Nathalie Simon	Charles-Olivier Patenaude	748	34.25
Salaberry District (5)
Party	Council candidate	Vote	%
Vision Châteauguay - Équipe Routhier Team	Marcel Deschamps (X)	1,043	59.84
Action citoyenne/Citizens' Action - Équipe Nathalie Simon	Guy Turcotte	614	35.23
Independent	Mohamed El Abssi	86	4.93
Lang District (6)
Party	Council candidate	Vote	%
Vision Châteauguay - Équipe Routhier Team	Mike Gendron (X)	1,740	77.71
Action citoyenne/Citizens' Action - Équipe Nathalie Simon	Yasmine Zitouni	499	22.29
Le Moyne District (7)
Party	Council candidate	Vote	%
Vision Châteauguay - Équipe Routhier Team	Éric Allard	1,353	60.62
Action citoyenne/Citizens' Action - Équipe Nathalie Simon	Marie-France Reid (X)	879	39.38
D'Youville District (8)
Party	Council candidate	Vote	%
Independent	François Le Borgne	1,051	47.95
Action citoyenne/Citizens' Action - Équipe Nathalie Simon	Alain Côté (X)	601	27.42
Vision Châteauguay - Équipe Routhier Team	Linda Bélanger	540	24.64

=== Contrecoeur ===
Mayoral candidate	Vote	%
Maud Allaire	1,424	43.94
Ronald Leclaire	1,163	35.88
Joëlle Bissonnette	654	20.18

=== Coteau-du-Lac ===
Mayoral candidate	Vote	%
Andrée Brosseau	1,176	37.24
Daniel Madore	1,000	31.67
Guy Jasmin (X)	982	31.10

=== Cowansville ===
Mayoral candidate	Vote	%
Sylvie Beauregard (X)	2,899	65.37
Corinne Labbé	917	20.68
Réjean Lehoux	444	10.01
Guy Patenaude	175	3.95

=== Delson ===
Party	Mayoral candidate	Vote	%
Alliance Delson	Christian Ouellette (X)	Acclaimed	

=== East Farnham ===
Mayoral candidate	Vote	%
Sylvie Dionne-Raymond (X)	Acclaimed	

=== Farnham ===
Mayoral candidate	Vote	%
Patrick Melchior	1,737	59.40
Josef Hüsler (X)	1,187	40.60

=== Granby ===
==== Mayor ====
Mayoral candidate	Vote	%
Pascal Bonin (X)	12,437	61.97
Yves Bélanger	7,265	36.20
Carl Bouvier	366	1.82

==== Granby City Council ====
Candidate	Vote	%
District 1
Stéphane Giard (X)	1,683	84.87
Mario Loiselle	300	15.13
District 2
Jean-Luc Nappert (X)	1,597	60.22
Ian Brochu	1,055	39.78
District 3
Julie Bourdon (X)	1,438	64.34
Réjean Chabot	442	19.78
Jean-Daniel Gilbert	355	15.88
District 4
Jocelyn Dupuis (X)	1,562	65.14
Marc Boily	836	34.86
District 5
Alain Lacasse	662	34.07
Yves Pronovost	391	20.12
Maria Romano	329	16.93
Réjean Choquet	300	15.44
Stéphane Pollender	261	13.43
District 6
Denyse Tremblay (X)	726	39.14
Bruno Junior St-Amand	687	37.04
Edith Gagnon	386	20.81
Rénald Perreault	56	3.02
District 7
Robert Riel (X)	1,153	75.46
Edgar Villamarin Bautista	375	24.54
District 8
Eric Duchesneau (X)	1,157	71.60
Sylvain Mercier	459	28.40
District 9
Robert Vincent (X)	1,169	60.20
Luc Perron	773	39.80
District 10
Catherine Baudin	638	35.29
Patrick Girard	560	30.97
Marie-Hélène Apollon	438	24.23
André Plouffe	172	9.51

=== Hudson ===
Mayoral candidate	Vote	%
Jamie Nicholls (Note: Nicholls is now known as Jae due to gender transition.)	1,788	73.64
William Nash	507	20.88
Joseph H. Eletr	133	5.48

=== Lac-Brome ===
Mayoral candidate	Vote	%
Richard Burcombe (X)	Acclaimed	

=== La Prairie ===
Party	Mayoral candidate	Vote	%
Équipe Barbara Joannette - Ensemble pour les citoyens	Barbara Joannette	2,410	32.78
Équipe Donat Serres	Donat Serres (X)	4,943	67.22
Total valid votes		7353	40.6

=== Les Cèdres ===
Mayoral candidate	Vote	%
Raymond Larouche (X)	Acclaimed	

=== Les Coteaux ===
Mayoral candidate	Vote	%
Denise Godin-Dostie (X)	784	47.57
Sylvie Joly	481	29.19
Martin Chartrand	383	23.24

=== L'Île-Perrot ===
Mayoral candidate	Vote	%
Marc Roy	1,202	41.26
Pierre Séguin (X)	1,711	58.74

=== Longueuil ===
==== Mayor ====
Party	Mayoral candidate	Vote	%
Action Longueuil - Équipe Sylvie Parent	Sylvie Parent	24,926	42.73
Longueuil citoyen - Équipe Josée Latendresse	Josée Latendresse	24,808	42.53
Option Longueuil - Équipe Sadia Groguhé	Sadia Groguhé	8,594	14.73
Total valid votes		58,328	33.1

==== Longueuil City Council ====
Fatima-du Parcours-du-Cerf District (1)
Party	Council candidate	Vote	%
Longueuil citoyen - Équipe Josée Latendresse	Steve Gagnon (X)	1,935	49.27
Action Longueuil - Équipe Sylvie Parent	Joan Hins	1,742	44.36
Option Longueuil - Équipe Sadia Groguhé	Salima Karfa	250	6.37
Boisé-du Tremblay District (2)
Party	Council candidate	Vote	%
Longueuil citoyen - Équipe Josée Latendresse	Benoît L'Ecuyer (X)	2,611	57.50
Action Longueuil - Équipe Sylvie Parent	André Junior Martel	1,541	33.94
Option Longueuil - Équipe Sadia Groguhé	Nathalie Akpa	389	8.57
Parc-Michel-Chartrand District (3)
Party	Council candidate	Vote	%
Longueuil citoyen - Équipe Josée Latendresse	Jonathan Tabarah (X)	2,332	48.60
Action Longueuil - Équipe Sylvie Parent	France Dubé	2,242	46.73
Option Longueuil - Équipe Sadia Groguhé	Louis-Pierre Gaulin	224	4.67
Antoinette-Robidoux District (4)
Party	Council candidate	Vote	%
Longueuil citoyen - Équipe Josée Latendresse	Michel Lanctôt (X)	1,158	45.01
Action Longueuil - Équipe Sylvie Parent	François Millette	1,084	42.13
Option Longueuil - Équipe Sadia Groguhé	Mivilu Kayombo	331	12.86
Georges-Dor District (5)
Party	Council candidate	Vote	%
Longueuil citoyen - Équipe Josée Latendresse	Xavier Léger (X)	1,836	47.49
Action Longueuil - Équipe Sylvie Parent	Brigitte Lépine	1,385	35.83
Option Longueuil - Équipe Sadia Groguhé	Monique Simard-Paquin	470	12.16
Independent	Marc Archambault	175	4.53
Explorateurs District (6)
Party	Council candidate	Vote	%
Action Longueuil - Équipe Sylvie Parent	Tommy Théberge (X)	1,295	43.68
Longueuil citoyen - Équipe Josée Latendresse	Stéphane Richer	1,196	40.34
Option Longueuil - Équipe Sadia Groguhé	Catherine Lovatt-Smith	474	15.99
Coteau-Rouge District (7)
Party	Council candidate	Vote	%
Action Longueuil - Équipe Sylvie Parent	Monique Bastien (X)	1,806	45.86
Longueuil citoyen - Équipe Josée Latendresse	Lyette Bouchard	1,521	38.62
Option Longueuil - Équipe Sadia Groguhé	Patricia Stasiak	611	15.52
Saint-Charles District (8)
Party	Council candidate	Vote	%
Action Longueuil - Équipe Sylvie Parent	Eric Bouchard (X)	1,801	49.64
Longueuil citoyen - Équipe Josée Latendresse	Benoît Laganière	1,373	37.84
Option Longueuil - Équipe Sadia Groguhé	Josée Riopel	345	9.51
Independent	Paul-M. Saindon	66	1.82
Independent	Réjean Gosselin	43	1.19
LeMoyne-de Jacques-Cartier District (9)
Party	Council candidate	Vote	%
Action Longueuil - Équipe Sylvie Parent	Colette Éthier (X)	1,073	43.13
Longueuil citoyen - Équipe Josée Latendresse	Stéphanie Beaudry-Zanotty	918	36.90
Option Longueuil - Équipe Sadia Groguhé	Lucie Gélinas	431	17.32
Independent	Sébastien Guyon	66	2.65
Greenfield Park District (10)
Party	Council candidate	Vote	%
Option Longueuil - Équipe Sadia Groguhé	Robert Myles (X)	2,216	45.77
Longueuil citoyen - Équipe Josée Latendresse	Sylvain Joly	1,192	24.62
Independent	Mick O'Grady	744	15.37
Action Longueuil - Équipe Sylvie Parent	Stoycho Chopov	690	14.25
Laflèche District (11)
Party	Council candidate	Vote	%
Longueuil citoyen - Équipe Josée Latendresse	Jacques Lemire (X)	2,783	69.84
Action Longueuil - Équipe Sylvie Parent	Joanne Costco	677	16.99
Option Longueuil - Équipe Sadia Groguhé	Jérémy Dufour-Dinelle	525	13.17
Vieux-Saint-Hubert-de la Savane District (12)
Party	Council candidate	Vote	%
Longueuil citoyen - Équipe Josée Latendresse	Nathalie Boisclair (X)	2,160	51.10
Action Longueuil - Équipe Sylvie Parent	Martin Fontaine	1,472	34.82
Option Longueuil - Équipe Sadia Groguhé	Michel Coursol	391	9.25
Independent	Alpha Keita	204	4.83
Parc-de-la-Cité District (13)
Party	Council candidate	Vote	%
Longueuil citoyen - Équipe Josée Latendresse	Jacques E. Poitras (X)	2,239	51.82
Action Longueuil - Équipe Sylvie Parent	Philippe Beauvais	1,503	34.78
Option Longueuil - Équipe Sadia Groguhé	Patrick Carpentier	579	13.40
Iberville District (14)
Party	Council candidate	Vote	%
Action Longueuil - Équipe Sylvie Parent	Éric Beaulieu (X)	1,971	47.39
Longueuil citoyen - Équipe Josée Latendresse	Alvaro Cueto	1,632	39.24
Option Longueuil - Équipe Sadia Groguhé	Brian Peddar	556	13.37
Maraîchers District (15)
Party	Council candidate	Vote	%
Longueuil citoyen - Équipe Josée Latendresse	Jean-François Boivin (X)	1,903	46.44
Action Longueuil - Équipe Sylvie Parent	Catherine Pagé	1,721	42.00
Option Longueuil - Équipe Sadia Groguhé	Sébastien Vaillancourt	474	11.57

=== Marieville ===
Mayoral candidate	Vote	%
Gilles Delorme	840	28.79
Caroline Gagnon (X)	2,078	71.21

=== McMasterville ===
Mayoral candidate	Vote	%
Martin Dulac	Acclaimed	

=== Mercier ===
Party	Mayoral candidate	Vote	%
Parti Avenir Mercier	Lise Michaud (X)	3,752	74.00
Démocratie Mercier - Équipe Daniel Prince	Daniel Prince	1,318	26.00
Total valid votes		5070	52.6

=== Mont-Saint-Hilaire ===
Party	Mayoral candidate	Vote	%
Avenir hilairemontais - Équipe Yves Corriveau	Yves Corriveau (X)	3,695	55.42
Independent	Denise Loiselle	1,031	15.46
Independent	Jean-Luc Maltais	344	5.16
Vision citoyenne	Luc-André Matte	1,597	23.95
Total valid votes		6,667	46.3

=== Notre-Dame-de-l'Île-Perrot ===
Party	Mayoral candidate	Vote	%
Option citoyens	Danie Deschênes (X)	Acclaimed	

=== Otterburn Park ===
Mayoral candidate	Vote	%
Denis Parent	1,480	64.29
Gérard Schafroth	822	35.71

=== Pincourt ===
Mayoral candidate	Vote	%
Yvan Cardinal (X)	Acclaimed	

=== Richelieu ===
Party	Mayoral candidate	Vote	%
Coalition Richeloise	Jacques Ladouceur (X)	Acclaimed	

=== Rigaud ===
Mayoral candidate	Vote	%
Hans Gruenwald Jr. (X)	1,725	70.67
Jeannine Landry	716	29.33

=== Saint-Amable ===
Party	Mayoral candidate	Vote	%
Essor	François Gamache	1,233	29.75
Vision Equipe Stéphane Williams	Stéphane Williams (X)	2,911	70.25
Total valid votes		4,144	46.2

=== Saint-Basile-le-Grand ===
Party	Mayoral candidate	Vote	%
Independent	Yves Lessard	2,941	53.63
Parti grandbasilois	Maurice Cantin	1,762	32.13
Independent	André Métivier	781	14.24
Total valid votes		5,484	44.6

=== Saint-Bruno-de-Montarville ===
Party	Mayoral candidate	Vote	%
Parti équilibre	André Besner	1,491	13.58
Independent	Michel Deslandes	139	1.27
Independent	Bruno Harvey	1,769	16.11
Alliance municipale de Saint-Bruno-de-Montarville	Thérèse Hudon	2,996	27.29
Parti montarvillois	Martin Murray (X)	4,583	41.75
Total valid votes		10,978	54.7

=== Saint-Césaire ===
Mayoral candidate	Vote	%
Guy Benjamin (X)	Acclaimed	

=== Saint-Constant ===
Party	Mayoral candidate	Vote	%
Parti du vrai changement - Équipe Jean-Claude Boyer	Jean-Claude Boyer (X)	8,369	88.62
Independent	Gilles Pepin	1,075	11.38
Total valid votes		9,444	46.8

=== Sainte-Catherine ===
Party	Mayoral candidate	Vote	%
Parti de l'Équipe Bates	Jocelyne Bates (X)	Acclaimed	

=== Sainte-Julie ===
Party	Mayoral candidate	Vote	%
La voix des citoyens - Équipe Suzanne Roy	Suzanne Roy (X)	Acclaimed	

=== Sainte-Martine ===
Mayoral candidate	Vote	%
Maude Laberge (X)	Acclaimed	

=== Saint-Hyacinthe ===
==== Mayor ====
Mayoral candidate	Vote	%
Claude Corbeil (X)	9,182	59.37
Chantal Goulet	6,284	40.63

==== Saint-Hyacinthe City Council ====
Candidate	Vote	%
Sainte-Rosalie District (1)
Donald Côté (X)	1,003	67.72
André Fournier	478	32.28
Yamaska District (2)
Pierre Thériault	1,033	57.74
Éric Deslauriers	756	42.26
Saint-Joseph District (3)
Stéphanie Messier	690	44.63
Patrick Cordeau	663	42.88
Karine Payant	193	12.48
La Providence District (4)
Bernard Barré (X)	1,213	74.92
Sylvie Norris	406	25.08
Douville District (5)
André Beauregard (X)	1,397	81.32
Simon Drapeau	321	18.68
Saint-Thomas-d'Aquin District (6)
Linda Roy	882	52.59
Jacques Denis (X)	444	26.48
Serge Guertin	351	20.93
Saint-Sacrement District (7)
Annie Pelletier (X)	593	52.43
Donald Poirier	418	36.96
Jessy Létourneau	120	10.61
Bois-Joli District (8)
Claire Gagné	658	48.09
Alain Leclerc (X)	553	40.54
Frédéric Brillon	155	11.36
Sacré-Coeur District (9)
David Bousquet (X)	758	72.54
Danielle Pelland	287	27.46
Cascades District (10)
Jeannot Caron	429	42.10
Sylvie Adam (X)	380	37.29
Angelika Gil	210	20.61
Hertel-Notre-Dame District (11)
Nicole Dion Audette (X)	862	73.17
Julie Raiche	316	26.83

=== Saint-Jean-sur-Richelieu ===
==== Mayor ====
Party	Mayoral candidate	Vote	%
Équipe Alain Laplante	Alain Laplante	11,825	38.84
Équipe Fecteau	Michel Fecteau (X)	10,953	35.98
Avec Bachand	Claude Bachand	6,995	22.98
Independent	Martin Côté	671	2.20
Total valid votes		30,444	41.9

==== Saint-Jean-sur-Richelieu City Council ====
District 1
Party	Council candidate	Vote	%
Independent	Mélanie Dufresne (X)	1,422	79.40
Équipe Alain Laplante	Guy Grenier	369	20.60
District 2
Party	Council candidate	Vote	%
Équipe Alain Laplante	Justin Bessette (X)	1,888	63.83
Équipe Fecteau	Samuel Cousineau Bourgeois	665	22.48
Avec Bachand	Alexandre Fluet	342	11.56
Independent	Elie Pascal Mefire Chotilong	63	2.13
District 3
Party	Council candidate	Vote	%
Équipe Fecteau	Michel Gendron (X)	1,087	39.79
Équipe Alain Laplante	Hugues Larivière	808	29.58
Independent	Louise Lemieux	837	30.64
District 4
Party	Council candidate	Vote	%
Équipe Alain Laplante	Patrick Beausoleil	559	20.71
Équipe Fecteau	Pierre-Paul Gemme	466	17.27
Independent	Fontaine Jean (X)	1,462	54.17
Independent	Guy Langlois	212	7.85
District 5
Party	Council candidate	Vote	%
Équipe Fecteau	François Auger (X)	526	29.01
Équipe Alain Laplante	Mathieu Boulerice	510	28.13
Independent	Richard Daudelin	78	4.30
Independent	James A. Falls	270	14.89
Avec Bachand	Julie Quintin	429	23.66
District 6
Party	Council candidate	Vote	%
Équipe Fecteau	Patricia Poissant (X)	1,533	64.38
Équipe Alain Laplante	Jean-François Pomerleau	848	35.62
District 7
Party	Council candidate	Vote	%
Équipe Fecteau	Christiane Marcoux (X)	1,270	50.64
Équipe Alain Laplante	Julie Messier	1,238	49.36
District 8
Party	Council candidate	Vote	%
Équipe Alain Laplante	François Blais	975	31.68
Équipe Fecteau	Marc-André Paillé	835	27.13
Independent	Marco Savard (X)	1,268	41.20
District 9
Party	Council candidate	Vote	%
Équipe Fecteau	Yvan Berthelot (X)	1,136	51.43
Équipe Alain Laplante	Joan Gosselin	687	31.10
Avec Bachand	Diane Morin	386	17.47
District 10
Party	Council candidate	Vote	%
Avec Bachand	Mylène Gravel	599	21.76
Équipe Fecteau	Pierre Hamelin	795	28.88
Équipe Alain Laplante	Ian Langlois (X)	1,359	49.36
District 11
Party	Council candidate	Vote	%
Équipe Fecteau	Claire Charbonneau (X)	1,051	48.28
Équipe Alain Laplante	Jean Lamoureux	717	32.94
Avec Bachand	Marc-André Ross	409	18.79
District 12
Party	Council candidate	Vote	%
Équipe Alain Laplante	Maryline Charbonneau (X)	1,175	35.06
Équipe Fecteau	Emmanuelle Géhin	790	23.58
Avec Bachand	Jean-Francois Guay	644	19.22
Independent	Jessica Racine-Lehoux	742	22.14

=== Saint-Lambert ===
Mayoral candidate	Vote	%
Pierre Brodeur (X)	3,135	38.67
Marc Edwards	1,664	20.52
Dominique Lebeau	1,521	18.76
Alain Dépatie	822	10.14
Jean-Pierre Roy	735	9.07
Martin Smith	231	2.85

=== Saint-Lazare ===
Mayoral candidate	Vote	%
Robert Grimaudo (X)	2,058	37.82
Lise Jolicoeur	1,855	34.09
Michel Lambert	1538	28.08

=== Saint-Philippe ===
Party	Mayoral candidate	Vote	%
Équipe Johanne Beaulac	Johanne Beaulac	1,106	37.47
Independent	Christian Marin	684	23.17
Independent	Sylvain Trudeau	635	21.51
Équipe Martin	Lise Martin (X)	527	17.85

=== Saint-Pie ===
Mayoral candidate	Vote	%
Mario St-Pierre (X)	Acclaimed	

=== Saint-Rémi ===
Mayoral candidate	Vote	%
Sylvie Gagnon-Breton (X)	2,326	72.96
Louise Trudeau-Lefrançois	862	27.04

=== Saint-Zotique ===
Mayoral candidate	Vote	%
Yvon Chiasson (X)	1,777	52.92
René Saint-Onge	824	24.54
Danny Vernier	757	22.54

=== Salaberry-de-Valleyfield ===
==== Mayor ====
Mayoral candidate	Vote	%
Miguel Lemieux	7,643	52.83
Joanne Brunet	4,939	34.14
Francois Labossière	1,886	13.04

==== Salaberry-de-Valleyfield City Council ====
Candidate	Vote	%
District 1
Lyne Lefebvre	979	46.27
Francois Derome	454	21.46
Monique McSween Gendron	345	16.30
Stéphanie Poirier	205	9.69
Luc Desjean	133	6.29
District 2
Jason Grenier	1,137	76.93
Sylvain Guérin	341	23.07
District 3
Jean-Marc Rochon (X)	892	66.57
Pierre Spénard	268	20.00
Claude St-Denis	180	13.43
District 4
France Chenail	786	41.88
Francois Gingras	421	22.43
Yves Legault	348	18.54
Denis Primeau	276	14.70
André Gendron	46	2.45
District 5
Guillaume Massicotte	1,153	48.77
Sophie Sirois Perras	977	41.33
Dafir Rhammaz	234	9.90
District 6
Jacques Smith (X)	1,039	66.65
Martin Levesque	394	25.27
Bernard St-Jacques	126	8.08
District 7
Patrick Rancourt (X)	1,313	65.62
Sébastien Poiré	688	34.38
District 8
Normand Amesse (X)	1,313	74.56
Normand Bourget	448	25.44

=== Shefford ===
Mayoral candidate	Vote	%
Éric Chagnon	Acclaimed	

=== Sorel-Tracy ===
Mayoral candidate	Vote	%
Serge Péloquin (X)	13,997	85.54
Marcel Robert	1,185	7.24
Vincent Pouliot	641	3.92
Réjean Dauplaise	540	3.30
Total valid votes	16,363	56.9

=== Varennes ===
Party	Mayoral candidate	Vote	%
Parti Durable - Équipe Damphousse	Martin Damphousse (X)	Acclaimed	

=== Vaudreuil-Dorion ===
==== Mayor ====
Party	Mayoral candidate	Vote	%
Parti de l'Action de Vaudreuil-Dorion	Guy Pilon (X)	6,411	63.62
Équipe Nous sommes - Team we are	Pierre Séguin	3,666	36.38
Total valid votes		10,077	37.1

==== Vaudreuil-Dorion City Council ====
Quinchien District (1)
Party	Council candidate	Vote	%
Parti de l'Action de Vaudreuil-Dorion	Josée Clément	725	56.51
Équipe Nous sommes - Team we are	Chantal Brunet	558	43.49
Valois District (2)
Party	Council candidate	Vote	%
Parti de l'Action de Vaudreuil-Dorion	François Séguin (X)	769	59.75
Équipe Nous sommes - Team we are	Sylvie Gordian	518	40.25
Des Bâtisseurs District (3)
Party	Council candidate	Vote	%
Parti de l'Action de Vaudreuil-Dorion	Jasmine Sharma	754	61.05
Équipe Nous sommes - Team we are	Anita Ali	481	38.95
De la Seigneurie District (4)
Party	Council candidate	Vote	%
Parti de l'Action de Vaudreuil-Dorion	Céline Chartier (X)	859	60.79
Équipe Nous sommes - Team we are	Karine Roy	554	39.21
Des Chenaux District (5)
Party	Council candidate	Vote	%
Parti de l'Action de Vaudreuil-Dorion	Diane Morin	763	56.98
Équipe Nous sommes - Team we are	Delphine Camet	576	43.02
Saint-Michel District (6)
Party	Council candidate	Vote	%
Parti de l'Action de Vaudreuil-Dorion	Gabriel Parent (X)	742	61.07
Équipe Nous sommes - Team we are	Marc Langlois	473	38.93
Desrochers District (7)
Party	Council candidate	Vote	%
Parti de l'Action de Vaudreuil-Dorion	Paul M. Normand (X)	720	62.88
Équipe Nous sommes - Team we are	Julien Bédard	425	37.12
De la Baie District (8)
Party	Council candidate	Vote	%
Parti de l'Action de Vaudreuil-Dorion	Paul Dumoulin (X)	759	64.71
Équipe Nous sommes - Team we are	Daniel Landry	414	35.29

=== Verchères ===
Mayoral candidate	Vote	%
Alexandre Bélisle (X)	Acclaimed	

== Centre-du-Québec ==
=== Bécancour ===
Mayoral candidate	Vote	%
Jean-Guy Dubois (X)	4,053	75.57
Martine Pepin	1,310	24.43

=== Drummondville ===
==== Mayor ====
Mayoral candidate	Vote	%
Alexandre Cusson (X)	Acclaimed	

===== By-election =====
A mayoral by-election was intended to be held October 4, 2020 to replace Cusson. However, only one candidate, Alain Carrier entered the race, and was therefore acclaimed.

Mayoral candidate	Vote	%
Alain Carrier	Acclaimed	

==== Drummondville City Council ====
Candidate	Vote	%
District 1
Dominic Martin (X)	Acclaimed	
District 2
Jean Charest (X)	Acclaimed	
District 3
Catherine Lassonde (X)	804	59.47
Marie-Josée Lemaire	548	40.53
District 4
Isabelle Marquis (X)	551	60.02
Alain D'Auteuil	367	39.98
District 5
John Husk (X)	Acclaimed	
District 6
William Morales (X)	1,002	57.09
Israël Poulin	753	42.91
District 7
Alain Martel (X)	906	86.45
Yves Gauthier	142	13.55
District 8
Yves Grondin (X)	Acclaimed	
District 9
Annick Bellavance (X)	Acclaimed	
District 10
Stéphanie Lacoste (X)	525	70.28
Julian Morato	222	29.72
District 11
Daniel Pelletier (X)	Acclaimed	
District 12
Cathy Bernier (X)	Acclaimed	

===== By-election =====
A by-election was held on June 16, 2019 in District 4:

Candidate	Vote	%
Alain D'Auteuil	250	44.09
Sarah Saint-Cyr Lanoie	229	40.39
Sébastien Lepage	88	15.47

=== Nicolet ===
Mayoral candidate	Vote	%
Geneviève Dubois (X)	Acclaimed	

=== Plessisville ===
Mayoral candidate	Vote	%
Mario Fortin (X)	Acclaimed	

=== Princeville ===
Mayoral candidate	Vote	%
Gilles Fortier (X)	Acclaimed	

=== Victoriaville ===
==== Mayor ====
Mayoral candidate	Vote	%
André Bellavance (X)	13,936	96.93
Jean Roy	441	3.07

==== Victoriaville City Council ====
Candidate	Vote	%
du Parc-de-L'Amitié District (1)
Caroline Pilon (X)	Acclaimed	
du Parc-de-L'Île District (2)
Benoit Gauthier (X)	1,279	81.99
Simon Roux	281	18.01
Charles-Édouard-Mailhot District (3)
Patrick Paulin	1,100	78.35
Luc Richard	304	21.65
Sainte-Famille District (4)
Alexandre Côté (X)	Acclaimed	
du Parc-Terre-des-Jeunes District (5)
Yanick Poisson	626	40.99
Robert Justras	402	26.54
Caroline Moreau	396	25.85
Marilyn Bergeron	106	6.92
du Parc-Victoria District (6)
Marc Morin (X)	720	52.67
Michel Patry	331	24.21
Henri Dusseault	316	23.12
Sainte-Victoire District (7)
Yannick Fréchette	793	53.04
Yves Bernier	641	42.88
François Hébert	61	4.08
Arthabaska-Nord District (8)
Chantal Moreau	1,010	68.99
Sophie Harvey	454	31.01
Arthabaska-Ouest District (9)
Michael Provencher (X)	Acclaimed	
Arthabaska-Est District (10)
Sophie Lambert	718	45.70
Guy Houle	714	45.45
Roch Simard	139	8.85

== Prefectural elections ==
=== Kamouraska ===
Prefectural candidate	Vote	%
Yvon Soucy (X)	Acclaimed	

=== La Haute-Gaspésie ===
Prefectural candidate	Vote	%
Allen Cormier (X)	3,250	59.70
Frederick DeRoy	1,743	32.02
Maxime Esther Bouchard	451	8.28

=== La Matapédia ===
Prefectural candidate	Vote	%
Chantale Lavoie (X)	4,578	66.79
Gaëtan Ruest	2,276	33.21

=== La Vallée-de-la-Gatineau ===
Prefectural candidate	Vote	%
Chantal Lamarche	3,714	38.80
Georges Lafontaine	3,442	35.96
Simon Godin	1,425	14.89
Claude Beaudoin	992	10.36

=== Le Granit ===
Prefectural candidate	Vote	%
Marielle Fecteau (X)	4,091	47.82
Yves D'Anjou	1,967	22.99
Sylvain Gilbert	1,257	14.69
Marc L'Ecuyer	1,240	14.49

=== Le Haut-Saint-François ===
Prefectural candidate	Vote	%
Robert G. Roy (X)	Acclaimed	

=== Le Rocher-Percé ===
Prefectural candidate	Vote	%
Nadia Minassian (X)	Acclaimed	

=== Les Basques ===
Prefectural candidate	Vote	%
Bertin Denis (X)	Acclaimed	

=== Les Pays-d'en-Haut ===
Prefectural candidate	Vote	%
André Genest	6,015	39.24
Guy Vandenhove	4,201	27.40
Marie-Claire Vachon	3,114	20.31
Martin Nadon	2,000	13.05

=== Manicouagan ===
Prefectural candidate	Vote	%
Marcel Furlong	4,341	43.93
Ginette Côté	3,679	37.23
Paul Brisson	1,862	18.84

=== Maria-Chapdelaine ===
Prefectural candidate	Vote	%
Luc Simard	4,582	50.96
Jean-Pierre Boivin (X)	2,503	27.84
Marcel Gauthier	1,273	14.16
Pieter Wentholt	634	7.05

=== Minganie ===
Prefectural candidate	Vote	%
Luc Noël (X)	Acclaimed	

=== Montcalm ===
Prefectural candidate	Vote	%
Louis-Charles Thouin	Acclaimed	

=== Pontiac ===
Prefectural candidate	Vote	%
Jane Toller	3,597	47.00
Raymond Durocher	1,366	17.85
Linda Davis	1,045	13.65
Charlotte L'Écuyer	828	10.82
Pierre Fréchette	817	10.68

=== Témiscamingue ===
Prefectural candidate	Vote	%
Claire Bolduc	3,872	66.76
Bernard Flebus	1,270	21.90
Gilles Lepage	514	8.86
Renald Baril	144	2.48

=== Témiscouata ===
Prefectural candidate	Vote	%
Guylaine Sirois (X)	4,796	53.53
Gaétan Ouellet	4,164	46.47

== See also ==
- Municipal elections in Canada
- Electronic voting in Canada
- 2005 Quebec municipal elections
- 2006 Quebec municipal elections
- 2009 Quebec municipal elections
- 2013 Quebec municipal elections
