= 2017 Boucherville municipal election =

Boucherville Municipal Election in 2017

← 2013	5 November 2017	2021 →
	Majority party	Minority party	Third party
Leader	Jean Martel	Monique Reeves	Independent
Party	Équipe Jean Martel Option Citoyens Citoyennes	Opposition citoyenne Boucherville - contre l’administration Martel	Independent
Percentage	89.55% (Mayoral) 77.84% (Councillor)	10.45% (Mayoral) 0.00% (Councillor)	0.00% (Mayoral) 22.16% (Councillor)

The 2017 Boucherville municipal election was an election that was held on the 5th of November 2017 to elect Boucherville's mayor and eight councillors as part of the 2017 Quebec municipal elections.

Jean Martel and his party's eight candidates were elected. The voter turnout was 47.7%.

The election results were made available on the website of Québec's Ministry of Municipal Affairs and Housing.

== Election results ==
=== Mayor ===
Party	Mayoral candidate	Vote
Équipe Jean Martel - Option Citoyens Citoyennes	Jean Martel (Inc.)	13,715
Opposition citoyenne Boucherville - contre l’administration Martel	Monique Reeves	1,601
Total of all valid votes		15,316

=== District 1 (Marie-Victorin) Councillor ===
Party	Mayoral candidate	Vote
Équipe Jean Martel - Option Citoyens Citoyennes	Isabelle Bleau	1,389
Independent	Yan S. Laquerre (Inc.)	979

- Yan S. Laquerre was elected as a candidate for the Équipe Jean Martel - Option Citoyens Citoyennes

=== District 2 (Rivière-aux-Pins) Councillor ===
Party	Mayoral candidate	Vote
Équipe Jean Martel - Option Citoyens Citoyennes	Raouf Absi (Inc.)	1,460
Independent	Olivier Tremblay	556
Independent	Stéphane Laurence	102

=== District 3 (Des Découvreurs) Councillor ===
Party	Mayoral candidate	Vote
Équipe Jean Martel - Option Citoyens Citoyennes	Josée Bissonnette (Inc.)	Acclaimed

=== District 4 (Harmonie) Councillor ===
Party	Mayoral candidate	Vote
Équipe Jean Martel - Option Citoyens Citoyennes	Anne Barabé (Inc.)	1,914
Independent	Frédérick B. Ouellette	293

=== District 5 (La Seigneurie) Councillor ===
Party	Mayoral candidate	Vote
Équipe Jean Martel - Option Citoyens Citoyennes	François Desmarais	1,472
Independent	Michel Sved	260

- The incumbent in District 5 did not run for re-election.

=== District 6 (Saint-Louis) Councillor ===
Party	Mayoral candidate	Vote
Équipe Jean Martel - Option Citoyens Citoyennes	Magalie Queval (Inc.)	Acclaimed

=== District 7 (De Normandie) Councillor ===
Party	Mayoral candidate	Vote
Équipe Jean Martel - Option Citoyens Citoyennes	Jacqueline Boubane (Inc.)	1,637
Independent	Normand Gagnon	180

=== District 8 (Du Boisé) Councillor ===
Party	Mayoral candidate	Vote
Équipe Jean Martel - Option Citoyens Citoyennes	Lise Roy (Inc.)	1,387
Independent	Michel Peccia	273
