= 2009 Boucherville municipal election =

Boucherville Municipal Election in 2017

← 2005	1 November 2009	2013 →
	Majority party	Minority party
Leader	Jean Martel	Reynald Gagné
Party	Équipe Jean Martel Option Citoyens Citoyennes	Renouveau démocratique - Équipe Gagné
Percentage	50.5% (Mayoral) 48.17% (Councillor)	31.8% (Mayoral) 33.72% (Councillor)
	Third party	Fourth party
Leader	Armand Lefebvre	Independent
Party	Action Boucherville	Independent
Percentage	13.1% (Mayoral) 15.1% (Councillor)	4.5% (Mayoral) 3% (Councillor)

The 2009 Boucherville municipal election was an election that was held on the 1st of November 2009 to elect Boucherville's mayor and eight councillors.

Jean Martel and his party's eight candidates were elected. The voter turnout was 49.8%.

The election results were made available on the website of Québec's Ministry of Municipal Affairs and Housing.

== Election Results ==
=== Mayor ===
Party	Mayoral candidate	Vote
Équipe Jean Martel - Option Citoyens Citoyennes	Jean Martel	7,726
Renouveau démocratique - Équipe Gagné	Reynald Gagné	4,868
Action Boucherville	Armand Lefebvre	1,998
Independent	Rémi Bergeron	579
Independent	Réal Belisle	114
Total of all valid votes		15,285

- The incumbent mayor did not run.

=== District 1 (Marie-Victorin) Councillor ===
Party	Mayoral candidate	Vote
Équipe Jean Martel - Option Citoyens Citoyennes	Yan S. Laquerre	946
Renouveau démocratique - Équipe Gagné	Jean-Louis Richer (Inc.)	647
Action Boucherville	François Luc	225
Independent	Marc-André Côté	222

=== District 2 (Rivière-aux-Pins) Councillor ===
Party	Mayoral candidate	Vote
Équipe Jean Martel - Option Citoyens Citoyennes	Francine Crevier	1,152
Renouveau démocratique - Équipe Gagné	Monique Reeves (Inc.)	558
Action Boucherville	Johanne De Villiers	476

=== District 3 (Des Découvreurs) Councillor ===
Party	Mayoral candidate	Vote
Équipe Jean Martel - Option Citoyens Citoyennes	Alexandra Capone	899
Renouveau démocratique - Équipe Gagné	Carl Chevalier (Inc.)	685
Independent	Karyne Brossard	237
Action Boucherville	Joëlle Blanchet	229

=== District 4 (Harmonie) Councillor ===
Party	Mayoral candidate	Vote
Équipe Jean Martel - Option Citoyens Citoyennes	Anne Barabé	902
Renouveau démocratique - Équipe Gagné	Roger Saucier (Inc.)	728
Action Boucherville	Gisèle Thibault	285

=== District 5 (La Seigneurie) Councillor ===
Party	Mayoral candidate	Vote
Équipe Jean Martel - Option Citoyens Citoyennes	Dominic Lévesque	748
Renouveau démocratique - Équipe Gagné	Francine Guidi (Inc.)	515
Action Boucherville	Michaël Léveillée	385

=== District 6 (Saint-Louis) Councillor ===
Party	Mayoral candidate	Vote
Équipe Jean Martel - Option Citoyens Citoyennes	Magalie Queval	1,084
Renouveau démocratique - Équipe Gagné	Alain Langlois	515
Action Boucherville	Lionel Baron	234

- The incumbent did not run.

=== District 7 (De Normandie) Councillor ===
Party	Mayoral candidate	Vote
Équipe Jean Martel - Option Citoyens Citoyennes	Jacqueline Boubane	829
Renouveau démocratique - Équipe Gagné	Marie-Hélène Lecompte	826
Action Boucherville	Jocelyn Lavoie	264

- The incumbent did not run.

=== District 8 (Du Boisé) Councillor ===
Party	Mayoral candidate	Vote
Équipe Jean Martel - Option Citoyens Citoyennes	Lise Roy	800
Renouveau démocratique - Équipe Gagné	Harold Gervais	677
Action Boucherville	Stéphane Paré	210

- The incumbent did not run.
