= Doreen Assaad =

Canadian politician

Her Worship Doreen Assaad
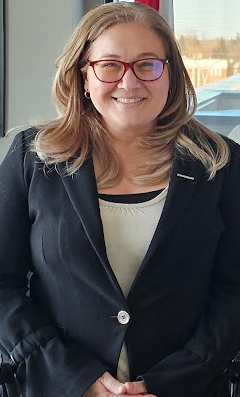

Mayor of Brossard
- Incumbent
- Assumed office November 13, 2017
- Preceded by: Paul Leduc

Leader of Brossard Ensemble
- Incumbent
- Assumed office 2016

Brossard City Councillor
- In office November 3, 2009 – November 4, 2017
- Constituency: District 1 (2009–2013); District 9 (2013–2017)

Personal details
- Party: Brossard Ensemble (since 2016); Priorité Brossard (before 2016)

Doreen Assaad is a Canadian politician. She has been mayor of Brossard, Quebec since 2017, and was re-elected in 2021. Before that, she was a city councillor from 2009 to 2017. She is the second female mayor in the history of the city.

== Early life ==
Assaad was born in Quebec as the daughter of Egyptian immigrants who came to Canada in the 1970s.

Assaad has a degree from the Université de Montréal in applied mathematics and computer science. She has worked for Desjardins Group, the Canadian National Railway and Bombardier Aviation as a business process optimization specialist.

She moved to Brossard in around 2002.

== Political career ==
Assaad was elected to Brossard City Council in the 2009 municipal elections, representing District 1. She was re-elected for a second mandate in the 2013 municipal elections, representing District 9. She was a member of the Priorité Brossard party, led by mayor Paul Leduc. She quit the party in 2016, citing a toxic atmosphere with the mayor. After leaving Leduc's party, she formed her own party called Brossard Ensemble (Brossard Together).

Assaad was elected as mayor of Brossard in the 2017 mayoral election in a four-way race, defeating former New Democratic Party Member of Parliament Hoang Mai, incumbent mayor Paul Leduc and former mayor Jean-Marc Pelletier. She and her party, Brossard Ensemble, won nine of the 10 seats on council. She was re-elected with a large majority in the 2021 mayoral race, with her party winning all but two seats on council.

In 2023, she was elected to the board of directors of the Union des Municipalités du Québec, for a two-year mandate.

In 2024, Centre Sino-Québec de la Rive-Sud, a Chinese community centre and its director, city councillor Xixi Li, launched a defamation lawsuit against Assaad. Li alleged that Assaad made "false and damaging statements against her" following an RCMP investigation into the community centre which believed the Chinese government was running a police outpost there. In the lawsuit, Li stated that Assaad asked her to step down as councillor and made many statements to journalists and on social media questioning her and her organization's integrity and transparency.

Assaad sits as a member of the Economic Development, Finance and Employment Committee of the Montreal Metropolitan Community, and she is a member of the Plan métropolitain d’aménagement et de développement (PMAD) special commission. She is also the vice president of the Réseau de transport de Longueuil, and sits on the board of directors of Tourisme Montérégie.

As mayor of Brossard, Assaad also sits on the council of the Urban agglomeration of Longueuil.

== Personal life ==
Assaad is married and has three children.
