= Brossard City Council =

Local government in Quebec

Brossard City Council (in French: Le conseil municipal de Brossard) is the governing body for the mayor–council government in the city of Brossard, Quebec in the Montérégie region. The council consists of the mayor and ten councillors.

== Current Brossard City Council ==
The Mayor and Councillors listed below were elected in the 2021 municipal election to serve a term of four years. The next election is scheduled to take place in 2025.

Source: Brossard Elected Officials

Name	Party	District
Doreen Assaad	Brossard Ensemble	Mayor
Christian Gaudette	Brossard Ensemble	1 (Sectors C-E-B)
Tina Del Vecchio	Brossard Ensemble	2 (Sector B)
Stéphanie Quintal	Brossard Ensemble	3 (Sector A)
Patrick Langlois	Brossard Ensemble	4 (Sectors P-V)
Claudio Benedetti	Independent	5 (Sector T-S-P)
Sophie Allard	Brossard Ensemble	6 (Sector S)
Antoine Assaf	Brossard Ensemble	7 (Sector R)
Xixi Li	Coalition Brossard	8 (Sectors O-N-I)
Michelle J. Hui	Brossard Ensemble	9 (Sectors L-N-J-X-Y)
Daniel Lucier	Brossard Ensemble	10 (Sectors L-M-N)
