= Boucherville City Council =

Boucherville Municipal Council _{Conseil Municipal de Boucherville (French)}

Type
- Type: Unicameral

Leadership
- Mayor: Jean Martel

Structure
- Seats: 8 plus mayor
- Political groups: Équipe Jean Martel Option Citoyens Citoyennes: 9 seats

Elections
- Last election: 5 November 2017

Website
- boucherville.ca

Boucherville City Council (French: Conseil municipal de Boucherville) is the governing body of Boucherville, a city located in the region of Montérégie in Quebec, Canada.

== List of councillors (2017-present) ==
Name	District	Party
Isabelle Bleau	Marie-Victorin - 1	Équipe Jean Martel Option Citoyens Citoyennes
Raouf Absi	Rivière-aux-Pins - 2	Équipe Jean Martel Option Citoyens Citoyennes
Josée Bissonnette	Des Découvreurs - 3	Équipe Jean Martel Option Citoyens Citoyennes
Anne Barabé	Harmonie - 4	Équipe Jean Martel Option Citoyens Citoyennes
François Desmarais	La Seigneurie - 5	Équipe Jean Martel Option Citoyens Citoyennes
Magalie Queval	Saint-Louis - 6	Équipe Jean Martel Option Citoyens Citoyennes
Jacqueline Boubane	De Normandie - 7	Équipe Jean Martel Option Citoyens Citoyennes
Lise Roy	Du Boisé - 8	Équipe Jean Martel Option Citoyens Citoyennes

== List of councillors (2015-2017) ==
Name	District	Party
Yan Savaria-Laquerre	Marie-Victorin - 1	Independent
Raouf Absi	Rivière-aux-Pins - 2	Équipe Jean Martel Option Citoyens Citoyennes
Josée Bissonnette	Des Découvreurs - 3	Équipe Jean Martel Option Citoyens Citoyennes
Anne Barabé	Harmonie - 4	Équipe Jean Martel Option Citoyens Citoyennes
François Desmarais	La Seigneurie - 5	Équipe Jean Martel Option Citoyens Citoyennes
Magalie Queval	Saint-Louis - 6	Équipe Jean Martel Option Citoyens Citoyennes
Jacqueline Boubane	De Normandie - 7	Équipe Jean Martel Option Citoyens Citoyennes
Lise Roy	Du Boisé - 8	Équipe Jean Martel Option Citoyens Citoyennes

== List of councillors (2013-2015) ==
Name	District
Yan Savaria-Laquerre	Marie-Victorin - 1
Francine Crevier Bélair	Rivière-aux-Pins - 2
Alexandra Capone	Des Découvreurs - 3
Anne Barabé	Harmonie - 4
Dominique Levésque	La Seigneurie - 5
Magalie Queval	Saint-Louis - 6
Jacqueline Boubane	De Normandie - 7
Lise Roy	Du Boisé - 8

== List of mayors (1954-present) ==
Name	Term start	Term end
Clovis Langlois	1954	1973
Yvon Julien	1973	1978
Jean-Guy Parent	1978	1985
Hugues Aubertin	1985	2009
Francine Gadbois	1994	2009
Jean Martel	2009	present
