= Bibliothèque de Laval =

Coordinates: 45°33′2″N 73°44′36″W

Bibliothèques de Laval
- Type: Public Library System of Laval,
- Established: 1959
- Branches: 9

Collection
- Items collected: books, e-books, music, cds, periodicals, maps, genealogical archives, business directories, local history,
- Size: 2 million items

Other information
- Website: Bibliothèque de Laval

The Bibliothèques de Laval (French pronunciation: [biblijɔtɛk də laval]), is the public library system of Laval, Quebec, Canada. It is one of the largest French language public library systems in the province and in North America. There are nine different branches listed below.

The bibliothèque Multiculturelle is the only one that has English and foreign language books; the other 9 are mostly French (with the exception of magazines, CDs, DVDs and videos). In 1995, Laval public library lent more than 2 million documents, to almost 92,000 readers in 25,731 opened hours.

== Services ==
- Information and reference services
- Access to full text databases
- Community information
- Internet access
- Reader's advisory services
- Programs for children, youth and adults
- Delivery to homebound individuals
- Interlibrary loan
- Free downloadable ebooks

== Branches ==
- Émile-Nelligan Laval-des-Rapides
- Gabrielle-Roy Fabreville
- Germaine-Guèvremont Duvernay
- Laure-Conan Vimont
- Marius-Barbeau Saint Francois
- Multiculturelle Chomedey
- Philippe-Panneton Laval Ouest
- Sylvain-Garneau Sainte Rose
- Yves-Thériault Ste Dorothee
