= List of crossings of the Rivière des Mille Îles =

Crossings of river channel in Quebec, Canada

This is a list of bridges and other crossings from Laval, Quebec to the north shore of the Rivière des Mille Îles from where it joins the Rivière des Prairies upstream to the Ottawa River (Lac des Deux Montagnes).

Crossing	Year	Carries	Location	Coordinates and comments
Railway Bridge, R des M-Î/QGR1		Quebec Gatineau Railway	Laval (Saint-François) - Terrebonne	
Pont Sophie-Masson	2006/ 2008	Route 125	Laval (Saint-François) - Terrebonne	* Replaces Vieux Pont de Terrebonne which has been sold as scrap.
Pont Préfontaine-Prévost, a.k.a. Vieux Pont de Terrebonne		Abandoned	Laval (Saint-François) - Terrebonne	* Replaced by Pont Sophie-Masson and sold as scrap.
Île des Moulins dam		Île des Moulins dam	Within Terrebonne, from Île Saint-Jean to Île des Moulins, and from Île des Moulins to the mainland.	Pedestrians and bicycles only. Partial crossing
Pont Matthieu		Autoroute 25	Laval (Saint-François) - Terrebonne (Île Sain-Jean)	
Pont Lepage		Autoroute 25	Terrebonne (Île Sain-Jean) - Terrebonne (Rive Nord)	
Plage des Îles		Plage des Îles	Within Laval, connects Laval (Saint-François) with Île Saint-Joseph (Saint-François) only	Partial crossing
Pont Athanase-David		Route 335	Laval (Auteuil) - Bois-des-Filion	
Railway Bridge, R des M-Î/QGR2		Quebec Gatineau Railway; RTM Saint-Jerome	Laval (Sainte-Rose) - Rosemère	
Pont Marius-Dufresne		Route 117	Laval (Sainte-Rose) - Rosemère via Île Bélair	
Île Ducharme		Chemin de l'Île-Ducharme	Within Boisbriand, connects Île Ducharme to the mainland	Partial crossing
Île Gagnon		Rue Île-Gagnon	Within Laval, connects Île Gagnon to Laval (Sainte-Rose)	Partial crossing, private
Pont Gédéon-Ouimet		Autoroute 15/Trans-Canada Highway	Laval (Fabreville/Sainte-Rose) - Boisbriand via Île Locas (no exit)	
Île Locas		Bd de Lisbonne	Within Laval, connects Île Locas to Laval (Fabreville)	Partial crossing
Île Morris		Chemin de l'Île Morris	Within Boisbriand, connects Île Morris to the mainland.	Partial crossing
Île de Mai		Chemin de l'Île de Mai	Within Boisbriand, connects Île de Mai to the mainland.	Partial crossing
Pont Vachon		Autoroute 13	Laval (Fabreville) - Boisbriand/Saint-Eustache	
Îles Corbeil		Chemin des Îles Corbeil	Within Saint-Eustache, connects Îles Corbeil to the mainland.	Partial crossing
Private bridge		Chemin des Îles Yale	Within Saint-Eustache, connects Îles Yale to the mainland.	Partial crossing, private
Pont Arthur-Sauvé		Route 148	Laval (Laval-Ouest) - Saint-Eustache	
Barrage du Grand-Moulin (aka Le Barrage des Grands Moulins or Barrage Grand-Moulin), Flood control gate		Top deck carries pedestrians and bicycles	Laval (Laval-sur-le-Lac) - Deux-Montagnes, via Île Boisée which is in Laval-Ouest	
Railway Bridge, R des M-Î/RTM		Canadian National Railway owned by RTM Deux-Montagnes	Laval (Laval-sur-le-Lac) - Deux-Montagnes, via Île Boisée which is in Laval-Ouest	Immediately upstream from the barrage

== See also ==
- List of crossings of the Rivière des Prairies
- List of crossings of the Saint Lawrence River
- List of bridges in Montreal
- List of bridges in Quebec
- List of crossings of the Ottawa River
