= Saint-Vincent-de-Paul, Quebec =

District of Laval, Quebec, Canada

Coordinates: 45°37′N 73°39′W

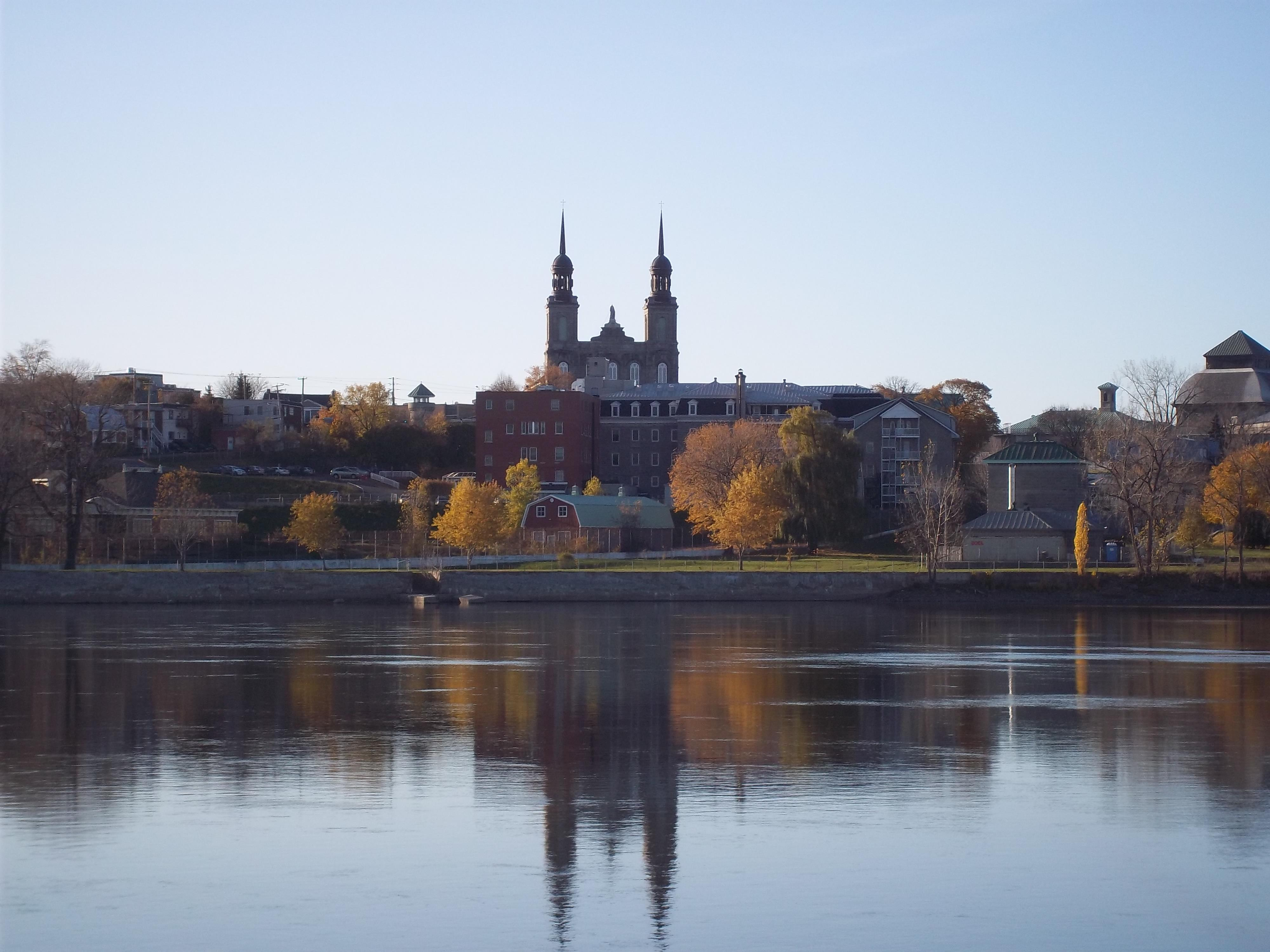
Saint-Vincent-de-Paul

Saint-Vincent-de-Paul (French pronunciation: [sɛ̃ vɛ̃sɑ̃ də pɔl]) is a district in the eastern part of Laval, Quebec, Canada. Saint-Vincent-de-Paul was a town before August 6, 1965. Saint-Vincent-de-Paul is named after Vincent de Paul.

== Geography ==
It is surrounded by Duvernay at the west and by Saint-François at the north and east.

== Roads and bridges ==
The Pie IX Bridge connects St-Vincent-de-Paul and the Montreal borough of Montreal North across the Rivière des Prairies.

== Education ==
Commission scolaire de Laval operates Francophone public schools.

- Saint-Vincent-de-Paul has one public high school, École secondaire Georges-Vanier.
- École primaire Du Bois-Joli
- École primaire Jean XXIII
- École primaire L’Envol (alternative school)

It has one Francophone private school: Collège Laval

Sir Wilfrid Laurier School Board operates Anglophone public schools. Elementary schools serving Saint-Vincent-de-Paul include:

- Saint Vincent Elementary School

All portions of Laval are zoned to Laval Junior Academy and Laval Senior Academy.
