= Auteuil, Quebec =

Auteuil
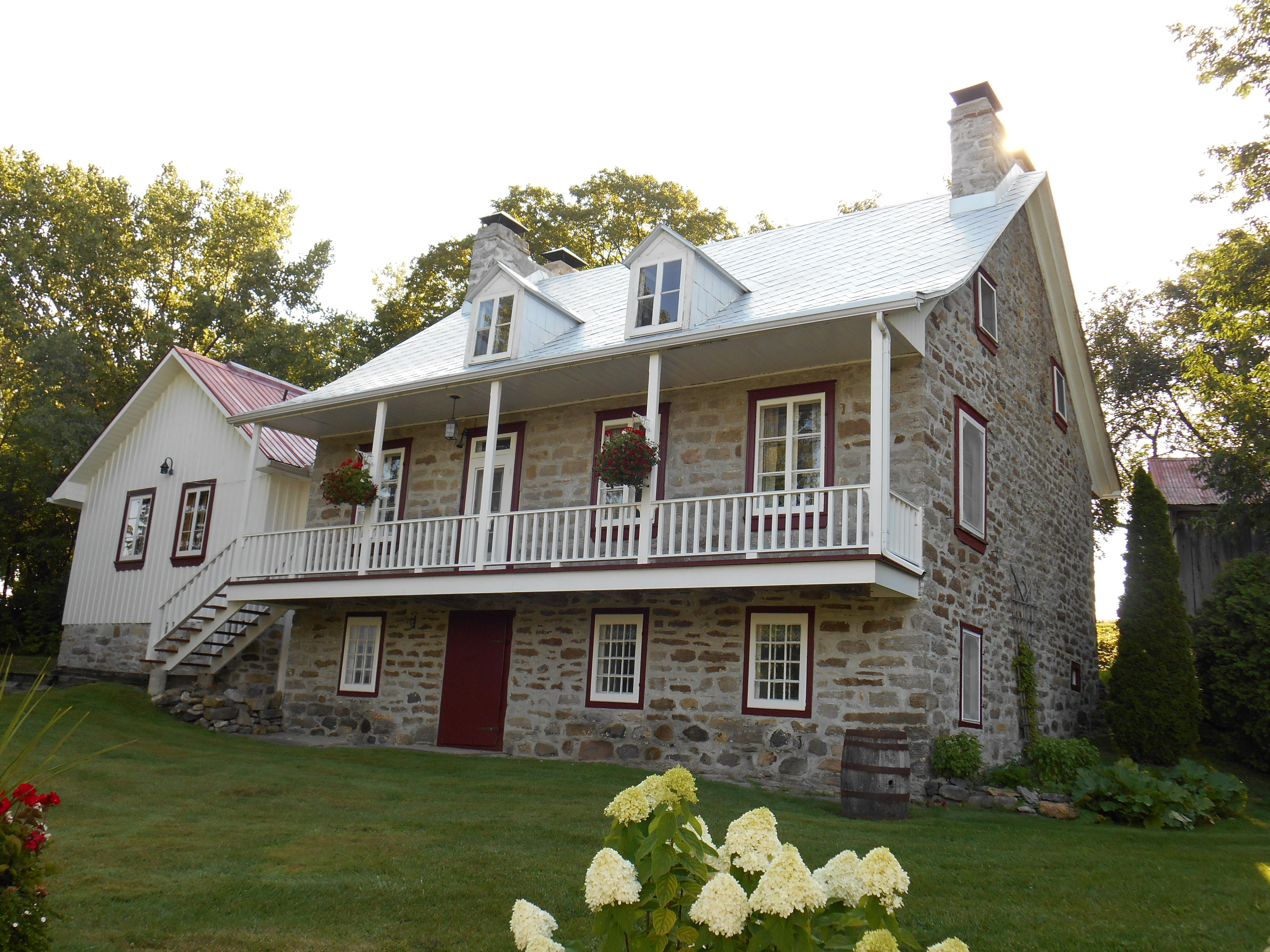
- Joseph-Labelle House

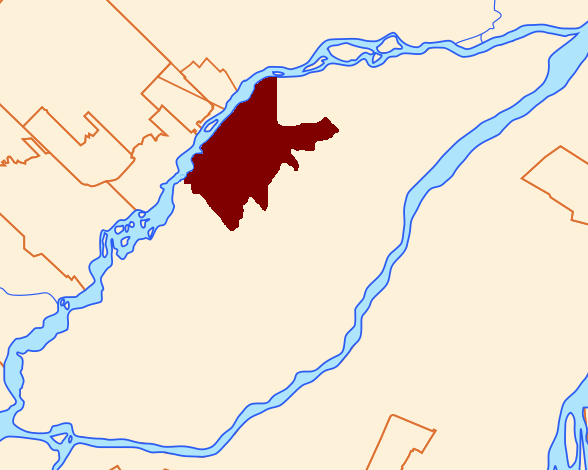
- Coordinates: 45.37°N 73.45°W
- Country: Canada
- Province: Quebec
- City: Laval
- Postal Code: H7H, H7J, H7K
- Area codes: 450, 579

Auteuil (French pronunciation: [otœj]) is a district of Laval in Quebec, Canada. It is delimited in the north-west by the Rivière des Mille-Îles, north-east by Saint-François, south-east by Duvernay, south by Vimont and south-west by Sainte-Rose.

== History ==
Auteuil corresponds roughly to the former territory of Sainte-Rose-Est Parish. At its creation in 1740 the parish of Sainte-Rose-de-Lima covered almost the entire north-west of the Île Jésus. Its first church was located on the eastern boundary of the old city of Auteuil, on the banks of the Mille Îles River near Rue Descartes and Rue Debien.

The church was destroyed by fire and, because of a controversy over its location between Monseigneur Briand and the parishioners worship was interrupted. Rebuilt in 1788, it was relocated 6.7 km south-west of the old site.

On 1 January 1858, the village of Sainte-Rose corporation detached itself and formed a separate municipality (see Sainte-Rose). In 1914 there was a second separation: the eastern and western parts of Sainte-Rose, which led to the creation of the Municipality of Sainte-Rose-de-Lima for the eastern part which was known as Saint-Rose-Est and Bas Sainte-Rose.

As a rural municipality, Sainte-Rose-Est experienced significant population growth until 1953. At that time the beaches on the Mille Îles River located in Sainte-Rose-Est attracted visitors from Île Jésus and Montreal. The Provincial Transport bus company organized tours bringing tourists to the Jean-Talon Terminus near the market of the same name at the Idéale Beach which was by far the most popular. There were however two other beaches near it: Mont-Royal and Jacques-Cartier beaches.

The population in 1953 was less than 1,000 who lived along the Mille Îles River. Growth in population of Sainte-Rose-Est occurred between 1953 and 1960 when it had 4,000 families during the summer season when the normal population was only 2,000 families.

In 1961 Sainte-Rose-Est was officially renamed Auteuil and, in the same year, the parish of Sainte-Béatrice was founded. It was a separate city until the municipal mergers on 6 August 1965.

This district is the eastern extension of the residential centres west of Sainte-Rose, east of Saint-François, east of Duvernay, and south of Vimont. Most of the land is agricultural.

== Education ==
Commission scolaire de Laval operates French-language public schools. The Auteuil Francophone primary schools are:

- Alfred-Pellan
- Sainte-Béatrice
- Charles-Bruneau

Francophone secondary schools in the area are:

- Odyssée des Jeunes for 1st and 2nd Secondary
- École secondaire Horizon Jeunesse ("Horizon Youth") for Secondary 3-5

The old Ulric-Debien school was located on the Place Jean-Coutu in the northern part of Auteuil.

Sir Wilfrid Laurier School Board operates English-language public schools. Elementary schools serving sections of Auteuil:

- Terry Fox Elementary School
  - The school's previous campus was in Vimont. On September 20, 1993 the current campus in Auteuil opened. By 2013 the campus was at 113% capacity.

All sections of Laval are zoned to Laval Junior Academy and Laval Senior Academy

== Transport ==
Auteuil is served by the Société de transport de Laval and several routes have their terminus at Auteuil such as routes 17, 31, 39, 41, and 43. Other routes cross the district to get to other parts of Laval such as route 27 which goes to Vimont, route 73 which goes to Chomedey, and route 74 which goes to St. François. A rank for shared taxis with a capacity for 10 vehicles is on Boulevard des Laurentides to serve the agricultural areas of Auteuil along the Avenue des Perron. The Sainte-Rose (AMT) railway station is also located on the edge of the Sainte-Rose district at the top of Boulevard Sainte-Rose-Est.

=== Main roads ===
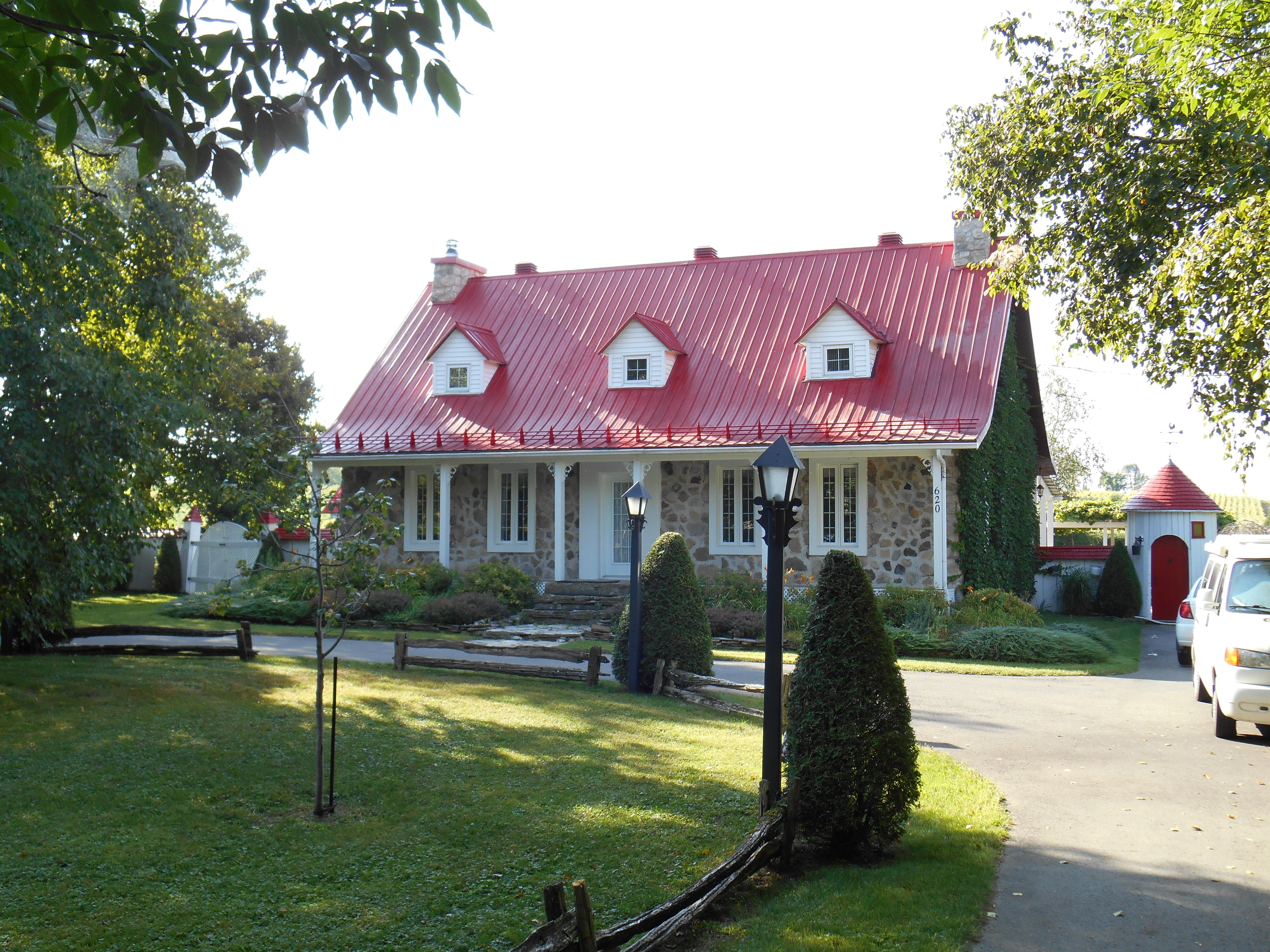
A house on Boulevard des Mille-Îles

The Boulevard des Laurentides is the main road through Auteuil and one of the most important in the municipality. It crosses the area from north to south and is bordered by a variety of shops until the crossroads with Boulevard Sainte-Rose Est where it becomes a mainly residential access road.

The Boulevard Sainte-Rose-Est with Avenue des Perron forms the main east-west axis of the district. It connects the district of Sainte-Rose to the Boulevard des Laurentides at the point where it changes its name. It is surrounded by rather old residential houses to the intersection of Des Laurentides where the Horizon Youth High School and the Mike Bossy arena are.

The Avenue des Perron forms the same axis as the Boulevard Sainte-Rose-Est but to the east of the Boulevard des Laurentides. After going through a residential area the avenue crosses the agricultural area of Auteuil where several local producers are established.

The Boulevard des Mille-Îles is a road that follows the Mille-Îles river where there are several timbered houses blended in with the landscape. In the south it is bordered by the permanent agricultural zone.

The Avenue des Terrasses is a northern route that connects the Sainte-Rose district to the Boulevard des Laurentides. It is bordered by wooded areas and single family homes in different places.

The Avenue de Lacasse connects the Boulevard des Laurentides to the district to the south of Auteuil. Predominantly a residential axis, there is a second isolated part east of Avenue Papineau where some houses have been built in an agricultural zone.

The Avenue Papineau is a newer route, numbered R-335 by the Ministry of Transport of Québec. This avenue is actually a partial extension of Highway 19 which currently ends at Boulevard Dagenais. This road may become Highway 19 until the Athanase-David bridge over the Mille-Îles river if the project materializes.

=== External links ===
- City of Laval, official website
