= Mademoiselle Archambault =

French feminist essayist

Mademoiselle Archambault (French pronunciation: [madmwazɛl aʁʃɑ̃bo]; c. 1724–?) was a French feminist and essayist who argued for the recognition of women's intellectual capabilities. She is remembered for her 1750 work, Dissertation sur la question: lequel de l'homme ou de la femme est plus capable de constance? ('Essay on the Question: Are Men or Women More Loyal?')

== Biography ==
Archambault was born in Laval around 1724 and was the daughter of a tax-collector. Her essay Dissertation sur la question was written in support of 'la cause des dames' (the cause of women). It was published in Paris in 1750, at a time when 17th century rationalism had paved the way for assertions of the separation of mind and body, and a downplaying of the physical differences between men and women. Archambault's essay is written in the form of a debate between Archambault and two anonymous male opponents. The men argue that women do not possess perseverance, courage and self-conquest (or constance in French) required for scholarly endeavour. Archambault asserted that women's fragility only applies to their bodies, just as men's strength only applies to theirs. She wrote that women's superior intellectual qualities were granted by God to compensate for their physical weakness: "[women] have better memories, more receptive, lively and penetrating minds than most men, as even their enemies maintain". Achambault's male opponent concedes that whilst women may be better novelists owing to their delicate style, he asks "[D]o they [novels] suffice to entitle women to call themselves learned?" He states that women do not possess the required characteristics to participate in mathematics, sciences or metaphysical speculation, nor can they develop moral principles. Instead, they should be admired for their ability to partake in children's education and family life.

An unpublished work by Archambault, La femme peut-elle aller de pair avec l'homme tant par la force que par la solidité d'esprit? ('Can Women be as equal to Men in Strength and Intellectual Ability?') can be found in Bibliothèque de Laval in manuscript form.

== External link ==
Dissertation sur la question digitalized on Gallica
