= Protestant School Board of Greater St Martin =

School district in Quebec, Canada

The Protestant School Board of Greater St Martin was a Protestant Christian school district in Quebec, Canada. It operated schools in Chomedey in Greater Montreal. The board was established in 1958.
