= Vimont, Quebec =

Coordinates: 45°35′59.6″N 73°43′30.7″W

Vimont (French pronunciation: [vimɔ̃]) is a district in the centre of Laval, Quebec. It was a separate city until the municipal mergers on August 6, 1965. Until 1960 the name was Saint-Elzéar.

== Geography ==
Vimont is delimited north-west by Sainte-Rose, north-east by Auteuil, east by Duvernay, south-west by Chomedey and south-east by Pont-Viau.

== Features ==
The Cité de la Santé de Laval, Laval's main hospital is located in Vimont, as is the Vimont Commuter Train station. Vimont has one hockey arena in the area, the Lucerne arena. Vimont is part of the Monteuil sports association along with Auteuil.

== Education ==
Commission scolaire de Laval operates Francophone public schools.

- École primaire Les Explorateurs
- École primaire Le Sentier
- École primaire Paul-Comtois
- École primaire Père-Vimont

Sir Wilfrid Laurier School Board operates Anglophone public schools. Elementary schools serving Vimont include:

- St. Paul Elementary School in Duvernay
  - As of 2017 it has about 430 students.
- Terry Fox Elementary School in Auteuil
  - The school's previous campus was in Vimont. On September 20, 1993, the current campus in Auteuil opened. By 2013 the campus was at 113% capacity.

All portions of Laval are zoned to Laval Junior Academy and Laval Senior Academy
