= Chomedey =

Chomedey may refer to

- Chomedey, Quebec, a former city that is now a district of the city of Laval, Quebec
- Paul Chomedey de Maisonneuve, the founder of Ville-Marie (now Montreal, Quebec)
- Chomedey (electoral district), a provincial electoral district in Quebec, Canada
