= Saint-Martin, Laval, Quebec =

Residential sector in Laval in Quebec, Canada, former city

Coordinates: 45°33′08″N 73°45′15″W

Saint-Martin (French pronunciation: [sɛ̃ maʁtɛ̃]) is a former city, now part of the Chomedey neighbourhood of the city of Laval, Quebec, Canada, corresponding roughly to the Roman Catholic parish of Saint-Martin.

The parish church, Église Saint-Martin, is located at 4080, boulevard Saint-Martin. The parish cemetery is located nearby. The city of Laval operates Parc Saint-Martin, a public park at 4025, rue Gaboury.

Saint-Martin, a commuter railway station that no longer exists, was also located here.

== Education ==
- École Saint-Martin is a French-language high school operated by the Centre de services scolaire de Laval, which replaced the Commission scolaire de Laval.
- École d'éducation internationale de Laval (School of international education of Laval) is a French-language high school that uses the IB program.

== Gallery ==
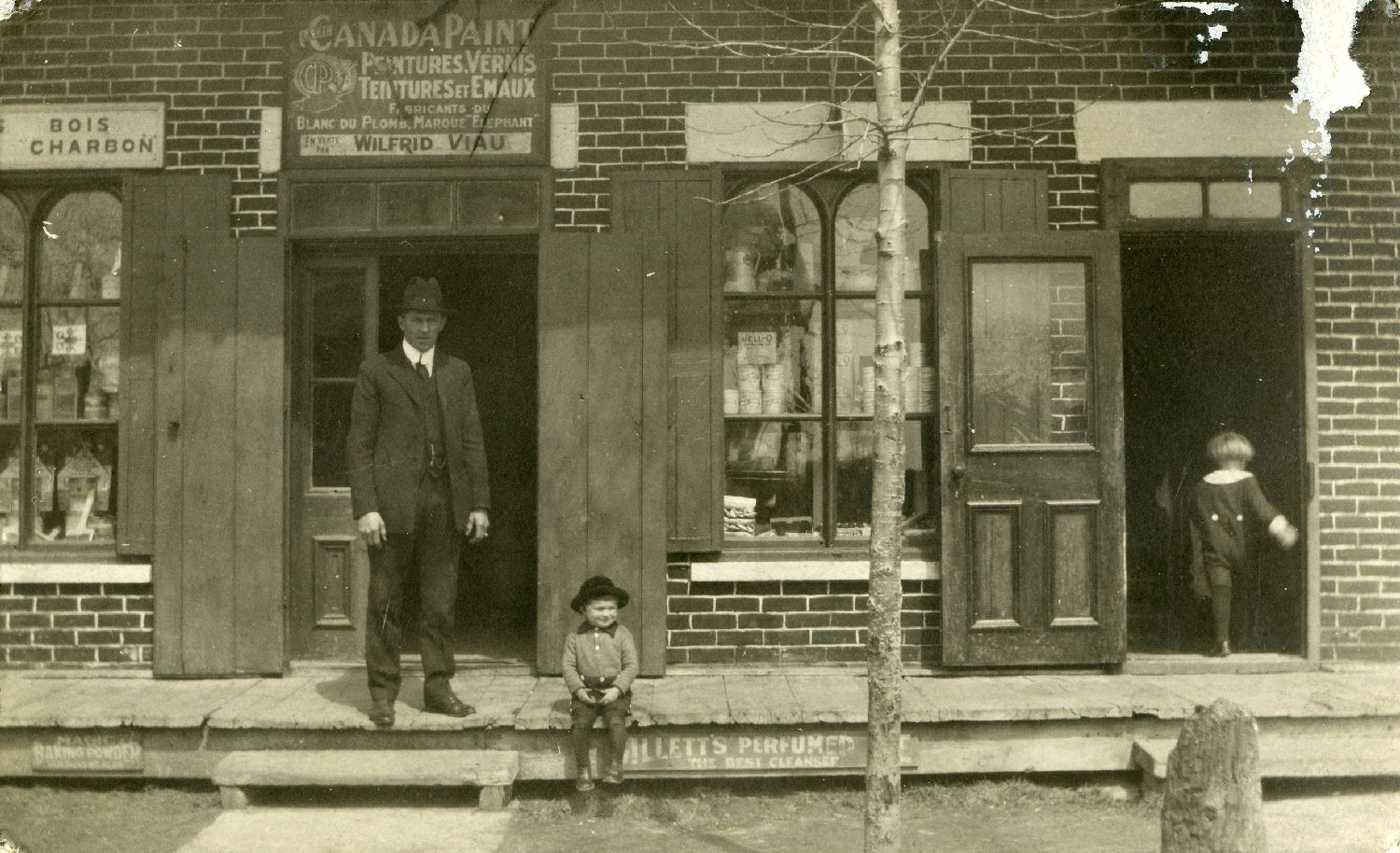
Wilfrid Viau general store in Saint-Martin de Laval, circa 1910

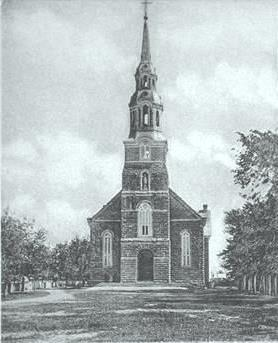
Saint-Martin de Laval parish church prior to the fire in 1942

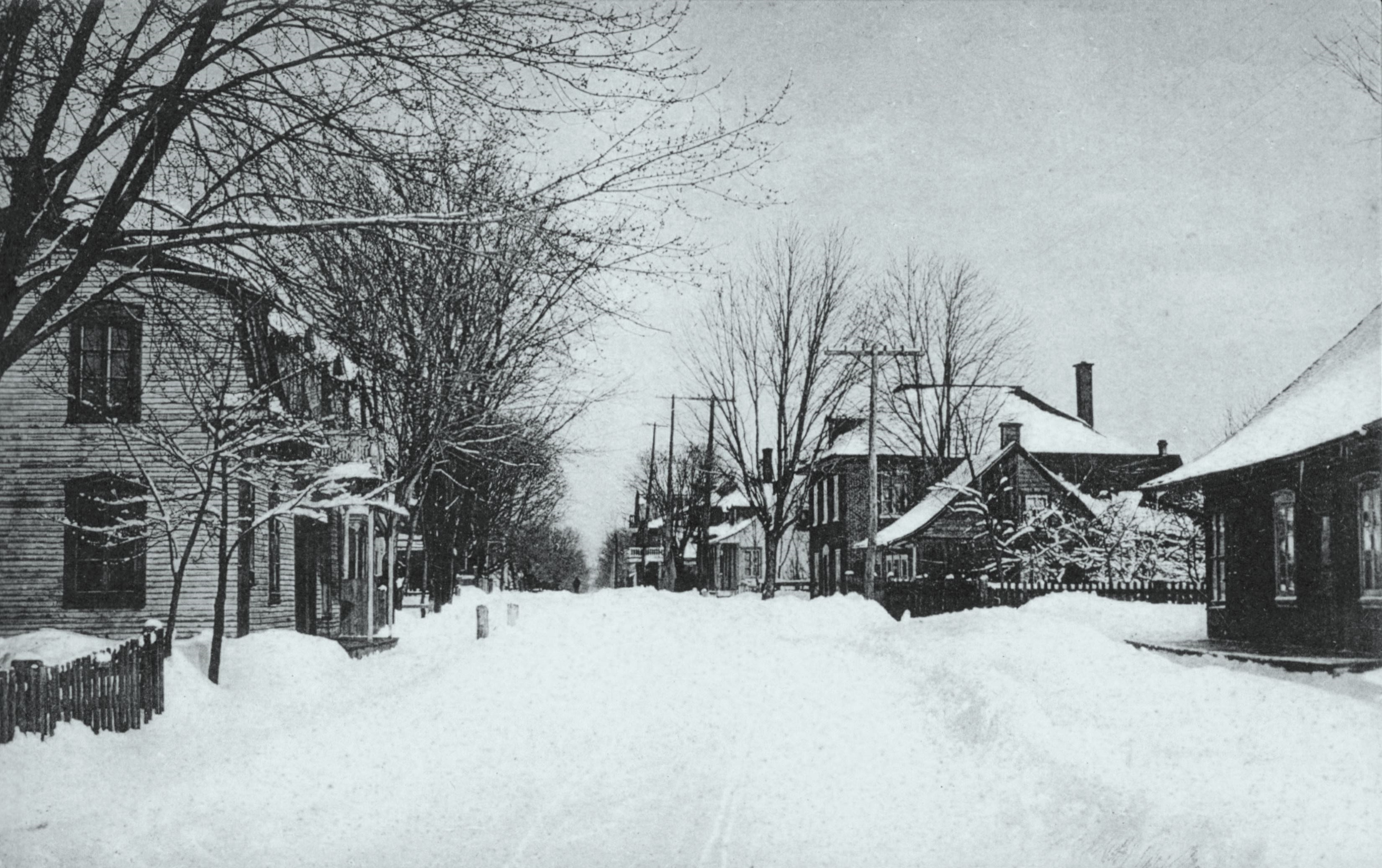
Rue de l'Église in Saint-Martin, circa 1910

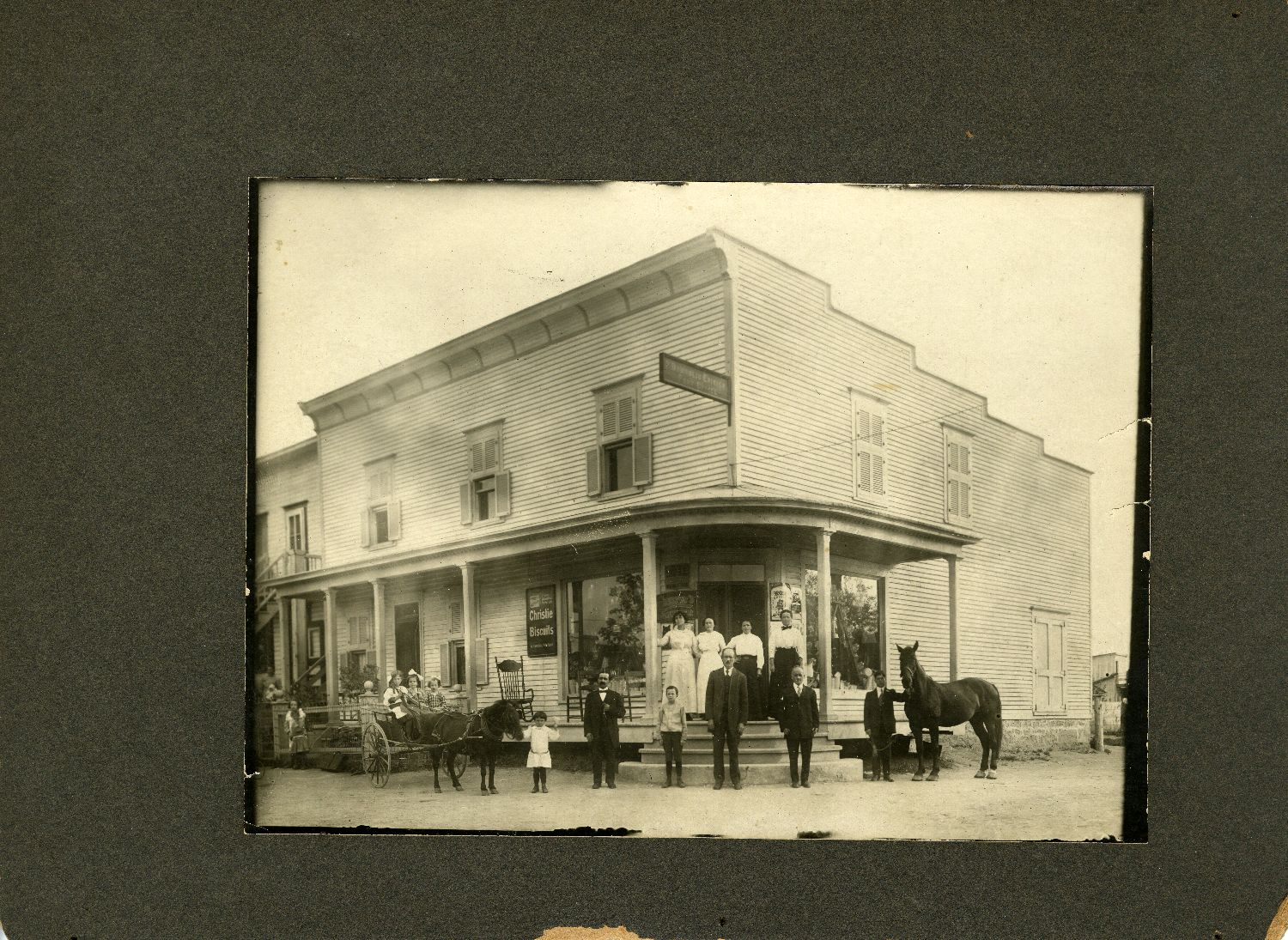
Dumoulin grocery store in Saint-Martin de Laval, circa 1910
