= Saint-François, Laval =

Coordinates: 45°40′13″N 73°34′45″W

Saint-François (formerly Saint-François-de-Sales) is the second largest district of Laval, Quebec, Canada, after Duvernay. It was a separate city until the municipal mergers on August 6, 1965.

Agriculture occupies most of the land area.

== Geography ==
Located at the extreme east of Île Jésus (Laval), it is bounded on the:

- North by the Rivière des Mille Îles;
- South and East by the Rivière des Prairies;
- West by the neighbourhood of Duvernay.

A residential agglomeration formed in the southeast of the neighbourhood. The construction of the A25 Bridge (now the Autoroute 25) that now links with Montreal has been controversial. Ecologists opposed it because the bridge would destroy a wetland where rare species live. All opposition is now moot because the bridge was under construction as of early 2008 and was finished mid-2011.

== Demographics ==
In 2001, the population of St-François is estimated at 16,225, an almost stationary level compared to 1996. The population of St-François remains relatively young; 9.4% are seniors and the average age is 35.9 years old.

St-François is one of the most homogeneous districts on the linguistic level; whereas 88.5% of the population have French as mother tongue and more than 90% of them use that language at home.

90.5% are Catholic Christian. Cultural diversity of the borough appears by a strong presence of visible minorities which 13,0% of the population represent, just a little less than Chomedey.

86.3% of the households are owners (of a bungalow in 92,9% of the cases) and nearly 40% of the houses were built since 1981. The household size is one of the biggest in Laval with an average of three people. However, the number of single-parent families strongly increased since 1996 to reach 15,9% of total families.

St-François is, after Laval-West, the district that are less educated in Laval. Only 12.6% of 20-year-old population and over reached the university and 69.1% have their high school diploma.

The ratio of female population strongly increased by 56.2 to 62.1% in St François and the unemployment rate moved back from 9% to 7%, a level higher than the average.

The working population concentrates especially in services sectors (76.5%) and the most important professional category is retail sales and the services (24.6%). The labour of St-François is among those that count fewer managers (6.8%). It is also noted that only 33.5% of workers are employment on the territory of Laval. The average income of families in St-François is estimated at $59.139/year, approximately $6.000 lower than the municipal average. On the other hand, with 14.1% people living under the low-income threshold, a significant fall compared to 1996, the borough is somewhat under the average.

Source: :PDF document of 2001 census. SERGE BENOIT, DÉMOGRAPHE BUREAU DU BUDGET OCTOBRE 2003. (in French only)

== Politics ==
Saint-Francois is part of the provincial electoral district of Mille-Îles (represented in the Quebec National Assembly) and federal electoral district of Alfred-Pellan (represented in the Canadian House of Commons).

=== Provincial (Quebec National Assembly) ===
- Bernard Lachance, Liberal (1973-1976)
- Guy Joron, Parti Québécois (1976-1981)
- Jean-Paul Champagne, Parti Québécois (1981-1985)
- Jean-Pierre Bélisle, Liberal (1985-1994)
- Lyse Leduc, Parti Québécois (1994-2003)
- Maurice Clermont, Liberal (2003-2008)
- Francine Charbonneau, Liberal (2008–present)

=== Federal (Canadian House of Commons) ===
- Vincent Della Noce, Progressive Conservative (1984-1993) Laval East District
- Maud Debien, Bloc Québécois (1993-2000) Laval East District
- Carole-Marie Allard, Liberal (2000-2004) Laval East District
- Robert Carrier, Bloc Québécois (2004-2011) Alfred-Pellan District
- Rosane Doré Lefebvre New Democratic Party (2011–present)Alfred-Pellan District

== Education ==
Commission scolaire de Laval operates Francophone public schools.

- École primaire Fleur-Soleil
- École primaire Hébert
- École primaire L’Escale

Sir Wilfrid Laurier School Board operates Anglophone public schools. All portions of Laval are zoned to Laval Junior Academy and Laval Senior Academy.

== See also ==
- List of crossings of the Rivière des Prairies
- List of crossings of the Rivière des Mille Îles
- List of former towns in Quebec
