= Sainte-Rose, Quebec =

Coordinates: 45°37′N 73°47′W

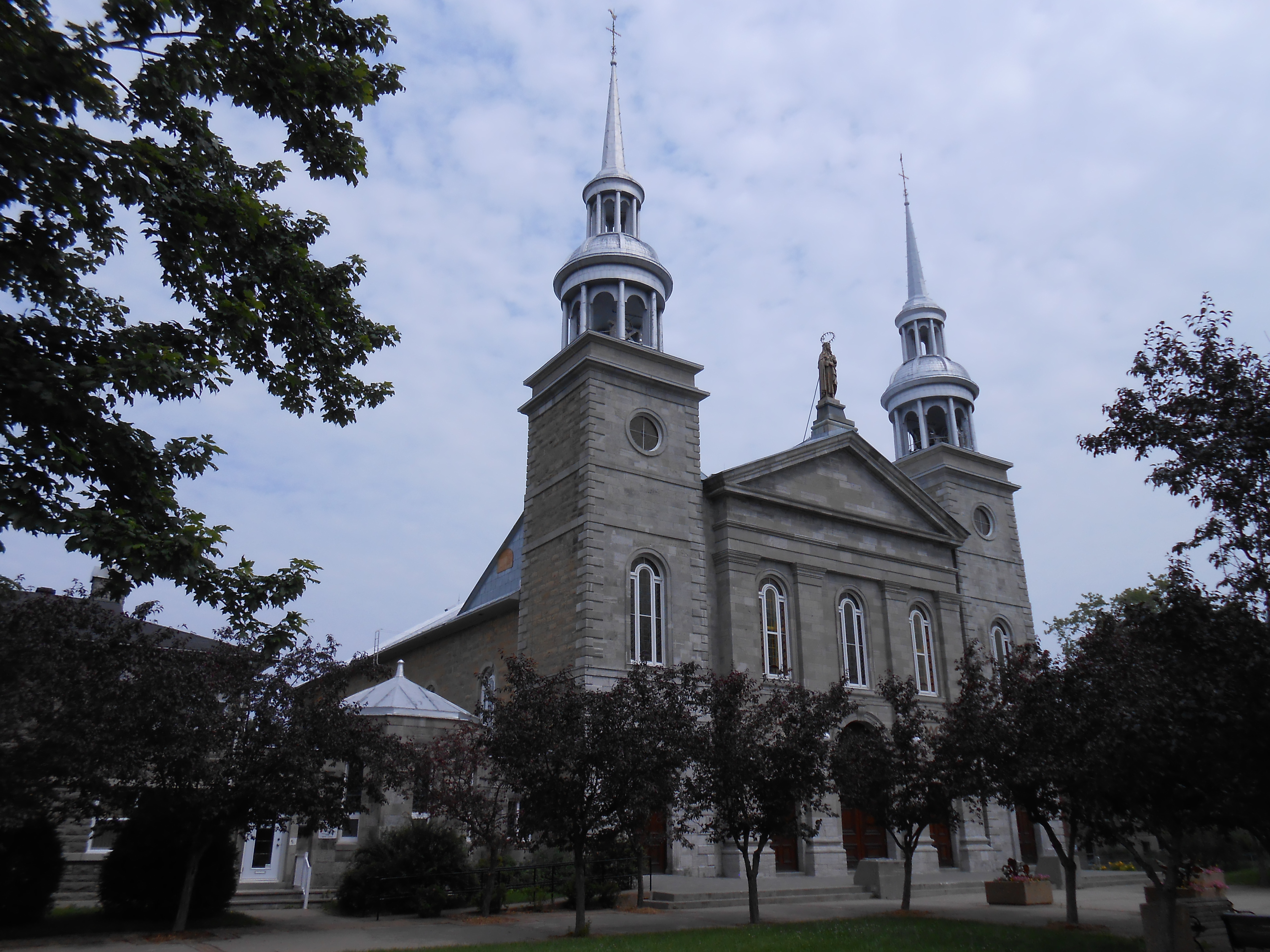
Sainte-Rose-de-Lima Church in 2013

Sainte-Rose (French pronunciation: [sɛ̃t ʁoz]) is a district in Laval, Quebec. It was incorporated as a village in 1850, and was a separate town until the municipal mergers on August 6, 1965 which amalgamated all the municipalities on Île Jésus into a single City of Laval.

Ste-Rose is best known for the parish church, erected 1740, which contains a Casavant Frères organ and hosts numerous concerts every year, and for "Vieux Ste-Rose", an area known for its old houses and its restaurants. Other districts that are also part of Sainte-Rose are Champenois (located between Boulevard Curé-Labelle and Autoroute 15, to the west of "Vieux Ste-Rose") and Champfleury, also known as Des Oiseaux (after the name of the district's main thoroughfare), to the south, near the border with Chomedey.

== Transportation ==
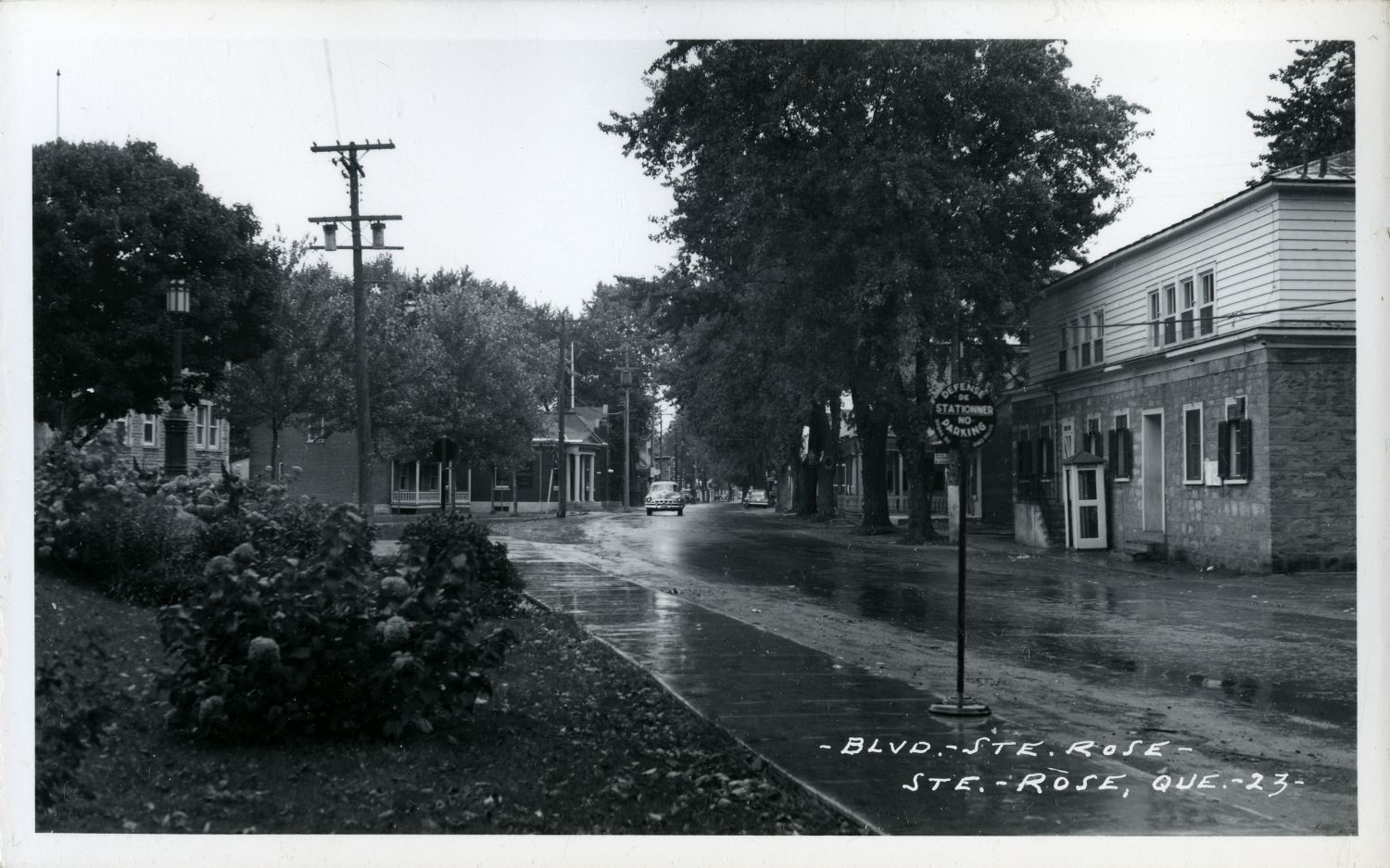
Sainte-Rose Boulevard in Sainte-Rose, Quebec on a postal card

It is served by city bus lines operated by the Société de transport de Laval and by commuter trains of the Saint-Jerome line of the Réseau de transport métropolitain (RTM). The Sainte-Rose station on that line is located just east of "Vieux Ste-Rose", on the border with Auteuil.

== Geography ==
Sainte-Rose is delimited on the north by the Rivière des Mille-Îles, on the west by Fabreville, on the north-east by Auteuil, on the south-east by Vimont and on the south by Chomedey.

== Education ==
Commission scolaire de Laval operates French-language public schools.

- Écoles secondaire Curé-Antoine-Labelle
- École primaire Demers
- École primaire Des Cardinaux
- École primaire Du Parc
- École primaire L’Envolée
- École primaire L’Aquarelle
- École primaire Villemaire
- École primaire Le Baluchon (alternative school)

Sir Wilfrid Laurier School Board operates English-language public schools. All sections of Laval are zoned to Laval Junior Academy and Laval Senior Academy.

== Trivia ==
- Antoine Labelle, priest and proponent of the settlement of the Laurentians, was born and lived there. His house is classified as an historic building.
- It is also the birthplace of painter Marc-Aurèle Fortin.
- Les Patriotes of the Lower Canada Rebellion gathered at a hotel on a road that is known today as the "rue des Patriotes" (street of the Patriots).
