= Duvernay, Quebec =

District of Laval, Quebec, Canada

Coordinates: 45.593°N 73.665°W

Duvernay (French pronunciation: [dyvɛʁnɛ]) is a district in the eastern part of Laval and was a separate city until the municipal mergers on August 6, 1965.

== Geography ==
It is located south-west of Saint-Francois, south-east of Auteuil, east of Vimont and Pont-Viau and around Sant-Vincent-de-Paul. The Rivière des Prairies passes to the south.

== Demographics ==
Home Language (2006)
Language	Population	Pct (%)
French only	18,740	66.91%
English only	5,515	19.69%
Unofficial language only	2,800	9.99%
Mixed responses and/or neither	950	3.39%

== Education ==
Commission scolaire de Laval operates French-language public schools.

- École secondaire Leblanc
- École primaire Des Ormeaux
- École primaire J.-Jean-Joubert
- École primaire Notre-Dame-du-Sourire
- École primaire Val-des-Arbres
  - As of 2017, it has about 430 students

Sir Wilfrid Laurier School Board (SWLSB) operates English-language public schools. Elementary schools serving sections of Duvernay:

- Genesis Elementary School
- Jules Verne Elementary School
- St. Paul Elementary School
  - As of 2017 it has about 430 students.

All sections of Laval are zoned to Laval Junior Academy and Laval Senior Academy

SWLSB previously had its headquarters in Duvernay.
