= École secondaire Georges-Vanier =

Location
- 3995 boulevard Lévesque Est; Laval, Quebec, H7E 2R3; Canada
- Coordinates: 45.5991°N 73.6533°W

Information
- School type: High school, Public
- School board: Commission scolaire de Laval
- Principal: Jean Godin
- Grades: Secondary 1-5
- Language: French
- Website: www.cslaval.qc.ca/georgesvanier/

École Secondaire Georges-Vanier (French pronunciation: [ekɔl səɡɔ̃dɛʁ ʒɔʁʒ vanje]) is a public high school in Laval, Quebec. It is named for Governor General of Canada Georges Vanier. It is a part of the Commission scolaire de Laval.

== Special programs ==
In 1994, a program named "Sport-études" was founded and created by Robert Lalande (1951-2013). It is still used at Georges-Vanier. It was a program that allowed athletes to train on a regular schedule while being able to go to school at the same time without having to make a sacrifice towards one. Today, this program includes a wide range of sports such as hockey, tennis, skiing, soccer and more.

In 2006, another program was founded by the music department. It explores theatrical and musical domains. Since, there has been multiple representation of shows, such as Rock n' Nonne, Starmania (Tycoon), and some shows that were created by the students and teachers.

== Notable alumni ==
- Eliezer Sherbatov (born 1991), Canadian-Israeli ice hockey player
