= Fabreville, Quebec =

Coordinates: 45°34′N 73°48′W

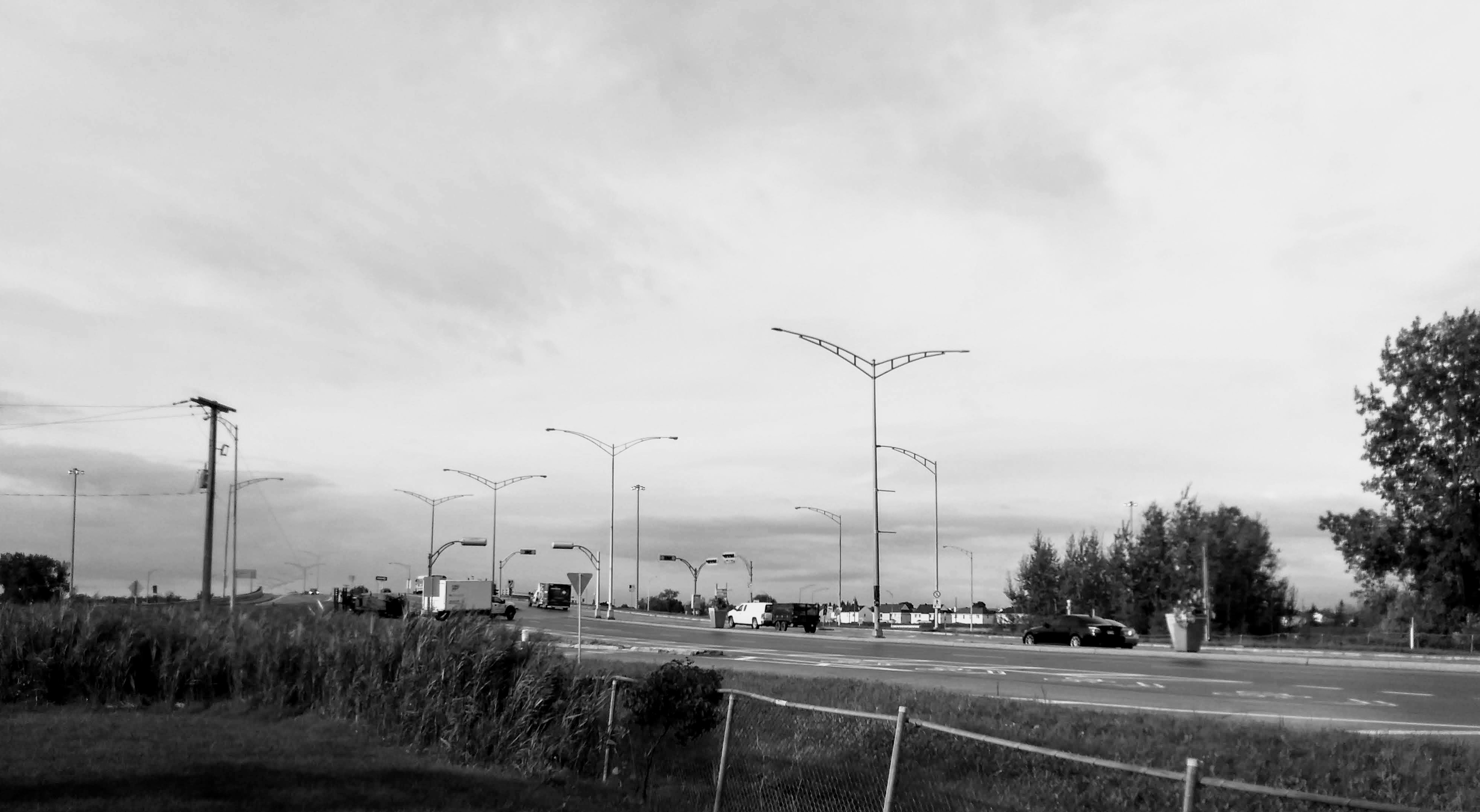
Fabreville, Quebec

Fabreville (French pronunciation: [fabʁəvil]) is a district in Laval, Quebec. It was a separate city until the municipal mergers on August 6, 1965.

== Geography ==
Fabreville is delimited north-west by the Rivière des Mille-Îles, north-east by Sainte-Rose, south-east by Chomedey, south by Sainte-Dorothée and west by Laval-Ouest.

The postal code for Fabreville is H7P and H7R.

== Education ==
Commission scolaire de Laval operates French-language public schools.

- École secondaire Poly-Jeunesse (junior high school)
- École primaire Coeur-Soleil
- École primaire Des Cèdres
- École primaire L’Orée-des-Bois
- École primaire La Source
- École primaire Le Petit-Prince
- École primaire Marc-Aurèle-Fortin
- École primaire Pépin

Sir Wilfrid Laurier School Board operates English-language public schools. Elementary schools serving sections of Fabreville:

- Our Lady of Peace Elementary School
- Twin Oaks Elementary School

All sections of Laval are zoned to Laval Junior Academy and Laval Senior Academy
