= Laval, Quebec =

City in Quebec, Canada

Laval
- City
- City of Laval; Ville de Laval
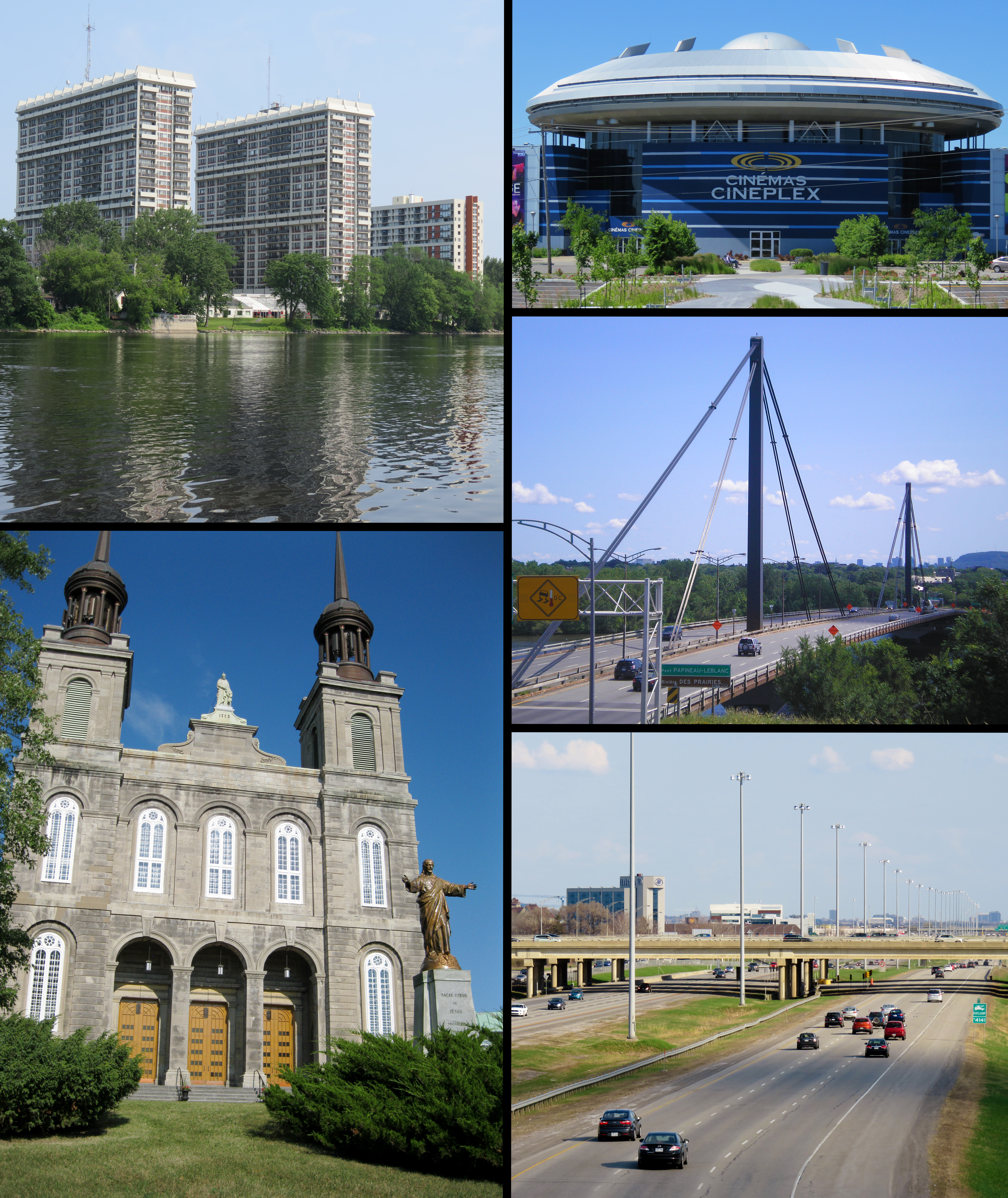
- From top, left to right: Le Domaine Bellerive apartment complex, Cinémas Cineplex Laval, Papineau-Leblanc Bridge, Saint-Vincent-de-Paul Catholic Parish, Quebec Autoroute 15 through Laval

- Flag Coat of arms Logo
- Motto(s): "Unité, progrès, grandeur" (French) "Unity, Progress, Greatness"
- Interactive map of Laval
- Location in Quebec Location in southern Quebec
- Coordinates: 45°35′N 73°45′W
- Country: Canada
- Province: Quebec
- Region: Laval
- RCM: None
- Constituted: 6 August 1965

Government
  - Type: Laval City Council
  - Mayor: Stéphane Boyer
  - Federal riding: Alfred-Pellan / Vimy / Laval— Les Îles / Marc-Aurèle-Fortin
  - Prov. riding: Chomedey / Fabre / Laval-des- Rapides / Mille-Îles / Sainte-Rose / Vimont

Area
  - Land: 247.23 km^{2} (95.46 sq mi)
- Elevation: 91 m (299 ft)

Population (2021)
  - Total: 443,893
  - Density: 1,710.9/km^{2} (4,431/sq mi)
  - Change 2011–2016: ▲5.3%
- Demonym(s): Lavallois, Lavalloise
- Time zone: UTC−5 (EST)
  - Summer (DST): UTC−4 (EDT)
- Postal code(s): H7A to H7Y
- Area codes: 450 and 579
- Website: www.laval.ca

Laval (Note: /ləˈvæl/ lə-VAL, French: [laval]) is a city in Quebec, Canada. It is in the southwest of the province, north of Montreal. It is the largest suburb of Greater Montreal, the third-largest city in the province after Montreal and Quebec City, and the thirteenth largest city in Canada, with a population of 443,192 in 2021.

Laval is geographically separated from the mainland to the north by the Rivière des Mille Îles, and from the Island of Montreal to the south by the Rivière des Prairies. Laval occupies all of Île Jésus as well as the Îles Laval.

Laval constitutes one of the 17 administrative regions of Quebec, with a region code of 13, as well as a territory equivalent to a regional county municipality (TE) and census division (CD) with geographical code 65. It also constitutes the judicial district of Laval. It is the smallest administrative region in the province by area.

== History ==
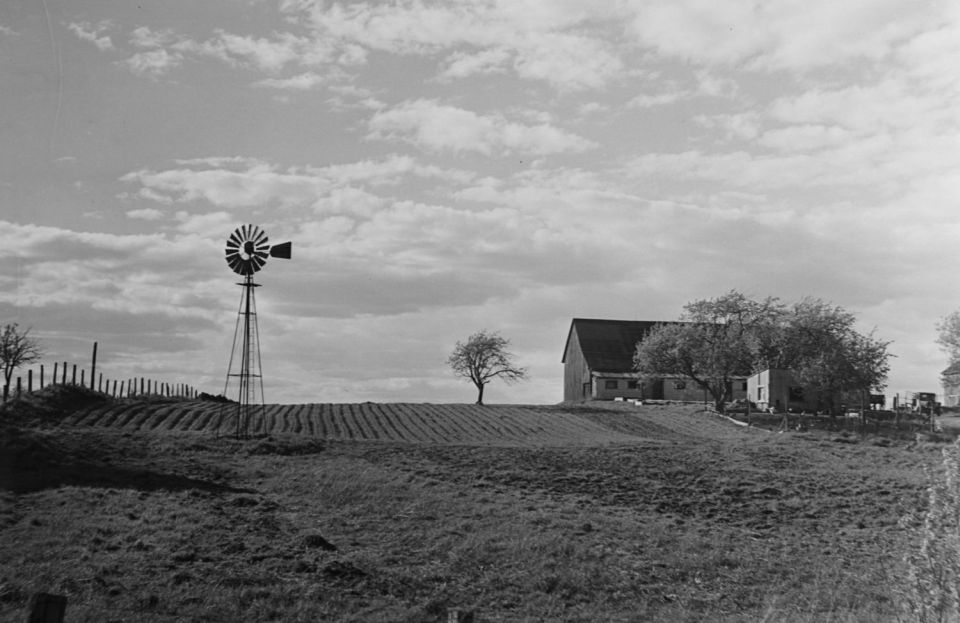
Farm in Laval-des-Rapides in 1941

The first European Settlers in Laval were Jesuits, who were granted a seigneury there in 1636. Agriculture first appeared in Laval in 1670. In 1675, François de Montmorency-Laval gained control of the seigneury. In 1702 a parish municipality was founded, and dedicated to Saint-François de Sales (not to be confused with the modern-day Saint-François-de-Sales in Saguenay–Lac-Saint-Jean).

In 1845, after nearly 200 years being of a rural nature, additional municipalities began to be created. The only built-up area on the island, Sainte-Rose, was incorporated as a village in 1850, and it remained the main community for the remainder of the century. With the dawn of the 20th century came urbanization. Laval-des-Rapides became Laval's first city in 1912, followed by L'Abord-à-Plouffe, which was granted village status three years later. Laval-sur-le-Lac was founded in the same year and had its tourist-based economy based on Montrealers. Laval began to grow throughout the following years because its proximity to Montreal made it an ideal suburb.

To deal with problems caused by urbanization, amalgamations occurred; L'Abord-à-Plouffe amalgamated with Renaud, Quebec and Saint-Martin, creating the city of Chomedey in 1961. The amalgamation turned out to be so successful for the municipalities involved that the Quebec government decided to amalgamate the whole island into a single city of Laval in 1965, not without controversy. Laval was named after the first owner of Île Jésus, François de Montmorency-Laval, the first Roman Catholic Bishop of Quebec. At the time, Laval had a population of 170,000. Laval became a Regional County Municipality in 1980. Until then, it had been the County of Laval.

The 14 municipalities, which existed prior to the incorporation of the amalgamated City of Laval on 6 August 1965, were:

- Auteuil
- Chomedey
- Duvernay
- Fabreville
- Îles-Laval
- Laval-des-Rapides
- Laval-Ouest
- Laval-sur-le-Lac
- Pont-Viau
- Sainte-Dorothée
- Sainte-Rose
- Saint-François
- Saint-Vincent-de-Paul
- Vimont

== Geography ==
The island has developed over time, with most of the urban area in the central region and along the south and west river banks.

Laval is bordered on the south by Montreal across the Rivière des Prairies, on the north by Les Moulins Regional County Municipality and by Thérèse-De Blainville Regional County Municipality and on the west by Deux-Montagnes Regional County Municipality across the Rivière des Mille Îles.

=== Climate ===
Laval experiences a four-season humid continental climate (Koppen: Dfb) with very warm summers and very cold winters with adequate precipitation year-round, though more so during summer and early fall.

Climate data for Sainte-Dorothée
Month	Jan	Feb	Mar	Apr	May	Jun	Jul	Aug	Sep	Oct	Nov	Dec	Year
Record high °C (°F)	13.5 (56.3)	15 (59)	18 (64)	30.5 (86.9)	33.3 (91.9)	34.0 (93.2)	34.0 (93.2)	35.0 (95.0)	31.1 (88.0)	27.8 (82.0)	20.0 (68.0)	11.5 (52.7)	35 (95)
Mean daily maximum °C (°F)	−5.8 (21.6)	−4.2 (24.4)	2.4 (36.3)	10.8 (51.4)	19.2 (66.6)	23.7 (74.7)	26.6 (79.9)	25.1 (77.2)	19.3 (66.7)	12.6 (54.7)	5.1 (41.2)	−2.6 (27.3)	11.0 (51.8)
Daily mean °C (°F)	−10.3 (13.5)	−9.0 (15.8)	−2.2 (28.0)	5.9 (42.6)	13.7 (56.7)	18.6 (65.5)	21.4 (70.5)	20.0 (68.0)	14.5 (58.1)	8.3 (46.9)	1.7 (35.1)	−6.5 (20.3)	6.3 (43.4)
Mean daily minimum °C (°F)	−14.8 (5.4)	−13.8 (7.2)	−6.8 (19.8)	1.0 (33.8)	8.2 (46.8)	13.4 (56.1)	16.2 (61.2)	14.9 (58.8)	9.8 (49.6)	4.0 (39.2)	−1.8 (28.8)	−10.3 (13.5)	1.7 (35.0)
Record low °C (°F)	−40.0 (−40.0)	−35.0 (−31.0)	−30.0 (−22.0)	−14.5 (5.9)	−3.9 (25.0)	2.0 (35.6)	6.0 (42.8)	3.3 (37.9)	−3.0 (26.6)	−6.1 (21.0)	−18.5 (−1.3)	−31.5 (−24.7)	−40.0 (−40.0)
Average precipitation mm (inches)	75.5 (2.97)	56.4 (2.22)	66.8 (2.63)	83.6 (3.29)	76.8 (3.02)	87.0 (3.43)	92.3 (3.63)	97.6 (3.84)	99.4 (3.91)	86.0 (3.39)	89.0 (3.50)	76.6 (3.02)	987 (38.85)
Average snowfall cm (inches)	44.6 (17.6)	34.5 (13.6)	28.2 (11.1)	7.6 (3.0)	0.2 (0.1)	0.0 (0.0)	0.0 (0.0)	0.0 (0.0)	0.0 (0.0)	1.2 (0.5)	15.0 (5.9)	42.7 (16.8)	173.8 (68.4)
Average precipitation days (≥ 0.2)	14.1	11.1	11.5	12.4	13.1	13.5	12.1	13.4	13.1	13.6	13.3	14.0	155.2
Source: Environment Canada

== Demographics ==
Historical population
Year	Pop.	±%
1871	9,472	—
1881	9,462	−0.1%
1891	9,436	−0.3%
1901	10,248	+8.6%
1911	11,407	+11.3%
1921	14,005	+22.8%
1931	16,150	+15.3%
1941	21,631	+33.9%
1951	37,843	+74.9%
1956	69,410	+83.4%
1961	124,741	+79.7%
1966	196,088	+57.2%
1971	228,010	+16.3%
1976	246,243	+8.0%
1981	268,335	+9.0%
1986	284,164	+5.9%
1991	314,398	+10.6%
1996	330,393	+5.1%
2001	343,005	+3.8%
2006	368,709	+7.5%
2011	401,553	+8.9%
2016	422,993	+5.3%
2021	438,366	+3.6%

In the 2021 Census of Population conducted by Statistics Canada, Laval had a population of 438,366 living in 169,785 of its 176,115 total private dwellings, a change of 3.6% from its 2016 population of 422,993. With a land area of 246.13 km^{2} (95.03 sq mi), it had a population density of 1,781.0/km^{2} (4,612.9/sq mi) in 2021. According to the 2016 Census, the population of Laval was an estimated 422,993, a 5.3 percent increase from the earlier census in 2011. Women constituted 51.4% of the total population. Children under 14 years of age totalled 17.4%, while 17.2% of the population was of retirement age (65 years of age and older). The median age was calculated as 41.9 years.

=== Ethnicity ===
Largest ethnic origin in Laval by census tract based on the 2021 census

The largest ethnicities in Laval as per the 2021 census are French (14.2%), Italian (8.9%), Lebanese (5.2%), Haitian (5.1%), Greek (4.7%), and Armenian (2.9%).

Panethnic groups in the City of Laval (2001−2021)
Panethnic group	2021		2016		2011		2006		2001	
Panethnic group	Pop.	%	Pop.	%	Pop.	%	Pop.	%	Pop.	%
European (Note: Statistic includes all persons that did not make up part of a visible minority or an indigenous identity.)	285,970	66.57%	301,065	73.28%	309,180	78.73%	311,495	85.43%	308,820	91.1%
Middle Eastern (Note: Statistic includes total responses of "West Asian" and "Arab" under visible minority section on census.)	54,815	12.76%	38,060	9.26%	26,490	6.75%	15,710	4.31%	8,040	2.37%
African	38,420	8.94%	32,095	7.81%	24,225	6.17%	16,895	4.63%	10,875	3.21%
Latin American	15,020	3.5%	12,660	3.08%	9,855	2.51%	6,285	1.72%	2,870	0.85%
South Asian	12,495	2.91%	8,800	2.14%	6,650	1.69%	3,335	0.91%	1,475	0.44%
Southeast Asian (Note: Statistic includes total responses of "Filipino" and "Southeast Asian" under visible minority section on census.)	9,780	2.28%	8,610	2.1%	8,565	2.18%	5,990	1.64%	3,665	1.08%
East Asian (Note: Statistic includes total responses of "Chinese", "Korean", and "Japanese" under visible minority section on census.)	5,085	1.18%	4,205	1.02%	3,505	0.89%	2,490	0.68%	1,755	0.52%
Indigenous	3,310	0.77%	2,530	0.62%	2,330	0.59%	1,405	0.39%	755	0.22%
Other/Multiracial (Note: Statistic includes total responses of "Visible minority, n.i.e." and "Multiple visible minorities" under visible minority section on census.)	4,655	1.08%	2,820	0.69%	1,925	0.49%	1,015	0.28%	745	0.22%
Total responses	429,555	97.99%	410,850	97.13%	392,725	97.8%	364,625	98.89%	339,005	98.83%
Total population	438,366	100%	422,993	100%	401,553	100%	368,709	100%	343,005	100%
Note: Totals greater than 100% due to multiple origin responses

=== Immigration ===
Immigrants by country of birth (2016 Census)
Rank	Country	Population
1	Lebanon	12,420
2	Haiti	12,015
3	Morocco	7,880
4	Algeria	6,530
5	Greece	5,940
6	Italy	5,690
7	Syria	5,465
8	Romania	5,255
9	France	3,325
10	Portugal	3,145

=== Language ===
.

Canada Census Mother Tongue – Laval, Quebec
Census Year	Total Responses	French			English			French & English			Other		
Census Year	Total Responses	Count	Trend	Pop %	Count	Trend	Pop %	Count	Trend	Pop %	Count	Trend	Pop %
2021	434,645	226,675	▼4.64%	52.15%	34,175	▲11.35%	7.86%	7,770	▲76.2%	1.05%	143,300	▲9.19%	32.9%
2016	417,995	237,430	▼1.73%	56.80%	30,295	▲9.45%	7.25%	4,410	▲16.82%	1.05%	131,240	▲15.97%	31.39%
2011	397,570	241,615	▼0.2%	60.77%	27,680	▲9.51%	6.96%	3,775	▲58.94%	0.95%	113,160	▲19.34%	28.46%
2006	368,709	242,155	▼2.72%	66.41%	25,275	▲23.08%	6.85%	2,375	▼14.41%	0.64%	94,815	▲42%	25.72%
2001	339,000	248,925	▲1.68%	73.42%	20,535	▲0.96%	6.05%	2,775	▲4.52%	0.82%	66,775	▲22.25%	19.69%
1996	326,605	244,800	n/a	74.95%	20,340	n/a	6.22%	2,655	n/a	0.81%	54,620	n/a	16.72%

=== Religion ===
According to the 2021 census, religious groups in Laval included:

- Christianity (280,720 people or 65.4%)
- Irreligious (77,165; 18.0%)
- Islam (55,620; 12.9%)
- Buddhism (5,940; 1.4%)
- Hinduism (4,140; 1.0%)
- Judaism (2,435; 0.6%)
- Sikhism (2,235; 0.5%)
- Indigenous Spirituality (10; less than 0.1%)
- Other (1,280; 0.3%)

== Economy ==
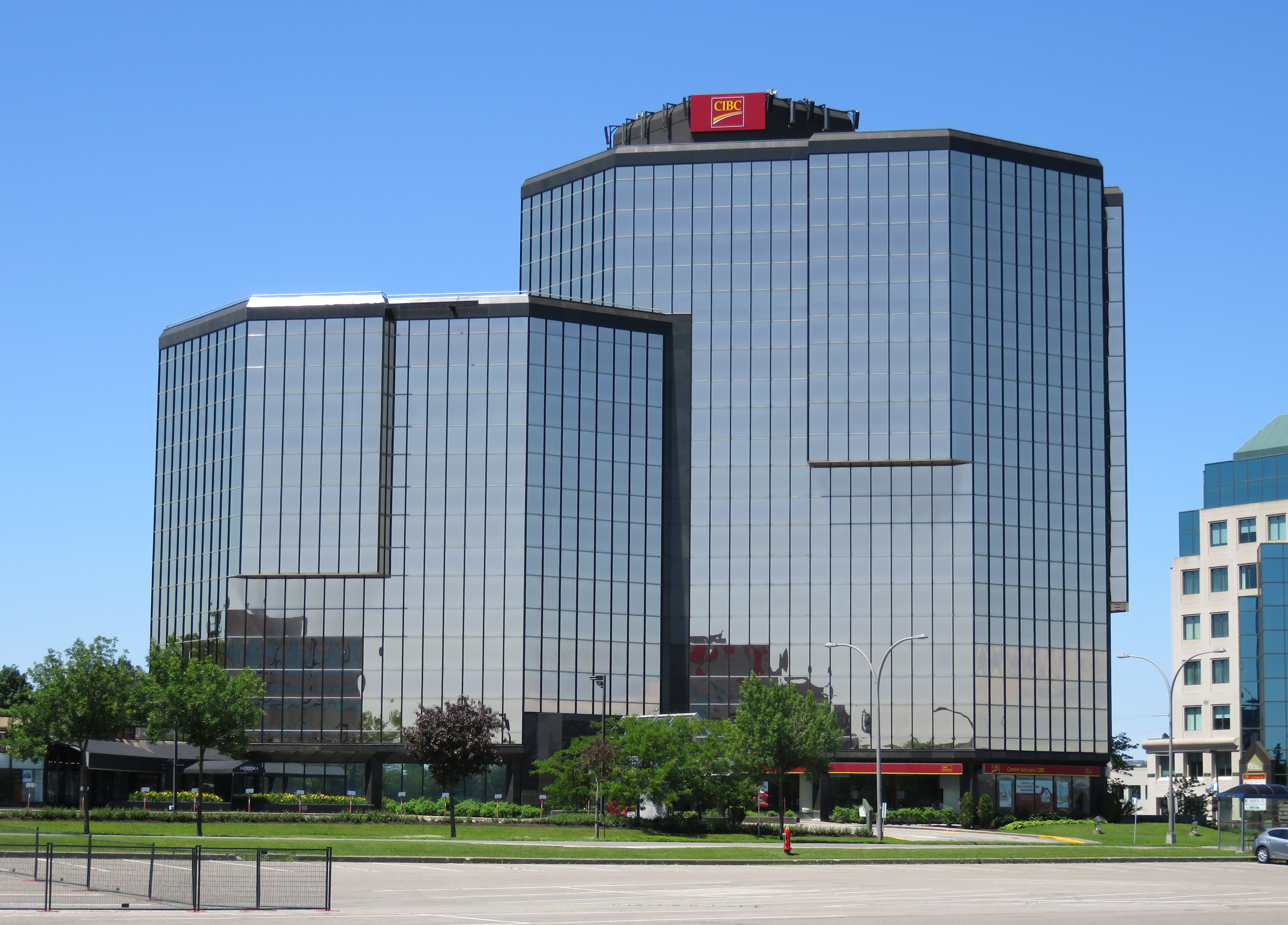
Office buildings in Laval

Laval's diverse economy is centred around the technology, pharmaceutical, industrial and retail sectors. It has many pharmaceutical laboratories but also stone quarries and a persistent agricultural sector. Long seen as a bedroom community, Laval has diversified its economy, especially in the retail sector, developing numerous shopping malls, warehouses and various retail stores. Laval has four different industrial parks.

The first is Industrial Park Centre, in the heart of Laval at the corner of St. Martin West and Industriel Blvd. One of the largest municipal industrial parks in Quebec, the Industrial Park Centre boasts the highest concentration of manufacturing companies in Laval: 1,024 at last count, and 22,378 employees. The park still has 1,300,643 m^{2} (14,000,005 sq ft) of space available.

The second, the Autoroute 25 Industrial Park is at the crossroads of the metropolitan road network. Inaugurated in 2001, this new industrial municipal space has been a tremendous success, boasting an 80% occupancy rate. Laval is studying the possibility of expanding this park in the next few years.

The third, known as Industrial Park East, is in the neighbourhood of Saint-Vincent-de-Paul. This park has reached full capacity with a 100% occupancy rate. Industrial Park East is currently part of a municipal program to revitalize municipal services and public utilities. Laval is working with a private developer on an expansion project for the park that should be announced in the near future.

The fourth industrial park, the Laval Science and High Technology Park is located along Rivière des Prairies and Autoroute 15. It is a science campus that houses the Biotech City and the Information Technology Development Centre (ITDC). Nearly 500,000 square metres (5,400,000 sq ft) of space are available for development. The Biotech City spans the entire territory of the Laval Science and High Technology Park and is a unique concept in Canada in that its residents comprise both universities and companies.

Created in 1995, Laval Technopole is a nonprofit organization that has the objective to promote the economic growth of Laval by attracting and supporting new business and investments located in its 5 territory poles: Biopole, e-Pol, Agropole, industrial pole and Leisure/tourism.

Alimentation Couche-Tard has its headquarters in Laval.

Poles in figures (excluding Leisure and tourism)
Agropole	Industrial Pole	Biopole	E-Pole
1,750 companies	624 companies	More than 80 firms	264 businesses
15,800 jobs	16,000 jobs	Over one billion $ invested since 2001	4,370 jobs
Main sectors: Transformation; Food production; Agriculture; Restaurant industry; Wholesale and retail	Main sectors: Metal products; Printing; Machinery; furnitures; Clothing; Rubber; Plastic	Main sectors: Biotechnology; Pharmaceutical; Medical Technology	Main sectors: Software; Manufacture; Service

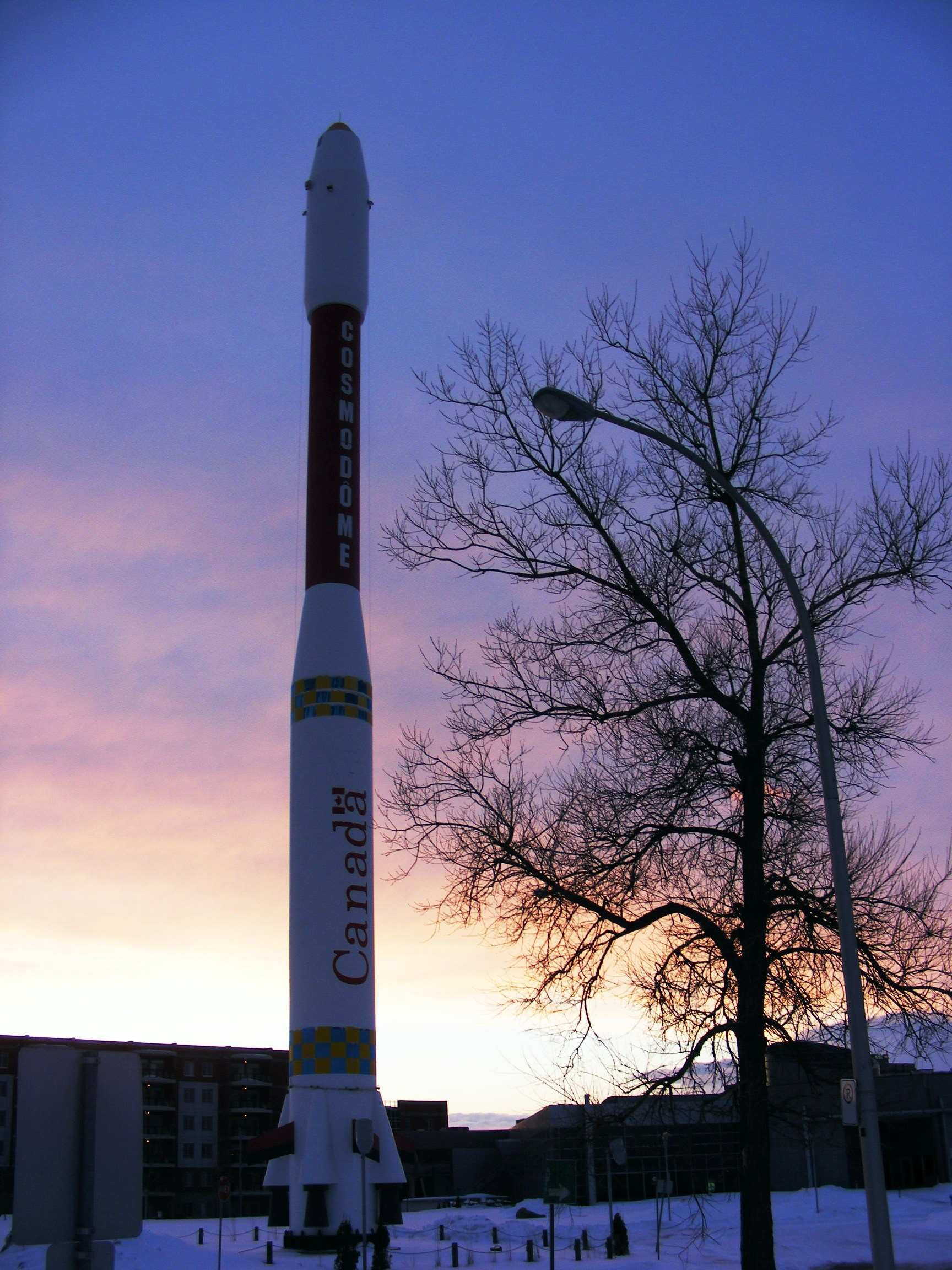
The Cosmodome is a major local attraction.

== Sport ==
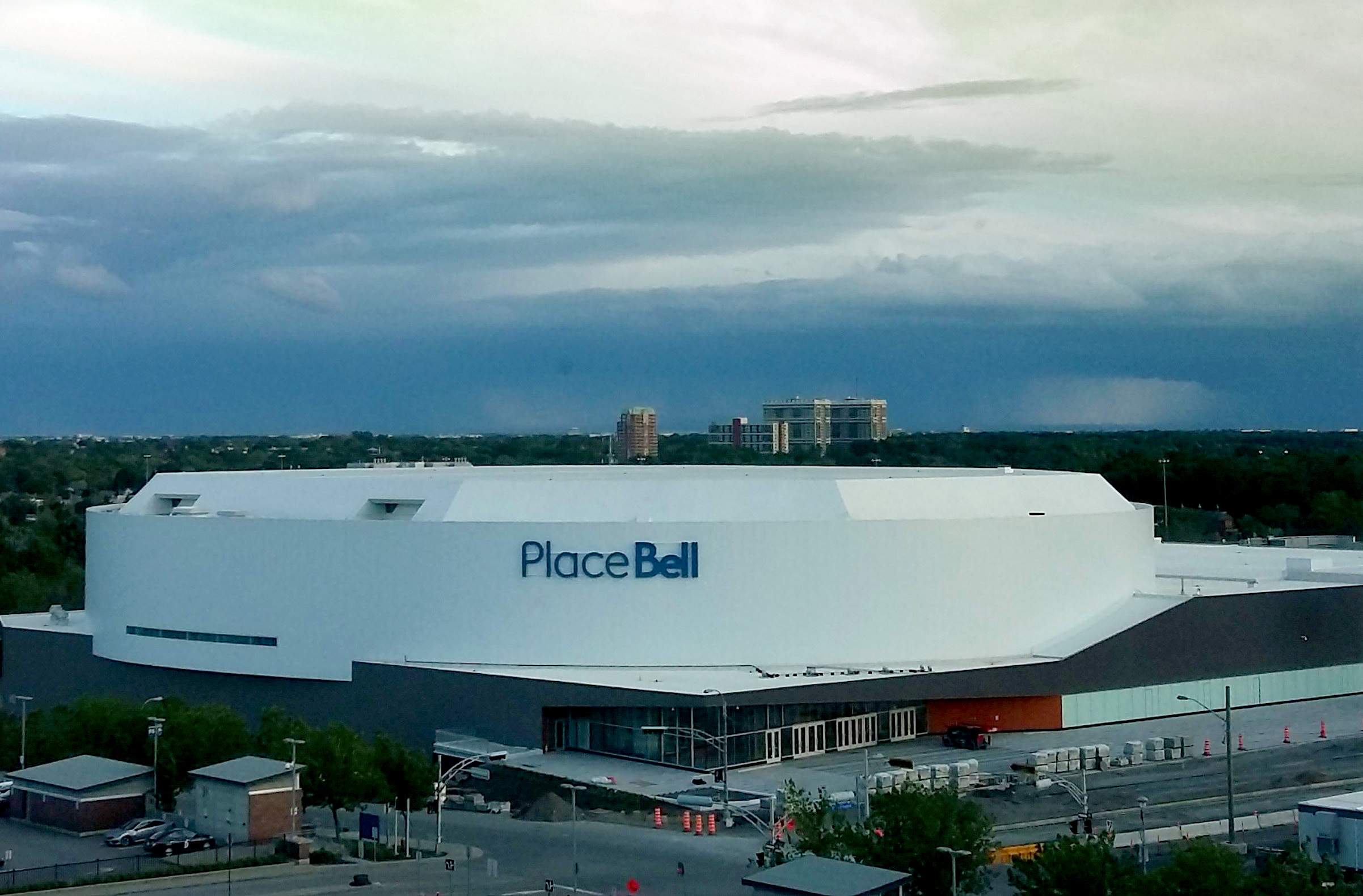
Place Bell, home to the Laval Rocket and Montréal Victoire

Laval was the host-city of the "Jeux du Québec" held in summer 1991 and of the Canadian Hockey League's 1994 Memorial Cup. Laval became home to the Montreal Canadiens' American Hockey League affiliate the Laval Rocket, starting in the 2017–18 season.

Sports teams of Laval
Team	Sport	League	Venue	Established	Disestablished	Championships
Associés de Laval	Baseball	Ligue de Baseball Élite du Québec	Parc Montmorency	1983	2015	5
Sabercats Rive-Nord	Canadian football	Quebec Junior Football League	Parc Cartier			
Laval Comets	Women's soccer	W-League	Centre Sportif Bois-de-Boulogne	2006	2016	0
Laval Dynamites	Soccer	Canadian Soccer League	Centre Sportif Bois-de-Boulogne	2001	2007	0
Laval Rocket	Ice hockey	American Hockey League	Place Bell	1969 (Note: the sports franchise was formed in 1969 and was relocated to Laval in 2017)		0
Les Pétroliers du Nord	Ice hockey	Ligue Nord-Américaine de Hockey	Colisée de Laval	2018 (Note: the sports franchise was formed in 2018 and was relocated to Laval for the 2019–20 season)		0
Montreal Roses FC	Women's soccer	Northern Super League	Centre Sportif Bois-de-Boulogne	2023		0
Montréal Victoire	Ice hockey	Professional Women's Hockey League	Place Bell	2023		0
FC Supra du Québec	Soccer	Canadian Premier League	Centre Sportif Bois-de-Boulogne	2025		0

== Government ==
=== Municipal politics ===
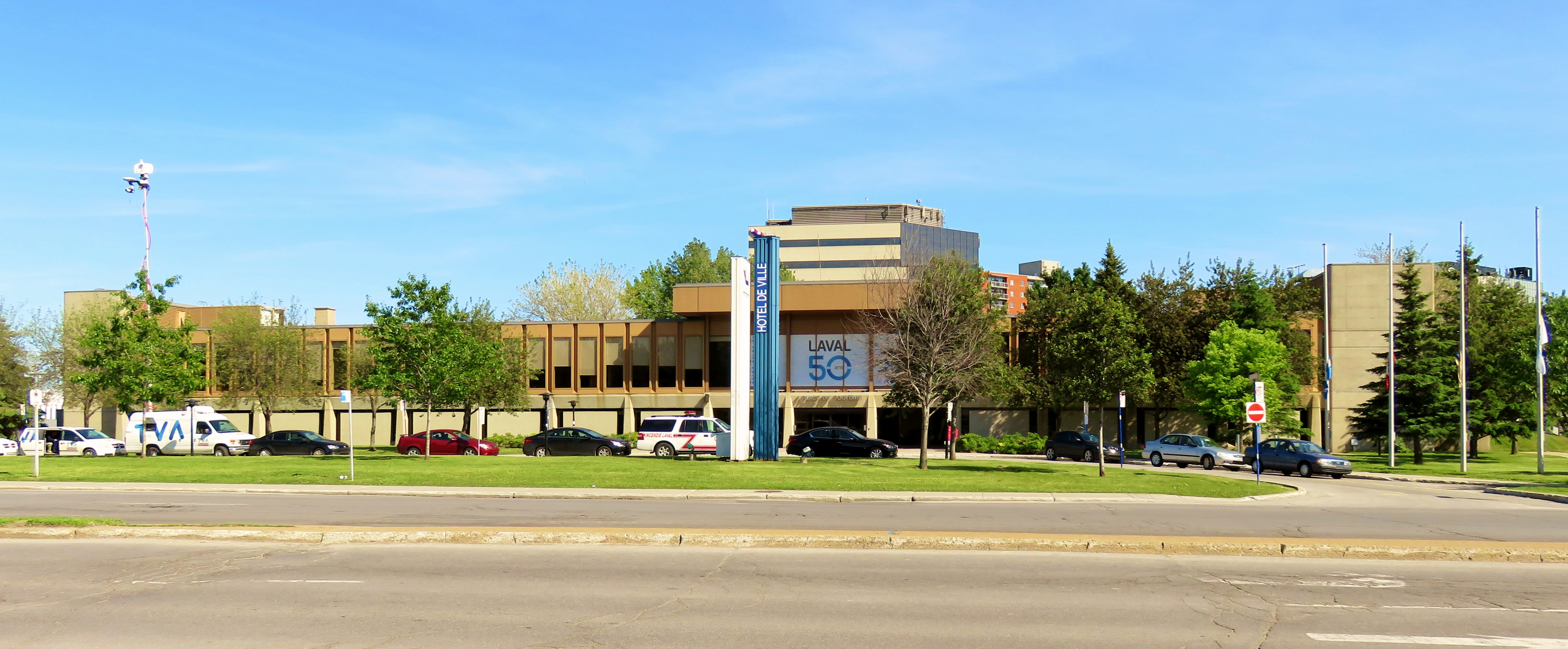
Laval City Hall

The city's longtime mayor, Gilles Vaillancourt, resigned on 9 November 2012, following allegations of corruption made against him in hearings of the provincial Charbonneau Commission. City councillor Basile Angelopoulos served as acting mayor until Alexandre Duplessis was selected in a council vote on 23 November. Duplessis, in turn, stepped down after just seven months in office after facing allegations of being implicated in a prostitution investigation; he was succeeded by city councillor Martine Beaugrand until the city's new mayor, Marc Demers, was elected in the 2013 municipal election.

Past mayors have been:

- Jean-Noël Lavoie (founding mayor), 1965
- Jacques Tétreault, 1965–1973
- Lucien Paiement, 1973–1981
- Claude Lefebvre, 1981–1989
- Gilles Vaillancourt, 1989–2012
- Alexandre Duplessis, 2012–2013
- Martine Beaugrand, 2013
- Marc Demers, 2013–2021
- Stéphane Boyer, 2021–present

On 3 June 2013, the provincial government of Pauline Marois placed the city under trusteeship due to the ongoing corruption scandal affecting the city. Florent Gagné, a former head of the Sûreté du Québec, will serve as the city's head trustee, with responsibility for reviewing and approving or rejecting all decisions made by city council. Municipal Affairs Minister Sylvain Gaudreault said that Laval's Mayor Alexandre Duplessis and his council will continue to serve, but council decisions must be approved by the trustees. Duplessis, in turn, resigned as mayor on 28 June 2013, after being implicated in a separate prostitution allegation.

==== Flag, seal and motto ====
On a white-yellow background, the emblem of Laval illustrates the modernism of a city in full expansion. The sign of the city symbolizes the "L" of Laval.

The colours also have a significant meaning:

- Dark red represents the affluence and economic potential of Laval.
- Blue symbolizes the quality of life and the installation of a human city.

The "L" of Laval is made of cubes that represent the development of Laval.

The letters of the Laval signature are related one to the other to point out the merger of the 14 municipalities of Jesus island in 1965.

The logo (that is on the flag) has existed since the 1980s and the flag since the 1990s.

=== Federal and provincial politics ===
Laval federal election results
Year	Liberal		Conservative		Bloc Québécois		New Democratic		Green	
2021	48%	97,592	14%	28,900	25%	50,921	8%	17,027	1%	1,700
2019	47%	103,401	12%	26,107	27%	60,193	8%	18,432	4%	8,500
2015	45%	97,819	14%	29,830	17%	37,455	22%	48,153	2%	4,297
2011	19%	35,525	13%	23,222	20%	36,948	45%	82,924	2%	3,445
2008	27%	49,327	15%	28,361	41%	75,819	12%	22,750	3%	6,281

Laval provincial election results
Year	CAQ		Liberal		QC solidaire		Parti Québécois	
2022	33%	64,625	30%	59,888	12%	24,633	11%	21,448
2018	32%	62,520	37%	71,677	12%	23,747	13%	25,430
2014	18%	39,560	53%	118,235	5%	10,904	23%	51,535

Federally, prior to 1984 Laval had been a bastion of Liberal support. From 1984 to 1993 the Conservative dominated Laval but have not won a seat since.Since the 90's Laval has been a battleground area between the Quebec separatist parties (the Bloc Québécois federally and the Parti Québécois provincially) and the federalist parties (various parties federally and the Quebec Liberal Party provincially). In 2011, amid an NDP surge in the province they swept all 4 seats in Laval for the first and only time. Since the 2015 election the Liberals have held all seats.

Provincially the other parts of Laval have drifted to the provincial Liberals in recent years. While the PQ held every Laval riding except Chomedey (which voted overwhelmingly to not separate in the 1995 Quebec referendum) during their second stint in government between 1994 and 2003. The Liberals won every Laval riding in 2003, 2007, and 2008. During the 2012 election, the PQ saw some gains in Laval when they captured 2 seats, but both returned to the Liberal fold during the 2014 election. During the 2018 election amid a rise of the CAQ, the Liberals held their own in the Laval losing only 1 seat to the CAQ. In the 2022 election the CAQ captured 3 more seats in Laval netting them 4 out of 6 seats and ending the dominance of the Liberals in Laval since the 2003 election. The Conservative Party of Quebec saw its vote share jump from just under 2% in 2018 to third place with just under 13%.

== Infrastructure ==
=== Roads ===
Highways

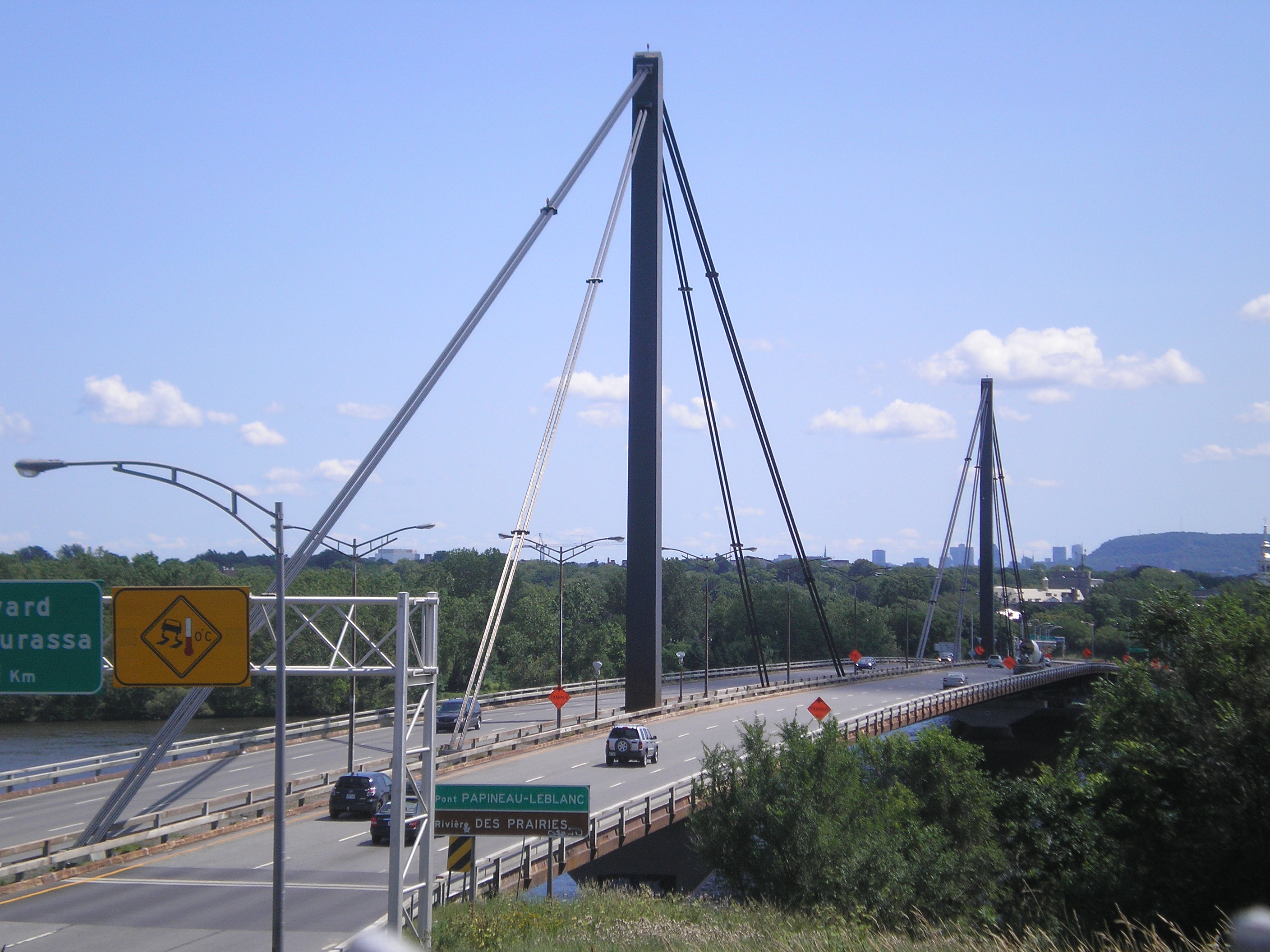
The Papineau-Leblanc Bridge links Laval to the Ahuntsic-Cartierville borough of Montreal.

- A-13 (Chomedey Highway) – Montreal to Boisbriand
- A-15 (Laurentian Highway) – New York state to Sainte-Agathe-des-Monts
- A-19 (Papineau Highway) – Montreal to Boulevard Dagenais, continues as Route 335 to Bois-des-Filion and beyond
- A-25 – Boucherville to Saint-Esprit via Montreal and the A-440 (Laval)
- A-440 (Autoroute Jean-Noël-Lavoie) – Laval

Provincial routes

- Route 117 – Montreal to Ontario Highway 66 past Rouyn-Noranda
- Route 125 – Montreal to Saint-Donat
- Route 148 – Laval to Pembroke, Ontario
- Route 335 – Montreal to the Lanaudière region past Saint-Calixte

Incidents

- 2000 Boulevard du Souvenir overpass collapse: On 18 June 2000, during renovations to the Souvenir Boulevard overpass over Highway 15, the southern section collapsed onto the highway, causing the death of one person.
- De la Concorde Overpass collapse: On 30 September 2006, the De la Concorde overpass over Autoroute 19 suddenly collapsed killing five people.

=== Public transit ===
Montreal Metro

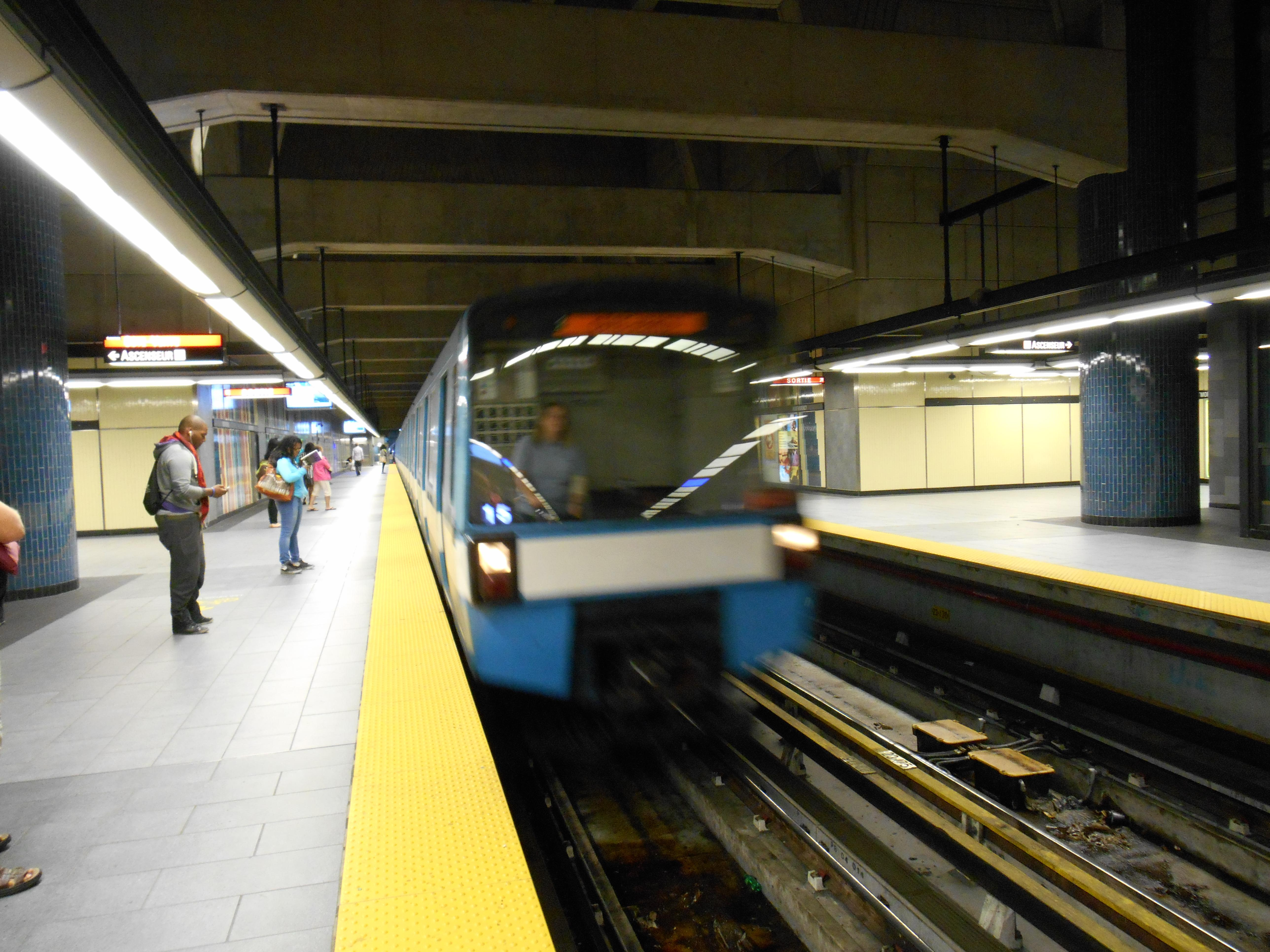
A train arriving at Montmorency Station in the Montreal Metro

In April 2007, the Montreal Metro was extended to Laval with three stations. The long-awaited stations were begun in 2003 and completed in April 2007, two months ahead of the revised schedule, at a cost of C$803 million, funded entirely by the Quebec government. The stations are Cartier, De la Concorde, and Montmorency. The arrival of the Metro in Laval was long-awaited as it was first promised in the 1960s. Former mayor, Gilles Vaillancourt, announced his wish to loop the Orange Line from Montmorency to Côte-Vertu stations with the addition of six new stations (three in Laval and another three in Montreal). He proposed that Transports Quebec, the provincial transport department, set aside C$100 million annually to fund the project, which was expected to cost upwards of $1.5 billion.

Réseau express métropolitain

The Réseau express métropolitain (REM) light metro system serves the western tip of Laval with two stations: Île-Bigras and Sainte-Dorothée. The REM through Laval was converted from the former Deux-Montagnes commuter train line.

Commuter rail

The Exo public transit agency's Saint-Jérôme commuter train line traverses the island, connecting Laval to downtown Montreal. There are currently three train stations in Laval: De la Concorde (an intermodal station offering transfer to the metro), Vimont and Sainte-Rose.

Buses

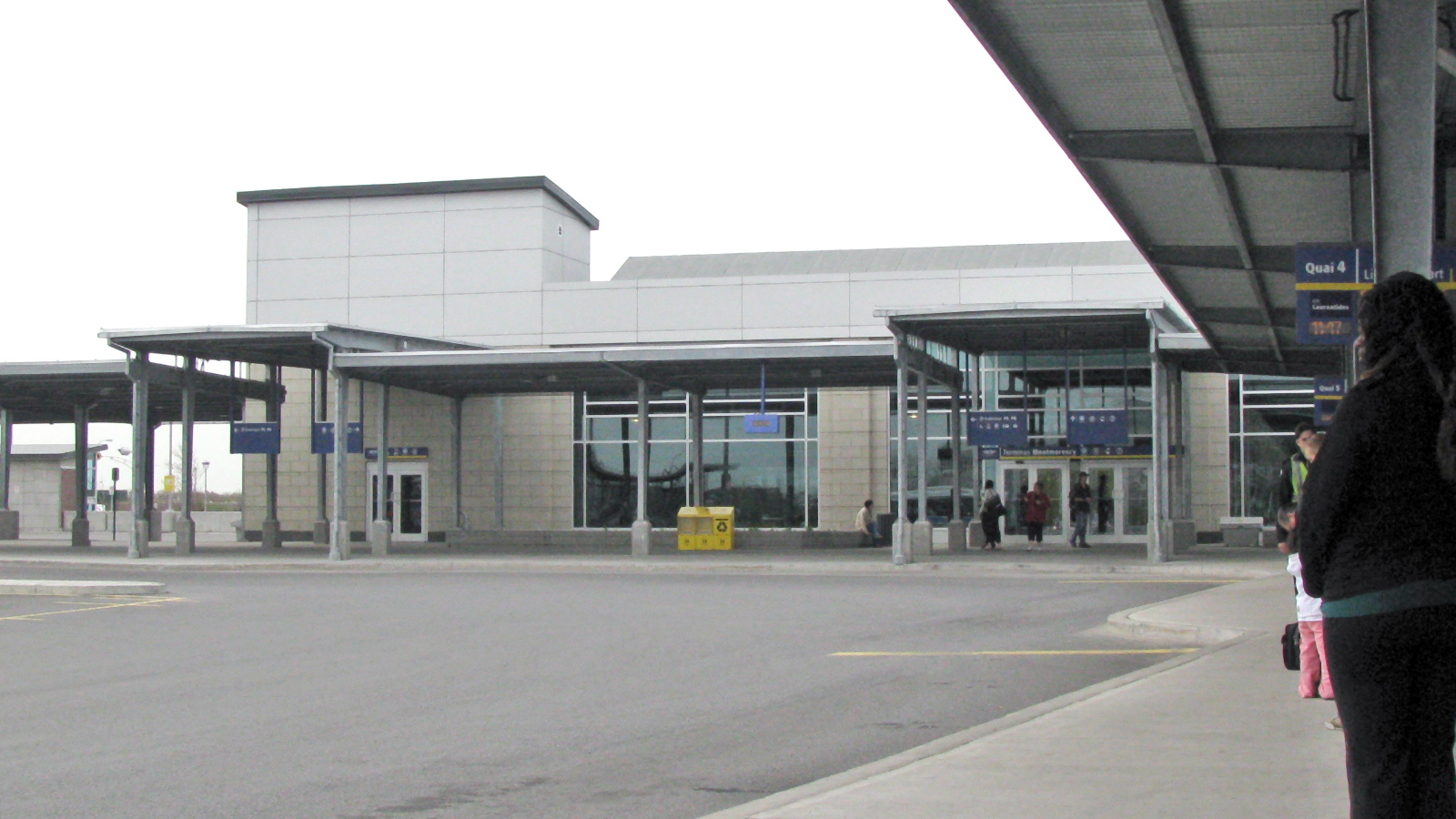
Montmorency Terminus

The Société de transport de Laval (STL) provides local bus service in Laval. The STL's network consists of 35 regular lines, two rush hour lines, two trainbus lines, three express lines, one community circuit and several taxi lines.

There are reserved lanes for buses and taxis on Chomedey Blvd between Le Carrefour Blvd and the Des Prairies River (Lachapelle Bridge) and beyond as well as along boulevard des Laurentides between rue Proulx and boulevard Cartier (the reserved lane, in this case for buses only, continues onto the Pont Viau bridge into Montreal until the Terminus Laval at the Henri-Bourassa Metro station). Most buses that use the reserved lane end their journey at the Cartier Metro station. The AMT and the City of Laval have developed reserved bus and taxi lanes on Notre-Dame Boulevard between Vincent Massey Street and Place Alton-Goldbloom and another on De la Concorde Blvd between De l'Avenir and Laval Blvds, as well as between Ampere Ave and Roanne St. These reserved lanes (Notre-Dame and De la Concorde are the same boulevard but change name where they meet under Autoroute 15) opened shortly after 31 October 2007.

Air transport

The city is served by both Montréal–Trudeau International Airport which is located 29 km (18 mi) south west of Laval.

== Education ==
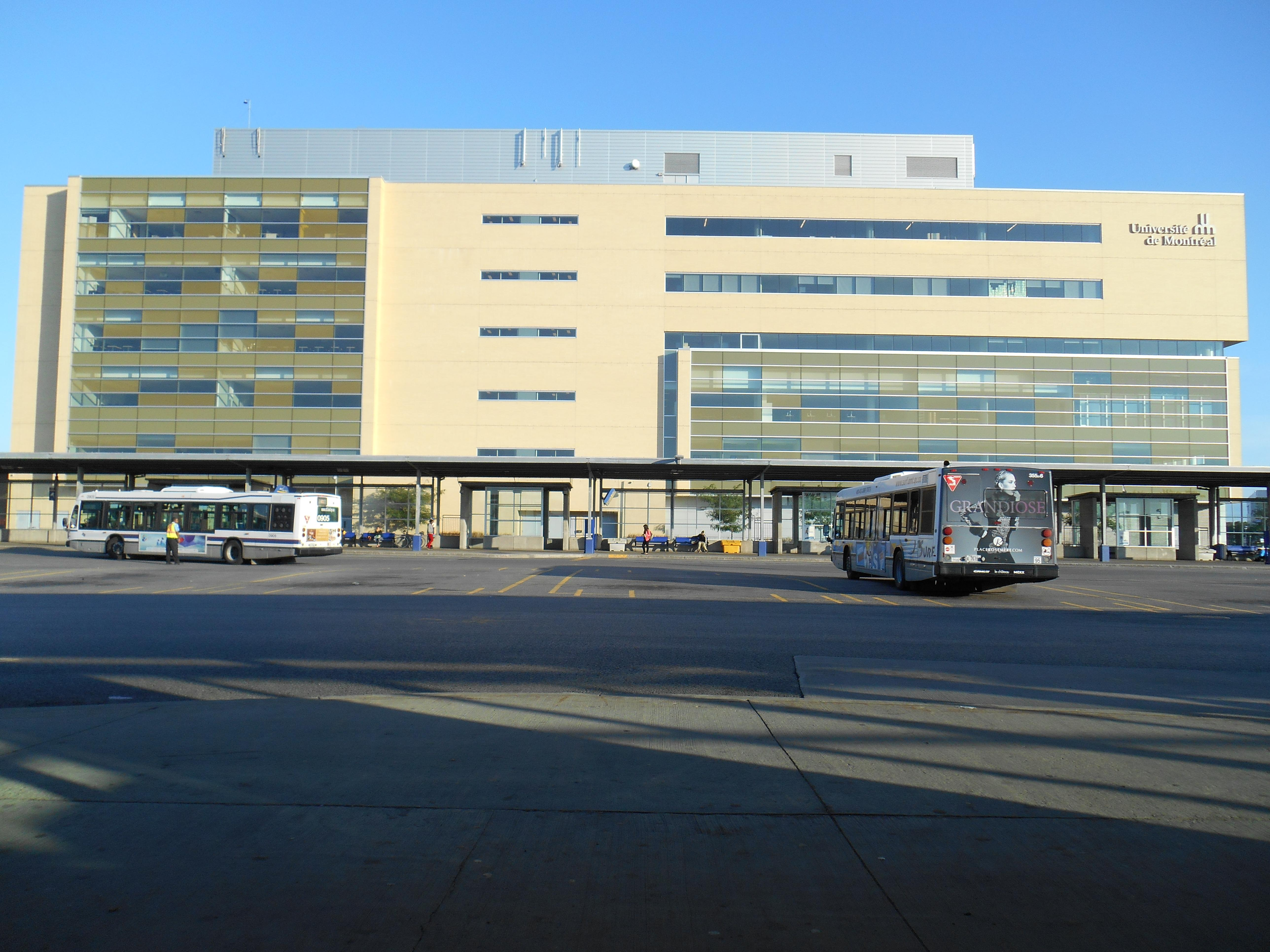
The Laval campus of the Université de Montréal

Laval is home to a variety of vocational/technical centres, colleges and universities, including:

- College Montmorency
- CDI College
- Centre de formation Compétences-2000
- Centre de formation en métallurgie de Laval
- Chomedey Centre
- Centre de formation horticole de Laval
- Centre de formation Paul-Émile-Dufresne
- Herzing College
- École hôtelière de Laval
- École polymécanique de Laval
- Centre de formation Le Chantier
- Institut de protection contre les incendies du Québec
- Université de Montréal (Laval campus)
- Delta College
- Université du Québec à Montréal (Laval campus)

The city has two separate school boards serving Laval: the Centre de services scolaire de Laval (formerly the Commission scolaire de Laval) for French-speaking students and the Sir Wilfrid Laurier School Board for English-speaking students. There is one community English-language high school in the city: Laval Senior Academy, created on 1 July 2015 by the merger of Laval Liberty High School and Laurier Senior High School.

North Star Academy Laval is the only private English high school in Laval. They offer secondary 1 to 5 and the possibility to do a grade 12 diploma from Ontario via their online platform.

== Media ==
Laval is served by media from Montreal, however it does have some of its own regional media outlets.

Two radio stations are licensed to serve the city: CJLV 1570 AM "Radio Mieux-être" (formerly CFAV) and CFGL 105.7 FM "Rythme FM".

Additionally, there are three major newspapers in Laval: the bi-weekly English-language The Laval News, the bi-weekly French-language Le Courrier Laval and the weekly French-language L'Écho de Laval.

One television community channel operates on Laval's territory, Télévision régionale de Laval, as part of Videotron cable's VOX network.

== Sister cities ==
Laval is twinned with:

- Botoșani, Romania
- Klagenfurt, Austria
- Laval, France
- Nice, France
- Pedro Aguirre Cerda, Chile
- Ribeira Grande, Portugal
- San Salvador, El Salvador

=== Friendship and cooperation ===
Laval also cooperates with:

- Grenoble, France
- Markham, Canada
- Mudanjiang, China
- Padua Province, Italy
- Petah Tikva, Israel
- Saskatoon, Canada

== See also ==
- Bibliothèque de Laval
- List of crossings of the Rivière des Mille Îles
- List of crossings of the Rivière des Prairies
- List of people from Laval, Quebec
- List of Quebec regions
