= Laval-Ouest =

- Former city
- Ville de Laval
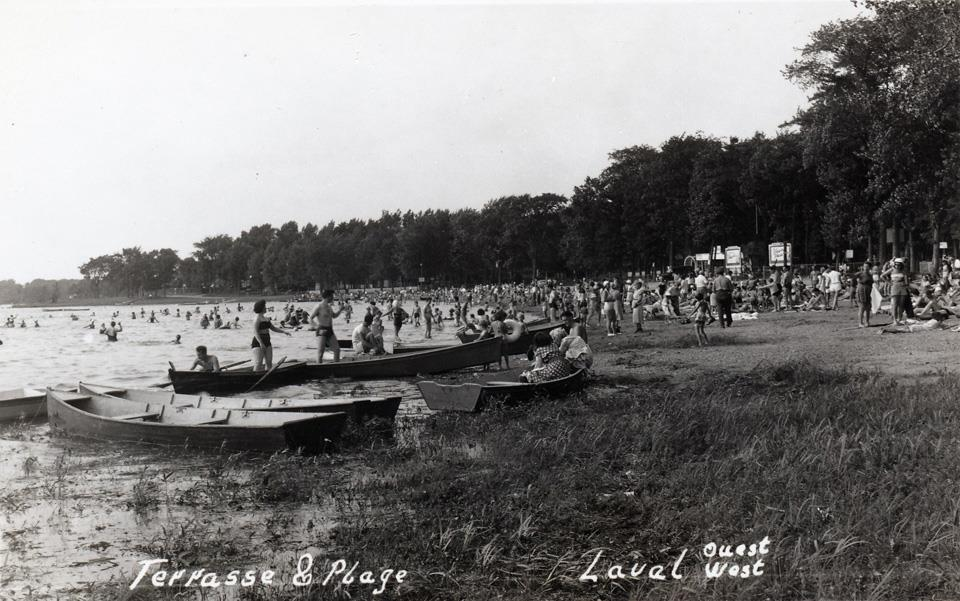
- Laval Ouest/West - Berge Aux Quatre Vents Summer 1940's

- Flag Coat of arms
- Motto(s): "Unité, progrès, grandeur" (French) "Unity, Progress, Greatness"
- Location in southern Quebec.
- Coordinates: 45°33′N 73°52′W
- Country: Canada
- Province: Quebec
- Region: Laval
- Municipality: Laval
- Postal Code: H7R
- Area codes: 450, 579

Laval-Ouest (French pronunciation: [laval wɛst]) is a district in Laval, Quebec. It was a separate city until the municipal mergers on August 6, 1965.

== Geography ==
Laval-Ouest is delimited north and north-west by the Rivière des Mille-Îles, south-west by Laval-sur-le-Lac, east by Fabreville and south by Sainte-Dorothée. Also known as Plage Laval.

== Demographics ==
As of 2011 the population of Laval-Ouest was 11369 residents. Of which at least 5875 residents reported being bilingual in both French and English. 4896 residents were unilingual Francophones, and 386 unilingual Anglophones.

== History ==
The municipality of "village de Plage Laval" became the village de Laval-Ouest in 1950. In 1962 it was annexed as part of Sainte-Dorothée, in 1964 it reverted to the City of Laval-Ouest, and in the following year was amalgamated into the ville de Laval.

On April 23, 1926, Warren & Arthur Smadbeck Ltd. acquired land that had previously been used as farmland. The latter were located on the territory of the municipality of the western part of the parish of Sainte-Rose, now called Fabreville.

Warren & Arthur Smadbeck Ltd., based in New York, USA, was involved in the development of several summer resorts along the coasts of Long Island, New York, including Mastic Beach and Amityville. The acquisitions on Île Jésus was to carry out a similar project along the Rivière des Mille Îles, with Montreal residents as their main clients.

A summer village, consisting mainly of chalets built near a beach, was set up by the company, and named of Plage-Laval, borrowing the name of the county of Laval, in which the sector is located. On February 19, 1932, Plage-Laval changed its status to become a city under the Act to incorporate the town of Plage Laval. It created a Bilingual Council, and elected Mr. Taillon as Mayor. The permanent population of the town was 281 residents, with an influx of over 5000 summer vacationers.

In 1950, Plage-Laval enlarged its territory by annexing, on both sides of present-day Boulevard Arthur-Sauvé, part of the territory of the municipality of the parish of Sainte-Rose, situated to the south of boulevard Sainte-Rose.

On 1 January 1951, the municipality changed its name to that of the city of Laval-Ouest. The 1952 census placed the population of the city with 731 French families, 494 English families, 236 Jewish families, and 66 other. In 1960, responding to the citizens' request, the town of Laval-Ouest annexed part of the territory of the municipality of the parish of Sainte-Dorothée, in particular between Boulevard Dagenais and chemin Saint-Antoine, and another Small part of the territory of the city of Fabreville.

On June 18, 1964, the municipality changed its status and became the city of Laval-Ouest

== Recreation ==
=== Parks ===
The "Berge aux Quatre-Vents" is a large public park and beach located in Laval-Ouest along the shores of the Milles-Illes river. It has sandy beaches and plenty of recreational green space and is open year-round. It is home to a variety of wild life including Canada Geese, Ducks, and Grand herons. During the summer the park is home to many concerts and musical spectacles. In the winter the area is a magnet for ice fishing.

Parc Laval Ouest is located both along Ch. Sainte-Antoine and 21E Avenue and contains both a football and soccer field, and small skateboard park, as well as a baseball diamond, and a contained dog walk park.

Berge de L'Anse located at the junction of 7E and 3E Avenues has a boat launch with parking adequate for vehicles with trailers as well as a small green space with benches.

Parc Nordier located at the corner of 33E Avenue and 24E Rue, just beside the fire station, is a smaller park with a sandbox and jungle gym.

Parc Ringuet with entrances both on Arthur-Sauve (behind the Library) and 49E Avenue contains a variety of child activities, as well as several multi use courts.

=== Skating / Hockey Arena ===
Aréna Hartland-Monahan Located on Arthur-Sauve is full sized indoor skating rink, with WIFI access on site.

=== Maison des Jeunes ===
La Masion des Jeunes de Laval Ouest Located at 3850 boulevard Ste-Rose is a community non-profit youth organization that has existed in the neighborhood since January 1992. The center has many different activities, such as a basketball team, as well as a Role Playing Game club.

=== Zones musicales ===
During the summer season the "Berge aux Quatre-Vents" is home to one of Laval's outdoor concert venues located at 925 Rue Riviera

== Education ==
Commission scolaire de Laval operates Francophone public schools.

- École primaire Fleur-de-Vie
- École primaire Raymond

Sir Wilfrid Laurier School Board operates Anglophone public schools.

- Our Lady of Peace Elementary School
- All portions of Laval are zoned to Laval Junior Academy and Laval Senior Academy.

== Historical Sites ==
Laval Ouest is the home to the oldest synagogue in the city of laval. The "Beth Abraham" located in a bungalow that seats about 100, was opened around 1940 in what was then known as "Laval West". In the 1930s, the then rural area with its beaches was a popular summer getaway for many Jewish families who rented summer homes there. The synagogue served summer residents till the mid-1970s and continues to be maintained, although it is only used now on the High Holy Days.
