= Chomedey, Quebec =

Chomedey
- Former city
- Ville de Laval
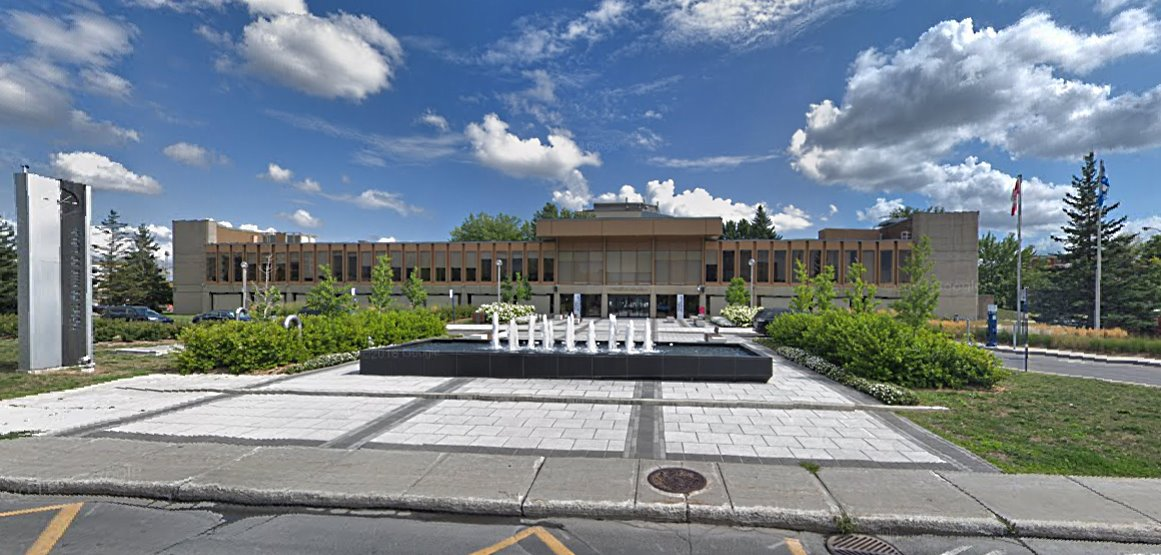
- Chomedey - Laval City Hall

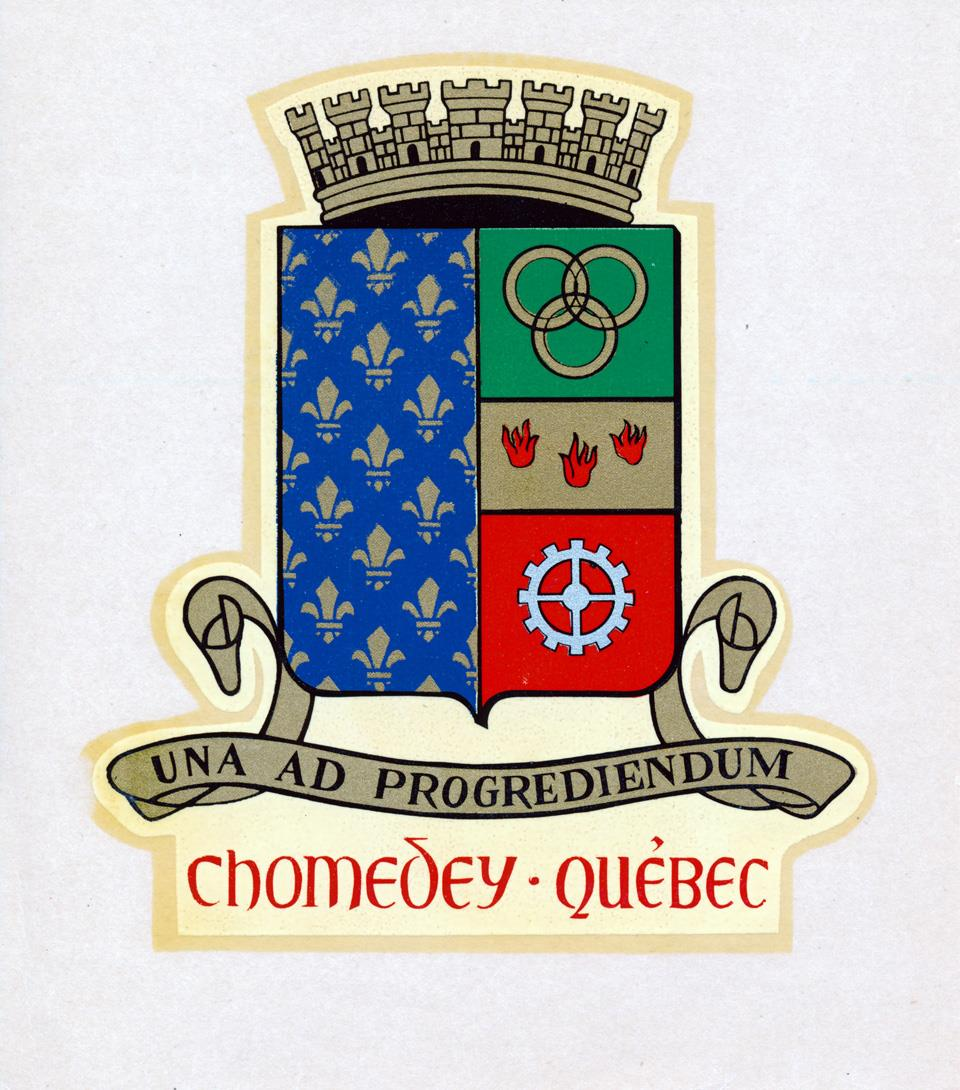
- Flag Coat of arms
- Motto: "Unité, progrès, grandeur" (French) "Unity, Progress, Greatness"
- Location in southern Quebec.
- Coordinates: 45°33′N 73°44′W
- Country: Canada
- Province: Quebec
- Region: Laval
- Municipality: Laval
- Postal Code: H7S, H7T, H7V, H7W
- Area codes: 450, 579

Chomedey (French pronunciation: [ʃɔmede]) is a district in the southwest of the city of Laval and was a separate municipality until the municipal mergers in 1965.

== History ==
On April 1, 1961, the towns of Renaud, Quebec and L'Abord-à-Plouffe and the city of Saint-Martin were merged, giving birth to the city of Chomedey. The city was named Chomedey in honor of Paul Chomedey de Maisonneuve, founder of Montreal. Chomedey's city hall became the city hall for all of Laval. The merger project was first launched by the administration of the city of L'Abord à Plouffe. On August 10, 1960, it passed a resolution expressing its desire to merge the three municipalities and the city of Laval-des-Rapides, under the name "Cité de Laval". Renaud (Laval)

Eight days later, Laval-des-Rapides withdrew from the merger project. Hesitation was also felt the city of Renaud, where a referendum was held on the issue. On January 16, 1961 The referendum was won by the "fusionists", and the birth of the new city was celebrated by civic festivities, held from October 8 to 15, 1961.

From then and onward, Chomedey stood out as a modern city, whose residential and industrial development excelled. The growth of Chomedey on the industrial front was rapid: the city had welcomed 1 new industry per month for 2 consecutive years, between 1962 and 1964.

In short, Chomedey quickly became a city in its own right. This amalgamated municipality was already expanding, shortly after its creation. In 1963, the new city studied the possibility of annexing her two neighbours, the towns of Sainte-Dorothée and Fabreville.

In 1964, the city inaugurated the new city hall. The building, designed according to the plans of the architects Affleck, Desbarats, Dimakopoulos, Lebensold and Sise, was to be part of an architectural ensemble that would constitute the Civic Center of Chomedey to house various services, including a library, a theater and an art center. The planned complex was not realized until the creation of the City of Laval.

== Geography ==
Chomedey is bordered on the south by the Rivière des Prairies, on the east by Laval-des-Rapides, Duvernay and Vimont, on the north by Sainte-Rose, on the north-west by Fabreville and on the west by Sainte-Dorothée.

Chomedey is bordered by the Prairies River to the South, approximately by Autoroute 13 to the West, Autoroute 440 to the North, Des Laurentides Boulevard and Autoroute 15 to the East.

== Demographics ==
Since the 1960s, Chomedey is the most multicultural neighbourhood of Laval. It has the largest Greek community of Quebec. Mirroring the geographic linguistic divisions in Montreal, there are more English-speakers in the west of Ile Jesus than in the east, and Chomedey has been home to the city's Anglophone and allophone minorities, notably a large community of Greeks.

Home Language (2006)
Language	Population	Pct (%)
French	45,085	50.04%
English	17,510	19.43%
Both English and French	840	0.93%
English and a non-Official language	1,460	1.62%
French and a non-Official language	2,070	2.29%
English, French and a non-Official language	615	0.68%
Other languages	22,500	24.97%

== Roads ==
The main thoroughfares are Curé-Labelle Blvd, Chomedey Blvd, Saint-Martin Blvd, Souvenir Rd, Notre-Dame Blvd, Samson Blvd, 100th Ave, Daniel-Johnson Blvd, Le Carrefour Blvd, Le Corbusier Blvd, Armand-Frappier Blvd, Cartier Blvd, Lévesque Blvd, Promenade Des Îles, Cléroux Blvd, Jean-Béraud Ave, Pierre-Péladeau Ave, Bois-de-Boulogne Ave, Avenir Blvd, Industriel Blvd, McNamara St, Terry-Fox Ave, Louis-Payette Ave and Perron Blvd.

Because of the rapid densification of this neighborhood and the development of the last fields and forested areas, there are more and more cars on the road. Since 2000, it is not uncommon to be in a traffic jam on many of main thoroughfares. Curé-Labelle Blvd, Chomedey Blvd, Saint-Martin Blvd, Notre-Dame Blvd and Le Corbusier Blvd are often subject to traffic jams, but the creation of reserved bus lanes, an expanded bike path network as well as the extension of the Metro into Laval are all helping Chomedians to favor more sustainable transit alternatives.

Traffic is a common problem, with many residents travelling to Montreal combined with Laurentians-Montreal commuter and cottage traffic.

== Education ==
Commission scolaire de Laval operates French-language public schools.

Secondary schools:

- École secondaire Alphonse-Desjardins
- École secondaire Saint-Martin
- École secondaire Saint-Maxime
- École d'éducation internationale de Laval

Primary schools:

- École primaire Coursol
- École primaire L'Harmonie
- École primaire Le Tandem
- École primaire Les Quatre-Vents
- École primaire Saint-Norbert
- École primaire Saint-Paul
- École primaire Simon-Vanier

Sir Wilfrid Laurier School Board operates English-language public schools. Elementary schools serving sections of Chomedey include:

- Crestview Elementary School
- Hillcrest Academy
- John F. Kennedy Elementary School
- Souvenir Elementary School - It was established as a high school in 1963 but became an elementary school in 1965.

All sections of Laval are zoned to Laval Junior Academy and Laval Senior Academy

In previous eras the St-Martin School Board served the community.

== Other Facts ==
According to the 2001 Census 28% spoke only French, 10% English, 58% were bilingual in both French and English and 3% spoke other languages than French and English.

The postal codes for this area begin with H7S, H7T, H7V, H7N and H7W. Land-based telephone numbers are assigned the 450 area code.

== Historical & Sites of Interest ==
The Cosmodome located on Autoroute 15 is the only museum in Canada dedicated solely to the space sciences and houses one of two lunar rocks on display in Canada.

The Armand Frappier Museum located on Blvd. des Prairies is a biotechnology museum named after Dr.Armand Frappier who was instrumental in the fight against tuberculosis in Canada

Église and Park Saint-Maxime, between 77e and 80e Avenue. Saint-Maxime parish, formed from Saint-Martin parish, was established in 1928. Prior to the church's construction in 1958, religious services were celebrated in the first École Saint-Maxime, located at 3781, boulevard Lévesque.

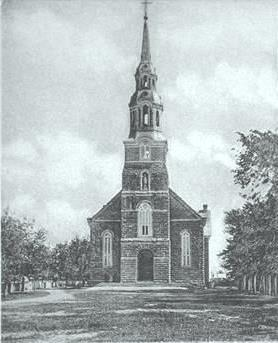
Église Saint-Martin

The Lachapelle Bridge, located on Blvd. Labelle connecting Montreal and Laval. The present-day metal bridge dates from 1890 and was doubled in size in 1977 after undergoing extensive modifications in 1940. The first bridge that linked the banks of Montréal and île Jésus was built of wood around 1848 and replaced the ferry that brought travellers from Cartierville to L'Abord-à-Plouffe. It was called the Cartierville bridge for a long time.

The Centre du Sablon located on Ch. du Sablon is run by the Corporation du centre du Sablon, a non-profit organization. The City of Laval purchased the building from the Jewish community in 1992, where it was formerly a YMHA. The Centre seeks to satisfy residents' social, recreational and cultural needs by offering a wide range of activities aimed at different age groups.

The Saint-Martin parish church Église Saint-Martin located on St. Martin, near Blvd. Labelle, was built in 1782, and was the first church on île Jésus located at a crossroads inland. The second church, erected in 1874, just southeast of the first one, designed by the architects Bourgeau and Leprohon, was destroyed in 1942 by lightning. It was replaced in 1949 by the existing church, built facing boulevard Saint-Martin, over 120 m away.
