= Laval Senior Academy =

Coordinates: 45.5525°N 73.7422°W

Location
- 3200 Boulevard du Souvenir Ouest; Laval, Québec, H7V 1W9; Canada

Information
- Former names: Laurier Senior High School, Laval Senior High School
- School type: Public institution
- Motto: Perseverance, Integrity, Citizenship, Achievement
- Established: 2015
- Sister school: Laval Junior Academy
- School board: Sir Wilfrid Laurier School Board
- Principal: Serge-Édouard Jeanniton
- Secondary years taught: Secondary 3 through 5
- Sports: Football, soccer, hockey (Sports-Études)
- Website: https://lsa.swlauriersb.qc.ca/

Laval Senior Academy (LSA) is an English-language public senior high school in Laval, Quebec, in Canada. It is operated by the Sir Wilfrid Laurier School Board (SWLSB).

== History ==
Laval Senior Academy was established on July 1, 2015, following the merger of Laval Liberty High School and Laurier Senior High School.

The merger formed part of a reorganization plan by the SWLSB to balance student enrolment across four English-language secondary schools in Laval: Laval Liberty High School, Laurier Senior High School, Laval Junior High School, and Mother Teresa Junior High School.

Former SWLSB Chairman Nick Milas explained that consolidating the schools was intended to offer a wider range of academic and extracurricular options while addressing uneven registrations. The plan initially faced opposition from students and parents concerned about school identity and continuity of activities.

== Community Learning Centre ==
Laval Senior Academy functions as a Community Learning Centre (CLC), an approach that integrates school and community development through collaborative partnerships. CLC schools focus on:

- Promoting student success and well-being
- Responding to local cultural and social needs
- Offering services beyond school hours
- Supporting community engagement and long-term partnerships

== Academic and extracurricular programs ==
=== Sport-Études ===
LSA offers several programs that enable student-athletes recognized by their provincial sport federations to combine academic learning with athletic training.

These programs are offered in collaboration with Sports Québec federations and local organizations.

Disciplines include: Baseball, Basketball, Dance, Diving, Figure Skating, Gymnastics, Hockey, Horseback Riding, Ringuette, Rock Climbing, Soccer, Swimming, Taekwondo, Tennis, Track and Field, and Volleyball.

Student-athletes follow condensed academic schedules to allow time for daily training and competitions.

== Athletics and student life ==
=== Panthers Football ===
The LSA Panthers Football Team is composed of students enrolled in the school’s Football Concentration program.

The program teaches the fundamental skills and techniques of football, emphasizing teamwork, sportsmanship, and overall athletic development. Students also engage in other sports to build versatility and physical conditioning.

=== Hockey ===
The LSA Panthers Hockey Program includes several teams that compete within the RSEQ (Réseau du sport étudiant du Québec).

The program features a Cadet team (Secondary 3) focused on skill development and two or more Juvenile teams (Secondary 4 and 5) designed for higher competition. Players are evaluated on performance, leadership, and academic standing.

=== Track and field ===
Laval Senior Academy’s Track and Field program includes girls’ and boys’ teams that participate in running, jumping, and throwing events. The girls’ team competes regularly at provincial meets, while the boys’ program operates based on student interest.

=== Fillactive ===
The school participates in a Québec-based charitable initiative that encourages girls aged 12–17 to stay active through school-organized fitness activities and events.

=== Weight room and fitness ===
Laval Senior Academy provides a supervised weight room open to all students during designated lunch periods. The facility is managed by staff and supports student wellness through guided workouts and personalized fitness advice.

== Notable events ==
=== COVID-19 protest (2022) ===
In 2021, approximately 50–200 students participated in a protest at LSA regarding COVID-19 mask mandates and cafeteria restrictions. The protest was largely peaceful, though minor disciplinary actions were reported.

=== Lockdown incident (2023) ===
The school was briefly placed under lockdown following reports of an armed individual near campus. Police later determined that the item involved was a water gun, and no injuries occurred. A 16-year-old student was detained and later released without charges.

=== End-of-year prank controversy (2023) ===
In June 2023, end-of-year student pranks escalated when smoke bombs were set off on school grounds. The Laval Police were called to the scene, and the school administration subsequently barred approximately 75 students from attending the prom. The incident received coverage from local media and raised discussions about discipline and school culture.

== Fundraisers and community involvement ==
Laval Senior Academy organizes several annual fundraising and community events that engage students, staff, and local residents.

=== Pasta Night ===
Pasta Night is LSA's annual fundraising event supporting both student initiatives and the Centre Bénévolat et Moisson de Laval (CBML), a local food security organization.

The family-friendly event features food, games, face painting, balloon art, and raffles. Past raffle prizes have included Montreal Canadiens tickets, televisions, restaurant gift cards, and AirPods.

=== Terry Fox campaigns ===
LSA regularly participates in the Terry Fox Foundation fundraising campaign.

In 2022–2023, the school raised $12,749.65 and hosted Fred Fox, Terry Fox’s brother, who spoke about the foundation’s cancer research efforts.

The campaign also featured the “LSA Rocks for Terry Fox” benefit concert, with performances by Chair Warriors and The Damn Truth, which raised nearly $9,000.

The annual Terry Fox Run marks the culmination of each year’s campaign.

=== Pink in the City Raise Craze ===
Laval Senior Academy participates annually in the Pink in the City Raise Craze, a Montreal-based charitable initiative that raises funds and awareness for breast cancer research and support programs, in collaboration with the McGill University Health Centre (MUHC) Foundation.

Students engage in “acts of kindness” to earn donations, fostering empathy, volunteerism, and social responsibility. The initiative aligns with LSA’s emphasis on community involvement and service learning.

=== Other fundraising events ===
The school hosts a range of light-hearted and community-building fundraisers, including:

- Hot Ones Comes to LSA: a staff chicken-wing eating challenge featuring progressively spicy sauces.
- Costumed Soccer Game: a comedic match between staff and students dressed in inflatable costumes.
- Coin Wars: a grade-level competition involving coins and paper money to earn or deduct points; Grade 11 won in 2023.
- Hockey Night at LSA: an annual social event where students and staff watch Montreal Canadiens games together in the school’s Bistro.

== Administration ==
As of 2023, the Principal of Laval Senior Academy is Serge-Édouard Jeanniton.

The school continues to operate under the jurisdiction of the Sir Wilfrid Laurier School Board.
