= Centre de services scolaire de Laval =

The Centre de services scolaire de Laval (French pronunciation: [sɑ̃tʁ də sɛʁvis skɔlɛʁ də laval], CSSDL) is a French-language school service centre in the Canadian province of Quebec. It is headquartered in Laval. As of 2011, the board of the predecessor, Commission scolaire de Laval, managed fifty-two primary schools, fourteen secondary schools, eight professional development centres, and three adult education centres in Laval.

Like all French-language school boards in Quebec, the commission is overseen by a board of directors rather than elected commissioners.

== Schools ==
=== Secondary schools ===
- École secondaire Alphonse-Desjardins
- École secondaire Curé-Antoine-Labelle
- École secondaire De la Croisée
- École secondaire De la Mosaïque
- École secondaire Georges-Vanier
- École secondaire Horizon Jeunesse
- École secondaire Jean-Piaget
- École secondaire L'Odyssée-des-Jeunes
- École secondaire Leblanc
- École secondaire Mont-de-La Salle
- École secondaire Poly-Jeunesse
- École secondaire Saint-Martin
- École secondaire Saint-Maxime
- École d'éducation internationale de Laval (ÉÉIL)

=== Specialized schools ===
- Centre de qualification professionnelle et d'entrepreneuriat de Laval
- École Alphonse-Desjardins
- École de la Mosaïque
- École Jean-Piaget

=== Primary schools ===
- Alfred-Pellan
- Charles-Bruneau
- Coeur-Soleil
- Coursol
- Demers
- De la Cime
- De l'Arc-en-ciel
- Des Cardinaux
- Des Cèdres
- Des Ormeaux
- Du Bois-Joli
- Du Parc
- De l'Avenir
- De l'Équinoxe
- Fleur-de-Vie
- Fleur-Soleil
- Hébert
- J.-Jean-Joubert
- Jean-Lemonde
- Jean-XXIII
- L'Aquarelle
- L'Envolée
- L'Escale
- L'Harmonie
- L'Orée-des-Bois
- La Source
- Le Baluchon
- Le Petit-Prince
- Le Sentier
- Le Tandem
- Léon-Guilbault
- Les Explorateurs
- Les Quatre-Vents / Monseigneur-Laval
- Les Trois-Soleils
- Marc-Aurèle-Fortin
- Marcel-Vaillancourt
- Notre-Dame-du-Sourire
- Paul-Comtois
- Paul-VI
- Pépin
- Père-Vimont
- Pierre-Laporte
- Raymond
- Saint-François
- Saint-Gilles
- Saint-Julien
- Saint-Norbert
- Saint-Paul
- Sainte-Béatrice
- Sainte-Dorothée
- Sainte-Marguerite
- Simon-Vanier
- Val-des-Arbres
- Villemaire

=== Alternative primary schools ===
- École l'Envol
- École le Baluchon

== Related pages ==
- Sir Wilfrid Laurier School Board (area Anglophone school board)
