= 2021 Quebec municipal elections =

Canadian local elections

- November 7, 2021

The Canadian province of Quebec held municipal elections in its municipalities on November 7, 2021.

Results by region:

Note: (X) refers to being an incumbent

== Bas-Saint-Laurent ==
=== Amqui ===
Mayoral candidate	Vote	%
Sylvie Blanchette	1,211	59.28
Normand Boulianne	705	34.51
Jean-Yves Fournier	127	6.22

=== Matane ===
Mayoral candidate	Vote	%
Eddy Métivier	2,962	66.31
Annie Veillette	832	18.63
Steven Grant	673	15.07

=== Mont-Joli ===
Mayoral candidate	Vote	%
Martin Soucy (X)	Acclaimed	

=== Rimouski ===
==== Mayor ====
Mayoral candidate	Vote	%
Guy Caron	13,976	80.71
Virginie Proulx	3,340	19.29
Pierre Lapointe	Withdrew	

==== Rimouski City Council ====
Candidate	Vote	%
Sacré-Coeur District (1)
Sébastien Bolduc (X)	1,286	65.48
Eric Morneau	489	24.90
Louis Deschênes	189	9.62
Nazareth District (2)
Rodrigue Joncas (X)	922	63.15
Nelly Marmen	538	36.85
Saint-Germain District (3)
Philippe Cousineau Morin	709	52.95
Colette Schoonbroodt	328	24.50
Raynald Caissy	214	15.98
Roselle Saint-Laurent	88	6.57
Rimouski-Est District (4)
Cécilia Michaud (X)	686	44.46
Rachel Germain-Paquette	525	34.02
Andy Guay	243	15.75
Hugues Langlois	89	5.77
Pointe-au-Père District (5)
Julie Carré	598	38.41
Sylvie Brisson	512	32.88
Jacques Lévesque (X)	447	28.71
Sainte-Odile District (6)
Grégory Thorez (X)	879	50.60
Guillaume Cavanagh	858	49.40
Saint-Robert District (7)
Jocelyn Pelletier (X)	787	53.14
Raphaël Arsenault	482	32.55
Chantale Marin	212	14.31
Terrasse Arthur-Buies District (8)
Réjean Savard	Acclaimed	
Saint-Pie-X District (9)
Mélanie Bernier	1,033	52.45
Simon St-Pierre (X)	933	47.46
Sainte-Blandine et Mont-Lebel District (10)
Dave Dumas (X)	Acclaimed	
Le Bic District (11)
Mélanie Beaulieu	778	59.48
Julie Gauthier	530	40.52

=== Rivière-du-Loup ===
Mayoral candidate	Vote	%
Mario Bastille	Acclaimed	

=== Trois-Pistoles ===
Party	Mayoral candidate	Vote	%
Action Trois-Pistoles	Jean Pierre Rioux (X)	1,072	95.80
Independent	Pierre-André Michaud	24	2.14
Independent	Armand Malenfant	23	2.06
Total valid votes		1,119	42.2

== Saguenay–Lac-Saint-Jean ==
=== Alma ===
Mayoral candidate	Vote	%
Sylvie Beaumont	4,834	44.34
Jocelyn Fradette	4,248	38.97
Manon Girard	1,420	13.03
Lucille Gagnon	399	3.66

=== Dolbeau-Mistassini ===
Mayoral candidate	Vote	%
André Guy	Acclaimed	

=== Roberval ===
Mayoral candidate	Vote	%
Serge Bergeron	3,015	77.15
Guy Larouche	893	22.85

=== Saguenay ===
==== Mayor ====
Party	Mayoral candidate	Vote	%
Independent	Julie Dufour	25,350	47.52
Équipe du renouveau démocratique	Josée Néron (X)	16,341	30.63
Independent	Serge Simard	5,662	10.61
Independent	Catherine Morissette	2,608	4.89
Unissons Saguenay	Claude Côté	2,109	3.95
Independent	Jacinthe Vaillancourt	1,276	2.39
Independent	Dominic Gagnon	Withdrew	

==== Saguenay City Council ====
District 1
Party	Council candidate	Vote	%
Independent	Jimmy Bouchard (X)		Acclaimed
District 2
Party	Council candidate	Vote	%
Independent	Claude Bouchard	2,050	49.91
Independent	Daniel Tremblay-Larouche	1,187	28.90
Independent	Stéphanie Hovington	738	17.97
Unissons Saguenay	Marieve Ruel	132	3.21
District 3
Party	Council candidate	Vote	%
Independent	Michel Thiffault (X)	2,149	76.40
Unissons Saguenay	Laurence Berger	664	23.60
District 4
Party	Council candidate	Vote	%
Independent	Kevin Armstrong (X)	1,928	55.26
Independent	Stéphanie Fortin	834	23.90
Independent	Réjean Hudon	562	16.11
Independent	Pierre Bouchard	165	4.73
District 5
Party	Council candidate	Vote	%
Independent	Carl Dufour (X)	Acclaimed	
District 6
Party	Council candidate	Vote	%
Independent	Jean-Marc Crevier (X)	2,452	64.21
Équipe du renouveau démocratique	Benoit Tremblay	920	24.09
Unissons Saguenay	Emmanuelle Côté-Gingras	447	11.70
District 7
Party	Council candidate	Vote	%
Independent	Serge Gaudreault	2,474	57.36
Independent	Marc Pettersen (X)	1,839	42.64
District 8
Party	Council candidate	Vote	%
Independent	Mireille Jean	1,624	45.50
Independent	Joan Simard	929	26.03
Équipe du renouveau démocratique	Julie Morin	623	17.46
Independent	France Tremblay	240	6.72
Unissons Saguenay	Éliane Carrier	153	4.29
District 9
Party	Council candidate	Vote	%
Independent	Michel Tremblay (X)	2,480	70.94
Independent	Mario Gagnon	832	23.80
Unissons Saguenay	Jean-Benoit Roussel	184	5.26
District 10
Party	Council candidate	Vote	%
Independent	Jacques Cleary	1,830	42.81
Équipe du renouveau démocratique	Caroline Thériault	1,015	23.74
Independent	Jocelyn Robert	769	17.99
Independent	Jacques Pelletier	661	15.46
District 11
Party	Council candidate	Vote	%
Équipe du renouveau démocratique	Marc Bouchard (X)	1,654	42.63
Independent	Louise Blanchette	1,092	28.14
Independent	Marie Brunelle	843	21.73
Unissons Saguenay	Philippe Robert	291	7.50
District 12
Party	Council candidate	Vote	%
Independent	Michel Potvin (X)	2,514	54.29
Unissons Saguenay	Andrée-Anne Brillant	2,117	45.71
District 13
Party	Council candidate	Vote	%
Independent	Raynald Simard (X)	Acclaimed	
District 14
Party	Council candidate	Vote	%
Independent	Éric Simard (X)	1,491	61.64
Unissons Saguenay	Josépier Guillot	481	19.88
Independent	Réjean Boulianne	447	18.48
District 15
Party	Council candidate	Vote	%
Independent	Martin Harvey (X)	1,592	73.16
Independent	Martial Laberge	584	26.84

==== By-election ====
A by-election was held in District #14 on May 8, 2022. The results were as follows:

Party	Candidate	Vote	%
Independent	Jean Tremblay	690	38.38
Independent	Francyne T. Gobeil	461	25.64
Independent	Ghislain Harvey	352	19.58
Independent	Christian Joncas	143	7.95
Unissons Saguenay	Éden Tremblay	139	7.73

=== Saint-Félicien ===
Mayoral candidate	Vote	%
Luc Gibbons (X)	1,494	40.03
Gervais Laprise	1,285	34.43
Michel Simard	953	25.54

=== Saint-Honoré ===
Mayoral candidate	Vote	%
Bruno Tremblay (X)	Acclaimed	

== Capitale-Nationale ==
=== Baie-Saint-Paul ===
Mayoral candidate	Vote	%
Michaël Pilote	3,254	86.54
Luc A. Goudreau	506	13.46

=== Boischatel ===
Party	Mayoral candidate	Vote	%
Option Boischatel	Benoit Bouchard (X)	Acclaimed	

=== Donnacona ===
Mayoral candidate	Vote	%
Jean-Claude Léveillée (X)	Acclaimed	

=== La Malbaie ===
Mayoral candidate	Vote	%
Michel Couturier (X)	Acclaimed	

=== L'Ancienne-Lorette ===
Party	Mayoral candidate	Vote	%
Fierté lorettaine - Gaétan Pageau	Gaétan Pageau (X)	5,533	92.16
Independent	Claude-Etienne Valois	471	7.84

=== Lac-Beauport ===
Party	Mayoral candidate	Vote	%
Option citoyenne Lac-Beauport	Charles Brochu	1,970	63.41
Independent	Guy Gilbert	675	21.73
Independent	Hélène Bergeron	334	10.75
Independent	Bernard La Roche	128	4.12

=== Pont-Rouge ===
Mayoral candidate	Vote	%
Mario Dupont	Acclaimed	

=== Quebec City ===
==== Mayor ====
2021 Quebec City municipal election
Party	Candidate	Votes	%
Québec forte et fière	Bruno Marchand	59,580	32.32
Équipe Marie-Josée Savard	Marie-Josée Savard	58,746	31.86
Québec 21	Jean-François Gosselin	45,477	24.67
Transition Québec	Jackie Smith	12,306	6.67
Démocratie Québec	Jean Rousseau	7,204	3.91
Alliance citoyenne	Alain Giasson	398	0.22
Independent	Lucie Perreault	374	0.20
Independent	Patrice Fortin	277	0.15

=== Saint-Augustin-de-Desmaures ===
Party	Mayoral candidate	Vote	%
Independent	Sylvain Juneau (X)	5,237	62.01
Renouveau Saint-Augustin - Équipe Annie Godbout	Annie Godbout	3,208	37.99

=== Sainte-Brigitte-de-Laval ===
Mayoral candidate	Vote	%
Alain Dufresne	1,306	51.99
Carl Thomassin (X)	1,077	42.87
Didier Bonaventure	129	5.14

==== By-election ====
A mayoral by-election was intended to be held on April 10, 2022. Only one candidate ran, and thus was elected by acclamation.

Candidate	Vote	%
France Fortier	Acclaimed	

=== Sainte-Catherine-de-la-Jacques-Cartier ===
Mayoral candidate	Vote	%
Pierre Dolbec (X)	1,062	67.77
Julie Guilbeault	505	32.33

=== Saint-Raymond ===
Mayoral candidate	Vote	%
Claude Duplain	2,227	82.67
Guy Beaumont	467	17.33

=== Shannon ===
Party	Mayoral candidate	Vote	%
Independent	Sarah Perreault	872	61.41
Démocratie Shannon	François-Michel Hardy	548	38.59

=== Stoneham-et-Tewkesbury ===
Party	Mayoral candidate	Vote	%
Équipe Sébastien Couture	Sébastien Couture	2,241	66.68
Parti uni des Cantons	Claude Lebel (X)	692	21.21
Independent	Robert Miller	330	10.11

== Mauricie ==
=== La Tuque ===
Mayoral candidate	Vote	%
Luc Martel	1940	37.03
Yves Tousignant	1715	32.74
Normand Beaudoin	1064	20.31
Caroline Bérubé	481	9.18
Jean-Paul Tremblay	39	0.74

=== Louiseville ===
Mayoral candidate	Vote	%
Yvon Deshaies (X)	Acclaimed	

=== Notre-Dame-du-Mont-Carmel ===
Mayoral candidate	Vote	%
Luc Dostaler (X)	Acclaimed	

=== Shawinigan ===
==== Mayor ====
Mayoral candidate	Vote	%
Michel Angers (X)	9,247	54.01
Luc Trudel	7,054	41.20
Claude Cournoyer	819	4.78

==== Shawinigan City Council ====
Candidate	Vote	%
de la Rivière District (1)
Nancy Déziel (X)	Acclaimed	
des Boisés District (2)
Louis-Jean Garceau	1,525	57.72
Nathalie Côté	1,117	42.28
Val-Maurice District (3)
Guy Arseneault (X)	1,041	43.52
Jean-Yves Laforest	794	33.19
Pierre Giguère	557	23.29
Almaville District (4)
Josette Allard-Gignac (X)	1,540	76.24
Louise Brodeur	480	23.76
de la Cité District (5)
Jacinthe Campagna (X)	1,177	76.38
Jocelyn Trudel	364	23.62
des Montagnes District (6)
Claude Grenier (X)	1,354	54.51
Marie-Claude Gaudet	1,130	45.49
du Rocher District (7)
Lucie De Bons (X)	1,004	50.73
Steeve Carrey	719	36.33
Mirella Marandola	256	12.94
des Hêtres District (8)
Jean-Yves Tremblay (X)	934	50.60
Eric Gilbert	485	26.27
Wellie Denoncourt	256	13.87
Denis H. Tremblay	171	9.26

==== By-election ====
A by-election was held in des Montagnes District on June 5, 2022. The results were as follows:

Candidate	Vote	%
Christian Hould	451	33.73
Serge Aubry	400	29.92
Caroline Lamarre	200	14.96
Marie-Claude Gaudet	199	14.88
Sylvain Giguère	80	5.98

=== Trois-Rivières ===
==== Mayor ====
Mayoral candidate	Vote	%
Jean Lamarche (X)	24,065	61.49
Valérie Renaud-Martin	14,480	37.00
Gilles Brodeur	593	1.52

==== Trois-Rivières City Council ====
Carmel District (1)
Party	Council candidate	Vote	%
Independent	Pierre Montreuil (X)	1,387	57.94
Action civique de Trois-Rivières	Léonie Gentès-Allard	1,007	42.06
Carrefours District (2)
Party	Council candidate	Vote	%
Independent	René Martin	1,875	59.47
Independent	Guy Côté	741	23.50
Action civique de Trois-Rivières	Jean-Claude Ayotte	537	17.03
Châteaudun District (3)
Party	Council candidate	Vote	%
Independent	Luc Tremblay (X)	1,493	47.05
Independent	Gaétan Leclerc	988	31.14
Action civique de Trois-Rivières	Jean Blanchette	692	21.81
Chavigny District (4)
Party	Council candidate	Vote	%
Independent	Maryse Bellemare (X)	1,693	63.72
Independent	Marie-Claude Camirand	848	31.92
Action civique de Trois-Rivières	Martin Poisson	116	4/37
Estacades District (5)
Party	Council candidate	Vote	%
Independent	Pierre-Luc Fortin (X)	Acclaimed	
Action civique de Trois-Rivières	Craig Cahill	Withdrew	
Forges District (6)
Party	Council candidate	Vote	%
Independent	Alain Lafontaine	1,085	35.28
Independent	Pierre Piché	1,058	34.41
Independent	André Dutremble	527	17.14
Action civique de Trois-Rivières	Daniel Ringuette	405	13.17
La-Vérendrye District (7)
Party	Council candidate	Vote	%
Independent	Dany Carpentier (X)	1,328	68.38
Independent	Hélène Proulx	614	31.62
Madeleine District (8)
Party	Council candidate	Vote	%
Independent	Sabrina Roy (X)	1,781	80.70
Action civique de Trois-Rivières	Alain St-Onge	426	19.30
Marie-de-l'Incarnation District (9)
Party	Council candidate	Vote	%
Independent	Richard W. Dober	1,164	51.60
Independent	Robert Martin	659	29.21
Independent	Jean Beaulieu	433	19.19
Pointe-du-Lac (10)
Party	Council candidate	Vote	%
Independent	François Bélisle (X)	2,266	75.71
Independent	Nicole Morin	727	24.29
Richelieu (11)
Party	Council candidate	Vote	%
Independent	Jonathan Bradley	1,687	48.93
Independent	Nicolas Mêlé	1,307	37.91
Independent	Marc-Antoine Berthiaume	454	13.17
Rivières (12)
Party	Council candidate	Vote	%
Independent	Pascale Albernhe-Lahaie	1,406	41.20
Independent	Joan Lefebvre	1,139	33.37
Independent	Claude Alarie	868	25.43
Sainte-Marthe (13)
Party	Council candidate	Vote	%
Independent	Daniel Cournoyer (X)	1,847	69.28
Independent	Pierre Samson	454	17.03
Independent	Dany Poulin	365	13.69
Saint-Louis-de-France (14)
Party	Council candidate	Vote	%
Independent	Geneviève Auclair	1,868	62.90
Independent	Michel Cormier (X)	1,102	37.10

== Estrie ==
=== Bromont ===
Mayoral candidate	Vote	%
Louis Villeneuve (X)	Acclaimed	

=== Coaticook ===
Mayoral candidate	Vote	%
Simon Madore (X)	Acclaimed	

=== Cookshire-Eaton ===
Mayoral candidate	Vote	%
Mario Gendron	885	65.80
Sylvie Lapointe (X)	464	34.40

=== Cowansville ===
Mayoral candidate	Vote	%
Sylvie Beauregard (X)	2,554	67.41
Jean-Yves Hinse	1,235	32.59

=== Farnham ===
Mayoral candidate	Vote	%
Patrick Melchior (X)	2,239	88.22
Christian Labrecque	299	11.78

=== Granby ===
==== Mayor ====
Mayoral candidate	Vote	%
Julie Bourdon	14,421	64.11
Michel Duchesneau	4,300	19.12
Jocelyn Dupuis	3,576	15.90
Jaouad El Kaabi	196	0.87

==== Granby City Council ====
Candidate	Vote	%
District 1
Stéphane Giard (X)	1,714	82.64
Salah Chraiet	360	17.36
District 2
Paul Goulet	1,950	63.48
Penny Lamarre	1,122	36.52
District 3
François Lemay	1,523	55.04
Liette Senay	1,244	44.96
District 4
Geneviève Rheault	1,587	62.33
Pierre Lavoie	959	37.67
District 5
Alain Lacasse (X)	932	43.19
Francis Komedza	920	42.63
Robert Régimbald	306	14.18
District 6
Denyse Tremblay (X)	684	34.67
Alysson Gince	553	28.03
Bruno Junior St-Amand	430	21.79
Guy Veilleux	306	15.51
District 7
Robert Riel (X)	1,019	63.53
Mario Brouillette	388	24.19
Mario Rochefort	197	12.28
District 8
Félix Dionne	729	42.56
Thérèse Desloges	359	20.96
Normand Robillard	341	19.91
Faustin Mugisha	104	6.07
Alain Turcotte	92	5.37
Edgar Villamarin	88	5.14
District 9
Robert Vincent (X)	976	49.02
Stéphane Pollender	628	31.54
Francis Couture	387	19.44
Pascal Lavigne	Withdrew	
District 10
Catherine Baudin (X)	Acclaimed	

=== Lac-Brome ===
Mayoral candidate	Vote	%
Richard Burcombe (X)	Acclaimed	

=== Lac-Mégantic ===
Mayoral candidate	Vote	%
Julie Morin (X)	Acclaimed	

=== Magog ===
Mayoral candidate	Vote	%
Nathalie Pelletier	5,675	62.99
Nathalie Bélanger	3,334	37.01

=== Shefford ===
Mayoral candidate	Vote	%
Éric Chagnon (X)	1,123	75.72
Brigitte Lepage	270	18.21
Sylvain Audet	90	6.07

=== Sherbrooke ===
==== Mayor ====
Party	Mayoral candidate	Vote	%
Sherbrooke citoyen	Évelyne Beaudin (X)	22,171	41.36
Independent	Luc Fortin	21,179	39.41
Independent	Steve Lussier	10,086	18.82
Independent	Patrick Tétreault	166	0.31

==== Sherbrooke City Council ====
Lac Magog District
Party	Council candidate	Vote	%
Independent	Nancy Robichaud	2,367	55.60
Sherbrooke citoyen	Sophie Payeur	1,890	44.40
Rock Forest District
Party	Council candidate	Vote	%
Independent	Annie Godbout (X)	2,737	57.62
Sherbrooke citoyen	François-Olivier Desmarais	2,013	42.38
Saint-Élie District
Party	Council candidate	Vote	%
Independent	Christelle Lefèvre	2,339	59.87
Sherbrooke citoyen	Jean Bossé	1,568	40.13
Brompton District
Party	Council candidate	Vote	%
Sherbrooke citoyen	Catherine Boileau	1,143	50.44
Independent	Sylvie Théberge	1,123	49.56
l'Hôtel-Dieu District
Party	Council candidate	Vote	%
Sherbrooke citoyen	Laure Letarte-Lavoie	1,832	53.93
Independent	Maxence Dauphinais-Pelletier	1,437	42.30
Independent	Hubert Richard	128	3.77
Desranleau District
Party	Council candidate	Vote	%
Independent	Danielle Berthold (X)	2,439	58.07
Sherbrooke citoyen	Vicky Langlois	1,761	41.93
des Quatre-Saisons District
Party	Council candidate	Vote	%
Sherbrooke citoyen	Joanie Bellerose	1,245	41.43
Independent	Jean Dugré	1,005	33.44
Independent	Marie-France Carrier	755	25.12
Pin-Solitaire District
Party	Council candidate	Vote	%
Independent	Hélène Dauphinais	1,427	47.79
Sherbrooke citoyen	Ludovick Nadeau	840	28.13
Independent	Pierre Avard (X)	719	24.08
Lennoxville Borough
Party	Council candidate	Vote	%
Independent	Claude Charron (X)	731	45.49
Sherbrooke citoyen	Catherine Duguay	474	29.50
Independent	Bertrand Collins	402	25.02
l'Université District
Party	Council candidate	Vote	%
Independent	Paul Gingues (X)	2,955	66.03
Sherbrooke citoyen	Éric Laverdure	1,520	33.97
Ascot District
Party	Council candidate	Vote	%
Sherbrooke citoyen	Geneviève La Roche	1,354	42.17
Independent	Karine Godbout (X)	1,193	37.15
Independent	Christian Bibeau	664	20.68
Lac-des-Nations District
Party	Council candidate	Vote	%
Sherbrooke citoyen	Raïs Kibonge	2,025	51.45
Independent	Pierre Morency	1,160	29.47
Independent	Éric DesLauriers	751	19.08
Golf District
Party	Council candidate	Vote	%
Independent	Marc Denault (X)	3,845	63.92
Sherbrooke citoyen	Julien Fontaine-Binette	2,170	36.08
Carrefour District
Party	Council candidate	Vote	%
Sherbrooke citoyen	Fernanda Luz	2,057	42.13
Independent	Marc-Alexandre Bourget	1,484	30.40
Independent	Mario Deslongchamps	1,341	27.47

=== Val-des-Sources ===
Mayoral candidate	Vote	%
Hugues Grimard (X)	Acclaimed	

=== Windsor ===
Mayoral candidate	Vote	%
Sylvie Bureau (X)	Acclaimed	

== Montreal ==
=== Beaconsfield ===
Mayoral candidate	Vote	%
Georges Bourelle (X)	2,858	54.68
Johanne Hudon-Armstrong	2,369	45.32

=== Côte-Saint-Luc ===
Party	Mayoral candidate	Vote	%
Independent	Mitchell Brownstein (X)	5,524	62.22
Team Tordjman	David Tordjman	3,354	37.78

=== Dollard-des-Ormeaux ===
==== Mayor ====
Mayoral candidate	Vote	%
Alex Bottausci (X)	Acclaimed	

==== Dollard-des-Ormeaux City Council ====
Candidate	Vote	%
District 1
Laurence Parent (X)	Acclaimed	
District 2
Errol Johnson (X)	906	74.94
Isabel Maicas	225	18.61
Michael Stergiotis	78	6.45
District 3
Max Mickey Guttman (X)	727	77.84
Nabil Abu-Thuraia	207	22.16
District 4
Tanya Toledano	808	56.07
Herbert Brownstein (X)	528	36.64
Eddy Kara	105	7.29
District 5
Morris Vesely (X)	670	70.82
Richard Zilversmit	276	29.18
District 6
Valérie Assouline (X)	579	42.95
Dereik Gregory	543	40.28
Deepak Awasti	226	16.77
District 7
Ryan Brownstein	845	51.68
Pulkit Kantawala (X)	790	48.32
District 8
Anastasia Assimakopoulos	648	42.74
Marie Tsagaropoulos	494	32.59
Malik Shaheed	200	13.19
Ahmed Elpannann	127	8.38
Duwanne Nelson	47	3.10

=== Dorval ===
Party	Mayoral candidate	Vote	%
Dorval Action Team	Marc Doret	2,768	63.73
Independent	Giovanni Baruffa	723	16.65
Independent	Richard Moreau	616	14.18
Independent	Marc Barrette	236	5.43

=== Hampstead ===
Mayoral candidate	Vote	%
Jeremy Levi	1,187	55.16
William Steinberg (X)	965	44.84

=== Kirkland ===
Mayoral candidate	Vote	%
Michel Gibson (X)	3,680	83.75
Lucien Pigeon	714	16.25

=== Montreal ===
2021 Montreal municipal election: Mayor
Party	Candidate	Votes	%	±%
Projet Montréal	Valérie Plante	217,986	52.14	+0.72
Ensemble Montréal	Denis Coderre	158,751	37.97	-7.69
Mouvement Montréal	Balarama Holness	30,235	7.23	
Action Montréal	Gilbert Thibodeau	4,327	1.03	+0.68
Independent	Beverly Bernardo	1,760	0.42	
Montréal 2021	Luc Ménard	1,666	0.40	
Independent	Jean Duval	1,129	0.27	
Independent	Fang Hu	1,035	0.25	
Independent	Dimitri Mourkes	841	0.20	
Independent	Widler Jules	349	0.08	
Total valid votes		418,079	98.19	
Total rejected ballots		7,687	1.81	-0.59
Turnout		425,766	38.32	-4.15
Eligible voters		1,111,100		
Projet Montréal hold		Swing		+4.21
Source: Elections Montreal

=== Montreal West ===
Mayoral candidate	Vote	%
Beny Masella (X)	Acclaimed	

=== Mount Royal ===
Party	Mayoral candidate	Vote	%
Équipe Peter Malouf	Peter J. Malouf	3710	55.47
United for TMR-Team Setlakwe	Michelle Setlakwe	2978	43.93

Participation – 6779 voters
Rate – 48.7% Number of registered electors – 13,908

=== Pointe-Claire ===
Mayoral candidate	Vote	%
Tim Thomas	4,535	45.91
John Belvedere (X)	4,474	45.30
Lois Butler	868	8.79

=== Westmount ===
Mayoral candidate	Vote	%
Christina Smith (X)	Acclaimed	

== Outaouais ==
=== Cantley ===
Mayoral candidate	Vote	%
David Gomes	1,883	58.21
Aimé Sabourin	1,352	41.79

=== Chelsea ===
Mayoral candidate	Vote	%
Pierre Guénard	1,650	63.51
Shelley Fraser	948	36.49

=== Gatineau ===
2021 Gatineau municipal election: Mayor
Party	Candidate	Popular vote			Expenditures
Party	Candidate	Votes	%	±%	Expenditures
Independent	France Bélisle	29,768	42.86	–	$81,079.89
Action Gatineau	Maude Marquis-Bissonnette	26,151	37.65	-7.46	none listed
Independent	Jean-François Leblanc	11,326	16.31	–	$71,309.44
Independent	Jacques Lemay	1,077	1.55	–	$8,206.19
Independent	Rémi Bergeron	727	1.05	–	$0.00
Independent	Abdelhak Lekbabi	411	0.59	–	none listed
Total valid votes		69,460	99.25		
Total rejected, unmarked and declined votes		524	0.75	-0.98	
Turnout		69,984	35.11	-3.41	
Eligible voters		199,302			
Note: Candidate campaign colours, unless a member of a party, are based on the prominent colour used in campaign items (signs, literature, etc.) or colours used in polling graphs and are used as a visual differentiation between candidates.
Sources: Office of the City Clerk of Gatineau and Élections Québec

=== L'Ange-Gardien ===
Mayoral candidate	Vote	%
Marc Louis-Seize (X)	1,156	80.67
Michel Dambremont	277	19.33

=== La Pêche ===
Mayoral candidate	Vote	%
Guillaume Lamoureux (X)	2,279	72.46
Luc Richard	866	27.54

=== Pontiac ===
Mayoral candidate	Vote	%
Roger Larose	778	39.29
Edward McCann	678	34.24
Joanne Labadie	524	26.46

=== Val-des-Monts ===
Mayoral candidate	Vote	%
Jules Dagenais	1,422	41.82
Michel B. Gauthier	976	28.71
Jean Lafrenière	669	19.68
Serge De Bellefeuille	333	9.79

== Abitibi-Témiscamingue ==
=== Amos ===
Mayoral candidate	Vote	%
Sébastien D'Astous (X)	1,874	59.38
André Brunet	1,282	40.62

=== La Sarre ===
Mayoral candidate	Vote	%
Yves Dubé (X)	Acclaimed	

=== Rouyn-Noranda ===
==== Mayor ====
Mayoral candidate	Vote	%
Diane Dallaire (X)	5,595	46.43
Jean-Marc Belzile	4,995	41.45
Philippe Marquis	1,365	11.33
Vuyani Gxoyiya	96	0.80

==== Rouyn-Noranda City Council ====
Candidate	Vote	%
Noranda-Nord/Lac-Dufault District (1)
Daniel Camden	877	74.96
Ian Marcotte	293	25.04
Rouyn-Noranda-Ouest District (2)
Sylvie Turgeon (X)	Acclaimed	
Rouyn-Sud District (3)
Guillaume Beaulieu	591	63.28
Micheline Berthiaume	222	23.77
Aimé Masuka Pingi	76	8.14
Alexandre Boucher	45	4.82
Centre-Ville District (4)
Claudette Carignan (X)	669	75.00
Jacques Dallaire	223	25.00
Noranda District (5)
Réal Beauchamp	296	35.53
Robert B. Brière	285	34.21
Line Bouchard	252	30.25
de l'Université District (6)
Daniel Bernard	Acclaimed	
Granada/Bellecombe District (7)
Yves Drolet	Acclaimed	
Marie-Victorin/Du Sourire District (8)
Sébastien Côté	1,078	67.00
Piel Côté	531	33.00
Évain District (9)
Samuelle Ramsay-Houle (X)	Acclaimed	
KeKeKo District (10)
Cédric Laplante (X)	Acclaimed	
McWatters/Cadillac District (11)
Benjamin Tremblay (X)	Acclaimed	
Aiguebelle District (12)
Stéphane Girard (X)	Acclaimed	

===== By-election =====
A municipal by-election was intended to be held December 4, 2022, following the election of Daniel Bernard in the 2022 Quebec general election. Louis Dallaire was the only candidate to run, and was therefore elected by acclamation.

Candidate	Vote	%
Louis Dallaire	Acclaimed	

=== Val-d'Or ===
Mayoral candidate	Vote	%
Céline Brindamour	4,586	66.02
Léandre Gervais	2,360	33.98

== Côte-Nord ==
=== Baie-Comeau ===
Mayoral candidate	Vote	%
Yves Montigny (X)	Acclaimed	

==== By-election ====
A mayoral by-election was held February 19, 2023.

Mayoral candidate	Vote	%
Michel Desbiens	3,288	71.85
Sébastien Langlois	1,048	22.90
Gilles Babin	166	3.63
Mario Quinn	74	1.62

=== Port-Cartier ===
Mayoral candidate	Vote	%
Alain Thibault (X)	Acclaimed	

=== Sept-Îles ===
Mayoral candidate	Vote	%
Steeve Beaupré	3,410	50.92
Michel Bellavance	2,973	44.39
Steve Trudel	314	4.69

==== By-election ====
A mayoral by-election was held November 12, 2023, following the resignation of Steeve Beaupré as mayor. The results of the by-election were as follows:

Mayoral candidate	Vote	%
Denis Miousse	1,298	22.39
Patrick Hudon	1,123	19.37
Joey Thibault	1,037	17.89
Mélanie Dorion	822	14.18
Martial Lévesque	668	11.52
Marc Fafard	395	6.81
Éric Beaudry	318	5.49
Mario Dufour	107	1.85
Nunziato Garreffa	29	0.50

== Nord-du-Québec ==
=== Chibougamau ===
Mayoral candidate	Vote	%
Manon Cyr (X)	Acclaimed	

== Gaspésie–Îles-de-la-Madeleine ==
=== Chandler ===
Mayoral candidate	Vote	%
Gilles Daraiche	1,843	49.41
Denis Pelchat	1,375	36.86
Marie-Claire Blais	512	13.73

=== Gaspé ===
Mayoral candidate	Vote	%
Daniel Côté (X)	Acclaimed	

=== Les Îles-de-la-Madeleine ===
Mayoral candidate	Vote	%
Jonathan Lapierre (X)	3,772	87.80
Lise Deveau	524	12.20

==== By-election ====
A by-election was held for mayor on March 5, 2023. The results were as follows:

Mayoral candidate	Vote	%
Antonin Valiquette	3,200	65.87
Nicolas Arseneau	1,593	32.79
Steve Chevarie	35	0.72
Kaven Langford	30	0.62

=== Sainte-Anne-des-Monts ===
Mayoral candidate	Vote	%
Simon Deschênes (X)	Acclaimed	

== Chaudière-Appalaches ==
=== Beauceville ===
Mayoral candidate	Vote	%
François Veilleux (X)	Acclaimed	

=== Lévis ===
==== Mayor ====
Party	Mayoral candidate	Vote	%
Lévis Force 10 - Équipe Lehouillier	Gilles Lehouillier (X)	29,722	74.87
Repensons Lévis	Elhadji Mamadou Diarra	8,242	20.76
Independent	Maryse Labranche	814	2.05
Independent	André Voyer	644	1.62
Independent	Chamroeun Khuon	274	0.69

==== Lévis City Council ====
Saint-Étienne District (1)
Party	Council candidate	Vote	%
Repensons Lévis	Serge Bonin	1,450	51.27
Lévis Force 10 - Équipe Lehouillier	Mario Fortier (X)	1,378	48.73
Saint-Nicolas District (2)
Party	Council candidate	Vote	%
Lévis Force 10 - Équipe Lehouillier	Jeannot Demers	1,515	61.11
Repensons Lévis	Mireille Bélanger	964	38.89
Villieu District (3)
Party	Council candidate	Vote	%
Lévis Force 10 - Équipe Lehouillier	Isabelle Demers (X)	1,908	66.02
Repensons Lévis	Frédéric Bolduc	982	33.98
Saint-Rédempteur District (4)
Party	Council candidate	Vote	%
Lévis Force 10 - Équipe Lehouillier	Réjean Lamontagne (X)	1,841	72.85
Repensons Lévis	Fabrice Coulombe	686	27.15
Charny District (5)
Party	Council candidate	Vote	%
Lévis Force 10 - Équipe Lehouillier	Karine Lavertu (X)	1,719	56.92
Repensons Lévis	Daniel Saindon	1,301	43.08
Breakeyville District (6)
Party	Council candidate	Vote	%
Lévis Force 10 - Équipe Lehouillier	Michel Turner (X)	1,519	62.46
Repensons Lévis	Vanessa Couturier	913	37.54
Saint-Jean District (7)
Party	Council candidate	Vote	%
Lévis Force 10 - Équipe Lehouillier	Guy Dumoulin (X)	1,579	66.99
Repensons Lévis	Gabriel Samson I	778	33.01
Taniata District (8)
Party	Council candidate	Vote	%
Lévis Force 10 - Équipe Lehouillier	Michel Patry	1,821	75.88
Repensons Lévis	Sébastien Arsenault	579	24.13
Saint-Romuald District (9)
Party	Council candidate	Vote	%
Lévis Force 10 - Équipe Lehouillier	Brigitte Duchesneau (X)	1,824	67.06
Repensons Lévis	Francis Duperron	896	32.94
Notre-Dame District (10)
Party	Council candidate	Vote	%
Lévis Force 10 - Équipe Lehouillier	Steve Dorval (X)	1,490	60.30
Repensons Lévis	Monica Beaudet	981	39.70
Saint-David District (11)
Party	Council candidate	Vote	%
Lévis Force 10 - Équipe Lehouillier	Serge Côté (X)	1,845	66.90
Repensons Lévis	Sylvain Gagnon	765	27.74
Independent	David Cantin	148	5.37
Christ-Roi District (12)
Party	Council candidate	Vote	%
Lévis Force 10 - Équipe Lehouillier	Andrée Kronström	2,039	71.85
Repensons Lévis	Gaston Gourde	799	28.15
Bienville District (13)
Party	Council candidate	Vote	%
Lévis Force 10 - Équipe Lehouillier	Amélie Landry (X)	1,626	66.80
Repensons Lévis	Patricia Turcotte	808	33.20
Lauzon District (14)
Party	Council candidate	Vote	%
Lévis Force 10 - Équipe Lehouillier	Fleur Paradis (X)	2,041	65.80
Repensons Lévis	Liz-Ann Picard	1,061	34.20
Pintendre District (15)
Party	Council candidate	Vote	%
Lévis Force 10 - Équipe Lehouillier	Ann Jeffrey (X)	1,231	56.52
Repensons Lévis	Carl Lavoie	947	43.48

==== By-election ====
A by-election was held in Christ-Roi District on February 19, 2023

Party	Candidate	Vote	%
Repensons Lévis	Alexandre Fallu	767	49.29
Lévis Force 10	Pascal Brulotte	756	48.59
Independent	André Voyer	33	2.12

=== Montmagny ===
Mayoral candidate	Vote	%
Marc Laurin	1,943	55.47
Bernard Boulet (X)	1,560	44.53

=== Saint-Apollinaire ===
Mayoral candidate	Vote	%
Jonathan Moreau	Acclaimed	

=== Sainte-Marie ===
Mayoral candidate	Vote	%
Gaétan Vachon (X)	Acclaimed	

=== Saint-Georges ===
Mayoral candidate	Vote	%
Claude Morin (X)	Acclaimed	

=== Saint-Henri ===
Mayoral candidate	Vote	%
Germain Caron (X)	Acclaimed	

=== Saint-Lambert-de-Lauzon ===
Mayoral candidate	Vote	%
Olivier Dumais (X)	Acclaimed	

=== Thetford Mines ===
Mayoral candidate	Vote	%
Marc-Alexandre Brousseau (X)	6,527	77.80
Jean Poulin	930	11.09
François Madore	858	10.23
Christian Mailhot	74	0.88

== Laval ==
=== Mayor ===
Party	Mayoral candidate	Vote	%
Mouvement lavallois - Équipe Stéphane Boyer	Stéphane Boyer	36,620	41.53
Parti Laval - Équipe Michel Trottier	Michel Trottier	22,188	25.16
Action Laval - Équipe Sophie Trottier	Sophie Trottier	21,300	24.16
Laval citoyens - Équipe Michel Poissant	Michel Poissant	4,166	4.72
Ma ville maintenant - Équipe Pierre Anthian	Pierre Anthian	1,785	2.02
Independent	Nicolas Lemire	932	1.06
Independent	Redouane Yahmi	797	0.90
Independent	Hélène Goupil	388	0.44

==== Laval City Council ====
Council results by district

Saint-François District (1)
Party	Council candidate	Vote	%
Action Laval - Équipe Sophie Trottier	Isabelle Piché	1,575	40.50
Mouvement lavallois - Équipe Stéphane Boyer	Eric Morasse (X)	1,106	28.44
Parti Laval - Équipe Michel Trottier	Anne-Marie Bédard	1,092	28.08
Laval citoyens - Équipe Michel Poissant	Rachel Demers	96	2.47
Ma ville maintenant - Équipe Pierre Anthian	Elie Takla	20	0.52
Saint-Vincent-de-Paul District (2)
Party	Council candidate	Vote	%
Action Laval - Équipe Sophie Trottier	Paolo Galati (X)	1,995	46.81
Mouvement lavallois - Équipe Stéphane Boyer	Annick Senghor	1,244	29.19
Parti Laval - Équipe Michel Trottier	Alain Leboeuf	741	17.39
Laval citoyens - Équipe Michel Poissant	Yann Caron	232	5.44
Ma ville maintenant - Équipe Pierre Anthian	Rojar Abdo	50	1.17
Val-des-Arbres District (3)
Party	Council candidate	Vote	%
Action Laval - Équipe Sophie Trottier	Achille Cifelli	1,671	37.59
Mouvement lavallois - Équipe Stéphane Boyer	Anick Brunet	1,608	36.18
Parti Laval - Équipe Michel Trottier	Pascale Veilleux	1,034	23.26
Laval citoyens - Équipe Michel Poissant	Julius Bute	100	2.25
Ma ville maintenant - Équipe Pierre Anthian	Laure El Rayes	32	0.72
Duvernay—Pont-Viau District (4)
Party	Council candidate	Vote	%
Mouvement lavallois - Équipe Stéphane Boyer	Christine Poirier	3,106	72.23
Action Laval - Équipe Sophie Trottier	Vittorino Di Genova	557	12.95
Parti Laval - Équipe Michel Trottier	Claudio Napoleoni	541	12.58
Laval citoyens - Équipe Michel Poissant	Oréa Gatore	96	2.23
Marigot District (5)
Party	Council candidate	Vote	%
Mouvement lavallois - Équipe Stéphane Boyer	Cecilia Macedo	1,600	52.82
Parti Laval - Équipe Michel Trottier	Amel Beddek	715	23.61
Action Laval - Équipe Sophie Trottier	Mongi Zitouni	373	12.31
Ma ville maintenant - Équipe Pierre Anthian	Mélanie Guimond	222	7.33
Laval citoyens - Équipe Michel Poissant	Youness Asrir	119	3.93
Concorde—Bois-de-Boulogne District (6)
Party	Council candidate	Vote	%
Mouvement lavallois - Équipe Stéphane Boyer	Sandra Desmeules (X)	1,758	56.02
Parti Laval - Équipe Michel Trottier	Tommy Vallée	782	24.92
Action Laval - Équipe Sophie Trottier	Nicolas Bouchard	447	14.24
Laval citoyens - Équipe Michel Poissant	Benoit Blanchard	95	3.03
Ma ville maintenant - Équipe Pierre Anthian	Mauro Reyes	56	1.78
Renaud District (7)
Party	Council candidate	Vote	%
Mouvement lavallois - Équipe Stéphane Boyer	Seta Topouzian	1,722	37.60
Action Laval - Équipe Sophie Trottier	Grace Ghazal	1,699	37.10
Parti Laval - Équipe Michel Trottier	Alain Leclair	884	19.30
Laval citoyens - Équipe Michel Poissant	Hafida Daoudi	275	6.00
Vimont District (8)
Party	Council candidate	Vote	%
Mouvement lavallois - Équipe Stéphane Boyer	Pierre Brabant	1,518	33.98
Laval citoyens - Équipe Michel Poissant	France Brazeau	1,134	25.39
Parti Laval - Équipe Michel Trottier	Raynald Hawkins	892	19.97
Action Laval - Équipe Sophie Trottier	Jacynthe Millette-Bilodeau	870	19.48
Ma ville maintenant - Équipe Pierre Anthian	Lindsay Luc	53	1.19
Saint-Bruno District (9)
Party	Council candidate	Vote	%
Action Laval - Équipe Sophie Trottier	David De Cotis (X)	2,744	54.85
Mouvement lavallois - Équipe Stéphane Boyer	Paul-Yanic Laquerre	1,025	20.49
Parti Laval - Équipe Michel Trottier	Karine Ethier	747	14.93
Laval citoyens - Équipe Michel Poissant	Anna Del Bello	440	8.79
Ma ville maintenant - Équipe Pierre Anthian	Emile Lepage	47	0.94
Auteuil District (10)
Party	Council candidate	Vote	%
Mouvement lavallois - Équipe Stéphane Boyer	Jocelyne Frédéric Gauthier (X)	1,865	42.77
Action Laval - Équipe Sophie Trottier	Seylac Try	1,000	22.93
Parti Laval - Équipe Michel Trottier	Dayila Sassy	916	21.00
Ma ville maintenant - Équipe Pierre Anthian	Michel Cantin	276	6.33
Laval citoyens - Équipe Michel Poissant	Cédric Vaillancourt	250	5.73
Independent	Christelle Unubemba	54	1.24
Laval-des-Rapides District (11)
Party	Council candidate	Vote	%
Mouvement lavallois - Équipe Stéphane Boyer	Alexandre Warnet	1,173	30.26
Parti Laval - Équipe Michel Trottier	Andréanne Fiola	1,111	28.66
Action Laval - Équipe Sophie Trottier	Isabella Tassoni (X)	995	25.66
Ma ville maintenant - Équipe Pierre Anthian	Hanane Nasr	474	12.23
Laval citoyens - Équipe Michel Poissant	Micheline Boucher Granger	124	3.20
Souvenir-Labelle District (12)
Party	Council candidate	Vote	%
Mouvement lavallois - Équipe Stéphane Boyer	Sandra El-Helou (X)	1,905	55.59
Parti Laval - Équipe Michel Trottier	Hocine Cherifi	739	21.56
Action Laval - Équipe Sophie Trottier	Viviane Monette	620	18.09
Laval citoyens - Équipe Michel Poissant	Lyne Potvin	85	2.48
Ma ville maintenant - Équipe Pierre Anthian	François Taillon	78	2.28
L'Abord-à-Plouffe District (13)
Party	Council candidate	Vote	%
Mouvement lavallois - Équipe Stéphane Boyer	Vasilios Karidogiannis (X)	1,582	51.40
Parti Laval - Équipe Michel Trottier	Lynne Durand	675	21.93
Action Laval - Équipe Sophie Trottier	Silvana Senattore Perez	631	20.50
Laval citoyens - Équipe Michel Poissant	Hugo Martin	109	3.54
Ma ville maintenant - Équipe Pierre Anthian	Éric Drouin	81	2.63
Chomedey District (14)
Party	Council candidate	Vote	%
Action Laval - Équipe Sophie Trottier	Aglaia Revelakis (X)	1,620	52.19
Mouvement lavallois - Équipe Stéphane Boyer	Omar Waedh	704	22.68
Parti Laval - Équipe Michel Trottier	Evangelia Tsakiris	669	21.55
Laval citoyens - Équipe Michel Poissant	Marie-Josée Duval	111	3.58
Saint-Martin District (15)
Party	Council candidate	Vote	%
Mouvement lavallois - Équipe Stéphane Boyer	Aline Dib (X)	1,869	46.48
Action Laval - Équipe Sophie Trottier	Nicolas Macrozonaris	1,184	29.45
Parti Laval - Équipe Michel Trottier	Abderrahman Essayh	780	19.40
Laval citoyens - Équipe Michel Poissant	Chantal Rodney	104	2.59
Ma ville maintenant - Équipe Pierre Anthian	Emmanuel Pierre-Lys	45	1.12
Independent	Marco Mellado	39	0.97
Sainte-Dorothée District (16)
Party	Council candidate	Vote	%
Mouvement lavallois - Équipe Stéphane Boyer	Ray Khalil (X)	1,726	37.60
Action Laval - Équipe Sophie Trottier	Lydia Aboulian	1,424	31.02
Parti Laval - Équipe Michel Trottier	Céline Blanchette	1,267	27.60
Laval citoyens - Équipe Michel Poissant	Adrian Nedelcu	122	2.66
Ma ville maintenant - Équipe Pierre Anthian	Marie Anne Hervieux-Plouffe	51	1.11
Laval-les-Îles District (17)
Party	Council candidate	Vote	%
Mouvement lavallois - Équipe Stéphane Boyer	Nicholas Borne (X)	2,301	53.26
Parti Laval - Équipe Michel Trottier	Liane Dufour	1,200	27.78
Action Laval - Équipe Sophie Trottier	Christian Le Bouc	554	12.82
Laval citoyens - Équipe Michel Poissant	Louis-Martin Beaumont	265	6.13
L'Orée-des-Bois District (18)
Party	Council candidate	Vote	%
Mouvement lavallois - Équipe Stéphane Boyer	Yannick Langlois (X)	2,268	53.92
Parti Laval - Équipe Michel Trottier	Denis Guillemette	976	23.20
Action Laval - Équipe Sophie Trottier	Marc Patrick Roy	719	17.09
Laval citoyens - Équipe Michel Poissant	Howard Romanado	143	3.40
Ma ville maintenant - Équipe Pierre Anthian	Grégoire Bergeron	100	2.38
Marc-Aurèle-Fortin District (19)
Party	Council candidate	Vote	%
Parti Laval - Équipe Michel Trottier	Louise Lortie	2,416	45.94
Mouvement lavallois - Équipe Stéphane Boyer	Francine LeBlanc	1,718	32.67
Action Laval - Équipe Sophie Trottier	Elias Nassif	843	16.03
Laval citoyens - Équipe Michel Poissant	Khalid Ould El Gadia	235	4.47
Ma ville maintenant - Équipe Pierre Anthian	Pierre Prévost	47	0.89
Fabreville District (20)
Party	Council candidate	Vote	%
Parti Laval - Équipe Michel Trottier	Claude Larochelle (X)	2,623	48.11
Mouvement lavallois - Équipe Stéphane Boyer	Marc Langlois	1,721	31.57
Action Laval - Équipe Sophie Trottier	Philippe Njomo	785	14.40
Laval citoyens - Équipe Michel Poissant	Danny Pawchuk	323	5.92
Sainte-Rose District (21)
Party	Council candidate	Vote	%
Mouvement lavallois - Équipe Stéphane Boyer	Flavia Alexandra Novac	2,512	50.13
Parti Laval - Équipe Michel Trottier	Jacques Roberge	1,560	31.13
Action Laval - Équipe Sophie Trottier	Marie-Hélène Dubé	685	13.67
Laval citoyens - Équipe Michel Poissant	Gilles Gervais	185	3.69
Ma ville maintenant - Équipe Pierre Anthian	Daphnée Kaya Riverin	69	1.38

== Lanaudière ==
=== Charlemagne ===
Party	Mayoral candidate	Vote	%
Équipe Charlemagne	Normand Grenier (X)	Acclaimed	

=== Joliette ===
Party	Mayoral candidate	Vote	%
Vision Joliette - Équipe Pierre-Luc Bellerose	Pierre-Luc Bellerose	Acclaimed	

=== L'Assomption ===
Party	Mayoral candidate	Vote	%
Vision L'Assomption - Équipe Sébastien Nadeau	Sébastien Nadeau (X)	Acclaimed	

=== Lavaltrie ===
Mayoral candidate	Vote	%
Christian Goulet (X)	Acclaimed	

=== L'Épiphanie ===
Party	Mayoral candidate	Vote	%
Équipe Steve Plante - L'Épiphanie en action	Steve Plante (X)	Acclaimed	

=== Mascouche ===
==== Mayor ====
Party	Mayoral candidate	Vote	%
Vision démocratique de Mascouche - Équipe Guillaume Tremblay	Guillaume Tremblay (X)	8,999	83.29
Independent	François Collin	1,298	12.01
Independent	Line Lavallée	287	2.66
Independent	Flora Almeida Marlow	221	2.05

==== Mascouche City Council ====
Louis-Hébert District (1)
Party	Council candidate	Vote	%
Vision démocratique de Mascouche - Équipe Guillaume Tremblay	Michèle Demers	Acclaimed	
Laurier District (2)
Party	Council candidate	Vote	%
Vision démocratique de Mascouche - Équipe Guillaume Tremblay	Eugène Jolicoeur (X)	Acclaimed	
Le Gardeur District (3)
Party	Council candidate	Vote	%
Vision démocratique de Mascouche - Équipe Guillaume Tremblay	Anny Mailloux (X)	Acclaimed	
La Vérendrye District (4)
Party	Council candidate	Vote	%
Vision démocratique de Mascouche - Équipe Guillaume Tremblay	Darllie Pierre-Louis	Acclaimed	
Du Côteau District (5)
Party	Council candidate	Vote	%
Vision démocratique de Mascouche - Équipe Guillaume Tremblay	Bertrand Lefebvre (X)	1,014	73.32
Independent	Dany Goulet	369	26.68
Des Hauts-Bois District (6)
Party	Council candidate	Vote	%
Vision démocratique de Mascouche - Équipe Guillaume Tremblay	Éric Ladouceur	1,020	82.39
Independent	Pierre-Alexandre Bugeaud	218	17.61
Du Rucher District (7)
Party	Council candidate	Vote	%
Vision démocratique de Mascouche - Équipe Guillaume Tremblay	Lise Gagnon	1,183	81.98
Independent	Fabienne Robert	260	18.02
Du Manoir District (8)
Party	Council candidate	Vote	%
Vision démocratique de Mascouche - Équipe Guillaume Tremblay	Patricia Lebel	1,156	85.88
Independent	Stéphane Durupt	190	14.12

=== Notre-Dame-des-Prairies ===
Mayoral candidate	Vote	%
Suzanne Dauphin (X)	Acclaimed	

=== Rawdon ===
Party	Mayoral candidate	Vote	%
Équipe Raymond Rougeau - Pour Rawdon	Raymond Rougeau	2,221	60.87
Alliance Rawdon	Chantal Grenier	1,428	39.13

=== Repentigny ===
==== Mayor ====
Party	Mayoral candidate	Vote	%
Avenir Repentigny - Équipe Nicolas Dufour	Nicolas Dufour	17,391	61.94
Repentigny ensemble - Équipe Éric Chartré	Éric Chartré	8,397	29.91
Parti Démocratique de Repentigny-Le Gardeur	Martin Nadon	2,290	8.16

==== Repentigny City Council ====
District 1
Party	Council candidate	Vote	%
Avenir Repentigny - Équipe Nicolas Dufour	Raymond Masse	1,485	61.36
Repentigny ensemble - Équipe Éric Chartré	Josée Mailhot (X)	809	33.43
Parti Démocratique de Repentigny-Le Gardeur	Daniel Bleau	126	5.21
District 2
Party	Council candidate	Vote	%
Avenir Repentigny - Équipe Nicolas Dufour	Jacques Prescott	1,109	59.50
Repentigny ensemble - Équipe Éric Chartré	Manon Boudreau	603	32.25
Parti Démocratique de Repentigny-Le Gardeur	Sonya Arseneault	152	8.15
District 3
Party	Council candidate	Vote	%
Avenir Repentigny - Équipe Nicolas Dufour	Karine Benoit	1,193	60.25
Repentigny ensemble - Équipe Éric Chartré	Alain Boudreau	616	31.11
Parti Démocratique de Repentigny-Le Gardeur	Katherine Laverdure	171	8.64
District 4
Party	Council candidate	Vote	%
Avenir Repentigny - Équipe Nicolas Dufour	Luc Rhéaume	1,181	50.47
Repentigny ensemble - Équipe Éric Chartré	Cécile Hénault (X)	1,041	44.49
Parti Démocratique de Repentigny-Le Gardeur	Sophie El Debs	118	5.04
District 5
Party	Council candidate	Vote	%
Avenir Repentigny - Équipe Nicolas Dufour	Bernard Landreville	1,335	50.02
Repentigny ensemble - Équipe Éric Chartré	Jean-Philippe Simard	1,222	45.78
Parti Démocratique de Repentigny-Le Gardeur	Giuliano Carola	112	4.20
District 6
Party	Council candidate	Vote	%
Avenir Repentigny - Équipe Nicolas Dufour	Martine Roux	1,166	47.94
Repentigny ensemble - Équipe Éric Chartré	Sylvain Benoit (X)	1,114	45.81
Parti Démocratique de Repentigny-Le Gardeur	Dave McGraw	152	6.25
District 7
Party	Council candidate	Vote	%
Avenir Repentigny - Équipe Nicolas Dufour	Joubert Simon	1,706	64.16
Repentigny ensemble - Équipe Éric Chartré	Lucie Fortin	750	28.21
Parti Démocratique de Repentigny-Le Gardeur	Alexandra Berardo	203	7.63
District 8
Party	Council candidate	Vote	%
Avenir Repentigny - Équipe Nicolas Dufour	Jennifer Robillard (X)	1,286	62.49
Repentigny ensemble - Équipe Éric Chartré	Mélissa Pierre	644	31.29
Parti Démocratique de Repentigny-Le Gardeur	Nacima Saker	128	6.22
District 9
Party	Council candidate	Vote	%
Avenir Repentigny - Équipe Nicolas Dufour	Martine Gendron	1,339	49.91
Parti Démocratique de Repentigny-Le Gardeur	Jean Langlois (X)	799	29.78
Repentigny ensemble - Équipe Éric Chartré	Josée Laflamme	545	20.31
District 10
Party	Council candidate	Vote	%
Avenir Repentigny - Équipe Nicolas Dufour	Kevin Buteau (X)	1,681	68.08
Repentigny ensemble - Équipe Éric Chartré	Éric Dostaler	673	27.26
Parti Démocratique de Repentigny-Le Gardeur	Jean Pascal Nérisma	115	4.66
District 11
Party	Council candidate	Vote	%
Avenir Repentigny - Équipe Nicolas Dufour	Chantal Routhier (X)	1,536	62.72
Repentigny ensemble - Équipe Éric Chartré	Francine Cinq-Mars	625	25.52
Parti Démocratique de Repentigny-Le Gardeur	Éric Lachance	288	11.76
District 12
Party	Council candidate	Vote	%
Avenir Repentigny - Équipe Nicolas Dufour	Normand Urbain	1,203	57.56
Repentigny ensemble - Équipe Éric Chartré	François Longpré	582	27.85
Parti Démocratique de Repentigny-Le Gardeur	Jacques Raymond	395	14.59

=== Saint-Calixte ===
Party	Mayoral candidate	Vote	%
Tous ensemble pour Saint-Calixte	Michel Jasmin (X)	717	38.84
Équipe la relance - Saint-Calixte	Marc Michaud	651	35.27
Union pour le changement	Keven Bouchard	478	25.89

=== Saint-Charles-Borromée ===
Mayoral candidate	Vote	%
Robert Bibeau (X)	1,519	67.96
Jean-Patrice Rivest	716	32.04

=== Sainte-Julienne ===
Party	Mayoral candidate	Vote	%
Équipe Richard Desormiers	Richard Desormiers	1,477	41.66
Équipe Jean-Pierre Charron - L'avenir de Sainte-Julienne	Jean-Pierre Charron (X)	1,460	41.18
Équipe des citoyens	François Drolet	608	17.15

==== By-election ====
A mayoral by-election was held December, 2022, following the resignation of Richard Desormiers as mayor. The results of the by-election were as follows:

Mayoral candidate	Vote	%
Jean-Pierre Charron	1,298	60.23
Yannick Thibeault	857	39.77

=== Saint-Félix-de-Valois ===
Party	Mayoral candidate	Vote	%
Saint-Félix ensemble	Audrey Boisjoly (X)	Acclaimed	

=== Saint-Lin–Laurentides ===
Party	Mayoral candidate	Vote	%
Coalition Saint-Lin-Laurentides - Équipe Mathieu Maisonneuve	Mathieu Maisonneuve	2,041	60.58
Independent	François Lacasse	957	28.41
Independent	Robert Jobin	371	11.01

=== Saint-Paul ===
Mayoral candidate	Vote	%
Alain Bellemare (X)	893	64.80
Paul Elie Hioba Hioba	485	35.20

=== Saint-Roch-de-l'Achigan ===
Mayoral candidate	Vote	%
Sébastien Marcil	1,331	82.26
Georges Locas	287	17.74

=== Terrebonne ===
==== Mayor ====
Party	Mayoral candidate	Vote	%
Mouvement Terrebonne - Équipe Mathieu Traversy	Mathieu Traversy	25,293	77.20
Alliance démocratique Terrebonne - Équipe du maire Marc-André Plante	Marc-André Plante (X)	6,898	21.05
Independent	Simon Berleur	574	1.75

==== Terrebonne City Council ====
Saint-Joachim District (1)
Party	Council candidate	Vote	%
Mouvement Terrebonne - Équipe Mathieu Traversy	Vicky Mokas	910	59.01
Alliance démocratique Terrebonne - Équipe du maire Marc-André Plante	Brigitte Villeneuve (X)	476	30.87
Independent	Ève Duhamel	156	10.12
Du Boisé-Laurier District (2)
Party	Council candidate	Vote	%
Mouvement Terrebonne - Équipe Mathieu Traversy	Raymond Berthiaume	1,153	61.82
Alliance démocratique Terrebonne - Équipe du maire Marc-André Plante	Nathalie Bellavance (X)	667	35.76
Independent	Katy Duchesne	45	2.41
Du Ruisseau Noir District (3)
Party	Council candidate	Vote	%
Mouvement Terrebonne - Équipe Mathieu Traversy	Nathalie Lepage (X)	1,093	66.85
Alliance démocratique Terrebonne - Équipe du maire Marc-André Plante	Dany St-Pierre (X)	486	29.72
Independent	Hélène Michaud	56	3.43
Terrebonne-Ouest District (4)
Party	Council candidate	Vote	%
Mouvement Terrebonne - Équipe Mathieu Traversy	Anna Guarnieri	973	49.62
Independent	Réal Leclerc (X)	576	29.37
Alliance démocratique Terrebonne - Équipe du maire Marc-André Plante	Louise Arbour	412	21.01
Grand Ruisseau District (5)
Party	Council candidate	Vote	%
Mouvement Terrebonne - Équipe Mathieu Traversy	Claudia Abaunza	1,235	66.47
Alliance démocratique Terrebonne - Équipe du maire Marc-André Plante	Serge Gagnon (X)	623	33.53
Comtois-La Pinière District (6)
Party	Council candidate	Vote	%
Mouvement Terrebonne - Équipe Mathieu Traversy	Valérie Doyon	1,419	69.80
Alliance démocratique Terrebonne - Équipe du maire Marc-André Plante	Éric Fortin (X)	614	30.20
Côte de Terrebonne District (7)
Party	Council candidate	Vote	%
Mouvement Terrebonne - Équipe Mathieu Traversy	Marie-Eve Couturier	2,025	86.89
Alliance démocratique Terrebonne - Équipe du maire Marc-André Plante	Yan Maisonneuve (X)	311	13.31
Saint-Jean-Baptiste District (8)
Party	Council candidate	Vote	%
Mouvement Terrebonne - Équipe Mathieu Traversy	Carl Miguel Maldonado	2,199	80.99
Alliance démocratique Terrebonne - Équipe du maire Marc-André Plante	Annie Claude De Paoli	265	9.76
Independent	Caroline Desbiens (X)	241	9.24
La Sablière-Hauteville District (9)
Party	Council candidate	Vote	%
Mouvement Terrebonne - Équipe Mathieu Traversy	Benoit Ladouceur	1,843	79.75
Alliance démocratique Terrebonne - Équipe du maire Marc-André Plante	Simon Paquin (X)	441	19.08
Independent	Maxime Houle	27	1.17
Centre-Ville District (10)
Party	Council candidate	Vote	%
Mouvement Terrebonne - Équipe Mathieu Traversy	Robert Morin (X)	1,620	78.72
Alliance démocratique Terrebonne - Équipe du maire Marc-André Plante	Dave Armstrong	284	13.80
Nouvel Élan Terrebonne - Équipe Valérie Quevillon	Valérie Quevillon	154	7.48
Seigneurie-Île-Saint-Jean District (11)
Party	Council candidate	Vote	%
Mouvement Terrebonne - Équipe Mathieu Traversy	Daniel Aucoin	1,561	82.03
Alliance démocratique Terrebonne - Équipe du maire Marc-André Plante	Nathalie Ricard (X)	342	17.97
Vieux-Terrebonne District (12)
Party	Council candidate	Vote	%
Mouvement Terrebonne - Équipe Mathieu Traversy	André Fontaine (X)	1,771	87.98
Alliance démocratique Terrebonne - Équipe du maire Marc-André Plante	Martin Gince	242	12.02
Coteau-des Vignobles District (13)
Party	Council candidate	Vote	%
Mouvement Terrebonne - Équipe Mathieu Traversy	Robert Auger	1,397	66.46
Alliance démocratique Terrebonne - Équipe du maire Marc-André Plante	Jacques Demers (X)	705	33.54
Charles-Aubert District (14)
Party	Council candidate	Vote	%
Mouvement Terrebonne - Équipe Mathieu Traversy	Michel Corbeil	1,900	86.01
Alliance démocratique Terrebonne - Équipe du maire Marc-André Plante	Roch Lachance	309	13.99
Saint-Charles—Des Fleurs District (15)
Party	Council candidate	Vote	%
Mouvement Terrebonne - Équipe Mathieu Traversy	Sonia Leblanc	1,427	69.54
Alliance démocratique Terrebonne - Équipe du maire Marc-André Plante	Guylène Mathieu	625	30.46
Des Pionniers District (16)
Party	Council candidate	Vote	%
Mouvement Terrebonne - Équipe Mathieu Traversy	Marc-André Michaud (X)	1,705	77.96
Alliance démocratique Terrebonne - Équipe du maire Marc-André Plante	Francis Ménard	482	22.04

== Laurentides ==
=== Blainville ===
==== Mayor ====
Party	Mayoral candidate	Vote	%
Vrai Blainville - Équipe Liza Poulin	Liza Poulin	10,732	79.55
Mouvement Blainville - Équipe Florent Gravel	Florent Gravel	2,759	20.45

==== Blainville City Council ====
Fontainebleau District (1)
Party	Council candidate	Vote	%
Vrai Blainville - Équipe Liza Poulin	Marie-Claude Perron	913	73.99
Mouvement Blainville - Équipe Florent Gravel	Guylaine Beaudoin	321	26.01
de la Côte-Saint-Louis District (2)
Party	Council candidate	Vote	%
Vrai Blainville - Équipe Liza Poulin	David Malenfant	773	84.20
Mouvement Blainville - Équipe Florent Gravel	Sébastien Larouche-Champagne	145	15.80
Saint-Rédempteur District (3)
Party	Council candidate	Vote	%
Vrai Blainville - Équipe Liza Poulin	Serge Paquette (X)	753	82.75
Mouvement Blainville - Équipe Florent Gravel	Normand Godin	157	17.25
du Plan-Bouchard District (4)
Party	Council candidate	Vote	%
Vrai Blainville - Équipe Liza Poulin	Philippe Magnenat	945	74.06
Mouvement Blainville - Équipe Florent Gravel	Pascale Gravel	331	25.94
Notre-Dame-de-l'Assomption District (5)
Party	Council candidate	Vote	%
Vrai Blainville - Équipe Liza Poulin	Francis Allaire	934	79.42
Mouvement Blainville - Équipe Florent Gravel	Gautier Njokou Tchoutang	242	20.58
Chante-Bois District (6)
Party	Council candidate	Vote	%
Vrai Blainville - Équipe Liza Poulin	Nicole Ruel (X)	1,090	82.51
Mouvement Blainville - Équipe Florent Gravel	Karine Lefrançois	231	17.49
des Hirondelles District (7)
Party	Council candidate	Vote	%
Vrai Blainville - Équipe Liza Poulin	Patrick Marineau (X)	982	79.58
Mouvement Blainville - Équipe Florent Gravel	Amélie Charest	252	20.42
Alençon District (8)
Party	Council candidate	Vote	%
Vrai Blainville - Équipe Liza Poulin	Stéphane Bertrand (X)	950	81.69
Mouvement Blainville - Équipe Florent Gravel	Sylvie Robberts	213	18.31
de la Renaissance District (9)
Party	Council candidate	Vote	%
Vrai Blainville - Équipe Liza Poulin	Michèle Murray (X)	694	80.42
Mouvement Blainville - Équipe Florent Gravel	Louise Fillion	169	19.58
du Blainvillier District (10)
Party	Council candidate	Vote	%
Vrai Blainville - Équipe Liza Poulin	Marie-Claude Collin (X)	1,054	75.45
Mouvement Blainville - Équipe Florent Gravel	Linda Baker	343	24.55
Coteau District (11)
Party	Council candidate	Vote	%
Vrai Blainville - Équipe Liza Poulin	Stéphane Dufour (X)	662	67.69
Mouvement Blainville - Équipe Florent Gravel	David Mireault	316	32.31
Henri-Dunant District (12)
Party	Council candidate	Vote	%
Vrai Blainville - Équipe Liza Poulin	Jean-François Pinard (X)	730	75.49
Mouvement Blainville - Équipe Florent Gravel	Francisco Morais	237	24.51

=== Boisbriand ===
Party	Mayoral candidate	Vote	%
Independent	Christine Beaudette	4,507	53.21
Équipe Marlene Cordato - Ralliement des citoyens de Boisbriand	Marlene Cordato (X)	3,963	46.79

=== Bois-des-Filion ===
Party	Mayoral candidate	Vote	%
Équipe Blanchette - Projet filionois	Gilles Blanchette (X)	Acclaimed	

=== Brownsburg-Chatham ===
Mayoral candidate	Vote	%
Kévin Maurice	1,197	54.68
Gilles Galarneau	909	41.53
Mario Tiscione	83	3.79
Catherine Trickey (X)	Withdrew	

=== Deux-Montagnes ===
Party	Mayoral candidate	Vote	%
Deux-Montagnes autrement - Denis Martin Team	Denis Martin (X)	Acclaimed	

=== Lachute ===
Party	Mayoral candidate	Vote	%
Équipe vision Lachute	Bernard Bigras-Denis	2,465	62.01
Independent	Carl Péloquin (X)	1,510	37.99

=== Lorraine ===
Party	Mayoral candidate	Vote	%
Équipe Comtois	Jean Comtois (X)	Acclaimed	

=== Mirabel ===
==== Mayor ====
Party	Mayoral candidate	Vote	%
Action Mirabel - Équipe Charbonneau	Patrick Charbonneau	8,797	58.11
Mouvement citoyen Mirabel	David Marra-Hurtubise	6,342	41.89

==== Mirabel City Council ====
District 1
Party	Council candidate	Vote	%
Action Mirabel - Équipe Charbonneau	Michel Lauzon (X)	733	56.52
Mouvement citoyen Mirabel	Jonathan Thérien	564	43.48
District 2
Party	Council candidate	Vote	%
Action Mirabel - Équipe Charbonneau	Guylaine Coursol (X)	906	67.92
Mouvement citoyen Mirabel	Julie Trépanier	428	32.08
District 3
Party	Council candidate	Vote	%
Action Mirabel - Équipe Charbonneau	Robert Charron (X)	861	60.17
Mouvement citoyen Mirabel	David Bélanger	570	39.83
District 4
Party	Council candidate	Vote	%
Action Mirabel - Équipe Charbonneau	François Bélanger (X)	724	50.74
Mouvement citoyen Mirabel	Patrick Rebelo	703	49.26
District 5
Party	Council candidate	Vote	%
Action Mirabel - Équipe Charbonneau	Roxanne Therrien	804	61.23
Mouvement citoyen Mirabel	Jonathan Landry-Leclerc	509	38.77
District 6
Party	Council candidate	Vote	%
Action Mirabel - Équipe Charbonneau	Francine Charles (X)	1,061	59.31
Mouvement citoyen Mirabel	Stéphanie Béland	728	40.69
District 7
Party	Council candidate	Vote	%
Mouvement citoyen Mirabel	Émilie Derganc	889	53.04
Action Mirabel - Équipe Charbonneau	Yannick Bibeau	787	46.96
District 8
Party	Council candidate	Vote	%
Action Mirabel - Équipe Charbonneau	Isabelle Gauthier (X)	1,101	69.77
Mouvement citoyen Mirabel	Michèle Robitaille	477	30.23
District 9
Party	Council candidate	Vote	%
Action Mirabel - Équipe Charbonneau	Marc Laurin (X)	1,103	63.72
Mouvement citoyen Mirabel	Roland Grenier	628	36.28
District 10
Party	Council candidate	Vote	%
Mouvement citoyen Mirabel	Catherine Maréchal	932	58.73
Action Mirabel - Équipe Charbonneau	Marie St-Aubin	655	41.27

=== Mont-Laurier ===
Mayoral candidate	Vote	%
Daniel Bourdon (X)	Acclaimed	

=== Mont-Tremblant ===
Party	Mayoral candidate	Vote	%
Équipe Brisebois	Luc Brisebois (X)	2,514	54.45
Équipe Savard	Michel Savard	2,103	45.55

=== Pointe-Calumet ===
Party	Mayoral candidate	Vote	%
Équipe Sonia Fontaine	Sonia Fontaine (X)	1,150	57.93
Équipe Michel Grimard	Michel Grimard	835	42.07

=== Prévost ===
Party	Mayoral candidate	Vote	%
Renouveau prévostois avec Paul Germain	Paul Germain (X)	Acclaimed	

=== Rosemère ===
Party	Mayoral candidate	Vote	%
Équipe innovaction plus Team - Rosemère	Eric Westram (X)	2,897	54.76
Collectif avenir Rosemère	Pierre-André Geoffrion	2,393	45.24

=== Saint-Colomban ===
Party	Mayoral candidate	Vote	%
Ensemble Saint-Colomban	Xavier-Antoine Lalande (X)	Acclaimed	

=== Sainte-Adèle ===
Party	Mayoral candidate	Vote	%
Independent	Michèle Lalonde	2,461	66.12
Parti action Sainte-Adèle	Benoit Huard	1,261	33.88

=== Sainte-Agathe-des-Monts ===
Party	Mayoral candidate	Vote	%
Vision action Sainte-Agathe-des-Monts - Équipe Broué	Frédéric Broué	1,944	47.59
Équipe Julie Tourangeau	Julie Tourangeau	1,487	36.40
Équipe Denis Lanthier	Denis Lanthier	654	16.01

=== Sainte-Anne-des-Plaines ===
Party	Mayoral candidate	Vote	%
Parti Vision Action	Julie Boivin	Acclaimed	

=== Sainte-Marthe-sur-le-Lac ===
Party	Mayoral candidate	Vote	%
Voix citoyenne - Équipe François Robillard	François Robillard	5,093	76.48
Nouvelle Option - Équipe Paulus	Sonia Paulus (X)	1,026	15.41
Gestion responsable S.M.S.L.L.	Hubert Bastien	540	8.11

=== Sainte-Sophie ===
Party	Mayoral candidate	Vote	%
Accent Sainte-Sophie - Équipe Lamothe	Guy Lamothe	1,152	31.23
Absolument Sainte-Sophie - Équipe Astri	Sophie Astri	1,090	29.55
Ensemble Sainte-Sophie - Équipe Bazusky	Olga Bazusky	846	22.93
Vision Sainte-Sophie - Équipe Lamontagne	Claude Lamontagne	601	16.29

=== Sainte-Thérèse ===
Party	Mayoral candidate	Vote	%
Parti citoyen	Christian Charron	3,588	50.49
Parti Municipal Énergie avec Sylvie Surprenant	Sylvie Surprenant (X)	3,519	49.51

=== Saint-Eustache ===
==== Mayor ====
Party	Mayoral candidate	Vote	%
Option Saint-Eustache - Équipe Pierre Charron	Pierre Charron (X)	8,330	77.74
Mouvement eustachois - Équipe Lévesque	Jacinthe Ladouceur	2,385	22.26

==== Saint-Eustache City Council ====
Vieux-Saint-Eustache District (1)
Party	Council candidate	Vote	%
Option Saint-Eustache - Équipe Pierre Charron	Michèle Labelle (X)	598	78.89
Mouvement eustachois - Équipe Lévesque	Yannick Pagé	160	21.11
du Carrefour District (2)
Party	Council candidate	Vote	%
Option Saint-Eustache - Équipe Pierre Charron	Sylvie Mallette (X)	624	68.12
Mouvement eustachois - Équipe Lévesque	Denis Paré	292	31.88
Rivière-Nord District (3)
Party	Council candidate	Vote	%
Option Saint-Eustache - Équipe Pierre Charron	Patrice Paquette (X)	1,276	89.99
Mouvement eustachois - Équipe Lévesque	Danyka Généreux	142	10.01
des Érables District (4)
Party	Council candidate	Vote	%
Option Saint-Eustache - Équipe Pierre Charron	Daniel Goyer	1,053	80.57
Mouvement eustachois - Équipe Lévesque	Robert Laurin	254	19.43
Clair Matin District (5)
Party	Council candidate	Vote	%
Option Saint-Eustache - Équipe Pierre Charron	Marc Lamarre (X)	Acclaimed	
de la Seigneurie District (6)
Party	Council candidate	Vote	%
Independent	Isabelle Mattioli (X)	583	49.74
Option Saint-Eustache - Équipe Pierre Charron	Guillaume Lalonde	398	33.96
Independent	Julie Desmarais	191	16.30
des Moissons District (7)
Party	Council candidate	Vote	%
Option Saint-Eustache - Équipe Pierre Charron	Isabelle Lefebvre (X)	917	87.33
Mouvement eustachois - Équipe Lévesque	Samuel Lévesque	133	12.67
des Îles District (8)
Party	Council candidate	Vote	%
Option Saint-Eustache - Équipe Pierre Charron	Raymond Tessier (X)	Acclaimed	
Plateau-des-Chênes District (9)
Party	Council candidate	Vote	%
Option Saint-Eustache - Équipe Pierre Charron	Nicole Carignan-Lefebvre (X)	Acclaimed	
des Jardins District (10)
Party	Council candidate	Vote	%
Option Saint-Eustache - Équipe Pierre Charron	Yves Roy (X)	685	67.24
Mouvement eustachois - Équipe Lévesque	Paul Sauriol	324	32.76

=== Saint-Hippolyte ===
Party	Mayoral candidate	Vote	%
Équipe Yves Dagenais	Yves Dagenais	1,470	81.26
Independent	Pierre Dionne Labelle	339	18.74

=== Saint-Jérôme ===
==== Mayor ====
Party	Mayoral candidate	Vote	%
Avenir Saint-Jérôme - Équipe Marc Bourcier	Marc Bourcier	7,945	43.48
Mouvement jérômien	Marc-Olivier Neveu	5,165	28.27
Vision Saint-Jérôme	Janice Bélair Rolland (X)	5,163	28.25

==== Saint-Jérôme City Council ====
District 1
Party	Council candidate	Vote	%
Avenir Saint-Jérôme - Équipe Marc Bourcier	Ronald Raymond	490	32.24
Mouvement jérômien	Rémi Barbeau	474	31.18
Vision Saint-Jérôme	Élisabeth Alarie	293	19.28
Independent	Louis-Philippe Beaulieu	263	17.30
District 2
Party	Council candidate	Vote	%
Avenir Saint-Jérôme - Équipe Marc Bourcier	Stéphane Joyal	565	40.65
Vision Saint-Jérôme	Mylène Laframboise (X)	478	34.39
Mouvement jérômien	Moise Mayo Vuanda	347	24.96
District 3
Party	Council candidate	Vote	%
Mouvement jérômien	Jacques Bouchard	535	36.44
Avenir Saint-Jérôme - Équipe Marc Bourcier	Stéphanie Tremblay	519	35.35
Vision Saint-Jérôme	François Poirier (X)	414	28.20
District 4
Party	Council candidate	Vote	%
Avenir Saint-Jérôme - Équipe Marc Bourcier	Dominic Boyer	718	47.27
Mouvement jérômien	Alain Langlois	520	34.23
Vision Saint-Jérôme	Éric Bak (X)	281	18.50
District 5
Party	Council candidate	Vote	%
Avenir Saint-Jérôme - Équipe Marc Bourcier	Carla Pierre-Paul	460	40.93
Vision Saint-Jérôme	Tharrie Theb	345	30.69
Mouvement jérômien	Mirna Sarkis	275	24.47
Independent	Laurence Vialle	44	3.91
District 6
Party	Council candidate	Vote	%
Avenir Saint-Jérôme - Équipe Marc Bourcier	Jean Junior Désormeaux	574	37.69
Vision Saint-Jérôme	Benoit Delage (X)	552	36.24
Mouvement jérômien	Jessica Riggi	397	26.07
District 7
Party	Council candidate	Vote	%
Avenir Saint-Jérôme - Équipe Marc Bourcier	Michel Gagnon	709	45.95
Mouvement jérômien	Simon Lynch	462	29.94
Vision Saint-Jérôme	Chantale Lambert (X)	372	24.11
District 8
Party	Council candidate	Vote	%
Mouvement jérômien	Marc-Antoine Lachance	641	41.76
Avenir Saint-Jérôme - Équipe Marc Bourcier	Carole Savoie	495	32.25
Vision Saint-Jérôme	Alexandre Paradis	399	25.99
District 9
Party	Council candidate	Vote	%
Avenir Saint-Jérôme - Équipe Marc Bourcier	André Marion	519	41.79
Vision Saint-Jérôme	Sophie St-Gelais	396	31.88
Mouvement jérômien	Johanne Dicaire (X)	327	26.33
District 10
Party	Council candidate	Vote	%
Avenir Saint-Jérôme - Équipe Marc Bourcier	Mario Fauteux	691	41.28
Vision Saint-Jérôme	Kim Quintal	627	37.46
Mouvement jérômien	Pierre-Paul Bourdages	356	21.27
District 11
Party	Council candidate	Vote	%
Avenir Saint-Jérôme - Équipe Marc Bourcier	Martin Pigeon	819	41.65
Mouvement jérômien	Michael Njong	640	32.47
Vision Saint-Jérôme	Richard Vermette	512	25.98
District 12
Party	Council candidate	Vote	%
Avenir Saint-Jérôme - Équipe Marc Bourcier	Nathalie Lasalle (X)	760	44.63
Vision Saint-Jérôme	Kathrine Boyer	610	35.82
Mouvement jérômien	Emmanuelle Karine Lauzon	333	19.55

=== Saint-Joseph-du-Lac ===
Party	Mayoral candidate	Vote	%
Équipe Benoit Proulx	Benoit Proulx (X)	Acclaimed	

=== Saint-Sauveur ===
Party	Mayoral candidate	Vote	%
Équipe Jacques Gariépy	Jacques Gariépy (X)	1,720	45.22
Parti sauverois - Équipe Luc Leblanc	Luc Leblanc	1,651	43.40
Independent	Robert Gravel	397	10.44
Parti libre Saint-Sauveur	Michel Leclerc	36	0.95

== Montérégie ==
=== Acton Vale ===
Mayoral candidate	Vote	%
Éric Charbonneau (X)	Acclaimed	

=== Beauharnois ===
Mayoral candidate	Vote	%
Alain Dubuc	2,450	48.68
Lara Quevillon	1,351	26.84
Bruno Tremblay (X)	684	13.59
Roxanne Poissant	548	10.89

=== Beloeil ===
Party	Mayoral candidate	Vote	%
Oser Beloeil - Équipe Nadine Viau	Nadine Viau	2,743	36.24
Équipe Diane Lavoie - Beloeil gagnant	Diane Lavoie (X)	2,502	33.05
Beloeil, c'est nous!	Luc Cossette	1,667	22.02
Parti des citoyens de Beloeil	Yves Deshaies	324	4.28
Beloeil debout	Réginald Gagnon	292	3.86
Independent	Jean Caumartin	42	0.55

=== Boucherville ===
==== Mayor ====
Party	Mayoral candidate	Vote	%
Équipe Jean Martel - Option Citoyens Citoyennes	Jean Martel (X)	Acclaimed	

==== Boucherville City Council ====
Marie-Victorin District (1)
Party	Council candidate	Vote	%
Équipe Jean Martel - Option Citoyens Citoyennes	Isabelle Bleau (X)	Acclaimed	
Rivière-aux-Pins District (2)
Party	Council candidate	Vote	%
Équipe Jean Martel - Option Citoyens Citoyennes	Raouf Absi (X)	Acclaimed	
Des Découvreurs District (3)
Party	Council candidate	Vote	%
Équipe Jean Martel - Option Citoyens Citoyennes	Josée Bissonnette (X)	Acclaimed	
Harmonie District (4)
Party	Council candidate	Vote	%
Équipe Jean Martel - Option Citoyens Citoyennes	Anne Barabé (X)	Acclaimed	
La Seigneurie District (5)
Party	Council candidate	Vote	%
Équipe Jean Martel - Option Citoyens Citoyennes	François Desmarais (X)	Acclaimed	
Saint-Louis District (6)
Party	Council candidate	Vote	%
Équipe Jean Martel - Option Citoyens Citoyennes	Magalie Queval (X)	Acclaimed	
De Normandie District (7)
Party	Council candidate	Vote	%
Équipe Jean Martel - Option Citoyens Citoyennes	Jacqueline Boubane (X)	Acclaimed	
Le Boisé District (8)
Party	Council candidate	Vote	%
Équipe Jean Martel - Option Citoyens Citoyennes	Lise Roy (X)	Acclaimed	

=== Brossard ===
==== Mayor ====
Party	Mayoral candidate	Vote	%
Brossard Together - Team Doreen Assaad	Doreen Assaad (X)	11,061	62.81
Coalition Brossard	Michel Gervais	4,982	28.20
Brossard uni	Hanadi Saad	1,212	6.86
Independent	Manon Girard	412	2.33

==== Brossard City Council ====
District 1
Party	Council candidate	Vote	%
Brossard Together - Team Doreen Assaad	Christian Gaudette (X)	890	51.45
Independent	Tony Ghannamy	429	24.80
Coalition Brossard	Jin Kim	320	18.50
Brossard uni	Vanessa Fernandez Rodriguez	91	5.26
District 2
Party	Council candidate	Vote	%
Brossard Together - Team Doreen Assaad	Tina DelVecchio	929	49.21
Coalition Brossard	Georgette Saad	595	31.51
Independent	Diane Girard	259	13.72
Brossard uni	Katiuscia Cantaluppi	105	5.56
District 3
Party	Council candidate	Vote	%
Brossard Together - Team Doreen Assaad	Stéphanie Quintal	540	47.04
Coalition Brossard	Monique Gagné (X)	440	38.33
Brossard uni	Dalila Khettou	168	14.63
District 4
Party	Council candidate	Vote	%
Brossard Together - Team Doreen Assaad	Patrick Langlois	1,050	57.79
Coalition Brossard	Stéphane Alain	521	28.67
Brossard uni	Faisal Chowdhury	246	13.54
District 5
Party	Council candidate	Vote	%
Independent	Claudio Benedetti (X)	1,025	47.83
Brossard Together - Team Doreen Assaad	Nick Kaminaris	746	34.81
Coalition Brossard	Zouhair Loubani	236	11.01
Brossard uni	Salam Selman	136	6.35
District 6
Party	Council candidate	Vote	%
Brossard Together - Team Doreen Assaad	Sophie Allard (X)	1,592	69.04
Coalition Brossard	Max Maurice	591	25.63
Brossard uni	Tasneem El Bashtaly	123	5.33
District 7
Party	Council candidate	Vote	%
Brossard Together - Team Doreen Assaad	Antoine Assaf (X)	1,345	76.69
Coalition Brossard	Simra Baig	260	14.81
Brossard uni	Marlon Cambridge	151	8.60
District 8
Party	Council candidate	Vote	%
Coalition Brossard	Xixi Li	883	45.21
Brossard Together - Team Doreen Assaad	Jean-Paul Mouradian	851	43.57
Brossard uni	Sy Levan	134	6.86
Independent	Trang K. Le Tran	85	4.35
District 9
Party	Council candidate	Vote	%
Brossard Together - Team Doreen Assaad	Michelle Hui (X)	751	59.84
Coalition Brossard	Christine Chédid	395	31.47
Independent	Manh Nguyen	109	8.69
District 10
Party	Council candidate	Vote	%
Brossard Together - Team Doreen Assaad	Daniel Lucier	588	35.13
Coalition Brossard	Caroline Kilsdonk	548	32.74
Independent	Sylvie DesGroseilliers (X)	454	27.12
Brossard uni	Michel Roy	84	5.02

=== Candiac ===
Party	Mayoral candidate	Vote	%
Équipe action Candiac	Normand Dyotte (X)	4,376	70.69
Équipe Smith	David Smith	1,814	29.31

=== Carignan ===
Party	Mayoral candidate	Vote	%
Pro-citoyens - Équipe Patrick Marquès	Patrick Marquès (X)	Acclaimed	

=== Chambly ===
Party	Mayoral candidate	Vote	%
Independent	Alexandra Labbé (X)	5,244	71.14
Démocratie Chambly	Julie Daigneault	2,127	28.86

=== Châteauguay ===
==== Mayor ====
Party	Mayoral candidate	Vote	%
Alliance Châteauguay - Éric Allard Team	Éric Allard	6,350	53.47
Citizens' Action - Équipe Nathalie Simon	Nathalie Simon	3,359	28.29
Impact Châteauguay - Équipe Lamoureux	Lucie Lamoureux	2,166	18.24

==== Châteauguay City Council ====
La Noue District (1)
Party	Council candidate	Vote	%
Alliance Châteauguay - Éric Allard Team	Barry Doyle (X)	697	47.06
Impact Châteauguay - Équipe Lamoureux	Marc Lavigne	479	32.34
Citizens' Action - Équipe Nathalie Simon	Nick Minotti	305	20.59
du Filgate District (2)
Party	Council candidate	Vote	%
Alliance Châteauguay - Éric Allard Team	Arlene Bryant	764	59.27
Impact Châteauguay - Équipe Lamoureux	Michel Énault (X)	293	22.73
Citizens' Action - Équipe Nathalie Simon	Patricia Martineau	232	18.00
Robutel District (3)
Party	Council candidate	Vote	%
Alliance Châteauguay - Éric Allard Team	Éric Corbeil (X)	889	68.49
Citizens' Action - Équipe Nathalie Simon	Samuel Quansah	240	18.49
Impact Châteauguay - Équipe Lamoureux	Luc Létourneau	169	13.02
Bumbray District (4)
Party	Council candidate	Vote	%
Alliance Châteauguay - Éric Allard Team	Lucie Laberge (X)	859	59.16
Citizens' Action - Équipe Nathalie Simon	Madeleine Chalmel	370	25.48
Impact Châteauguay - Équipe Lamoureux	Joseph Horvat	223	15.36
Salaberry District (5)
Party	Council candidate	Vote	%
Alliance Châteauguay - Éric Allard Team	Marie-Louise Kerneis	573	47.91
Citizens' Action - Équipe Nathalie Simon	Sandrine Lacoste-Bissonnette	367	30.69
Impact Châteauguay - Équipe Lamoureux	Doreen E. Scalia King	256	21.40
Lang District (6)
Party	Council candidate	Vote	%
Alliance Châteauguay - Éric Allard Team	Mike Gendron (X)	1,170	67.59
Citizens' Action - Équipe Nathalie Simon	Michael McGinn	345	19.93
Impact Châteauguay - Équipe Lamoureux	Asha Callichurn	216	12.48
Le Moyne District (7)
Party	Council candidate	Vote	%
Alliance Châteauguay - Éric Allard Team	Luc Daoust	861	53.78
Citizens' Action - Équipe Nathalie Simon	Yvon Girard	443	27.67
Impact Châteauguay - Équipe Lamoureux	Denis Barbeau	297	18.55
D'Youville District (8)
Party	Council candidate	Vote	%
Independent	François Le Borgne (X)	682	39.49
Alliance Châteauguay - Éric Allard Team	Sylvie Castonguay	494	28.60
Citizens' Action - Équipe Nathalie Simon	Mathieu Durivage	289	16.73
Impact Châteauguay - Équipe Lamoureux	Michel Thibault	262	15.17

=== Contrecoeur ===
Mayoral candidate	Vote	%
Maud Allaire (X)	1,812	68.38
René Laprade	838	31.62

=== Coteau-du-Lac ===
Mayoral candidate	Vote	%
Andrée Brosseau (X)	2,241	78.83
Guy Jasmin	602	21.17

=== Delson ===
Party	Mayoral candidate	Vote	%
Alliance Delson	Christian Ouellette (X)	1,575	85.46
Independent	Jacques J. Trudeau	268	14.54

=== Hudson ===
Mayoral candidate	Vote	%
Chloe Hutchison	1,013	49.44
Helen Kurgansky	682	33.28
Jamie Nicholls (Note: Nicholls is now known as Jae due to gender transition.)	354	17.28

=== La Prairie ===
Party	Mayoral candidate	Vote	%
Place aux citoyens	Frédéric Galantai	3,734	48.99
Équipe Donat Serres	Donat Serres (X)	3,275	42.97
Équipe Barbara Joannette - Ensemble pour les citoyens	Barbara Joannette	613	8.04

=== Les Cèdres ===
Mayoral candidate	Vote	%
Bernard Daoust	1,269	64.71
Raymond Larouche (X)	692	35.29

=== Les Coteaux ===
Mayoral candidate	Vote	%
Sylvain Brazeau	Acclaimed	

=== L'Île-Perrot ===
Mayoral candidate	Vote	%
Pierre Séguin (X)	Acclaimed	

=== Longueuil ===
==== Mayor ====
Party	Mayoral candidate	Vote	%
Coalition Longueuil - Équipe Catherine Fournier	Catherine Fournier	37,121	61.35
Longueuil ensemble - Équipe Josée Latendresse	Josée Latendresse	11,223	18.55
Longueuil citoyen - Équipe Jean-Marc Léveillé	Jean-Marc Léveillé	8,428	11.93
Action Longueuil - Équipe Jacques Létourneau	Jacques Létourneau	3,736	6.17

==== Longueuil City Council ====
Results by district

Fatima-du Parcours-du-Cerf District (1)
Party	Council candidate	Vote	%
Coalition Longueuil - Équipe Catherine Fournier	Marc-Antoine Azouz	2,662	62.44
Longueuil citoyen - Équipe Jean-Marc Léveillé	Marie-Josée Beaulieu	872	20.46
Action Longueuil - Équipe Jacques Létourneau	Carole-Anne Lapierre	384	9.01
Longueuil ensemble - Équipe Josée Latendresse	Lydie Olga Ntap	345	8.09
Boisé-du Tremblay District (2)
Party	Council candidate	Vote	%
Coalition Longueuil - Équipe Catherine Fournier	Lysa Bélaïcha	2,491	52.03
Longueuil citoyen - Équipe Jean-Marc Léveillé	Benoît L'Ecuyer (X)	1,751	36.57
Longueuil ensemble - Équipe Josée Latendresse	Guy Sauvé	420	8.77
Action Longueuil - Équipe Jacques Létourneau	Robert JR Samson	126	2.63
Parc-Michel-Chartrand District (3)
Party	Council candidate	Vote	%
Coalition Longueuil - Équipe Catherine Fournier	Jonathan Tabarah (X)	4,001	77.39
Longueuil ensemble - Équipe Josée Latendresse	Claire Girard	540	10.44
Longueuil citoyen - Équipe Jean-Marc Léveillé	Rima Choghri	445	8.61
Action Longueuil - Équipe Jacques Létourneau	Jordan Simard	184	3.56
Antoinette-Robidoux District (4)
Party	Council candidate	Vote	%
Coalition Longueuil - Équipe Catherine Fournier	Rolande Balma	1,402	60.67
Longueuil citoyen - Équipe Jean-Marc Léveillé	Michel Lanctôt (X)	498	21.55
Longueuil ensemble - Équipe Josée Latendresse	Farid Salem	220	9.52
Action Longueuil - Équipe Jacques Létourneau	Nadia Taillefer	191	8.26
Georges-Dor District (5)
Party	Council candidate	Vote	%
Coalition Longueuil - Équipe Catherine Fournier	Reine Bombo-Allara	2,243	54.76
Longueuil citoyen - Équipe Jean-Marc Léveillé	Xavier Léger (X)	1,245	30.40
Longueuil ensemble - Équipe Josée Latendresse	Alain Riendeau	357	8.72
Action Longueuil - Équipe Jacques Létourneau	Pierre-Antoine Girard	251	6.13
Explorateurs District (6)
Party	Council candidate	Vote	%
Coalition Longueuil - Équipe Catherine Fournier	Karl Ferraro	1,982	58.92
Longueuil citoyen - Équipe Jean-Marc Léveillé	Christian Bassong	539	16.02
Action Longueuil - Équipe Jacques Létourneau	Tommy Théberge (X)	510	15.16
Longueuil ensemble - Équipe Josée Latendresse	Nancy Decelles	333	9.90
Coteau-Rouge District (7)
Party	Council candidate	Vote	%
Coalition Longueuil - Équipe Catherine Fournier	Carl Lévesque	3,145	70.50
Longueuil ensemble - Équipe Josée Latendresse	Cynthia Pothier	529	11.86
Action Longueuil - Équipe Jacques Létourneau	Chantal Parenteau	457	10.24
Longueuil citoyen - Équipe Jean-Marc Léveillé	Rose Marie DeSousa	330	7.40
Saint-Charles District (8)
Party	Council candidate	Vote	%
Coalition Longueuil - Équipe Catherine Fournier	Sylvain Larocque	2,221	53.97
Action Longueuil - Équipe Jacques Létourneau	Eric Bouchard (X)	820	19.93
Longueuil ensemble - Équipe Josée Latendresse	Hélène Bergeron	748	18.18
Longueuil citoyen - Équipe Jean-Marc Léveillé	Nathalie Charbonneau	326	7.92
LeMoyne-de Jacques-Cartier District (9)
Party	Council candidate	Vote	%
Coalition Longueuil - Équipe Catherine Fournier	Marjolaine Mercier	1,802	63.56
Longueuil citoyen - Équipe Jean-Marc Léveillé	Colette Éthier (X)	524	18.48
Longueuil ensemble - Équipe Josée Latendresse	Laurence Laberge	326	11.50
Action Longueuil - Équipe Jacques Létourneau	André Junior Martel	183	6.46
Greenfield Park District (10)
Party	Council candidate	Vote	%
Option Greenfield Park	Sylvain Joly	1,993	48.21
Longueuil citoyen - Équipe Jean-Marc Léveillé	Robert Myles (X)	1.808	43.73
Action Longueuil - Équipe Jacques Létourneau	Caroline Labelle	333	8.06
Laflèche District (11)
Party	Council candidate	Vote	%
Longueuil ensemble - Équipe Josée Latendresse	Jacques Lemire (X)	1,754	51.53
Coalition Longueuil - Équipe Catherine Fournier	José Lemay-Leclerc	1,249	36.69
Longueuil citoyen - Équipe Jean-Marc Léveillé	Angelique Allara	217	6.37
Action Longueuil - Équipe Jacques Létourneau	Gabriela Quiroz	184	5.41
Vieux-Saint-Hubert-de la Savane District (12)
Party	Council candidate	Vote	%
Coalition Longueuil - Équipe Catherine Fournier	Geneviève Héon	2,517	57.04
Longueuil ensemble - Équipe Josée Latendresse	Suzanne Lachance	798	18.08
Longueuil citoyen - Équipe Jean-Marc Léveillé	Claudia Beaudin	610	13.82
Action Longueuil - Équipe Jacques Létourneau	Amélie Gilbert	488	11.06
Parc-de-la-Cité District (13)
Party	Council candidate	Vote	%
Coalition Longueuil - Équipe Catherine Fournier	Affine Lwalalika	2,294	52.28
Longueuil ensemble - Équipe Josée Latendresse	Jacques E. Poitras (X)	1,611	36.71
Longueuil citoyen - Équipe Jean-Marc Léveillé	Enrique Fredes	256	5.83
Action Longueuil - Équipe Jacques Létourneau	Hélène Côté	227	5.17
Iberville District (14)
Party	Council candidate	Vote	%
Coalition Longueuil - Équipe Catherine Fournier	Alvaro Cueto	2,827	68.72
Longueuil ensemble - Équipe Josée Latendresse	Yves Mbattang	582	14.15
Longueuil citoyen - Équipe Jean-Marc Léveillé	Stéphane Desjardins	442	10.74
Action Longueuil - Équipe Jacques Létourneau	Guillaume Lemay-Therrien	232	5.64
Independent	Roxanne Melissa Guerra-Lacasse	31	0.75
Maraîchers District (15)
Party	Council candidate	Vote	%
Coalition Longueuil - Équipe Catherine Fournier	Nathalie Delisle	2,524	57.07
Longueuil ensemble - Équipe Josée Latendresse	Jean-François Boivin (X)	1,250	28.26
Longueuil citoyen - Équipe Jean-Marc Léveillé	William Sauve	452	10.22
Action Longueuil - Équipe Jacques Létourneau	Pierre Cayer	197	4.45

=== Marieville ===
Mayoral candidate	Vote	%
Caroline Gagnon (X)	Acclaimed	

==== By-election ====
A mayoral by-election was held October 29, 2023, following the resignation of Caroline Gagnon who took a teaching position in England. The results of the by-election were as follows:

Mayoral candidate	Vote	%
Vincent Després	1,252	71.58
Gilbert Lefort	497	28.42

=== McMasterville ===
Mayoral candidate	Vote	%
Martin Dulac (X)	Acclaimed	

=== Mercier ===
Party	Mayoral candidate	Vote	%
Parti Avenir Mercier	Lise Michaud (X)	Acclaimed	

=== Mont-Saint-Hilaire ===
Party	Mayoral candidate	Vote	%
Transition MSH	Marc-André Guertin	3,733	52.45
Mouvement citoyen - Équipe Carole Blouin	Carole Blouin	2,271	31.91
Avenir hilairemontais - Équipe Yves Corriveau	Yves Corriveau (X)	879	12.35
Independent	François Perrier	156	2.19
Independent	Ferdinand Berner	78	1.10

=== Notre-Dame-de-l'Île-Perrot ===
Party	Mayoral candidate	Vote	%
Option citoyens	Danie Deschênes (X)	Acclaimed	

=== Otterburn Park ===
Mayoral candidate	Vote	%
Mélanie Villeneuve	1,849	78.71
Denis Parent (X)	500	21.29

=== Pincourt ===
Mayoral candidate	Vote	%
Claude Comeau	1,641	53.28
Yvan Cardinal (X)	1,439	46.72

=== Richelieu ===
Mayoral candidate	Vote	%
Claude Gauthier	Acclaimed	

=== Rigaud ===
Mayoral candidate	Vote	%
Marie-Claude Frigault	1,385	64.54
Edith de Haerne	696	32.43
Guy Turcotte	65	3.03

=== Saint-Amable ===
Party	Mayoral candidate	Vote	%
Vision équipe Stephane Williams	Stéphane Williams (X)	Acclaimed	

=== Saint-Basile-le-Grand ===
Party	Mayoral candidate	Vote	%
Independent	Yves Lessard (X)	2,269	52.15
Parti grandbasilois	Maurice Cantin	2,082	47.85

=== Saint-Bruno-de-Montarville ===
Party	Mayoral candidate	Vote	%
Citoyens d'abord Saint-Bruno - Équipe Grisé	Ludovic Grisé Farand	5,492	55.05
Ensemble Saint-Bruno	Isabelle Bérubé	4,036	40.46
Parti équilibre	André Besner	448	4.49

=== Saint-Césaire ===
Mayoral candidate	Vote	%
Guy Benjamin (X)	Acclaimed	

==== By-election ====
A mayoral by-election was intended to happen May 5, 2024. Luc Forand was elected by acclamation.

Mayoral candidate	Vote	%
Luc Forand	Acclaimed	

=== Saint-Constant ===
Party	Mayoral candidate	Vote	%
Équipe Jean-Claude Boyer	Jean-Claude Boyer (X)	Acclaimed	

=== Sainte-Catherine ===
Party	Mayoral candidate	Vote	%
Parti de l'Équipe Bates	Jocelyne Bates (X)	1,960	46.38
Action Sainte-Catherine - Équipe Denis Huet	Denis Huet	1,270	30.05
Ensemble Sainte-Catherine - Équipe Carline Louis-Charles	Carline Louis-Charles	996	23.57

=== Sainte-Julie ===
Party	Mayoral candidate	Vote	%
La voix des citoyens - Équipe Mario Lemay	Mario Lemay	6,516	82.17
Parti de Sainte-Julie	Christian Komze	1,414	17.83

=== Sainte-Martine ===
Mayoral candidate	Vote	%
Mélanie Lefort	Acclaimed	

=== Saint-Hyacinthe ===
==== Mayor ====
Party	Mayoral candidate	Vote	%
Independent	André Beauregard	7,300	50.82
Saint-Hyacinthe unie	Marijo Demers	7,065	49.18

==== Saint-Hyacinthe City Council ====
Party	Council candidate	Vote	%
Sainte-Rosalie District (1)
Independent	Donald Côté (X)	722	54.99
Saint-Hyacinthe unie	Hernan Restrepo	591	45.01
Yamaska District (2)
Independent	Pierre Thériault (X)	852	53.92
Saint-Hyacinthe unie	Alexandre Tardif	728	46.08
Saint-Joseph District (3)
Independent	Mélanie Bédard	788	57.10
Saint-Hyacinthe unie	Carl Vaillancourt	592	42.90
La Providence District (4)
Independent	Bernard Barré (X)	977	63.24
Saint-Hyacinthe unie	Julie Marcotte	568	36.76
Douville District (5)
Independent	David-Olivier Huard	831	45.39
Saint-Hyacinthe unie	Odile Alain	746	40.74
Independent	Richard Maranda	254	13.87
Saint-Thomas-d'Aquin District (6)
Independent	Guylain Coulombe	717	50.56
Saint-Hyacinthe unie	Mathieu Désy	613	43.23
Independent	Donald Poirier	88	6.21
Saint-Sacrement District (7)
Independent	Annie Pelletier (X)	492	52.06
Saint-Hyacinthe unie	Marc Bisaillon	453	47.94
Bois-Joli District (8)
Independent	Claire Gagné (X)	637	48.55
Saint-Hyacinthe unie	Anne-Marie Saint-Germain	439	33.46
Independent	Daniel Malenfant	236	17.99
Sacré-Coeur District (9)
Independent	David Bousquet (X)	697	66.95
Saint-Hyacinthe unie	Jausée Carrier	344	33.05
Cascades District (10)
Independent	Jeannot Caron (X)	395	54.94
Saint-Hyacinthe unie	Chantal Goulet	213	29.62
Independent	Richard Mongrain	111	15.44
Hertel-Notre-Dame District (11)
Independent	André Arpin	668	52.11
Saint-Hyacinthe unie	Annabelle T. Palardy	614	47.89

=== Saint-Jean-sur-Richelieu ===
==== Mayor ====
Party	Mayoral candidate	Vote	%
Équipe Andrée Bouchard	Andrée Bouchard	19,023	65.18
Équipe Alain Laplante	Alain Laplante (X)	10,162	34.82

==== Saint-Jean-sur-Richelieu City Council ====
District 1
Party	Council candidate	Vote	%
Équipe Andrée Bouchard	Mélanie Dufresne (X)	1,334	76.36
Équipe Alain Laplante	Jean-Guy Trudeau	413	23.64
District 2
Party	Council candidate	Vote	%
Équipe Andrée Bouchard	Marianne Lambert	1,438	53.84
Équipe Alain Laplante	Justin Bessette (X)	1,233	46.16
District 3
Party	Council candidate	Vote	%
Équipe Andrée Bouchard	Jérémie Meunier	1,209	45.43
Independent	Michel Gendron (X)	807	30.33
Équipe Alain Laplante	Louise Lemieux	645	24.24
District 4
Party	Council candidate	Vote	%
Équipe Andrée Bouchard	Jean Fontaine (X)	1,865	71.48
Équipe Alain Laplante	Patrick Beausoleil	744	28.52
District 5
Party	Council candidate	Vote	%
Équipe Andrée Bouchard	Sébastien Gaudette	1,017	58.52
Équipe Alain Laplante	Raymond Boucher	512	29.46
Independent	James Alexander Falls	209	12.03
District 6
Party	Council candidate	Vote	%
Independent	Patricia Poissant (X)	980	45.52
Équipe Alain Laplante	Pierre Boudreau	691	29.98
Équipe Andrée Bouchard	Guy Desrochers	634	27.51
District 7
Party	Council candidate	Vote	%
Équipe Andrée Bouchard	Annie Surprenant	1,291	58.15
Équipe Alain Laplante	Julie Messier	929	41.85
District 8
Party	Council candidate	Vote	%
Équipe Andrée Bouchard	Marco Savard (X)	1,487	52.30
Équipe Alain Laplante	Marie Tremblay	1,356	47.40
District 9
Party	Council candidate	Vote	%
Équipe Andrée Bouchard	Lyne Poitras	1,023	47.08
Independent	Daniel Hacherel	579	26.65
Équipe Alain Laplante	Myriam Dubois	571	26.28
District 10
Party	Council candidate	Vote	%
Équipe Andrée Bouchard	François Roy	1,463	50.38
Équipe Alain Laplante	Ian Langlois (X)	1,441	49.62
District 11
Party	Council candidate	Vote	%
Équipe Andrée Bouchard	Claire Charbonneau (X)	1,489	66.09
Équipe Alain Laplante	Stéphane Bergeron	764	33.91
District 12
Party	Council candidate	Vote	%
Équipe Andrée Bouchard	Jessica Racine-Lehoux	1,683	50.69
Équipe Alain Laplante	Maryline Charbonneau (X)	1,637	49.31

=== Saint-Lambert ===
Party	Mayoral candidate	Vote	%
Independent	Pascale Mongrain	2,926	42.33
Vision Saint-Lambert - Équipe Karl Villeneuve	Karl Villeneuve	1,865	26.98
Independent	France Désaulniers	1,233	17.84
Independent	Vincent Trudel	889	12.86

=== Saint-Lazare ===
Mayoral candidate	Vote	%
Geneviève Lachance	Acclaimed	

=== Saint-Philippe ===
Party	Mayoral candidate	Vote	%
Alliance avenir Saint-Philippe - Équipe Christian Marin	Christian Marin	1,090	50.23
Independent	Johanne Beaulac (X)	955	44.01
Mouvement oser Saint-Philippe - Équipe Alexandre Poirier	Alexandre Poirier	125	5.76

=== Saint-Pie ===
Mayoral candidate	Vote	%
Mario St-Pierre (X)	Acclaimed	

=== Saint-Rémi ===
Mayoral candidate	Vote	%
Sylvie Gagnon-Breton (X)	Acclaimed	

=== Saint-Zotique ===
Mayoral candidate	Vote	%
Yvon Chiasson (X)	1,516	53.04
Michel Parent	1,029	36.00
Robin Leroux	313	10.95

=== Salaberry-de-Valleyfield ===
==== Mayor ====
Mayoral candidate	Vote	%
Miguel Lemieux (X)	Acclaimed	

==== Salaberry-de-Valleyfield City Council ====
Candidate	Vote	%
District 1
Lyne Lefebvre (X)	Acclaimed	
District 2
Jean-Marc Rochon (X)	743	82.37
Pierre Spénard	159	17.63
District 3
France Chenail (X)	903	71.33
Robert Savard	363	28.67
District 4
Stéphane Leduc	451	38.48
Sylvain Renaud	349	29.78
Martin Lacroix	212	18.09
Alain Daigle	160	13.65
District 5
Normand Amesse (X)	977	81.01
Normand Bourget	229	18.99
District 6
Patrick Rancourt (X)	Acclaimed	
District 7
Jean-François Giroux	Acclaimed	
District 8
Sophie Sirois-Perras	1,133	63.80
François Labossière	643	36.20

=== Sorel-Tracy ===
Mayoral candidate	Vote	%
Serge Péloquin (X)	8,406	74.53
Jocelyn Daneau	2,873	25.47

==== By-election ====
A mayoral by-election was held November 20, 2022, following the dismissal of Serge Péloquin as mayor due to a court order after it was discovered that Péloquin had hidden a recording device in the city clerk's office. The results of the by-election were as follows:

Mayoral candidate	Vote	%
Patrick Péloquin	5,425	51.94
Jean Cournoyer	3,788	36.27
Corina Bastiani	1,231	11.79

=== Varennes ===
Party	Mayoral candidate	Vote	%
Parti durable - Équipe Damphousse	Martin Damphousse (X)	Acclaimed	

=== Vaudreuil-Dorion ===
==== Mayor ====
Party	Mayoral candidate	Vote	%
Parti de l'Action de Vaudreuil-Dorion	Guy Pilon (X)	Acclaimed	

==== Vaudreuil-Dorion City Council ====
Quinchien District (1)
Party	Council candidate	Vote	%
Parti de l'Action de Vaudreuil-Dorion	Luc Marsan	Acclaimed	
Valois District (2)
Party	Council candidate	Vote	%
Parti de l'Action de Vaudreuil-Dorion	François Séguin (X)	Acclaimed	
Independent	Marie Camita Célestin	Withdrew	
Des Bâtisseurs District (3)
Party	Council candidate	Vote	%
Parti de l'Action de Vaudreuil-Dorion	Jasmine Sharma (X)	Acclaimed	
De la Seigneurie District (4)
Party	Council candidate	Vote	%
Parti de l'Action de Vaudreuil-Dorion	Karine Lechasseur	Acclaimed	
Des Chenaux District (5)
Party	Council candidate	Vote	%
Parti de l'Action de Vaudreuil-Dorion	Diane Morin (X)	Acclaimed	
Saint-Michel District (6)
Party	Council candidate	Vote	%
Parti de l'Action de Vaudreuil-Dorion	Gabriel Parent (X)	360	50.42
Independent	Denis Lecompte	354	49.58
Desrochers District (7)
Party	Council candidate	Vote	%
Parti de l'Action de Vaudreuil-Dorion	Paul M. Normand (X)	Acclaimed	
De la Baie District (8)
Party	Council candidate	Vote	%
Parti de l'Action de Vaudreuil-Dorion	Paul Dumoulin (X)	Acclaimed	

=== Verchères ===
Mayoral candidate	Vote	%
Alexandre Bélisle (X)	Acclaimed	

== Centre-du-Québec ==
=== Bécancour ===
Mayoral candidate	Vote	%
Lucie Allard	2,040	40.12
Karl Grondin	1,993	39.19
Denis Vouligny	999	19.65
Blak D. Blackburn	53	1.04

=== Drummondville ===
==== Mayor ====
Mayoral candidate	Vote	%
Stéphanie Lacoste	13,317	64.95
Alain Carrier (X)	6,994	34.11
Othmen Bouattour	192	0.94

==== Drummondville City Council ====
Candidate	Vote	%
District 1
Marc-André Lemire	862	51.59
André Béliveau	809	48.41
District 2
Alexandre Desbiens	1,183	60.85
Jean Charest (X)	671	34.52
Emmanuel Beaulac	90	4.63
District 3
Catherine Lassonde (X)	986	70.33
Sonia Jam	416	29.67
District 4
Carole Léger	555	45.45
Alain D'Auteuil (X)	462	37.84
Anthony Labonté	163	13.35
François Guernon	41	3.36
District 5
Sarah Saint-Cyr Lanoie	1,216	61.07
Louis Raiche	775	38.93
District 6
Jean-Philippe Tessier	1,176	59.10
Beatriz Acosta	814	40.90
District 7
Isabelle Duchesne	687	57.93
Julie Bourassa	499	42.07
District 8
Yves Grondin (X)	1,208	70.36
Dominique Lemaire		
District 9
Julie Létourneau	1,458	73.71
Guy Nobert	520	26.29
District 10
Mario Sévigny	Acclaimed	
Thierry Deruelle	Withdrew	
District 11
Daniel Pelletier (X)	853	51.05
Bryan Arseneault	818	48.95
District 12
Cathy Bernier (X)	1,895	84.56
Serge Beaulieu	346	15.44

=== Nicolet ===
Mayoral candidate	Vote	%
Geneviève Dubois (X)	Acclaimed	

=== Plessisville ===
Mayoral candidate	Vote	%
Pierre Fortier	1,664	66.53
Luc Dastous	644	25.75
Yanick Lapierre	193	7.72

=== Princeville ===
Mayoral candidate	Vote	%
Gilles Fortier (X)	Acclaimed	

=== Victoriaville ===
==== Mayor ====
Mayoral candidate	Vote	%
Antoine Tardif	Acclaimed	

==== Victoriaville City Council ====
Candidate	Vote	%
du Parc-de-L'Amitié District (1)
Caroline Pilon (X)	Acclaimed	
du Parc-de-L'Île District (2)
Benoit Gauthier (X)	Acclaimed	
Charles-Édouard-Mailhot District (3)
Patrick Paulin (X)	617	91.14
Réal Rivard	60	8.86
Sainte-Famille District (4)
Alexandre Côté (X)	Acclaimed	
du Parc-Terre-des-Jeunes District (5)
Yanick Poisson (X)	Acclaimed	
du Parc-Victoria District (6)
Marc Morin (X)	Acclaimed	
Sainte-Victoire District (7)
Yannick Fréchette (X)	Acclaimed	
Arthabaska-Nord District (8)
Chantal Moreau (X)	519	55.15
Lauréanne Richer	422	44.85
Arthabaska-Ouest District (9)
Michael Provencher (X)	Acclaimed	
Arthabaska-Est District (10)
James Casey	563	60.28
Stéphanie Turcotte	371	39.72

== Prefectural (warden) elections ==
=== Kamouraska ===
Prefectural candidate	Vote	%
Sylvain Roy	2,428	59.29
Louis-Martin Hénault	1,667	40.71

=== La Haute-Gaspésie ===
Prefectural candidate	Vote	%
Guy Bernatchez	1,855	47.67
Allen Cormier (X)	1,501	38.58
Jacques Mimeault	411	10.56
Maxime Esther Bouchard	124	3.19

=== La Matapédia ===
Prefectural candidate	Vote	%
Chantale Lavoie (X)	Acclaimed	

=== La Vallée-de-la-Gatineau ===
Prefectural candidate	Vote	%
Chantal Lamarche (X)	5,341	84.90
Lynne Gagnon	950	15.10

=== Le Domaine-du-Roy ===
Prefectural candidate	Vote	%
Yanick Baillargeon	5,919	58.90
Bernard Généreux	4,131	41.10

=== Le Granit ===
Prefectural candidate	Vote	%
Monique Pherivong Lenoir	3,080	56.80
Yves D'Anjou	2,343	43.20

=== Le Haut-Saint-François ===
Prefectural candidate	Vote	%
Robert G. Roy (X)	3,569	69.37
Marc Turcotte	1,576	30.63

=== Le Rocher-Percé ===
Prefectural candidate	Vote	%
Samuel Parisé	2,576	35.01
Mario Grenier	2,004	27.24
Maurice Anglehart	1,503	20.43
Luc Legresley	1,274	17.32

=== Les Basques ===
Prefectural candidate	Vote	%
Bertin Denis (X)	Acclaimed	

=== Les Collines-de-l'Outaouais ===
Prefectural candidate	Vote	%
Marc Carriere	6,128	40.06
Caryl Green	5,293	34.60
Eric Antoine	3,877	25.34

=== Les Pays-d'en-Haut ===
Prefectural candidate	Vote	%
André Genest (X)	5,658	38.95
Martin Nadon	4,742	32.64
Marie-Eve Ouellette	4,127	28.41

=== Manicouagan ===
Prefectural candidate	Vote	%
Marcel Furlong (X)	4,640	75.80
Cyrille Boucher	1,424	24.20

=== Maria-Chapdelaine ===
Prefectural candidate	Vote	%
Luc Simard (X)	Acclaimed	

=== Minganie ===
Prefectural candidate	Vote	%
Luc Noël (X)	Acclaimed	

==== By-election ====
A by-election was held for prefect on June 11, 2023 following the resignation of Luc Noël. The results were as follows:

Prefectural candidate	Vote	%
Meggie Richard	1,818	91.91
Francis Malec	160	8.09

=== Montcalm ===
Prefectural candidate	Vote	%
Patrick Massé	6,994	52.98
Yannick Thibeault	6,207	47.02

=== Pontiac ===
Prefectural candidate	Vote	%
Jane Toller (X)	3,301	52.69
Michael McCrank	2,964	47.31

=== Témiscamingue ===
Prefectural candidate	Vote	%
Claire Bolduc (X)	3,388	90.01
Renald Baril	376	9.99

=== Témiscouata ===
Prefectural candidate	Vote	%
Serge Pelletier	4,487	53.13
Gaétan Ouellet	3,958	46.87

== See also ==
- Municipal elections in Canada
- Electronic voting in Canada
- 2005 Quebec municipal elections
- 2006 Quebec municipal elections
- 2009 Quebec municipal elections
- 2013 Quebec municipal elections
- 2017 Quebec municipal elections
