= Virginie Dufour =

Canadian politician

Virginie Dufour MNA

Member of the National Assembly of Quebec for Mille-Îles
- Incumbent
- Assumed office October 3, 2022
- Preceded by: Francine Charbonneau
- Constituency: Mille-Îles

Member of the Laval City Council for Sainte-Rose District (21)
- In office November 3, 2013 – November 6, 2021
- Preceded by: Denis Robillard
- Succeeded by: Flavia Alexandra Novac

Personal details
- Born: 1977 (age 48–49) Montreal, Quebec, Canada
- Party: Quebec Liberal Party
- Education: UQAM; Université de Montréal; Université Laval
- Profession: Administrator

Virginie Dufour is a Canadian politician, who was elected to the National Assembly of Quebec in the 2022 Quebec general election. She represents the riding of Mille-Îles as a member of the Quebec Liberal Party. She was re-elected in the 2026 Quebec general election, securing a second consecutive term in the National Assembly.

== Political career ==
=== Municipal politics ===
Dufour ran for a council seat in the district of Sainte-Rose in the 2013 Laval municipal election. She unseated incumbent councillor Denis Robillard. She won re-election in the 2017 election. In early 2021 then mayor Marc Demers announced he would not be running for mayor in the upcoming election, she then announced in April 2021 her intention to run for leadership of Mouvement Lavallois. However, six days later she renounced her candidacy. On May 25, 2021 Durfour announced she would not run again in 2021 and serve until the end of her term. She served on the Laval City Council for 8 years.

=== Provincial politics ===
Dufour ran in the 2022 Quebec election in the riding of Mille-Îles in eastern Laval. While traditionally a Liberal stronghold, it narrowed significantly in the 2018 election. Dufour narrowly won the riding by 1.37% over the CAQ's Julie Séide. She along with Sona Lakhoyan Olivier of Chomedey are the only two Liberal MNA's from Laval.

As of September 7, 2024, she serves as the opposition critic for Housing, Environment and the Fight Against Climate Change, Wildlife and Parks, and Laval.

During the 43rd legislature, she has managed to get 4 bills passed into law.

She was re-elected on October 5, 2026, in the provincial election, receiving 44.3% of the vote and securing a 7,408-vote lead over Parti Québécois candidate Mathieu Trottier-Kavanagh. Following her re-election, she was appointed Official Opposition Critic for the Environment, the Fight Against Climate Change, Biodiversity Conservation, and the Laurentides region.

== Electoral record ==
=== Provincial ===
2026 Quebec general election: Mille-Îles
Party	Candidate	Votes	%	±%
Liberal	Virginie Dufour	14,512	44.32	
Parti Québécois	Mathieu Trottier-Kavanagh	7,104	21.69	
Conservative	Nare Stepanyan	4,139	12.64	
Québec solidaire	Zachary Robert	3,768	11.51	
Coalition Avenir Québec	Sonia Amedome	3,111	9.50	
Osons Québec	Ludovic Mbany	112	0.34	
Total valid votes				
Total rejected ballots				
Turnout			66.33	
Electors on the lists			–	–
Source: Élections Québec

2022 Quebec general election
Party	Candidate	Votes	%	±%
Liberal	Virginie Dufour	9,522	32.38	-3.44
Coalition Avenir Québec	Julie Séide	9,097	30,93	-0.74
Québec solidaire	Guillaume Lajoie	3,789	12.88	+0.11
Parti Québécois	Michel Lachance	3,551	12.07	-3.00
Conservative	Ange Claude Bigilimana	3,105	10.56	+10.56
Green	Bianca Jitaru	346	1.18	-1.65
Total valid votes		29,410	98.78	–
Total rejected ballots		3.63	1.22	–
Turnout		29,773	66.98	+0.51
Electors on the lists		44,453	–	–
Liberal hold		Swing		-1.35

=== Municipal ===
2017 municipal elections in Laval

District 21—Sainte-Rose
Candidates	Parties	Votes	%
Virginie Dufour (incumbent)	Mouvement Lavallois	3,431	50.81
Andréanne Fiola	Parti Laval	1,907	28.24
Marie-Louise Beauchamp	Action Laval	728	10.78
Hassan Khoder	Avenir Laval	687	10.17
Total		6,753	100%

2013 municipal elections in Laval

District 21—Sainte-Rose
Candidates	Parties	Votes	%
Virginie Dufour	Mouvement Lavallois	2,919	41.87
Denis Robillard (Incumbent)	Independent	1,797	25.77
Jean-Paul Melko	Action Laval	786	11.27
Denis Chartier	Parti au service du citoyen	533	7.64
Richard Viau	Option Laval	424	6.08
Anne-Marie Tougas	Independent	375	5.38
Daniel Bombardier	Nouveau Parti des Lavallois	138	1.98
Total		6,972	100
