= Laval City Council =

Laval City Council _{Conseil municipal de Laval (French)}
- City council

Type
- Type: Unicameral

Leadership
- Mayor: Stéphane Boyer, Mouvement lavallois

Structure
- Seats: 22 councillors and mayor
- Political groups: 3
- Mouvement lavallois: 18 / 23
- Action Laval: 2 / 23
- Parti Laval: 2 / 23
- Independent: 1 / 23

Elections
- Voting system: first past the post
- Last election: November 2, 2025

Meeting place
- Laval City Hall

Laval City Council is the governing body in the mayor–council government in the city of Laval, Quebec, Canada. It is composed of the mayor and 21 councillors. They are elected to four year terms with the next election scheduled for November 2025. Statutory meetings are held on the first Monday of each month.

As of the municipal election, Mouvement Lavallois has a majority on the city council and the mayor's office. Two other parties are represented on council Action Laval at 5 seats and Parti Laval at 2 seats.

== Sectors ==
Currently the city is divided into six sectors (secteurs in French) which only approximately cover the territories of the former municipalities. They are:

Sector 1

- Duvernay
- Saint François
- Saint Vincent de Paul

Sector 2

- Laval des Rapides
- Pont Viau
- Renaud

Sector 3

- Chomedey

Sector 4

- Fabreville Ouest
- Îles Laval
- Laval Ouest
- Laval sur le Lac
- Sainte Dorothée

Sector 5

- Fabreville Est
- Sainte Rose

Sector 6

- Vimont
- Auteuil

The former city of Fabreville was divided among two sectors.

== Members ==
=== 2025–present ===
Councillor	Party	Ward	Notes
Stéphane Boyer	Mouvement lavallois	Mayor	
Isabelle Piché	Action Laval	District 1 (Saint-François)	
Annick Senghor	Mouvement lavallois	District 2 (Saint-Vincent-de-Paul)	
Anick Brunet	Mouvement lavallois	District 3 (Duverynay)	
Christine Poirier	Mouvement lavallois	District 4 (Pont Viau)	
Cecilia Macedo	Mouvement lavallois	District 5 (Marigot)	
Martin Fiola	Mouvement lavallois	District 6 (Laval-des-Rapides)	
Seta Topouzian	Mouvement lavallois	District 7 (Renaud-Coursol)	
Pierre Brabant	Mouvement lavallois	District 8 (Vimont)	
David De Cotis	Action Laval	District 9 (Saint-Bruno)	
Jocelyne Sylvain	Mouvement lavallois	District 10 (Auteuil)	
Mohamed Bâ	Mouvement lavallois	District 11 (Le Carrefour)	
Sandra El-Helou	Mouvement lavallois	District 12 (Souvenir-Labelle)	
Vasilios Karidogiannis	Mouvement lavallois	District 13 (Abord-à-Plouffe)	
Aglaia Revelakis	Independent	District 14 (Chomedey)	
Aline Dib	Mouvement lavallois	District 15 (Saint-Martin)	
Ray Khalil	Mouvement lavallois	District 16 (Sainte-Dorothée)	
Nicholas Borne	Mouvement lavallois	District 17 (Laval-les-Îles)	
Yannick Langlois	Mouvement lavallois	District 18 (Orée-des-bois)	
Louise Lortie	Parti Laval	District 19 (Marc-Aurèle-Fortin)	
Carole St-Denis	Mouvement lavallois	District 20 (Champfleury)	
Flavia Alexandra Novac	Mouvement lavallois	District 21 (Sainte-Rose)	
Martin Vaillancourt	Parti Laval	District 22 (Fabreville-Sud)	

=== 2021–2025 ===
Councillor	Party	Ward	Notes
Stéphane Boyer	Mouvement lavallois	Mayor	
Isabelle Piché	Action Laval	District 1 (Saint-François)	
Paolo Galati	Independent	District 2 (Saint Vincent de Paul)	Member of Action Laval until September 19, 2024 when he resigned from the party due to allegations of improper use of public funds.
Achille Cifelli	Action Laval	District 3 (Val des Arbres)	
Christine Poirier	Mouvement lavallois	District 4 (Duvernay-Pont Viau)	
Cecilia Macedo	Mouvement lavallois	District 5 (Marigot)	
Sandra Desmeules	Mouvement lavallois	District 6 (Concorde-Bois-de-Boulogne)	
Seta Topouzian	Mouvement lavallois	District 7 (Renaud)	
Pierre Brabant	Mouvement lavallois	District 8 (Vimont)	
David De Cotis	Action Laval	District 9 (Saint Bruno)	
Jocelyne Frédéric-Gauthier	Mouvement lavallois	District 10 (Auteuil)	
Alexandre Warnet	Mouvement lavallois	District 11 (Laval des Rapides)	
Sandra El Helou	Mouvement lavallois	District 12 (Souvenir Labelle)	
Vasilios Karidogiannis	Mouvement lavallois	District 13 (Abord à Plouffe)	
Aglaia Revelakis	Action Laval	District 14 (Chomedey)	
Aline Dib	Mouvement lavallois	District 15 (Saint Martin)	
Ray Khalil	Mouvement lavallois	District 16 (Sainte Dorothée)	
Nicholas Borne	Mouvement lavallois	District 17 (Laval les Îles)	
Yannick Langlois	Mouvement lavallois	District 18 (Orée des bois)	
Louise Lortie	Parti Laval	District 19 (Marc Aurèle Fortin)	
Claude Larochelle	Parti Laval	District 20 (Fabreville)	
Flavia Alexandra Novac	Mouvement lavallois	District 21 (Sainte-Rose)	

=== 2017–2021 ===
Following the November 5, 2017 municipal election, the following city councillors and mayor were elected:

Councillor	Party	Ward	Notes
Marc Demers	Mouvement lavallois	Mayor	
Eric Morasse	Mouvement lavallois	District 1 (Saint François)	
Paolo Galati	Action Laval	District 2 (Saint Vincent de Paul)	Elected for Mouvement lavallois
Christiane Yoakim	Mouvement lavallois	District 3 (Val des Arbres)	
Stéphane Boyer	Mouvement lavallois	District 4 (Duvernay-Pont Viau)	
Daniel Hébert	Action Laval	District 5 (Marigot)	Elected for Mouvement lavallois
Sandra Desmeules	Mouvement lavallois	District 6 (Concorde-Bois-de-Boulogne)	
Aram Elagoz	Mouvement lavallois	District 7 (Renaud)	
Michel Poissant	Action Laval	District 8 (Vimont)	Elected for Mouvement lavallois
David De Cotis	Action Laval	District 9 (Saint Bruno)	Elected for Mouvement lavallois
Jocelyne Frédéric-Gauthier	Mouvement lavallois	District 10 (Auteuil)	
Isabella Tassoni	Action Laval	District 11 (Laval des Rapides)	Elected for Mouvement lavallois
Sandra El Helou	Mouvement lavallois	District 12 (Souvenir Labelle)	
Vasilios Karidogiannis	Mouvement lavallois	District 13 (Abord à Plouffe)	
Aglaia Revelakis	Action Laval	District 14 (Chomedey)	
Aline Dib	Mouvement lavallois	District 15 (Saint Martin)	
Ray Khalil	Mouvement lavallois	District 16 (Sainte Dorothée)	
Nicholas Borne	Mouvement lavallois	District 17 (Laval les Îles)	
Yannick Langlois	Mouvement lavallois	District 18 (Orée des bois)	
Gilbert Dumas	Mouvement lavallois	District 19 (Marc Aurèle Fortin)	Died on August 20, 2019
Michel Trottier	Parti Laval	District 19 (Marc Aurèle Fortin)	Elected in a by-election November 24, 2019
Claude Larochelle	Parti Laval	District 20 (Fabreville)	
Virginie Dufour	Mouvement lavallois	District 21 (Sainte Rose)	

=== 2013–2017 ===
Following the November 3rd 2013 elections, the following city councillors were elected:

Councillor	Party	Ward	Notes
Marc Demers	Mouvement lavallois	Mayor	
Jacques St-Jean	Independent	District 1 (Saint François)	
Paolo Galati	Mouvement lavallois	District 2 (Saint Vincent de Paul)	
Christiane Yoakim	Mouvement lavallois	District 3 (Val des Arbres)	
Stéphane Boyer	Mouvement lavallois	District 4 (Duvernay-Pont Viau)	
Daniel Hébert	Mouvement lavallois	District 5 (Marigot)	
Sandra Desmeules	Mouvement lavallois	District 6 (Concorde-Bois-de-Boulogne)	
Raynald Adams	Mouvement lavallois	District 7 (Renaud)	
Michel Poissant	Mouvement lavallois	District 8 (Vimont)	
David De Cotis	Mouvement lavallois	District 9 (Saint Bruno)	
Jocelyne Frédéric-Gauthier	Mouvement lavallois	District 10 (Auteuil)	
Pierre Anthian	Independent	District 11 (Laval des Rapides)	
Jean Coupal	Independent	District 12 (Souvenir Labelle)	
Vasilios Karidogiannis	Mouvement lavallois	District 13 (Abord à Plouffe)	
Aglaia Revelakis	Action Laval	District 14 (Chomedey)	
Aline Dib	Mouvement lavallois	District 15 (Saint Martin)	
Ray Khalil	Mouvement lavallois	District 16 (Sainte Dorothée)	
Nicholas Borne	Mouvement lavallois	District 17 (Laval les Îles)	
Alain Lecompte	Independent	District 18 (Orée des bois)	
Gilbert Dumas	Mouvement lavallois	District 19 (Marc Aurèle Fortin)	
Michel Trottier	Independent	District 20 (Fabreville)	
Virginie Dufour	Mouvement lavallois	District 21 (Sainte Rose)	

Prior to the 2013 elections, all 21 councillors has been associated with the Parti PRO des Lavallois, the municipal political party of mayor Gilles Vaillancourt. Following Vaillancourt's resignation as mayor on November 9, 2012, the councillors voted to dissolve the party on November 19, 2012, and sat as independents.

Following Vaillancourt's resignation, councillor Basile Angelopoulos served as the city's acting mayor until council selected Alexandre Duplessis, the former councillor for District 15 (Saint-Martin), as the new mayor on November 23. Angelopoulos again undertook the responsibilities of pro-mayor upon Duplessis' resignation on June 28, 2013, until Martine Beaugrand, the former councillor for District 20 (Fabreville) was acclaimed as the city's new mayor on July 3, 2013.
