= Stéphane Boyer =

Canadian politician (born c. 1988)

His Worship Stéphane Boyer
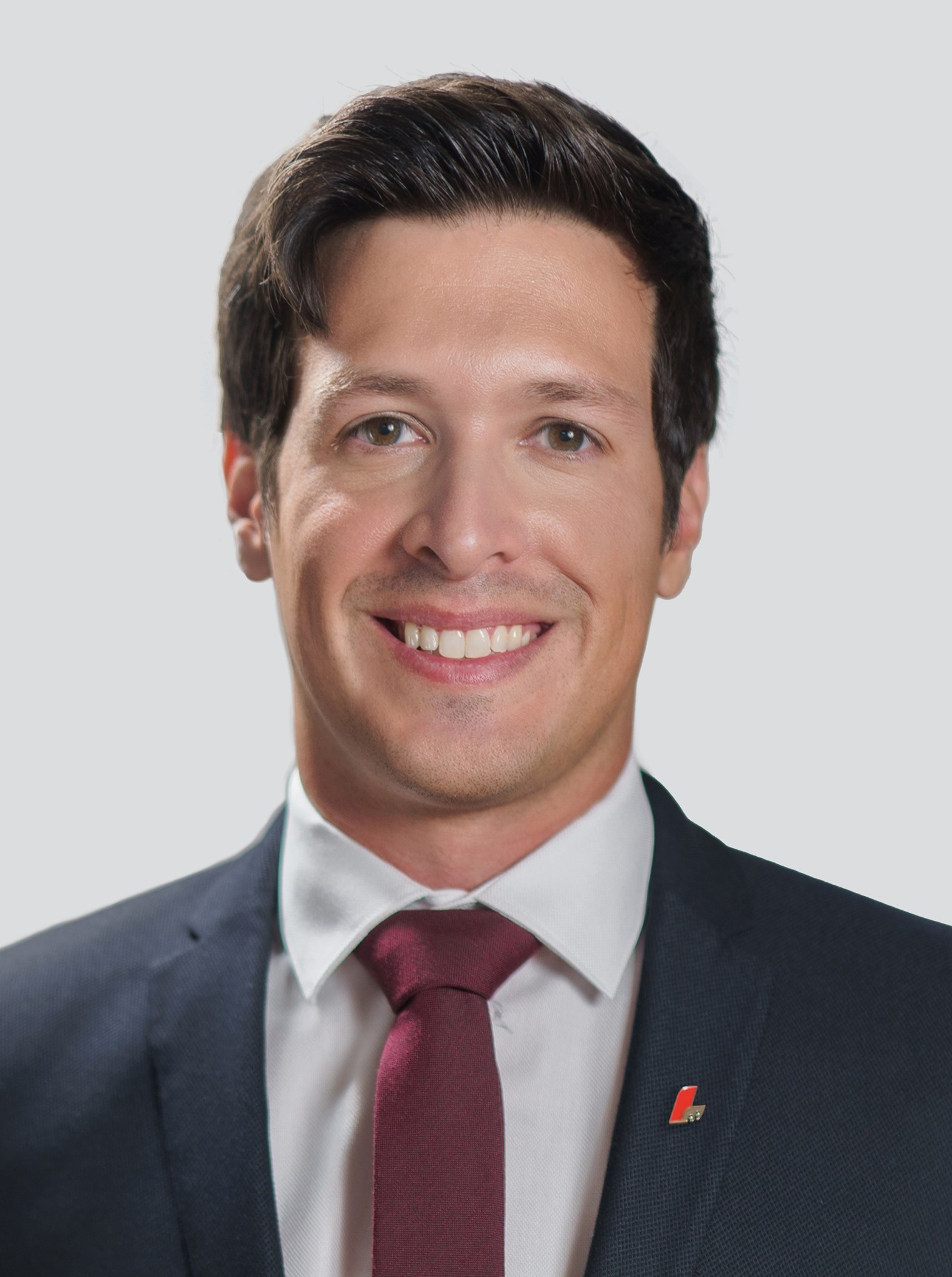
- Portrait of Boyer

9th Mayor of Laval, Quebec
- Incumbent
- Assumed office November 13, 2021
- Preceded by: Marc Demers

Laval City Councillor
- In office 2013–2021
- Preceded by: Michèle Des Trois Maisons
- Succeeded by: Christine Poirier
- Constituency: Duvernay–Pont-Viau

Personal details
- Born: c. 1988
- Party: Mouvement Lavallois

Stéphane Boyer (French pronunciation: [stefan bwaje]; born c. 1988) is a Canadian politician. He was elected as mayor of Laval, Quebec in the 2021 mayoral election, succeeding Marc Demers. Elected at the age of 33, he is the youngest mayor in the history of the city.

== Biography ==
Boyer grew up in the Pont-Viau neighbourhood of Laval. He is a graduate of a political communications program at Université du Québec à Montréal.

Before being elected as mayor, Boyer was a city councillor representing District 4 (Duvernay–Pont-Viau) on Laval City Council. He was first elected to council in the 2013 municipal elections and was re-elected in 2017. As a city councillor, he was involved in a number of local issues, including the upgrading of the entrance of the Viau Bridge. He then took on more responsibility as part of the city's executive council, eventually becoming the committee's vice president. He became leader of the Mouvement lavallois party in April 2021.

Boyer also wrote a book called "Un Monde de Différences" ("A world of differences") and co-wrote "11 brefs essais pour des villes résilientes et durables" ("11 brief essays for resilient and sustainable cities").

On September 2026, Boyer announced that he had brain tumor. On October 2026, he annouced that the tumor was successfully removed.
