= Action Laval =

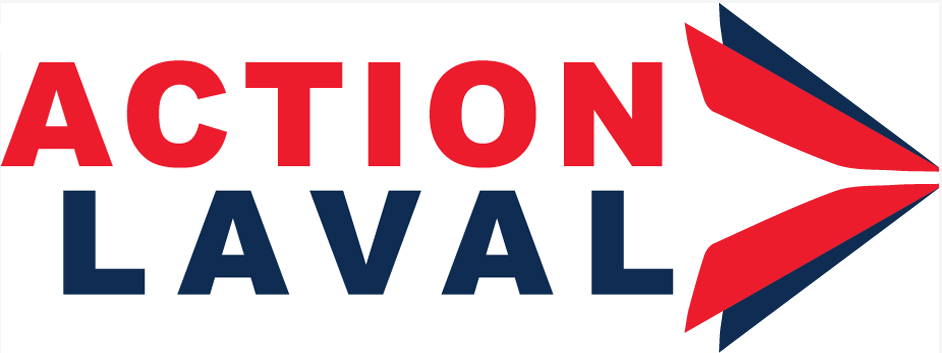
- Abbreviation: AL
- Leader: Achille Cifelli
- Founder: Jean-Claude Gobé
- Founded: April 2013
- Colours: Navy blue and red
- Seats on Laval City Council: 2 / 22

Website
- http://actionlaval.com

Action Laval is a political party active at the municipal level in Québec in the City of Laval. The party was founded by the former provincial deputy for LaFontaine, Jean-Claude Gobé in April 2013, in regard of the municipal elections of November 3, 2013, in the province of Quebec. Two city councilors were elected, placing the party second in the ballot and became the official opposition.

Since December 2019, Action Laval has four city councilors : Aglaia Revelakis (Chomedey), Paolo Galati (Saint-Vincent-de-Paul), David De Cotis (Saint-Bruno) and Isabella Tassoni (Laval-des-Rapides).

On June 30, 2021, Action Laval announced its new leader, Sophie Trottier, who was the party's candidate for mayor in Laval.

== Creation ==
Action Laval was founded in April 2013 by Jean-Claude Gobé, an ex-member in the Quebec National Assembly for the provincial electoral district of LaFontaine from 1985 until 2003.

At the November 2013 municipal elections, the party finished second with 24.3% of expressed ballots, establishing the party for good. Two candidates won their respective district, Paolo Galati in St-Vincent-de-Paul and Aglaia Revelakis in Chomedey. Action Laval formed the official opposition.

== Political Values ==
Gobé's party electoral campaign was focus on local services. Action Laval wanted to improve local services for the population, such as adding bike paths, sidewalks, etc. Commercial streets were proposed to be revitalized according to party's leader. The party made a point in listening to the people and defend their interests. The leader committed to improving the public transport system to better adapt it to the needs of users. Laval police services were proposed to be improved by Jean-Claude Gobé, by increasing its financial and human resources so that Laval residents have access to quality police services.

== Action Laval's Team ==
As soon as November 2020 the party announced some of its candidates for the election of November 2021. Christian Le Bouc in the district of Laval-les-Îles, the party's president, Archie T. Cifelli, in the district of Val-des-Arbres, the former spokesperson of Laval School board parents' committee, Marc-Patrick Roy in Orée-des-Bois, and Louise Labrie in Sainte-Rose will try to get elected. Originally elected in November 2013, city councillors Aglaïa Revelakis, David De Cotis, and Paolo Galati will look to be re-elected for a third term at the November 7, 2021 municipal elections. Isabella Tassoni will try to get her second term.

Following the November 2021 Municipal Elections in Laval, Aglaia Revelakis, David De Cotis, and Paolo Galati are re-elected in addition to Achille Cifelli, and Isabelle Piché which are elected for the first time

== Sources ==
- http://www.courrierlaval.com/actualites/2017/6/19/action-laval-devoile-ses-priorites.html
- http://princearthurherald.com/fr/quebec-canada/election-municipale-de-laval-qui-est-jean-claude-gobe-le-chef-daction-laval-et-candidat-la-mairie
- http://www.courrierlaval.com/actualites/politique/2016/11/13/le-chef-de-l-opposition-lance-sa-campagne.html
