= Marc Demers =

Canadian politician

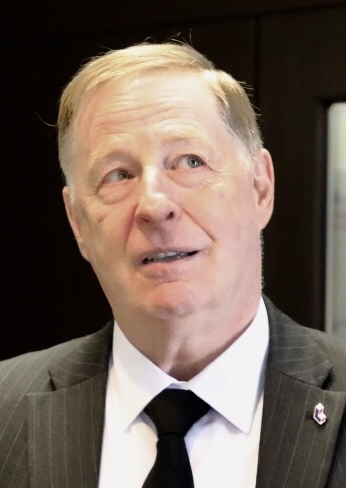
- Demers in 2018

8th Mayor of Laval, Quebec
- In office November 13, 2013 – November 13, 2021
- Preceded by: Gilles Vaillancourt
- Succeeded by: Stéphane Boyer

Personal details
- Born: August 1951 Montreal, Quebec, Canada
- Party: Mouvement Lavallois
- Spouse: Jeanne D'Arc Bélisle

Marc Demers is a Canadian politician, who served as mayor of Laval from 2013 to 2021. He was elected in the city's 2013 municipal election. A former police officer, he took office at a time when the city was under trusteeship due to a corruption scandal that had enveloped his predecessors Gilles Vaillancourt and Alexandre Duplessis.

In 2017, Demers announced that a portion of the money repaid to the city by the convicted former mayors would be set aside to create a fund for disadvantaged youth in the city.

== Upbringing ==
Demers was born in August 1951 to a father who owned a private investigating firm and who was once an RCMP officer. Demers' father died young in 1959 and his dad's once successful business went bankrupt. The firm's bankruptcy plunged the Demers family into near poverty, where his mother struggled to take care of the family, which consisted of five kids. The Demers lived in rent-subsidized apartments.

Demers graduated from St. Maxime high school.

== Career ==
Demers became a police officer in 1971. In the early 1980s he discovered that the former mayor of Laval, Gilles Vaillancourt, was engaged in fraudulent activity. Demers found evidence that councilor Vaillancourt, at the time, held money in a local credit union under a false name to avoid paying more income taxes.
