= 2009 Quebec municipal elections =

- November 1, 2009

Municipal elections took place throughout Quebec, Canada, on November 1, 2009, to replace mayors and councillors.

== Acton Vale ==
Candidate	Vote	%
Éric Charbonneau	1,689	60.6
Juliette Dupuis (X)	1,096	39.4

== Alma ==
Candidate	Vote	%
Marc Asselin	6,170	49.1
Lucille Gagnon	4,204	33.5
Pierre Ste-Marie	1,954	15.6
Sylvain Tremblay	231	1.8

== Amos ==
Candidate	Vote	%
Ulrick Chérubin (X)	3,445	83.9
Maurice Martineau	539	13.1
Robert Audette	121	2.9

== Amqui ==
Candidate	Vote	%
Gaëtan Ruest (X)	1,076	42.5
Normand Boulianne	799	31.6
Monique Vermette-Leclerc	656	25.9

== Asbestos ==
Candidate	Vote	%
Hugues Grimard	1,612	52.1
Jean-Philippe Bachand (X)	1,482	47.9

== Aumond ==
Candidate	Vote	%
Denis Charron	289	59.6
Germain St-Amour (X)	121	24.9
Luc Richard	75	15.5

== Baie-Comeau ==
Candidate	Vote	%
Christine Brisson	3,852	43.3
Michel St-Laurent	1,859	20.9
Luc Imbeault	1,836	20.6
Jean-Yves Côté	1,355	15.2

== Baie-Saint-Paul ==
Candidate	Vote	%
Jean Fortin (X)	1,875	53.2
Pierre André Thomas	1,647	46.8

== Beaconsfield ==
Candidate	Vote	%
David Pollock	3,962	62.83
Bob Benedetti (X)	1,938	30.73
Hela Labene	406	6.44

== Beauceville ==
Candidate	Vote	%
Luc Provençal	2,159	80.7
Jacques Bélanger	516	19.3

== Beauharnois ==
Candidate	Vote	%
Claude Hainault	3,312	63.5
Daniel Charlebois (X)	1,905	36.5

== Bécancour ==
Candidate	Vote	%
Maurice Richard (X)	Acclaimed	

== Beloeil ==
Candidate	Party	Vote	%
Diane Lavoie (X)	Beloeil gagnant	3,921	59.47
Claude Lavallée	Équipe Lavallée	2,315	35.11
Sylvain Leduc	Independent	357	5.41

== Blainville ==
Candidate	Party	Vote	%
François Cantin (X)	Vrai Blainville	9,997	71.8
Florent Gravel	Notre Blainville	3,925	28.2

== Boileau ==
Candidate	Vote	%
Henri Gariepy (X)	136	48.2
Nadine Proulx	95	33.7
Jean-Pierre Melloy	51	18.1

== Boisbriand ==
Candidate	Party	Vote	%
Marlene Cordato	Ralliement des citoyens de Boisbriand	4,836	52.8
Sylvie St-Jean (X)	Équipe Sylvie St-Jean	4,326	47.2

Following media reports, the Directeur général des élections du Québec announced an investigation as to whether construction entrepreneur Lino Zambito attempted to persuade two opposition councillors to allow the incumbent mayor Sylvie Saint-Jean to be reelected unopposed.

== Boischatel ==
Candidate	Party	Vote	%
Yves Germain (X)	Option Boischatel	1,766	79.9
Serge Leblanc	Renouveau Boischatel	445	20.1

== Bois-des-Filion ==
Candidate	Vote	%
Paul Larocque (X)	Acclaimed	

== Boucherville ==
Candidate	Party	Vote	%
Jean Martel	Option citoyens - citoyennes	7,726	50.55
Reynald Gagné	Renouveau démocratique	4,868	31.85
Armand Lefebvre	Action Boucherville	1,998	13.07
Rémi Bergeron	Independent	579	3.79
Réal Belisle	Independent	114	0.75

== Bowman ==
Candidate	Vote	%
Michel David	231	62.3
Gaetan Bastien	140	37.7

== Bromont ==
Candidate	Vote	%
Pauline Quinlan (X)	2,205	75.9
Gilles Duchesne	700	24.1

== Brossard ==
Candidate	Party	Vote	%
Paul Leduc	Priority Brossard	14,946	70.3
Jean-Marc Pelletier (X)	Brossard Democracy	6,322	29.7

== Brownsburg-Chatham ==
Candidate	Vote	%
Georges Dinel	1,568	63.8
Lise Bourgault (X)	888	36.2

== Bryson ==
Candidate	Vote	%
John Griffin	203	66.3
Francis Cahill	103	33.7

== Campbell's Bay ==
Candidate	Vote	%
William Stewart	285	54.7
Cletus Ferrigan	151	29.0
Jean-Louis Auger (X)	85	16.3

== Candiac ==
Candidate	Vote	%
André J. Côté (X)	Acclaimed	

== Cantley ==
Candidate	Vote	%
Steve Harris (X)	1,035	60.8
Mario Noel	666	39.2

== Carignan ==
Candidate	Party	Vote	%
Louise Lavigne	Équipe Louise Lavigne	1,753	60.5
Jean-Guy Legendre (X)	Équipe Legendre	1,146	39.5

== Chambly ==
Candidate	Party	Vote	%
Denis Lavoie (X)	Action Chambly	4,686	54.6
Pierre Bourbonnais	Parti municipal Chambly	3,902	45.4

== Chandler ==
Candidate	Vote	%
Louisette Langlois	1,896	43.5
Claude Cyr (X)	1,744	40.1
Luc Legresley	714	16.4

== Charlemagne ==
Candidate	Vote	%
Normand Grenier (X)	Acclaimed	

== Châteauguay ==
Candidate	Party	Vote	%
Nathalie Simon	Citizen's Action	8,659	56.5
Michel Énault	Châteauguay Party	4,502	29.4
Anthony Boffice	Independent	2,161	14.1

== Chelsea ==
Candidate	Vote	%
Caryl Green	1,345	56.3
Liam Fitzgerald	1,043	43.7

== Chertsey ==
Candidate	Vote	%
Jocelyn Gravel (X)	Acclaimed	

== Chibougamau ==
Candidate	Vote	%
Manon Cyr	1,878	62.4
Mario Fortin	732	24.3
Christian Claveau	400	13.3

== Coaticook ==
Candidate	Vote	%
Bertrand Lamoureux (X)	2,118	54.5
Charles Poulin	1,769	45.5

== Contrecoeur ==
Candidate	Party	Vote	%
Suzanne Dansereau (X)	Équipe Dansereau	1,344	50.4
Richard Girouard	Renouveau Girouard	1,321	49.6

== Cookshire-Eaton ==
Candidate	Vote	%
Normand Potvin (X)	Acclaimed	

== Coteau-du-Lac ==
Candidate	Vote	%
Robert Sauvé (X)	Acclaimed	

== Côte Saint-Luc ==
Candidate	Vote	%
Anthony Housefather (X)	Acclaimed	

== Cowansville ==
Candidate	Vote	%
Arthur Fauteux (X)	3,019	63.44
André Leroux	1,740	36.56

== Delson ==
Candidate	Vote	%
Gilles Meloche	Acclaimed	

== Deux-Montagnes ==
Candidate	Party	Vote	%
Marc Lauzon (X)	Action Deux-Montanges	3,180	50.5
Robert Landry	Robert Landry Team	3,112	49.5

== Dolbeau-Mistassini ==
Candidate	Vote	%
Georges Simard (X)	3,141	51.1
Réjean Lalancette	3,005	48.9

== Dollard-des-Ormeaux ==
Candidate	Vote	%
Ed Janiszewski (X)	8,630	85.4
Shameem Siddiqui	1,471	14.6

It was reported that outgoing mayor Ed Janiszewski had attempted to persuade his opponent Shameem Siddiqui not to run, citing the cost of holding an election. Siddiqui reacted indignantly, saying that Janiszewski was not "the king of Dollard" and that he has the right to run for office.

== Donnacona ==
Candidate	Vote	%
André Marcoux (X)	Acclaimed	

== Dorval ==
Candidate	Vote	%
Edgar Rouleau (X)	Acclaimed	

== Drummondville ==
Candidate	Vote	%
Francine Ruest-Jutras (X)	12,935	70.4
Frédéric Veilleux	5,440	29.6

== Farnham ==
Candidate	Vote	%
Josef Hüsler (X)	1,602	65.6
Jules Lagué	842	34.5

== Fassett ==
Candidate	Vote	%
Michel Rioux (X)	Acclaimed	

== Fort Coulonge ==
Candidate	Vote	%
Raymond Durocher (X)	617	77.8
Michel Graveline	176	22.2

== Gaspé ==
Candidate	Vote	%
François Roussy (X)	Acclaimed	

== Gatineau ==
See 2009 Gatineau municipal election

At 8:59 PM, CBC reported that Marc Bureau, the incumbent mayor of Gatineau had won the Gatineau mayoral race.

Candidate	Vote	%
Marc Bureau (X)	30,929	44.1%
Aurèle Desjardins	18,551	25.5%
Tony Cannavino	17,119	24.4%
Luc Desjardins	1,266	1.8%
Roger J. Fleury	1,198	1.7%
Richard Gravel	1,052	1.5%

== Gracefield ==
Candidate	Vote	%
Real Rochon (X)	979	66.5
Celine Deslauriers	406	26.7
Paul Bertrand	87	5.9

== Granby ==
Candidate	Vote	%
Richard Goulet (X)	10,083	49.33
Toni Lynn Trottier	6,996	34.08
René Guillette	1,863	9.11
Diane Racicot	1,499	7.33

== Hampstead ==
Candidate	Vote	%
William Steinberg (X)	1,921	61%
David Sternthal	825	39%

== Hudson ==
Candidate	Vote	%
Michael Elliott (X)	Acclaimed	

== Joliette ==
Candidate	Party	Vote	%
René Laurin (X)	Action Joliette	3,425	75.2
Barnard Gagnon	Independent	1,127	24.8

== Kazabazua ==
Candidate	Vote	%
Ota Hora	194	47.5
Ron Laflamme	99	24.3
Robert Petrin	88	21.6
Cecil Crites	27	6.6

== Kirkland ==
Candidate	Vote	%
John W. Meaney (X)	Acclaimed	

== Lac-Beauport ==
Candidate	Party	Vote	%
Michel Beaulieu	Vision Lac-Beauport	1,429	56.7
André Parent	Action Lac-Beauport	1,090	43.3

== Lac-Brome ==
Candidate	Vote	%
Gilles Decelles	1,309	52.8
Pierre Marchand	865	34.9
Stanley E. Neil	247	10.0
Michel Ayotte	57	2.3

== Lachute ==
Candidate	Party	Vote	%
Daniel Mayer (X)	Équipe Mayer	2,516	47.7
Denis Sabourin	Parti du retour aux citoyens	1,254	23.8
Carl Péloquin	Équipe Péloquin	1,102	20.9
Denis Richer	Independent	398	7.6

== Lac-Mégantic ==
Candidate	Vote	%
Colette Roy-Laroche (X)	Acclaimed	

== La Malbaie ==
Candidate	Vote	%
Lise Lapointe	2,393	54.2
Rosaire Bertrand	2,023	45.8

== L'Ancienne-Lorette ==
Candidate	Party	Vote	%
Émile Loranger (X)	Équipe Loranger	5,024	64.8
Daniel Dupuis	Démocratie L'Ancienne-Lorette	2,735	35.2

== La Pêche ==
Candidate	Vote	%
Robert Bussière (X)	Acclaimed	

== La Prairie ==
Candidate	Vote	%
Lucie Roussel (X)	Acclaimed	

== La Sarre ==
Candidate	Vote	%
Normand Houde (X)	1,339	52.2
Aldé Bellavance	1,228	47.8

== L'Assomption ==
Candidate	Party	Vote	%
Louise T. Francoeur	Pour vous, l'équipe Francoeur	2,711	43.9
Jacques Raynault	L'Assomption en tête	2,013	32.6
Pierre Gour (X)	Équipe Pierre Gour	1,451	23.5

== La Tuque ==
Candidate	Vote	%
Normand Beaudoin	3,872	65.5
Réjean Gaudreault (X)	1,864	32.0
Jean-Paul Tremblay	88	1.5

== Laval ==
At 9:12 PM, CBC reported that "Gilles Vaillancourt has been reelected for a sixth time as Laval mayor."

2009 Laval municipal election: Mayor of Laval
Party	Candidate	Votes	%
Parti PRO des Lavallois	(x)Gilles Vaillancourt	60,045	61.29
Mouvement lavallois	Lydia Aboulian	22,179	22.64
Parti au service du citoyen	Robert Bordeleau	14,577	14.88
Independent	Régent Millette	682	0.70
Independent	Rick Blatter	482	0.49
Total valid votes		97,965	100

== Lavaltrie ==
Candidate	Party	Vote	%
Jean Claude Gravel	Parti lavaltrois	2,550	61.5
Norman Blackburn (X)	Action Lavaltrie	1,594	38.5

== Les Cèdres ==
Candidate	Vote	%
Géraldine T. Quesnel (X)	1,359	52.1
Raymond Larouche	1,248	47.9

== Les Îles-de-la-Madeleine ==
Candidate	Vote	%
Joêl Arsenau (X)	Acclaimed	

== Lévis ==
Candidate	Vote	%
Danielle Roy-Marinelli (X)	Acclaimed	

== L'Île-Perrot ==
Candidate	Vote	%
Marc Roy (X)	Acclaimed	

== Longueuil ==
See 2009 Longueuil municipal election

At 10:43 PM, TVA reported that Caroline St-Hilaire had been elected Mayor of Longueuil. As of 12:40 AM, the results are:

Candidate	Party	Vote	%
Caroline St-Hilaire	Action Longueuil	34,291	51.41%
Jacques Goyette	Parti municipal Longueuil	30,504	45.74%

== Lorraine ==
Candidate	Party	Vote	%
Ramez Ayoub	Équipe Ayoub	1,809	51.1
Boniface Dalle-Vedove (X)	Équipe Dalle-Vedove	1,730	48.9

== Louiseville ==
Candidate	Vote	%
Guy Richard (X)	2,054	83.6
Michel Bellemare	404	16.4

== Low ==
Candidate	Vote	%
Morris O'Connor (X)	310	73.6
Fay Pinard	111	26.4

== Magog ==
Candidate	Vote	%
Vicki May Hamm	5,649	50.4
Marc Poulin (X)	4,668	41.7
Alain Vanden Eynden	890	7.9

== Maniwaki ==
Candidate	Vote	%
Robert Coulombe (X)	Acclaimed	

== Marieville ==
Candidate	Party	Vote	%
Alain Ménard	Independent	1,384	50.7
France A. Dussault	Parti municipal Marieville	1,121	41.1
Denis Guertin	Independent	224	8.2

== Mascouche ==
Candidate	Party	Vote	%
Richard Marcotte (X)	Ralliement Mascouche	7,189	53.4
Serge Hamelin	Horizon Mascouche	6,262	46.6

== Matane ==
Candidate	Vote	%
Claude Canuel	2,236	33.5
Bernard Tremblay	1,491	22.4
Jean Nazair	1,089	16.3
Anick Fortin	794	11.9
Guy A. Gauthier	726	10.9
Rodrigue Drapeau	333	5.0

== Mayo ==
Candidate	Vote	%
Gaetan Brunet	176	53.0
Normand Vachon (X)	124	37.3
George Boros	32	9.6

== McMasterville ==
Candidate	Vote	%
Gilles Plante (X)	Acclaimed	

== Mercier ==
Candidate	Party	Vote	%
Jacques Lambert (X)	Équipe Lambert	2,753	67.5
Jean-Luc Colpron	Option Mercier	1,328	32.5

== Mirabel ==
Candidate	Vote	%
Hubert Meilleur (X)	Acclaimed	

== Montebello ==
Candidate	Vote	%
Pierre Bertrand	326	55.3
Jean-Paul Descoeurs (X)	263	44.7

== Mont-Joli ==
Candidate	Vote	%
Jean Bélanger (X)	1,513	60.3
Laurent Lajoie	996	39.7

== Mont-Laurier ==
Candidate	Vote	%
Michel Adrien (X)	Acclaimed	

== Montmagny ==
Candidate	Vote	%
Jean-Guy Desrosiers (X)	Acclaimed	

== Montpellier ==
Candidate	Vote	%
Pierre Bernier	383	51.8
Stephane Seguin (X)	252	34.1
Pierre Neveu	54	7.3
Louis Day	36	4.9

== Montreal ==
See 2009 Montreal municipal election

At 10:44 PM, TVA reported that Gérald Tremblay had been re-elected as mayor of Montreal.

Candidate	Party	Vote	%
Gérald Tremblay (X)	Union Montréal	117438	37.28%
Louise Harel	Vision Montréal	104294	33.11%
Richard Bergeron	Projet Montréal	80776	25.64%
Louise O'Sullivan	Parti Montréal Ville-Marie	6348	2.02%
Michel Bédard	Fierté Montréal	4096	1.30%
Michel Prairie	Independent	2064	0.66%

== Montréal-Ouest ==
Candidate	Vote	%
Beny Masella	1,311	78.1
Emile Subirana	367	21.9

== Mont-Royal ==
Candidate	Party	Vote	%
Vera Danyluk (X)	Action Mont-Royal	3,263	66.8
André Krepec	Independent	1,624	33.2

== Mont-Saint-Hilaire ==
Candidate	Party	Vote	%
Michel Gilbert (X)	Action Mont-Saint-Hilaire	3,106	57.4
Denise Loiselle	Voix citoyenne de Mont-Saint-Hilaire	2,309	42.6

== Mont-Tremblant ==
Candidate	Vote	%
Pierre Pilon (X)	Acclaimed	

== Nicolet ==
Candidate	Vote	%
Alain Drouin (X)	Acclaimed	

== Notre-Dame-de-l'Île-Perrot ==
Candidate	Party	Vote	%
Marie-Claude Beaulieu-Nichols	Option Citoyens	1,938	52.1
Richard Mainville	Independent	935	25.1
Serge Roy (X)	Ralliement Notre-Dame-de-l'Île-Perrot	848	22.8

== Notre-Dame-des-Prairies ==
Candidate	Vote	%
Alain Larue (X)	1,636	52.4
Clairette Casaubon	1,487	47.6

== Notre-Dame-du-Mont-Carmel ==
Candidate	Vote	%
Pierre A. Bouchard (X)	Acclaimed	

== Otterburn Park ==
Candidate	Vote	%
Michel Martin	1,796	72.8
Gérard Schafroth (X)	672	27.2

== Papineauville ==
Candidate	Vote	%
Gilles Clement	532	46.3
Andre Blais (X)	466	40.6
Gilles Hebert	150	13.1

== Pincourt ==
Candidate	Vote	%
Yvan Cardinal	1,760	54.7
Michel Kandyba (X)	1,212	37.6
Patrick Doyle	248	7.7

== Plaisance ==
Candidate	Vote	%
Paulette Lalande (X)	Acclaimed	

== Plessisville ==
Candidate	Vote	%
Réal Ouellet (X)	Acclaimed	

== Pointe-Calumet ==
Candidate	Vote	%
Jacques Séguin (X)	Acclaimed	

== Pointe-Claire ==
Candidate	Vote	%
Bill McMurchie (X)	Acclaimed	

== Pontiac ==
Candidate	Vote	%
Edward McCann (X)	902	49.2
Garry Dagenais	790	43.1
Jo-Anne Simard	142	7.7

== Pont-Rouge ==
Candidate	Vote	%
Claude Bégin (X)	Acclaimed	

== Port-Cartier ==
Candidate	Vote	%
Laurence Méthot (X)	Acclaimed	

== Prévost ==
Candidate	Party	Vote	%
Germain Richer	Alliance des citoyens(nes) de Prévost	1,872	46.67
Claude Charbonneau	Parti prévostois	1,260	31.41
Guy Guénette	Gens de Prévost	815	20.32
Stéphane Laroche	Independent	64	1.6

== Princeville ==
Candidate	Vote	%
Gilles Fortier (X)	Acclaimed	

== Quebec City ==
At 8:21 PM, CBC Montreal reported that incumbent mayor Régis Labeaume had won the election with 82% of the vote.

Candidate	Party	Vote	%
Régis Labeaume (X)	Équipe Labeaume	153,847	79.9
Jeff Fillion	Independent	16,393	8.5
Yonnel Bonaventure	Défi Vert de Québec	15,614	8.1
Jean-Paul Marchand	Independent	3,224	1.7
Langis D. Harvey	Independent	1,382	0.7
Philippe O'Brien	Independent	1,052	0.5
Lionel Laporte	Independent	965	0.5

Council Election, Maizerets-Lairet Ward:

Candidate	Vote	%
Ginette Picard-Lavoie (X)	4,286	67.36
Jean-Thomas Grantham	1,106	17.38
Nicolas Frichot	648	10.18
André Houle	323	5.08
Total votes	6,363	100

== Rawdon ==
Candidate	Party	Vote	%
Jacques Beauregard	Option Rawdon	2,582	58.6
Louise Major (X)	Équipe Major	1,823	41.4

== Repentigny ==
Candidate	Party	Vote	%
Chantal Deschamps (X)	Équipe Deschamps	12,236	44.9
Jean Langlois	Parti démocratique de Repentigny-Le Gardeur	10,091	37.0
Michel Carignan	Parti des contribuables de Repentigny	4,952	18.2

== Richelieu ==
Candidate	Party	Vote	%
Jacques Ladouceur	Coalition richeloise	818	43.86
Odette Renaud	Independent	552	29.6
Françcois Villeneuve	Independent	495	26.54

== Rigaud ==
Candidate	Vote	%
Réal Brazeau (X)	Acclaimed	

== Rimouski ==
Candidate	Vote	%
Éric Forest (X)	15,804	95.8
Gilles Morneau	691	4.2

== Ripon ==
Candidate	Vote	%
Luc Desjardins	Acclaimed	

== Rivière-du-Loup ==
Candidate	Vote	%
Michel Morin (X)	Acclaimed	

== Roberval ==
Candidate	Vote	%
Michel Larouche (X)	2,718	55.1
Alexandre Gauthier	2,218	44.9

== Rosemère ==
Candidate	Vote	%
Hélène Daneault (X)	Acclaimed	

== Rouyn-Noranda ==
Candidate	Vote	%
Mario Provencher (X)	7,273	47.4
Jean-Claude Beauchemin	4,063	26.5
Philip Bradley	4,022	26.2

== Saguenay ==
At 9:08 PM, CBC reported that Jean Tremblay had won the mayoral race in Saguenay.

Candidate	Vote	%
Jean Tremblay (X)	45,088	77.8
Michel Potvin	12,861	22.2

== Saint-Amable ==
Candidate	Party	Vote	%
François Gamache	Essor	1,389	59.6
Réal Dubuc	Independent	781	33.5
Luc Gemme	Independent	160	6.9

== Saint-Augustin-de-Desmaures ==
Candidate	Party	Vote	%
Marcel Corriveau (X)	Horizon Saint-Augustin	4,240	89.1
Mathieu Bérubé-Beaumont	Independent	521	10.9

== Saint-Basile-le-Grand ==
Candidate	Party	Vote	%
Bernard Gagnon	Parti grandbasilois	2,759	45.1
Josée LaForest	Équipe LaForest	1,897	31.0
Michel Carrières (X)	Action municipale grandbasiloise	979	16.0
Guy Raymond	Action citoyens	478	7.8

== Saint-Bruno-de-Montarville ==
Candidate	Party	Vote	%
Claude Benjamin (X)	Alliance municipale de Saint-Bruno-de-Montarville	4,298	45.52
Martin Murray	Parti montarvillois	3,456	36.61
André Besner	Independent	1,687	17.87

== Saint-Calixte ==
Candidate	Party	Vote	%
Louis-Charles Thouin	union pour le changement	1,226	56.4
Clément Charest	Parti gestion démocratique	583	26.8
André Ricard	Voix des citoyens(nes)	232	10.7
Johanne Cloutier	Pro-calixtien	133	6.1

== Saint-Césaire ==
Candidate	Party	Vote	%
Serge Gendron	Vision Saint-Césaire	1,130	53.1
Yvon Boucher (X)	Unité Saint-Césaire	605	28.4
Dorothée Gingras	Independent	286	13.4
Daniel Kabamba	Independent	109	5.1

== Saint-Charles-Borromée ==
Candidate	Vote	%
André Hénault (X)	Acclaimed	

== Saint-Colomban ==
Candidate	Party	Vote	%
Jacques Labrosse	Renouveau Saint-Colomban	1,996	55.6
Roland Charbonneau (X)	Équipe Charbonneau	1,260	35.1
Luc Martin	Parti Rassembleur de Saint-Colomban	194	5.4
Phillippe Aubé	Independent	139	3.9

== Saint-Constant ==
Candidate	Party	Vote	%
Gilles Pepin (X)	Action municipale Saint-Constant	4,733	54.6
Yves-André Ferland	Défis Saint-Constant	3,932	45.4

== Saint-Sixte ==
Candidate	Vote	%
Andre Belisle	Acclaimed	

== Sainte-Adèle ==
Candidate	Party	Vote	%
Réjean Charbonneau	Parti vision citoyens	2,683	55.9
Claude Descôteaux (X)	Équipe Claude Descôteaux	1,957	40.7
David Sommer Rovins	Independent	163	3.4

== Sainte-Agathe-des-Monts ==
Candidate	Party	Vote	%
Denis Chalifoux	Équipe Denis Chalifoux	1,225	31.1
Gilles Legault	Équipe Gilles Legault	1,088	27.6
Kathleen S. Labelle	Équipe Kathleen S. Labelle	711	18.1
Sylvain Latreille	Parti des citoyens de Sainte-Agathe-des-Monts	515	13.1
Raymond Le Saux	Independent	280	7.1
Michel Rivard	Independent	120	3.0

== Sainte-Anne-de-Bellevue ==
Candidate	Vote	%
Francis Deroo	1,256	58.0
Bill Tierney (X)	911	42.0

== Sainte-Anne-des-Monts ==
Candidate	Vote	%
Micheline Pelletier (X)	1,773	60.7
Petit Vallée	1,146	39.3

== Sainte-Anne-des-Plaines ==
Candidate	Party	Vote	%
Guy Charbonneau	Parti Vision Action	2,778	56.0
Catherine Collin (X)	Sainte-Anne-Plus	2,186	44.0

== Sainte-Catherine ==
Candidate	Party	Vote	%
Jocelyne Bates (X)	Parti de l'équipe Bates	3,080	71.0
Monique Roy Verville	Alternative Sainte-Catherine	1,261	29.0

== Sainte-Catherine-de-la-Jacques-Cartier ==
Candidate	Vote	%
Jacques Marcotte (X)	1,086	53.9
Gilles Piché	928	46.1

== Sainte-Julie ==
Candidate	Vote	%
Suzanne Roy (X)	Acclaimed	

== Sainte-Julienne ==
Candidate	Party	Vote	%
Marcel Jetté	Équipe Marcel Jetté	1,733	46.0
Pierre Mireault (X)	Action vision Sainte-Julienne	768	20.4
Claude Roy	Progrès Sainte-Julienne	719	19.1
Danielle Bédard	Parti des citoyens de Sainte-Julienne	327	8.7
Nicole Sabourin	Independent	217	5.8

== Sainte-Marie ==
Candidate	Vote	%
Harold Guay (X)	Acclaimed	

== Sainte-Marthe-sur-le-Lac ==
Candidate	Party	Vote	%
Sonia Paulus (X)	Nouvelle option	2,531	50.0
Claude Amann	Équipe Claude Amann	1,639	32.4
Richard Paquette	Équipe des Marthelacquois	896	17.7

== Sainte-Sophie ==
Candidate	Vote	%
Yvon Brière (X)	Acclaimed	

== Sainte-Thérèse ==
Candidate	Party	Vote	%
Sylvie Surprenant (X)	Parti Municipal Énergie	4,900	69.0
Annick Hupperetz	Vision action Saint-Thérèse	2,198	31.0

== Saint-André-Avellin ==
Candidate	Vote	%
Therese Whissell (X)	873	60.9
Andre Robert	358	25.0
Dany Ouellet	203	14.2

== Saint-Eustache ==
Candidate	Party	Vote	%
Pierre Charron (X)	Option Saint-Eustache	10,031	71.6
Paule Fortier	Équipe Paule Fortier	3,974	28.4

== Saint-Félicien ==
Candidate	Vote	%
Gilles Potvin (X)	Acclaimed	

== Saint-Félix-de-Valois ==
Candidate	Vote	%
Claude Landreville	1,962	86.0
Gilles Fréchette (X)	319	14.0

== Saint-Georges ==
Candidate	Party	Vote	%
François Fecteau	Rassemblement Saint-Georges	5,456	47.3
Marcel Bérubé	Développement Saint-Georges	4,143	35.9
Serge Veilleux	Independent	1,790	15.5
Guy Roberge	Independent	144	1.2

== Saint-Hippolyte ==
Candidate	Party	Vote	%
Bruno Laroche	Équipe Bruno Laroche	1,627	58.1
Georges Loulou	Independent	583	20.8
Gilles Rousseau (X)	Équipe Rousseau	467	16.7
Hélène Noel Watier	Independent	125	4.5

== Saint-Hyacinthe ==
Candidate	Vote	%
Claude Bernier (X)	7,798	43.2
Huguette Corbeil	7,331	40.6
Jean-Marie Pelletier	2,907	16.1

== Saint-Jean-sur-Richelieu ==
Candidate	Party	Vote	%
Gilles Dolbec (X)	Équipe Dolbec	11,838	39.5
Jean Lamoureux	Action civique	9,100	30.4
Lucille Méthé	Independent	6,497	21.7
Joseph Khoury	Union johannaise	2,515	8.4

== Saint-Jérôme ==
Candidate	Vote	%
Marc Gascon (X)	Acclaimed	

== Saint-Lambert ==
Candidate	Vote	%
Philippe Brunet	2,707	34.9
Éric Bourbeau	2,670	34.4
Jill Lacoursière	2,375	30.6

== Saint-Lambert-de-Lauzon ==
Candidate	Vote	%
François Barret (X)	1,019	63.1
Lisette Moreau	597	36.9

== Saint-Lazare ==
Candidate	Party	Vote	%
Pierre Kary	Shared Vision	2,386	43.0
Michel St-Louis	Parti Saint-Lazare	1,992	35.9
Paul Carzoli (X)	St-Lazare Unified	1,166	21.0

== Saint-Lin-Laurentides ==
Candidate	Party	Vote	%
André Auger	Parti André Auger	2,506	57.5
Robert Jobin	Équipe Robert Jobin	1,855	42.5

== Saint-Philippe ==
Candidate	Party	Vote	%
Lise Martin	Équipe Martin	1,032	42.0
Fernande D. Lussier	Équipe F.D. Lussier	744	30.3
Martine Bechtold	Parti des citoyens	362	14.7
Sylvain Rathé	Independent	318	12.9

== Saint-Pie ==
Candidate	Vote	%
Pierre St-Onge (X)	Acclaimed	

== Saint-Raymond ==
Candidate	Vote	%
Rolland Dion (X)	Acclaimed	

== Saint-Rémi ==
Candidate	Vote	%
Michel Lavoie (X)	1,865	61.1
Sylvie Boyer	1,189	38.9

== Saint-Robert ==
Candidate	Vote	%
Gilles Salvas (X)	453	51.9
Philippe Rochat	419	48.1

== Saint-Sauveur ==
Candidate	Vote	%
Michel Lagacé (X)	Acclaimed	

== Saint-Zotique ==
Candidate	Vote	%
Gaëtane Legault (X)	Acclaimed	

== Salaberry-de-Valleyfield ==
Candidate	Vote	%
Denis Lapointe (X)	7,972	76.7
Sylvain Guérin	2,428	23.3

== Sept-Îles ==
Candidate	Vote	%
Serge Lévesque	5,764	64.5
Marc Fafard	2,996	33.5
Jacques Gélineau	180	2.0

== Shawinigan ==
Candidate	Party	Vote	%
Michel Angers	Independent	11,912	55.2
Yves L. Duhaime	Independent	6,196	28.7
Claude Villemure	Ralliement municipal	3,478	16.1

== Shawville ==
Candidate	Vote	%
Albert Armstrong (X)	545	61.2
Keith Harris	346	38.8

== Shefford ==
Candidate	Vote	%
Jean-Marc Desrochers	947	59.5
Yves Gosselin (X)	456	28.7
Antoine Beaulieu	188	11.8

== Sherbrooke ==
Candidate	Vote	%
Bernard Sévigny	17,173	34.4
Hélène Gravel	17,051	34.2
François Godbout	14,190	28.4
Moustapha Saboun	882	1.8
Denis Pellerin	596	1.2

== Sorel-Tracy ==
Candidate	Vote	%
Réjean Dauplaise	8,134	60.8
Marcel Robert (X)	5,240	39.2

- Réjean Dauplaise was sixty-four years old during the 2009 election, with sixteen years of experience as a councillor in Sorel (prior to its amalgamation with Tracy). He sought election to the amalgamated city's council in 2005 but was defeated. He ran a low-cost campaign with few assistants in 2009 and remarked after the election that he was surprised by his margin of victory.
- Marcel Robert is a businessman in Sorel-Tracy who operated several establishments before his election as the amalgamated city's first mayor in 2000. He promoted environmental issues during his time in office, and in 2005 he accused the city of Montreal of contaminating his community with improperly cleaned water. A year after his defeat, he co-founded a franchise called Frais et Frisket.

== Stoneham-et-Tewkesbury ==
Candidate	Party	Vote	%
Robert Miller	Évolution Cantons-Unis	984	44.7
Gaétane G. St-Laurent (X)	Équipe Gaétane G. St-Laurent	909	41.3
Louis-Yves Poulin	Independent	306	13.9

== Terrebonne ==
Candidate	Party	Vote	%
Jean-Marc Robitaille (X)	Équipe Robitaille	17,431	68.8
Sylvain Lessard	Renouveau Terrebonne	7,918	31.2

== Thetford Mines ==
Candidate	Vote	%
Luc Berthold (X)	8,777	86.1
Bruno Roy	1,418	13.9

== Thurso ==
Candidate	Vote	%
Maurice Boivin	Acclaimed	

== Trois-Rivières ==
Candidate	Party	Vote	%
Yves Lévesque (X)	Independent	25,637	54.9
André Carle	Force 3R	21,077	45.1

== Val-des-Monts ==
Candidate	Vote	%
Jean Lafrenière (X)	1 073	39.6
Pierre Bélec	774	28.6
Michel B. Gauthier	764	28.2
Guy Dostaler	98	3.6

== Val-des-Bois ==
Candidate	Vote	%
Marcel Proulx (X)	Acclaimed	

== Val-d'Or ==
Candidate	Vote	%
Fernand Trahan (X)	7,045	93.5
Gilles Gagnon	516	6.5

== Varennes ==
Candidate	Party	Vote	%
Martin Damphousse	Parti durable	4,397	60.7
Josée Sanfaçon	Action Varennes	1,917	26.4
Michel Tremblay (X)	Independent	934	12.9

== Vaudreuil-Dorion ==
Candidate	Vote	%
Guy Pilon (X)	Acclaimed	

== Verchères ==
Candidate	Vote	%
Alexandre Bélisle	1,357	59.4
Claude Henri	593	26.0
Claude Perreault	333	14.6

== Victoriaville ==
Candidate	Vote	%
Alain Rayes	10,807	62.8
Éric Lefebvre	5,722	33.2
Martin Talbot	524	3.0
René Martineau	161	0.9

== Westmount ==
Candidate	Vote	%
Peter F. Trent (X)	Acclaimed	

== Windsor ==
Candidate	Vote	%
Sylvie Bureau (X)	Acclaimed	

== See also ==
- Municipal elections in Canada
- Electronic voting in Canada
- 2006 Quebec municipal elections
- 2005 Quebec municipal elections

== Sources ==
- November 1, 2009 municipal elections - The Chief Electoral Officer has begun his training tour intended for the stakeholders in municipal elections
- List of candidates
