= Régent Millette =

Aspirant politician in Canada

Personal details
- Born: September 14, 1935
- Died: 21 August 2013 (aged 77) Saint-Charles-Borromée
- Party: Independent
- Other political affiliations: Parti république du Québec, Parti démocratie chrétienne
- Spouse: Claire Séguin
- Profession: Teacher

Régent Millette (September 14, 1935 – August 21, 2013) was a perennial candidate for public office, having run in twenty-five federal, provincial, and municipal elections since 2000. In 2013, he declared "I will run for office until I die". He was a candidate of the Parti démocratie chrétienne du Québec in the 2003 provincial election but has run as an independent in every other campaign. He was a member of the short-lived Parti république du Québec in 2007 but never actually ran under its banner.

Millette has a teaching certificate and a Bachelor of Arts degree from the Université de Montréal and has worked as a teacher. During the 2005 municipal election, he said that he felt a calling to serve the public and would take no salary if elected. He holds socially conservative views; during the 2003 Montreal gay pride parade, he was quoted as saying, "I love everybody but in the Bible they say there are many things that are against nature."

== Political activism ==
A candidate named Régent Millette ran for the Ralliement national in the 1966 Quebec election and received 96 votes (0.46%) for a fifth-place finish against incumbent Liberal cabinet minister Paul Gérin-Lajoie. This may have been the same person.

In March 2006, Mr. Millette was charged with attempting to file a breach of condition and conspiring to file a breach of condition when, at a meeting of Laval city council, he asked questions on behalf of Rick Blatter while the latter had undertaken to respect a court order prohibiting him from communicating with the staff of the town hall and the elected officials of Laval. Following his acquittal, Mr Millette tried to get an indemnity of $95,000 from Ville de Laval but lost his case in 2012. In 2013 the Supreme Court of Canada rejected his request for appeal.

Electoral record
Election	Division	Party	Votes	%	Place	Winner
2000 federal	Laval East	Independent	255	0.44	8/9	Carole-Marie Allard, Liberal
Quebec provincial by-election, 9 April 2001	Mercier	Independent	27	0.16	9/9	Nathalie Rochefort, Liberal
Quebec provincial by-election, 1 October 2001	Blainville	Independent	97	0.43	6/6	Richard Legendre, Parti Québécois
2005 Laval municipal	Mayor of Laval	Independent	606	0.48	4/4	Gilles Vaillancourt, Parti PRO des Lavallois
Quebec provincial by-election, 15 April 2002	Anjou	Independent	72	0.44	5/5	Lise Thériault, Liberal
Quebec provincial by-election, 17 June 2002	Vimont	Independent	212	0.70	4/4	François Gaudreau, Action démocratique du Québec
2003 provincial	Mille-Îles	Parti démocratie chrétienne	113	0.28	5/5	Maurice Clermont, Liberal
2004 federal	Alfred-Pellan	Independent	89	0.17	7/7	Robert Carrier, Bloc Québécois
Quebec provincial by-election, 20 September 2004	Gouin	Independent	33	0.22	7/7	Nicolas Girard, Parti Québécois
2005 Laval municipal	Mayor of Laval	Independent	3,474	4.41	4/4	Gilles Vaillancourt, Parti PRO des Lavallois
Quebec provincial by-election, 12 December 2005	Outremont	Independent	28	0.21	7/7	Raymond Bachand, Liberal
2006 federal	Outremont	Independent	22	0.05	11/11	Jean Lapierre, Liberal
Quebec provincial by-election, 10 April 2006	Sainte-Marie–Saint-Jacques	Independent	28	0.21	7/7	Martin Lemay, Parti Québécois
Quebec provincial by-election, 14 August 2006	Pointe-aux-Trembles	Independent	52	0.41	8/8	André Boisclair, Parti Québécois
Canadian federal by-election, 27 November 2006	Repentigny	Independent	78	0.25	7/7	Raymond Gravel, Bloc Québécois
2007 provincial	Mille-Îles	Independent	96	0.23	6/6	Maurice Clermont, Liberal
Canadian federal by-election, 17 September 2007	Outremont	Independent	32	0.13	11/12	Thomas Mulcair, New Democratic Party
Quebec provincial by-election, 12 May 2008	Pointe-aux-Trembles	Independent	31	0.23	8/8	Nicole Léger, Parti Québécois
Canadian federal by-election, 8 September 2008	Westmount—Ville-Marie	Independent	-	-	-	election cancelled
2008 federal	Alfred-Pellan	Independent	259	0.49	6/6	Robert Carrier, Bloc Québécois
2008 provincial	Mille-Îles	Independent	44	0.13	7/7	Francine Charbonneau, Liberal
Quebec provincial by-election, 22 June 2009	Marguerite-Bourgeoys	Independent	41	0.38	8/8	Clément Gignac, Liberal
2009 Laval municipal	Mayor of Laval	Independent	682	0.70	4/5	Gilles Vaillancourt, Parti PRO des Lavallois
Quebec provincial by-election, 5 July 2010	Vachon	Independent	71	0.53	7/7	Martine Ouellet, Parti Québécois
2011 federal	Alfred-Pellan	Independent	245	0.45	6/6	Rosane Doré Lefebvre, New Democratic Party
Quebec provincial election, 4 September 2012	Mille-Îles	Independent	122	0,38	7/8	Francine Charbonneau, Liberal
2013 Laval municipal	Mayor of Laval	Independent	611	0.53	9/9	Marc Demers, Mouvement lavallois

== Death ==
Millette, aged 77 years old, died on August 21, 2013, at the Joliette Regional Hospital in Saint-Charles-Borromée.
