= 2005 Quebec municipal elections =

Municipal elections in the province of Quebec, Canada

- November 6, 2005

The Canadian province of Quebec held municipal elections in its municipalities on November 6, 2005.

The municipalities in Quebec for the 2005 election were different from the previous 2001 election, as many municipalities had voted to de-amalgamate.

Every municipality in Quebec held elections except Port-Cartier, Thetford Mines, Sept-Îles and in the village and parish of Saint-Georges-de-Cacouna (they were held in 2006).

In addition to the municipalities, the prefects of 8 regional county municipalities were elected:

- Kamouraska
- La Haute-Gaspésie
- La Vallée-de-la-Gatineau
- Le Granit
- Le Haut-Saint-François
- Les Basques
- Les Pays-d'en-Haut
- Témiscouata

Selected results of the November 6 elections are as follows

== Bécancour ==
2005 Bécancour municipal election: Mayor
Candidate	Votes	%
(x)Maurice Richard	2,848	64.86
Pierre Duplessis	1,543	35.14
Total valid votes	4,391	100
Source: "Les maires sortants de Bécancour et de Plessisville sont réélus", Radio-Canada, 6 November 2005, accessed 14 May 2011.

- Pierre Duplessis is a farmer and former town councillor in Bécancour and a founding president of the Godefroy market. During his mayoral campaign, he accused the Richard administration of lacking transparency.

2005 Bécancour municipal election: Council, Ward Six
Candidate	Votes	%
Alain Levesque	2,362	57.67
Christian Richard	1,380	33.69
Blak D. Blackburn	354	8.64
Total valid votes	4,096	100

== Blainville ==
Candidate	Vote	%
François Cantin	X	
Daniel Ratthé		

== Boucherville ==
Candidate	Vote	%
Francine Gadbois	Acclaimed	

== Brossard ==
Candidate	Vote	%
Jean-Marc Pelletier	9,118	57.1
Raymond Guyot	6,854	42.9

== Châteauguay ==
Candidate	Vote	%
Sergio Pavone (inc.)	9,440	60.1
Alain Desjardins	6,266	39.9

== Dollard-des-Ormeaux ==
Candidate	Vote	%
Ed Janiszewski	Acclaimed	

== Drummondville ==
Candidate	Vote	%
Francine Ruest-Jutras (inc.)	Acclaimed	

== Gatineau ==
Candidate	Vote	%
Marc Bureau	55,650	68.3
Yves Ducharme (inc.)	25,834	31.7

== Granby ==
Candidate	Vote	%
Richard Goulet	9,639	57.5
Denis Dumas	5,069	30.2
Guy Racine (inc.)	2,059	12.3

== Laval ==
2005 Laval municipal election: Mayor of Laval
Party	Candidate	Votes	%
Parti PRO des Lavallois	(x)Gilles Vaillancourt	58,804	74.61
Independent	Audrey Boisvert	12,613	16.00
Independent	Emilio Migliozzi	3,928	4.98
Independent	Régent Millette	3,474	4.41
Total valid votes		78,819	100

== Lévis ==
Candidate	Vote	%
Danielle Roy Marinelli	19,529	
Mathieu Castonguay		
Jean Garon (inc.)		
Gilles Lehouillier		

== Longueuil ==
Mayor of Longueuil
Candidate	Party	Vote	%
Claude Gladu	Parti municipal Rive-Sud	40,384	64.2%
Claude Lamoureux	Ralliement Longueuil	22,502	35.8%
Total valid votes		62,886	100%

== Montreal ==
2005 Montreal municipal election: Mayor of Montreal
Party	Candidate	Votes	%
Montreal Island Citizens Union	(x)Gérald Tremblay	202,302	53.73
Vision Montreal	Pierre Bourque	136,769	36.32
Projet Montréal	Richard Bergeron	32,126	8.53
White Elephant Party	Michel Bédard	5,329	1.42
Total valid votes		376,526	100

== Nicolet ==
Council

Hélène Langis was elected as the councillor for Nicolet's sixth ward. She later resigned, and a by-election was held to choose her replacement on December 17, 2006:

Candidate	Vote	%
Denis Jutras	838	54.03
André Breton	359	23.15
Hélène Gelinas	294	18.96
Serge Goyette	37	2.39
Simonne Lizotte	23	1.48
Total valid votes	1,551	100

== Québec ==
Candidate	Party	Vote	%
Andrée Boucher	Independent	90,079	46.3 / 100.0
Claude Larose	Renouveau municipal de Québec	65,192	33.5 / 100.0
Marc Bellemare	Vision Québec	20,441	10.5 / 100.0
Pierre-Michel Bouchard	Action civique de Québec	17,010	8.8 / 100.0
Patrice Fortin	Independent	1,626	0.8 / 100.0

== Repentigny ==
Candidate	Vote	%
Chantal Deschamps (inc.)	13,212	57.8
Michel Carignan	9,663	42.2

== Rimouski ==
Candidate	Vote	%
Éric Forest	X	
Martin Poirier		
François Thibodeau		

== Rouyn-Noranda ==
Candidate	Vote	%
Roger Caouette	X	
Jean-Claude Beauchemin (inc.)		

== Saguenay ==
Candidate	Vote	%
Jean Tremblay (inc.)	45,081	71.4
Mereille Jean	16,740	26.5
André Reid	1,295	2.1

== Saint-Eustache ==
Candidate	Vote	%
Claude Carignan	11,635	80.6
Lucien Vallée	2,803	19.4

== Saint-Hyacinthe ==
Candidate	Vote	%
Claude Bernier (inc.)	12,040	80.8
Dale Daigneault-Denio	2,853	19.2

== Saint-Jean-sur-Richelieu ==
Candidate	Vote	%
Gilles Dolbec (inc.)	14,982	61.0
Lucille Méthé	9,572	39.0

== Saint-Jérôme ==
Candidate	Vote	%
Marc Gascon (inc.)	11,026	74.3
Gérald Cyr	3,822	25.7

== Salaberry-de-Valleyfield ==
Candidate	Vote	%
Denis Lapointe (inc.)	8,833	71.1
Sylvain Guérin	3,591	28.9

== Shawinigan ==
Candidate	Vote	%
Lise Landry (inc.)	11,396	52.2
Renée Fournier	6,789	31.1
Maxime Boisvert	3,327	15.3

== Sherbrooke ==
Candidate	Vote	%
Jean Perrault (inc.)	25,687	53.9
Hélène Gravel	20,892	43.9
Hubert Richard	1,047	2.2

== Terrebonne ==
Candidate	Vote	%
Jean-Marc Robitaille (inc.)	Acclaimed	

== Trois-Rivières ==
Candidate	Vote	%
Yves Lévesque (inc.)	34,298	70.3
Guy Julien	13,741	28.2
Serge Simard	754	1.5

== Victoriaville ==
Candidate	Vote	%
Roger Richard (inc.)	Acclaimed	

== All results by region ==
- Quebec municipal elections, 2005, results in Bas-Saint-Laurent
- Quebec municipal elections, 2005, results in Capitale-Nationale
- Quebec municipal elections, 2005, results in Centre-du-Québec
- Quebec municipal elections, 2005, results in Chaudière-Appalaches
- Quebec municipal elections, 2005, results in Côte-Nord
- Quebec municipal elections, 2005, results in Estrie
- Quebec municipal elections, 2005, results in Gaspésie-Îles-de-la-Madeleine
- Quebec municipal elections, 2005, results in Lanaudière
- Quebec municipal elections, 2005, results in Laurentides
- Quebec municipal elections, 2005, results in Laval
- Quebec municipal elections, 2005, results in Mauricie
- Quebec municipal elections, 2005, results in Montréal
- Quebec municipal elections, 2005, results in Montérégie
- Quebec municipal elections, 2005, results in Nord-du-Québec
- Quebec municipal elections, 2005, results in Outaouais
- Quebec municipal elections, 2005, results in Saguenay-Lac-Saint-Jean

== See also ==
- Municipal elections in Canada
- Electronic voting in Canada
- 2006 Quebec municipal elections

== Sources ==
- MAMR
- PG Elections
