= Ralph Mercier =

Canadian politician (1937–2020)

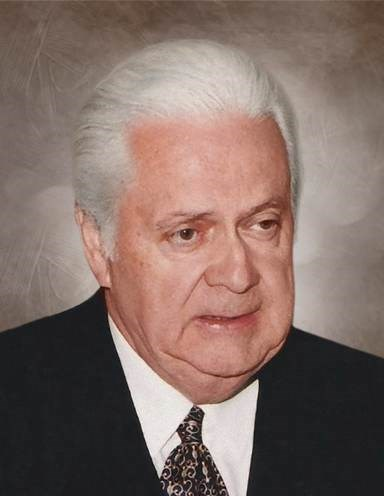
- Born: Joseph Harold Ralph Mercier; 13 February 1937; Quebec City, Quebec, Canada
- Died: 13 February 2020 (aged 83); Quebec City, Quebec, Canada
- Occupation: Politician
- Relatives: Éric Mercier (son)

Joseph Harold Ralph Mercier (13 February 1937 – 13 February 2020) was a Canadian municipal politician. He served as Mayor of Charlesbourg from 1984 to 2001, then held other positions in Quebec City from 2002 to 2009.

== Biography ==
As Mayor of Charlesbourg, Mercier fought against municipal reorganization in Quebec City. In 2001, he was elected as a city councilor for Quebec City Council as a member of the party Action civique de Québec. He was opposition leader in the City Hall of Quebec City from 2002 to 2005. During this period, he invited residents of Quebec City to vote on referendums on demergers of the city's boroughs. However, Mercier never said whether he was for or against the mergers.

Mercier considered retirement in 2004, but ultimately decided to stand in the 2005 elections. He was reelected to the Charlesbourg-Centre district in November of that year. Mayor Andrée Boucher appointed Mercier to the executive council, the agglomeration council, the executive committee, and the board of directors.

After Boucher's death in 2007, Mercier found himself in a more disagreeable situation with the new mayor Régis Labeaume. He decided to retire from political life following the 2009 elections.

Mercier had been active in the Union Des Municipalités Du Québec (UMQ), where he served as President from 1990 to 1993. He sat on the board of directors for the UMQ as a representative of the caucus des grandes villes.

Mercier died on 13 February 2020, on his 83rd birthday.
