= 2013 Quebec municipal elections =

- November 3, 2013

The Canadian province of Quebec held municipal elections on November 3, 2013. Below are the results by region.

== Bas-Saint-Laurent ==
=== Matane ===
Mayoral candidate	Vote	%
Jérôme Landry	2,269	42.91
France Caron	1,930	36.50
Steven Grant	744	14.07
Stéfany Pelletier	345	6.52

=== Rimouski ===
Mayoral candidate	Vote	%
Éric Forest (X)	Acclaimed	

=== Rivière-du-Loup ===
Mayoral candidate	Vote	%
Gaétan Gamache	3,002	41.41
Amélie Dionne	2,166	29.88
Michel Jones	1,461	20.15
Gaétan Frenette	621	8.57

== Saguenay–Lac-Saint-Jean ==
=== Alma ===
Mayoral candidate	Vote	%
Marc Asselin (X)	7,774	66.07
Jean Paradis	3,852	32.74
Laval Hudon	140	1.19

=== Dolbeau-Mistassini ===
Mayoral candidate	Vote	%
Richard Hébert (X)	4,211	67.03
Maurice Sénéchal	2,071	32.97

=== Roberval ===
Mayoral candidate	Vote	%
Guy Larouche	2,388	50.24
Michel Larouche (X)	2,284	48.05
Francis Vallée	81	1.70

=== Saguenay ===
Party	Mayoral candidate	Vote	%
Independent	Jean Tremblay (X)	41,028	63.04
Équipe Paul Grimard - Équipe du renouveau démocratique	Paul Grimard	24,050	36.96

== Capitale-Nationale ==
=== L'Ancienne-Lorette ===
Party	Mayoral candidate	Vote	%
Équipe Loranger	Émile Loranger (X)	4,247	54.41
Renouveau lorettain	Yvan Dussault	2,054	26.32
Regroupement des payeurs de taxes de L'Ancienne-Lorette	Alain Fortin	832	10.66
Independent	Steve Martineau	672	8.61

=== Quebec City ===
Party	Mayoral candidate	Vote	%
Équipe Labeaume	Régis Labeaume (X)	161,216	74.07
Démocratie Québec	David Lemelin	52,293	24.03
Independent	Claude Gagnon	2,058	0.95
Independent	Denis Haché	1,077	0.49
Independent	Armand Paré	999	0.46

=== Saint-Augustin-de-Desmaures ===
Party	Mayoral candidate	Vote	%
Horizon Saint-Augustin - Équipe Marcel Corriveau	Marcel Corriveau (X)	Acclaimed	

== Mauricie ==
=== La Tuque ===
Mayoral candidate	Vote	%
Normand Beaudoin (X)	3,043	55.09
Line Pilote	2,481	44.91

=== Shawinigan ===
Mayoral candidate	Vote	%
Michel Angers (X)	15,180	76.90
Yves Gélinas	4,220	21.38
Ronald St-Onge Lynch	339	1.72

=== Trois-Rivières ===
Party	Mayoral candidate	Vote	%
Independent	Yves Lévesque (X)	29,204	49.25
Independent	Sylvie Tardif	18,491	31.18
Independent	Catherine Dufresne	8,324	14.04
Independent	Marcelle Girard	1,609	2.71
Force 3R	Richard St-Germain	1,321	2.23
Independent	Pierre Benoit Fortin	352	0.59

== Estrie ==
=== Coaticook ===
Mayoral candidate	Vote	%
Bertrand Lamoureux (X)	Acclaimed	

=== Magog ===
Mayoral candidate	Vote	%
Vicki May Hamm (X)	5,106	45.48
Michel Bombardier	3,078	27.42
Robert Mabit	2,689	23.95
Perle Bouchard	354	3.15

=== Sherbrooke ===
Results by district

Party	Mayoral candidate	Vote	%
Équipe Bernard Sévigny - Renouveau sherbrookois	Bernard Sévigny (X)	35,246	73.39
Independent	Denis Pallerin	6,854	14.27
Independent	Roy Patterson	3,104	6.46
Comme une eau Terre	Hubert Richard	2,824	5.88

== Montréal ==
=== Baie-D'Urfé ===
Mayoral candidate	Vote	%
Maria Tutino (X)	1,147	75.26
Jacques Lorrain	377	24.74

=== Beaconsfield ===
Mayoral candidate	Vote	%
George Bourelle	2,824	43.48
Rhonda Massad	2,565	39.49
James Bonnell	668	10.28
Hela Labene	438	6.74

=== Côte-Saint-Luc ===
Mayoral candidate	Vote	%
Anthony Housefather (X)	Acclaimed	

=== Dollard-des-Ormeaux ===
Mayoral candidate	Vote	%
Edward Janiszewski (X)	Acclaimed	

=== Dorval ===
Party	Mayoral candidate	Vote	%
Équipe Action Dorval Action Team	Edgar Rouleau (X)	4,012	85.80
Independent	Marc Barrette	664	14.20

=== Hampstead ===
Mayoral candidate	Vote	%
William Steinberg (X)	1,321	61.21
Bonnie Feigenbaum	837	38.79

=== Kirkland ===
Mayoral candidate	Vote	%
Michel Gibson	3,365	49.90
John W. Meaney	2,994	44.40
Daniel La Tour	385	5.71

=== L'Île-Dorval ===
Mayoral candidate	Vote	%
Gisèle Chapleau (X)	Acclaimed	

=== Montréal-Est ===
Party	Mayoral candidate	Vote	%
Équipe Coutu	Robert Coutu (X)	827	52.11
Option Action Citoyens de Montréal-Est	Daniel Fournier	561	35.35
Independent	Claude Marcoux	199	12.54

=== Montreal West ===
Mayoral candidate	Vote	%
Beny Masella (X)	1,184	61.44
Asher Waldman	613	31.81
Simon Phillipson	130	6.75

=== Mount Royal ===
Party	Mayoral candidate	Vote	%
Action Mont-Royal	Philippe Roy (X)	Acclaimed	

=== Pointe-Claire ===
Mayoral candidate	Vote	%
Morris Trudeau	5,376	53.36
John Belvedere	4,699	46.64

=== Sainte-Anne-de-Bellevue ===
Mayoral candidate	Vote	%
Paola L. Hawa	1,082	53.99
Paul Chablo	922	46.01

=== Senneville ===
Mayoral candidate	Vote	%
Jane (Foukal) Guest	282	52.32
George McLeish (X)	257	47.68

=== Westmount ===
Mayoral candidate	Vote	%
Peter Trent (X)	Acclaimed	

== Outaouais ==
=== Gatineau ===
Party	Mayoral candidate	Vote	%
Action Gatineau	Maxime Pedneaud-Jobin	40,991	52.62
Independent	Marc Bureau (X)	28,146	36.13
Independent	Jacques Lemay	7,492	9.62
Independent	François P. D'Aoust	1,266	1.63

== Abitibi-Témiscamingue ==
=== Amos ===
Mayoral candidate	Vote	%
Ulrick Chérubin (X)	3,635	72.85
Eric Mathieu	1.355	27.15

=== Rouyn-Noranda ===
Party	Mayoral candidate	Vote	%
Équipe Mario Provencher	Mario Provencher (X)	8,706	80.05
Independent	Vuyani Gxoyiya	1,566	14.40
Independent	Richard St-Michel	604	5.55

=== Val-d'Or ===
Mayoral candidate	Vote	%
Pierre Corbeil	6,488	58.37
Céline Gaudet	2,736	24.62
Marcel Jolicoeur	1,597	14.37
Dominic Bernatchez	198	1.78
Raynald Trahan	96	0.86

== Côte-Nord ==
=== Baie-Comeau ===
Mayoral candidate	Vote	%
Paul Joncas	4,730	55.86
Claude Martel	3,738	44.14

=== Sept-Îles ===
Mayoral candidate	Vote	%
Jonathan Martel	3,090	28.27
Réjean Porlier	3,203	29.31
Rodrigue Vigneault	2,891	26.45
Martial Lévesque	1,554	14.22
Linda Lachance	191	1.75

== Nord-du-Québec ==
=== Chibougamau ===
Mayoral candidate	Vote	%
Manon Cyr (X)	Acclaimed	

== Gaspésie–Îles-de-la-Madeleine ==
=== Gaspé ===
Mayoral candidate	Vote	%
Daniel Côté	3,812	58.86
Mélissa Plourde	2,549	25.43
Cowboy Jay	115	1.78

=== Les Îles-de-la-Madeleine ===
Mayoral candidate	Vote	%
Jonathan Lapierre	3,405	48.30
Joël Arseneau (X)	2,032	28.82
Nicolas Arseneau	1,425	25.21
Léonard Chevrier	135	1.91
Yvon Cyr	53	0.75

== Chaudière-Appalaches ==
=== Beauceville ===
Mayoral candidate	Vote	%
Luc Provençal (X)	Acclaimed	

=== Lévis ===
Party	Mayoral candidate	Vote	%
Lévis Force 10 - Équipe Lehouillier	Gilles Lehouillier	19,254	38.91
Independent	Isabelle Demers	16,907	34.17
Renouveau Lévis	Antoine Dubé	8,118	16.41
Action Lévis	André Jean	2,596	5.25
Independent	Stéphane Blais	1,931	3.90
Independent	Incroyable Luc Cauchon	677	1.37

=== Montmagny ===
Mayoral candidate	Vote	%
Jean-Guy Desrosiers (X)	2,584	49.63
Lise M. Vachon	1,377	26.45
Sébastien Clavet	1,246	23.93

=== Saint-Georges ===
Party	Mayoral candidate	Vote	%
Independent	Claude Morin	6,476	56.99
Rassemblement Saint-Georges	Marcel Drouin	4,887	43.01

=== Thetford Mines ===
Mayoral candidate	Vote	%
Marc-Alexandre Brousseau	6,091	48.35
Jean-Pierre Huot	3,915	31.08
Louis-Philippe Champagne	1,396	11.08
Marc F. Vachon	1,196	9.49

== Laval ==
Party	Mayoral candidate	Vote	%
Mouvement lavallois	Marc Demers	51,151	44.19
Action Laval	Jean Claude Gobé	28,130	24.30
Option Laval	Claire Le Bel	14,356	12.40
Parti au service du citoyen	Robert Bordeleau	12,574	10.86
Independent	Jacques Foucher	3,678	3.18
Independent	Hélène Goupil Nantel	2,361	2.04
Nouveau Parti des Lavallois	Guy Landry	1,453	1.26
Independent	Marc-Aurèle Racicot	1,451	1.25
Independent	Régent Millette	611	0.53
Total valid votes		115,765	100

== Lanaudière ==
=== Joliette ===
Mayoral candidate	Vote	%
Alain Beaudry	3,931	71.56
Guy St-Jean	1,562	28.44

=== L'Assomption ===
Party	Mayoral candidate	Vote	%
Union des citoyens de L'Assomption	Jean-Claude Gingras	3,703	49.49
Independent	Gilbert Gagnon	2,633	35.19
L'Assomption - Pour vous	Louise T. Francoeur (X)	1,146	15.32

=== Lavaltrie ===
Party	Mayoral candidate	Vote	%
Parti lavaltrois	Jean Claude Gravel (X)	1,832	39.74
Independent	Norman Blackburn	1,665	36.12
Independent	Robert Pellerin	1,113	24.14

=== Mascouche ===
Party	Mayoral candidate	Vote	%
Vision démocratique de Mascouche - Équipe Guillaume Tremblay	Guillaume Tremblay	9,438	53.70
Équipe Luc Thériault	Luc Thériault	6,296	35.82
Independent	Pierre Nevraumont	1,842	10.48

=== Repentigny ===
Party	Mayoral candidate	Vote	%
Équipe Deschamps	Chantal Deschamps (X)	18,234	62.30
Parti démocratique de Repentigny-Le Gardeur - Équipe Jean Langlois	Jean Langlois	11,036	37.70

=== Saint-Charles-Borromée ===
Mayoral candidate	Vote	%
André Hénault (X)	3,533	89.08
Richard Simoneau	433	10.92

=== Saint-Lin–Laurentides ===
Party	Mayoral candidate	Vote	%
Avenir citoyen - Équipe Patrick Massé	Patrick Massé	3,149	58.12
Parti choisir le changement maintenant	Michel Leduc	1,525	28.15
Independent	Robert Jobin	447	8.25
Independent	Walter Murphy	297	5.48

=== Terrebonne ===
Party	Mayoral candidate	Vote	%
Équipe Robitaille	Jean-Marc Robitaille (X)	17,743	62.40
Renouveau Terrebonne	Antoine Hanachian	10,692	37.60

== Laurentides ==
=== Blainville ===
Party	Mayoral candidate	Vote	%
Vrai Blainville - Équipe Perreault	Richard Perreault	10,471	58.90
Mouvement Blainville - Équipe Florent Gravel	Florent Gravel	7,307	41.10

=== Boisbriand ===
Party	Mayoral candidate	Vote	%
Ralliement des citoyens de Boisbriand	Marlene Cordato (X)	5,062	52.58
Independent	Robert Frégeau	2,317	24.07
Action citoyenne de Boisbriand - Équipe Drapeau	Martin Drapeau	1,212	12.59
Independent	Sylvain Labelle	1,036	10.76

=== Deux-Montagnes ===
Party	Mayoral candidate	Vote	%
Deux-Montagnes autrement - Équipe Denis Martin Team	Denis Martin	2,738	45.78
Équipe Denis Joannette Team	Denis Joannette	2,070	34.61
Independent	Jamshid Ghavami	929	15.53
Independent	Eddy Johnson	244	4.08

=== Grenville-sur-la-Rouge ===
Party	Mayoral candidate	Vote	%
Independent	John Saywell	960	78.82
Independent	Diane Monette	258	21.16

=== Mirabel ===
Party	Mayoral candidate	Vote	%
Action Mirabel - Équipe Bouchard	Jean Bouchard	7,632	61.86
Independent	Luc St-Jean	2,945	23.87
Independent	René Plouffe	949	7.69
Independent	Félix Daoust	812	6.58

=== Mont-Laurier ===
Mayoral candidate	Vote	%
Michel Adrien (X)	2,974	67.21
Serge Lebeau	779	17.60
Karl Bénard	394	8.90
Vincent Bousquet	278	6.28

=== Rosemère ===
Party	Mayoral candidate	Vote	%
Équipe Leduc / Leduc Team	Madeleine Leduc	1,955	37.10
Équipe Team Roussel Rosemère	Pierre Roussel	1,240	23.53
Équipe innove-action - Team Rosemère	Melissa Monk	1,180	22.39
Équipe Arsenault / Arsenault Team	Sylvain Arsenault	895	16.98

=== Sainte-Anne-des-Plaines ===
Party	Mayoral candidate	Vote	%
Parti Vision Action	Guy Charbonneau (X)	Acclaimed	

=== Sainte-Marthe-sur-le-Lac ===
Party	Mayoral candidate	Vote	%
Nouvelle option - Équipe Paulus	Sonia Paulus (X)	4,333	78.27
Independent	Gilles Boisvert	1,203	21.73

=== Sainte-Sophie ===
Party	Mayoral candidate	Vote	%
Action Sainte-Sophie - Équipe Gallant	Louise Gallant	2,388	55.63
Parti des citoyens de Sainte-Sophie	Jacques Taillon	990	23.06
Avenir Sainte-Sophie	Patrick Langlois	915	21.31

=== Sainte-Thérèse ===
Party	Mayoral candidate	Vote	%
Parti Municipal Énergie avec Sylvie Surprenant	Sylvie Surprenant (X)	3,552	41.95
Projet citoyen - Équipe Vincent Arseneau	Vincent Arseneau	2,353	27.79
Équipe Marc Laporte	Marc Laporte	1,668	19.70
Independent	Christian Charron	895	10.57

=== Saint-Eustache ===
Party	Mayoral candidate	Vote	%
Option Saint-Eustache - Équipe Pierre Charron	Pierre Charron (X)	10,413	69.82
Independent	Denis Paré	4,502	30.18

=== Saint-Jérôme ===
Party	Mayoral candidate	Vote	%
Vision Saint-Jérôme	Stéphane Maher	8,533	38.86
Ensemble Saint-Jérôme - Équipe Martin Pigeon	Martin Pigeon	5,785	26.34
Union des citoyens - Équipe Charette	Yves Charette	4,880	22.22
Independent	Alain Langlois	2,763	12.58

== Montérégie ==
=== Acton Vale ===
Mayoral candidate	Vote	%
Éric Charbonneau (X)	Acclaimed	

=== Beloeil ===
Party	Mayoral candidate	Vote	%
Équipe Diane Lavoie - Beloeil gagnant	Diane Lavoie (X)	4,343	60.39
Parti des citoyens de Beloeil - Équipe Rémi Landry	Rémi Landry	2,848	39.61

=== Boucherville ===
==== Mayor ====
Party	Mayoral candidate	Vote	%
Option Citoyens Citoyennes	Jean Martel (X)	13,766	81.85
Independent	Francine Crevier Bélair	3,052	18.15

==== Boucherville City Council ====
District 1 (Marie-Victorin) Councillor

Party	Mayoral candidate	Vote
Équipe Jean Martel - Option Citoyens Citoyennes	Yan S. Laquerre (Inc.)	1,954
Independent	Monique Reeves	221
Independent	Simon Collette	207

District 2 (Rivière-aux-Pins) Councillor

Party	Mayoral candidate	Vote
Équipe Jean Martel - Option Citoyens Citoyennes	Raouf Absi (Inc.)	1,541
Independent	Michaël Léveillée	781

District 3 (Des Découvreurs) Councillor

Party	Mayoral candidate	Vote
Équipe Jean Martel - Option Citoyens Citoyennes	Alexandra Capone (Inc.)	1,704
Independent	Marc Lapointe	500

District 4 (Harmonie) Councillor

Party	Mayoral candidate	Vote
Équipe Jean Martel - Option Citoyens Citoyennes	Anne Barabé (Inc.)	1,556
Independent	Carl Chevalier	728

District 5 (La Seigneurie) Councillor

Party	Mayoral candidate	Vote
Équipe Jean Martel - Option Citoyens Citoyennes	Dominic Lévesque (Inc.)	1,479
Independent	Michel Dufresne	371

District 6 (Saint-Louis) Councillor

Party	Mayoral candidate	Vote
Équipe Jean Martel - Option Citoyens Citoyennes	Magalie Queval (Inc.)	1,600
Independent	Julie Naud	513

District 7 (De Normandie) Councillor

Party	Mayoral candidate	Vote
Équipe Jean Martel - Option Citoyens Citoyennes	Jacqueline Boubane (Inc.)	1,554
Independent	Francine Guidi	506

District 8 (Du Boisé) Councillor

Party	Mayoral candidate	Vote
Équipe Jean Martel - Option Citoyens Citoyennes	Lise Roy (Inc.)	1,239
Independent	Jacques Larose	384

=== Bromont ===
Mayoral candidate	Vote	%
Pauline Quinlan (X)	Acclaimed	

=== Brossard ===
Party	Mayoral candidate	Vote	%
Priority Brossard	Paul Leduc (X)	12,929	65.25
Brossard Revival	Louis Lemoine	6,887	34.75
Total valid votes		19,816	100

=== Candiac ===
Party	Mayoral candidate	Vote	%
Équipe action Candiac	Normand Dyotte (X)	Acclaimed	

=== Chambly ===
Party	Mayoral candidate	Vote	%
Action Chambly - Équipe Denis Lavoie	Denis Lavoie (X)	4,648	53.75
Independent	Steeves Demers	4,000	46.25

=== Châteauguay ===
Party	Mayoral candidate	Vote	%
Action citoyenne/Citizens' Action - Équipe Nathalie Simon	Nathalie Simon (X)	9,476	62.69
Independent	Steve Brisebois	5,640	37.31

=== Cowansville ===
Mayoral candidate	Vote	%
Arthur Fauteux (X)	3,175	71.78
Guy Patenaude	1,248	28.22

=== Granby ===
Mayoral candidate	Vote	%
Pascal Bonin	11,391	44.29
Richard Goulet (X)	9,748	37.90
Éliette Jenneau	2,776	10.79
Louise Bruneau	984	3.83
Denny O'Breham	590	2.29
Carl Bouvier	230	0.89

=== Huntingdon ===
Mayoral candidate	Vote	%
André Brunette	605	60.87
Joffre L'Heureux	207	20.82
Jean Pierre Guay	159	16.00
Robert Lalonde	23	2.31

=== La Prairie ===
Party	Mayoral candidate	Vote	%
Parti de l'équipe Lucie Roussel	Lucie Roussel (X)	Acclaimed	

=== Longueuil ===
Party	Mayoral candidate	Vote	%
Action Longueuil	Caroline St-Hilaire (X)	50,088	87.30
Independent	Pardo Chiocchio	7,285	12.70

=== Mont-Saint-Hilaire ===
Party	Mayoral candidate	Vote	%
Avenir hilairemontais - Équipe Yves Corriveau	Yves Corriveau	2,236	33.69
Voix citoyenne - Équipe Denise Loiselle	Denise Loiselle	1,731	26.08
Independent	Carole Blouin	1,389	20.93
Independent	Valéry Lapointe	1,280	19.29

=== Pincourt ===
Mayoral candidate	Vote	%
Yvan Cardinal (X)	2,387	63.33
Stéphane Boyer	1,382	36.67

=== Saint-Basile-le-Grand ===
Party	Mayoral candidate	Vote	%
Parti grandbasilois	Bernard Gagnon (X)	4,294	80.88
Independent	Jonathan Bouchard	1,015	19.12

=== Saint-Bruno-de-Montarville ===
Party	Mayoral candidate	Vote	%
Parti montarvillois	Martin Murray	5,207	44.62
Alliance municipale de Saint-Bruno-de-Montarville	Joël Boucher	4,845	41.52
Independent	Pierre Filion	1,618	13.86

=== Saint-Constant ===
Party	Mayoral candidate	Vote	%
Parti du vrai changement - Équipe Jean-Claude Boyer	Jean-Claude Boyer	4,035	37.44
Parti des citoyens - Équipe Guy Brault	Guy Brault	3,895	36.14
Équipe Gilles Pépin - Action municipale Saint-Constant	Gilles Pépin (X)	2,252	20.89
Independent	Yves-André Ferland	547	5.08
Independent	Michel Vachon	49	0.45

=== Sainte-Catherine ===
Party	Mayoral candidate	Vote	%
Parti de l'équipe Bates	Jocelyne Bates (X)	3,082	75.41
Independent	Rosaire Lamarche	1,005	24.59

=== Sainte-Julie ===
Party	Mayoral candidate	Vote	%
La voix des citoyens - Équipe Suzanne Roy	Suzanne Roy (X)	Acclaimed	

=== Saint-Hyacinthe ===
Mayoral candidate	Vote	%
Claude Corbeil	9,416	50.92
Gaston Vachon	4,702	25.43
Pierre Rhéaume	4,374	23.65

=== Saint-Jean-sur-Richelieu ===
Party	Mayoral candidate	Vote	%
Parti Fecteau	Michel Fecteau	7,693	21.85
Avec Bachand	Claude Bachand	7,104	20.18
Équipe Alain Laplante	Alain Laplante	6,817	19.36
Vision Legrand	Stéphane Legrand	6,445	18.31
Action civique	Jean Lamoureux	2,879	8.18
Équipe Paradis	Alain Paradis	1,945	5.52
Independent	Khaled Kalille	1,789	5.08
Independent	Michel Gauthier	449	1.28
Independent	Paul Turcotte	86	0.24

=== Saint-Lambert ===
Mayoral candidate	Vote	%
Alain Dépatie	5,282	68.61
Philippe Brunet (X)	2,417	31.39

=== Saint-Lazare ===
Party	Mayoral candidate	Vote	%
Independent	Robert Grimaudo (X)	2,786	60.07
Alliance Saint-Lazare	Michel Lambert	1,852	39.93

=== Salaberry-de-Valleyfield ===
Mayoral candidate	Vote	%
Denis Lapointe (X)	9,352	63.49
Robert Savard	5,378	36.51

=== Sorel-Tracy ===
Party	Mayoral candidate	Vote	%
Independent	Serge Péloquin	8,513	50.30
Independent	Réjean Dauplaise (X)	2,012	11.89
Parti d'aujourd'hui - Équipe Corina Bastiani	Corina Bastiani	1,825	10.78
Independent	Gilles Lemieux	1,698	10.03
Independent	Jean Tremblay	1,649	9.74
Independent	Michèle Lacombe Gauthier	730	4.31
Independent	André Mandeville	497	2.94

=== Varennes ===
Party	Mayoral candidate	Vote	%
Parti durable - Équipe Damphousse	Martin Damphousse (X)	6,979	80.15
Regroupement des candidats de quartier	Yves Tremblay	1,728	19.85

=== Vaudreuil-Dorion ===
Party	Mayoral candidate	Vote	%
Parti de l'action de Vaudreuil-Dorion	Guy Pilon (X)	5,590	84.28
Independent	Mario Tanguay	1,043	15.72

== Centre-du-Québec ==
=== Bécancour ===
Mayoral candidate	Vote	%
Jean-Guy Dubois	3,184	54.92
Karl Grondin	2,614	45.08

=== Drummondville ===
Mayoral candidate	Vote	%
Alexandre Cusson	15,042	74.52
Camille Desmarais	5,144	25.48

=== Victoriaville ===
Mayoral candidate	Vote	%
Alain Rayes (X)	Acclaimed	

==== February 21, 2016 by-election ====
Mayoral candidate	Vote	%
André Bellavance	9,219	75.28
André Guillemette	1,522	12.43
Gilles Lafontaine	1,270	10.37
Simon Roux	235	1.92

== See also ==
- Municipal elections in Canada
- Electronic voting in Canada
- 2005 Quebec municipal elections
- 2006 Quebec municipal elections
- 2009 Quebec municipal elections
