= Martine Beaugrand =

Canadian politician (1961–2024)

7th Mayor of Laval
- In office July 3, 2013 – November 2013
- Preceded by: Basile Angelopoulos (acting); Alexandre Duplessis
- Succeeded by: Marc Demers

Laval City Councillor for District 20 (Fabreville)
- In office 2009 – July 3, 2013
- Preceded by: André Boileau
- Succeeded by: Vacant

Personal details
- Born: March 15, 1961
- Died: July 9, 2024 (aged 63)
- Party: Parti PRO des Lavallois → independent

Martine Beaugrand (French pronunciation: [maʁtin boɡʁɑ̃]; March 15, 1961 – July 9, 2024) was a Canadian politician, who was acclaimed as the new interim mayor of Laval, Quebec on July 3, 2013 following the resignation of Alexandre Duplessis. She was the city's first female mayor.

Beaugrand was first elected to Laval City Council in the 2009 municipal election, representing the Fabreville ward as a member of the Parti PRO des Lavallois, and sat as an independent councillor from the time of the party's dissolution in 2012. She was one of only two city councillors, along with France Dubreuil, who was not alleged to have been involved in the municipal corruption scandal that has affected the city since the resignation of Gilles Vaillancourt in 2012.

She did not run for another term in the 2013 municipal election.

Beaugrand died on July 9, 2024, at the age of 63.
