= 1993 Laval municipal election =

Election in Quebec, Canada

The 1993 Laval municipal election took place on November 7, 1993, to elect a mayor and city councillors in Laval, Quebec. Gilles Vaillancourt was elected to a second term as mayor, and his municipal party won all but one seat on city council.

== Results ==
1993 Laval municipal election: Mayor of Laval
Party	Candidate	Votes	%
PRO Laval	(x)Gilles Vaillancourt	68,939	60.81
Option Laval	Jean Rizzuto	26,456	23.34
Parti Lavallois	Serge Tremblay	16,878	14.89
Independent	Rick Blatter	1,087	0.96
Total valid votes		113,360	100

1993 Laval election, Councillor, District One
Party	Candidate	Total votes	% of total votes
PRO Laval	Jacques St-Jean	3,191	60.90
Option Laval	Paul St-Jacques	1,291	24.64
Parti Lavallois	Tolentin Leblanc	758	14.47
Total valid votes		5,240	100.00

1993 Laval election, Councillor, District Two
Party	Candidate	Total votes	% of total votes
PRO Laval	Andre Gervais	3,053	70.97
Option Laval	Lois Parent	926	21.52
Parti Lavallois	Henri-Yves Philippe	323	7.51
Total valid votes		4,302	100.00

1993 Laval election, Councillor, District Three
Party	Candidate	Total votes	% of total votes
Independent	Maurice Clermont	3,662	81.00
PRO Laval	Maryse D'Arcy	536	11.86
Option Laval	Lucie Rivest	323	7.14
Total valid votes		4,521	100.00

1993 Laval election, Councillor, District Four
Party	Candidate	Total votes	% of total votes
PRO Laval	Monique Gauthier	2,677	56.42
Option Laval	Marjolaine Vallee	1,326	27.95
Parti Lavallois	Annibale Palermo	742	15.64
Total valid votes		4,745	100.00

1993 Laval election, Councillor, District Five
Party	Candidate	Total votes	% of total votes
PRO Laval	Georges Gauthier	2,821	61.45
Option Laval	Marianne Leclerc	1,055	22.98
Parti Lavallois	Bernard Diotte	715	15.57
Total valid votes		4,591	100.00

1993 Laval election, Councillor, District Six
Party	Candidate	Total votes	% of total votes
PRO Laval	Jean-Jacques Lapierre	2,449	62.49
Option Laval	Henri Petit	819	20.90
Parti Lavallois	Marie Nicolo	651	16.61
Total valid votes		3,919	100.00

1993 Laval election, Councillor, District Seven
Party	Candidate	Total votes	% of total votes
PRO Laval	Georges Gagne	2,438	71.43
Option Laval	Ludovico Aristo	549	16.09
Parti Lavallois	Andre Harpin	426	12.48
Total valid votes		3,413	100.00

1993 Laval election, Councillor, District Eight
Party	Candidate	Total votes	% of total votes
PRO Laval	Micheline Hamel	2,079	47.94
Option Laval	Nancy Lemay	1,174	27.07
Parti Lavallois	Jules Saucier	1,084	24.99
Total valid votes		4,337	100.00

1993 Laval election, Councillor, District Nine
Party	Candidate	Total votes	% of total votes
PRO Laval	Yves Gratton	2,646	55.93
Option Laval	Raymond Lavoie	1,493	31.56
Parti Lavallois	Laurent Gierula	592	12.51
Total valid votes		4,731	100.00

1993 Laval election, Councillor, District Ten
Party	Candidate	Total votes	% of total votes
PRO Laval	Jocelyne Guertin	3,006	74.46
Option Laval	Paul Lussier	696	17.24
Parti Lavallois	Shalan Keushguerian	335	8.30
Total valid votes		4,037	100.00

1993 Laval election, Councillor, District Eleven
Party	Candidate	Total votes	% of total votes
PRO Laval	Michelle Major	2,677	60.77
Option Laval	Marc Bordeleau	850	19.30
Parti Lavallois	Robert Bordeleau	518	11.76
Independent	Yan Therien	360	8.17
Total valid votes		4,405	100.00

1993 Laval election, Councillor, District Twelve
Party	Candidate	Total votes	% of total votes
PRO Laval	Pierrette Patenaude	2,327	67.12
Option Laval	Richard Morin	852	24.57
Parti Lavallois	Alain Bordeleau	288	8.31
Total valid votes		3,467	100.00

1993 Laval election, Councillor, District Thirteen
Party	Candidate	Total votes	% of total votes
PRO Laval	Richard Lagrois	2,911	62.48
Option Laval	Mario Leonard	1,101	23.63
Parti Lavallois	Ghislaine Tessier	647	13.89
Total valid votes		4,659	100.00

1993 Laval election, Councillor, District Fourteen
Party	Candidate	Total votes	% of total votes
PRO Laval	Savas Fortis	2,646	58.85
Option Laval	George Giagkos	1,102	24.51
Parti Lavallois	Maria Papamaniodis	748	16.64
Total valid votes		4,496	100.00

1993 Laval election, Councillor, District Fifteen
Party	Candidate	Total votes	% of total votes
PRO Laval	Richard Goyer	2,732	58.63
Option Laval	Christine Labelle	1,317	28.26
Parti Lavallois	Lorraine Lachance	611	13.11
Total valid votes		4,660	100.00

1993 Laval election, Councillor, District Sixteen
Party	Candidate	Total votes	% of total votes
PRO Laval	Pierre Cleroux	3,132	57.09
Option Laval	Martial Fortin	1,412	25.74
Parti Lavallois	Yvon Dore	942	17.17
Total valid votes		5,486	100.00

1993 Laval election, Councillor, District Seventeen
Party	Candidate	Total votes	% of total votes
PRO Laval	Jean-Jacques Beldiee	2,686	57.12
Option Laval	Serge Gauthier	1,074	22.84
Parti Lavallois	Pierrette Labelle	942	20.03
Total valid votes		4,702	100.00

1993 Laval election, Councillor, District Eighteen
Party	Candidate	Total votes	% of total votes
PRO Laval	Robert Plante	3,401	64.04
Option Laval	Marie-Josee Bonin	1,113	20.96
Parti Lavallois	Mariette Cossette	797	15.01
Total valid votes		5,311	100.00

1993 Laval election, Councillor, District Nineteen
Party	Candidate	Total votes	% of total votes
PRO Laval	Andre Boileau	4,027	74.55
Option Laval	Colette Boutin	892	16.51
Parti Lavallois	Robert Dumas	483	8.94
Total valid votes		5,402	100.00

1993 Laval election, Councillor, District Twenty
Party	Candidate	Total votes	% of total votes
PRO Laval	Robert Masseau	2,744	55.43
Option Laval	Stephane Pothier	1,740	35.15
Parti Lavallois	Yves Pelletier	466	9.41
Total valid votes		4,950	100.00

1993 Laval election, Councillor, District Twenty-One
Party	Candidate	Total votes	% of total votes
PRO Laval	Guy Cyr	3,187	61.87
Option Laval	France Prince	1,319	25.61
Parti Lavallois	Christiane Aubert	645	12.52
Total valid votes		5,151	100.00

1993 Laval election, Councillor, District Twenty-Two
Party	Candidate	Total votes	% of total votes
PRO Laval	Denis Goulet	2,613	47.38
Option Laval	Gerard Jalbert	1,747	31.68
Parti Lavallois	Luc Drolet	1,155	20.94
Total valid votes		5,515	100.00

1993 Laval election, Councillor, District Twenty-Three
Party	Candidate	Total votes	% of total votes
PRO Laval	Yvon Martineau	2,957	54.83
Option Laval	Jean Filiatreault	1,534	28.44
Parti Lavallois	Therese Nozzi	902	16.73
Total valid votes		5,393	100.00

1993 Laval election, Councillor, District Twenty-Four
Party	Candidate	Total votes	% of total votes
PRO Laval	Mormand Girard	3,469	66.24
Option Laval	Gilles Lamoureux	1,100	21.00
Parti Lavallois	Michel Gauthier	552	10.54
Independent	Gilles Gauthier	116	2.22
Total valid votes		5,237	100.00

Source: "Incumbents all re-elected in Montreal East voting," Montreal Gazette, 9 November 1993, A6.
