= ACQ =

Acq or ACQ may refer to:

- Acheng District, a district of Harbin, China; see List of administrative divisions of Heilongjiang
- Acq, Pas-de-Calais, a commune in France
- ACQ-Kingdom Broadcasting Network, the broadcasting arm of a Philippine television evangelist, Apollo Quiboloy
- Action civique de Québec, a political party in Quebec City, Quebec, Canada that contests municipal elections
- Alkaline Copper Quaternary, a wood preservative
- Apollo C. Quiboloy (born 1950), Filipino religious leader and founder of Kingdom of Jesus Christ (church)
- Nuevo Continente, a defunct airline of Peru
- Ta'izzi-Adeni Arabic, a variety of Yemeni Arabic
- Waseca Municipal Airport, a public airport serving Waseca, Minnesota, US

== See also ==
- ACQuiring Knowledge in Speech, Language and Hearing, a journal published by Speech Pathology Australia
- ACQ Solomonic Builders Development Corporation, a company building the KJC King Dome in Davos City, the Philippines
- Special:PrefixIndex/ACQ
- Special:PrefixIndex/Acq
