= 2001 Laval municipal election =

The 2001 Laval municipal election took place on November 4, 2001, to elect a mayor and city councillors in Laval, Quebec.

Gilles Vaillancourt was elected to a fourth term as mayor, and his municipal party won every seat on city council.

== Results ==
=== Mayor ===
2001 Laval municipal election: Mayor of Laval
Party	Candidate	Votes	%
Parti PRO des Lavallois (Équipe Vaillancourt)	(x)Gilles Vaillancourt	72,222	57.24
Équipe Garceau	Philippe Garceau	27,100	21.48
Élan - Équipe Daniel Lefebvre	Daniel Lefebvre	26,255	20.81
Independent	Régent Millette	606	0.48
Total valid votes		126,183	100

=== Council ===
2001 Laval election, Councillor, District One
Party	Candidate	Total votes	% of total votes
Parti PRO des Lavallois	(incumbent)Jacques St-Jean	3,743	64.32
Élan - Équipe Daniel Lefebvre	Pierre Spérano	1,425	24.49
Équipe Garceau	Linda Sirois	651	11.19
Total valid votes		5,819	100.00

2001 Laval election, Councillor, District Two
Party	Candidate	Total votes	% of total votes
Parti PRO des Lavallois	Sylvie Clermont	4,217	67.12
Élan - Équipe Daniel Lefebvre	Mario Leblanc	1,568	24.96
Équipe Garceau	Gaëtan Théberge	498	7.93
Total valid votes		6,283	100.00

2001 Laval election, Councillor, District Three
Party	Candidate	Total votes	% of total votes
Parti PRO des Lavallois	Madeleine Sollazzo	3,241	52.99
Élan - Équipe Daniel Lefebvre	Normand Dupont	1,830	29.92
Équipe Garceau	Nathalie Paradis	1,045	17.09
Total valid votes		6,116	100.00

2001 Laval election, Councillor, District Four
Party	Candidate	Total votes	% of total votes
Parti PRO des Lavallois	(incumbent)Georges Gauthier	2,982	48.41
Équipe Garceau	Chantal Paradis	1,771	28.75
Élan - Équipe Daniel Lefebvre	Christiane Pichette	1,407	22.84
Total valid votes		6,160	100.00

2001 Laval election, Councillor, District Five
Party	Candidate	Total votes	% of total votes
Parti PRO des Lavallois	Francine Légaré	2,785	53.35
Élan - Équipe Daniel Lefebvre	Pierre Bédard	1,711	32.78
Équipe Garceau	Chantal Bourgault	724	13.87
Total valid votes		5,220	100.00

2001 Laval election, Councillor, District Six
Party	Candidate	Total votes	% of total votes
Parti PRO des Lavallois	(incumbent)Jean-Jacques Lapierre	2,650	52.82
Élan - Équipe Daniel Lefebvre	Solange Provencher	1,322	26.35
Équipe Garceau	Jacynte Rochon	1,045	20.83
Total valid votes		5,017	100.00

2001 Laval election, Councillor, District Seven
Party	Candidate	Total votes	% of total votes
Parti PRO des Lavallois	(incumbent)Benoit Fradet	3,393	60.88
Équipe Garceau	François Gaudreau	1,259	22.59
Élan - Équipe Daniel Lefebvre	Yves Carignan	801	14.37
Independent	Damien Pichereau	120	2.15
Total valid votes		5,573	100.00

2001 Laval election, Councillor, District Eight
Party	Candidate	Total votes	% of total votes
Parti PRO des Lavallois	(incumbent)Norman Girard	3,813	56.51
Élan - Équipe Daniel Lefebvre	Raynald Hawkins	1,592	23.59
Équipe Garceau	Jean Lambert	1,343	19.90
Total valid votes		6,748	100.00

2001 Laval election, Councillor, District Nine
Party	Candidate	Total votes	% of total votes
Parti PRO des Lavallois	Yvon Martineau	3,058	45.92
Équipe Garceau	(incumbent)Yvan Doré	2,192	32.91
Élan - Équipe Daniel Lefebvre	Danielle Paquette	1,410	21.17
Total valid votes		6,660	100.00

2001 Laval election, Councillor, District Ten
Party	Candidate	Total votes	% of total votes
Parti PRO des Lavallois	Lucie Hill Larocque	2,916	46.06
Équipe Garceau	Lisette Cormier	2,103	33.22
Élan - Équipe Daniel Lefebvre	Diane Rioux	1,312	20.72
Total valid votes		6,331	100.00

2001 Laval election, Councillor, District Eleven
Party	Candidate	Total votes	% of total votes
Parti PRO des Lavallois	(incumbent)Michelle Major	2,775	54.62
Équipe Garceau	Robert Bordeleau	1,486	29.25
Élan - Équipe Daniel Lefebvre	Réal Beauvais	820	16.14
Total valid votes		5,081	100.00

2001 Laval election, Councillor, District Twelve
Party	Candidate	Total votes	% of total votes
Parti PRO des Lavallois	(incumbent)Jocelyne Guertin	4,659	83.23
Équipe Garceau	Magdy Gammal	525	9.38
Élan - Équipe Daniel Lefebvre	Abdel Kabir Belbsir	414	7.40
Total valid votes		5,598	100.00

2001 Laval election, Councillor, District Thirteen
Party	Candidate	Total votes	% of total votes
Parti PRO des Lavallois	(incumbent)Ginette Legault Bernier	4,075	72.11
Équipe Garceau	Stéphane Patoprsty	895	15.84
Élan - Équipe Daniel Lefebvre	Patrick O'Meara	681	12.05
Total valid votes		5,651	100.00

2001 Laval election, Councillor, District Fourteen
Party	Candidate	Total votes	% of total votes
Parti PRO des Lavallois	(incumbent)Basile Angelopoulos	4,522	78.15
Équipe Garceau	Vahan Kupeyan	976	16.87
Élan - Équipe Daniel Lefebvre	Nicolas S. Shousha	288	4.98
Total valid votes		5,786	100.00

2001 Laval election, Councillor, District Fifteen
Party	Candidate	Total votes	% of total votes
Parti PRO des Lavallois	(incumbent)Richard Goyer	3,517	60.45
Équipe Garceau	Louise Boucher	1,610	27.67
Élan - Équipe Daniel Lefebvre	Véronique Allard	691	11.88
Total valid votes		5,818	100.00

2001 Laval election, Councillor, District Sixteen
Party	Candidate	Total votes	% of total votes
Parti PRO des Lavallois	(incumbent)Pierre Cléroux	3,878	58.78
Élan - Équipe Daniel Lefebvre	Jean-Pierre Dorais	1,662	25.19
Équipe Garceau	Fernand Godin	1,057	16.02
Total valid votes		6,597	100.00

2001 Laval election, Councillor, District Seventeen
Party	Candidate	Total votes	% of total votes
Parti PRO des Lavallois	(incumbent)Jean-Jacques Beldié	3,235	62.16
Élan - Équipe Daniel Lefebvre	Gérard Perrault	1,009	19.39
Équipe Garceau	Luc Hamer	960	18.45
Total valid votes		5,204	100.00

2001 Laval election, Councillor, District Eighteen
Party	Candidate	Total votes	% of total votes
Parti PRO des Lavallois	(incumbent)Robert Plante	3,022	55.20
Élan - Équipe Daniel Lefebvre	Denis Huberdeau	1,343	24.53
Équipe Garceau	Robert Poirier	1,110	20.27
Total valid votes		5,475	100.00

2001 Laval election, Councillor, District Nineteen
Party	Candidate	Total votes	% of total votes
Parti PRO des Lavallois	(incumbent)Yvon Bromley	3,048	50.29
Équipe Garceau	Danielle Dumas	1,678	27.69
Élan - Équipe Daniel Lefebvre	Robert Masseau	1,335	22.03
Total valid votes		6,061	100.00

2001 Laval election, Councillor, District Twenty
Party	Candidate	Total votes	% of total votes
Parti PRO des Lavallois	(incumbent)André Boileau	4,654	61.40
Équipe Garceau	Alexandre Jarry	1,832	24.17
Élan - Équipe Daniel Lefebvre	Daniel Lafranière	1,094	14.43
Total valid votes		7,580	100.00

2001 Laval election, Councillor, District Twenty-One
Party	Candidate	Total votes	% of total votes
Parti PRO des Lavallois	Denis Robillard	2,878	41.36
Équipe Garceau	(incumbent)Pierre D'Amico	2,667	38.32
Élan - Équipe Daniel Lefebvre	Éric Fortin	1,414	20.32
Total valid votes		6,959	100.00

Source: ÉLECTION MUNICIPALE DU 4 NOVEMBRE 2001, City of Laval.
