= Claude Lefebvre (politician) =

Canadian municipal politician

Mayor Claude Lefebvre

4th Mayor of Laval
- In office 1981 – June 8, 1989
- Preceded by: Lucien Paiement
- Succeeded by: Gilles Vaillancourt

Personal details
- Born: Claude Ulysse Lefebvre; February 23, 1929 Montreal, Quebec
- Died: January 19, 2016 (aged 86) Montreal, Quebec
- Party: Parti PRO des Lavallois

Claude Ulysse Lefebvre (French pronunciation: [klod ylis ləfɛvʁ]; February 23, 1929 – January 19, 2016) was a Canadian municipal politician, who served as mayor of the city of Laval, Quebec, Canada from 1981 to 1989.

In 1984, while Lefebvre was mayor, Laval and the French commune of Laval en Mayenne became twinned sister cities.
