= Parti république du Québec =

Republic of Quebec Party Parti république du Québec
- Leader: Gilles Paquette
- Founded: 2007
- Dissolved: 2009
- Ideology: Conservatism; Quebec sovereigntism Green politics

The Parti république du Québec (French pronunciation: [paʁti ʁepyblik dy kebɛk]; in English: Republic of Quebec Party) was a small and short-lived conservative, sovereigntist and green political party in the Canadian province of Quebec. It was led by Gilles Paquette, who tried unsuccessfully to contest the leadership of the Parti Québécois in 2005.

The party was recognized by the Chief Electoral Officer of Quebec on 26 March 2007, the same day for voting in general elections in Quebec. The head of this new political movement had been an independent candidate in the riding of Soulanges. Two other members of the PRQ, Régent Millette and Marie-Ange Germain, respectively, had been candidates of the Parti démocratie chrétienne (Christian Democratic Party) in 2003 and the Green Party of Quebec in 2007. At the time of its official recognition, the party claimed it had more than 2000 members.

In the December 8, 2008 Quebec National Assembly elections, the party ran one candidate (Gilles Paquette), in Vaudreuil, where he received 140 votes. This result, totalling 0.004% of the total votes cast in the province, is the lowest percentage of the total vote that any political party contesting an election has received in the history of Quebec.

== Dissolution ==
In January 2010, Quebec's Chief Electoral Officer announced that the party had lost its status as an authorised political party, effective December 30, 2009.

== Results summary ==
General election	# of candidates	# of elected candidates	% of popular vote	# of votes
2008	1	0	0.00%	140
