= Défi Vert de Québec =

Municipal political party in Canada

Québec's Green Challenge Défi Vert de Québec
- Leader: Richard Domm
- President: Francois Bédard
- Founded: 17 May 2007
- Headquarters: 7306, avenue des Rennes; Quebec City, Quebec; G1G 4N8
- Ideology: Environmentalism; Fiscal responsibility Social justice Pacifism; Participatory democracy
- International affiliation: Global Greens Charter
- Colours: Yellow and Green

Website
- www.defivert.org

The Défi Vert de Québec (DVQ), literally " Québec's Green Challenge", is a municipal political party in Quebec City, Quebec, Canada.

The values and principles of the Défi Vert de Québec are based on the Global Greens Charter, available in seven different languages at . The Défi Vert de Québec is the first Canadian municipal party to adhere to this charter, which was created in Canberra in 2001. Its founder and leader was Richard Domm.

== Press review ==
- June 14, 2009 "Fourbir les armes" on Radio-Canada. A report on the next municipal elections in Québec .
- June 14, 2009 TV report: The municipal revival in Québec, with the Défi Vert holding their congress this weekend, a report by Catherine Lanthier.
- March 17, 2009 "Défi vert de Québec: ecology via everything else" in Québec Hebdo.
- May 29, 2007 "A new party in Québec" on Radio-Canada.
- October 5, 2007 "The DVQ would account for GHGs Québec arena standards." in Québec Hebdo.
