= Alexandre Duplessis =

Canadian politician

6th Mayor of Laval
- In office November 23, 2012 – June 28, 2013
- Preceded by: Gilles Vaillancourt; Basile Angelopoulos (acting)
- Succeeded by: Martine Beaugrand

Personal details
- Born: 1970 Laval
- Party: Parti PRO des Lavallois → independent
- Profession: accountant

Alexandre Duplessis (French pronunciation: [alɛksɑ̃dʁ dyplɛsi]; born 1970) is a Canadian politician. He served as the mayor of Laval, Quebec, from November 23, 2012, until June 28, 2013. He was selected as the new mayor of Laval, Quebec following the resignation of Gilles Vaillancourt, winning a 15–3 vote of Laval City Council over fellow councillor Jacques St-Jean. Duplessis resigned after just seven months in office following allegations of soliciting prostitutes.

Duplessis is an accountant by profession as well as a former bus company executive.

Previously a city councillor for the Saint-Martin ward, he was a member of the Parti PRO des Lavallois until that party's dissolution on November 19, 2012.

In May 2013, testimony at the Charbonneau Commission hearings also implicated Duplessis, along with virtually the entire sitting council, in the same corruption scandal that brought down Vaillancourt. Duplessis has asserted his innocence of the allegations, but requested that Sylvain Gaudreault, the provincial Minister of Municipal Affairs, place the city in trusteeship until the next municipal election.

On June 3, 2013, the provincial government placed the city under trusteeship. Florent Gagné, a former head of the Sûreté du Québec, served as the city's head trustee, with responsibility for reviewing and approving or rejecting all decisions made by city council.

In June 2013, Duplessis filed a police complaint claiming that a prostitute had attempted to extort money from him.

In May 2013, Radio-Canada reported that Duplessis had been fined $500 plus costs for possession of a radar detector.
