= Lucien Paiement =

3rd Mayor of Laval
- In office 1973–1981
- Preceded by: Jacques Tétreault
- Succeeded by: Claude Lefebvre

Personal details
- Born: 16 October 1932 Saint-Hermas, Mirabel, Quebec
- Died: 23 January 2013 (aged 80) Laval, Quebec
- Occupation: general practitioner
- Profession: politician, doctor, horse breeder

Lucien Paiement (French pronunciation: [lysjɛ̃ pɛmɑ̃]; 16 October 1932 – 23 January 2013) was a doctor, municipal politician and owner of racehorses in the Canadian province of Quebec.

A University de Montreal graduate in Medicine, established his practice in 1958 in the Municipality of Vimont, on Ile Jésus, which later became part of the merger forming the City of Laval on August 6, 1965.

In November 1973, Dr Paiement was elected Mayor of Laval and remained in that position until November 1981.

It was back in 1966 that he decided that Laval should have its own hospital. Despite challenges and adversity, he devised a report for presentation to the Quebec government that demonstrated Laval residents’ need for their own hospital on Ile Jésus.

Following the government's acceptance of the project, Paiement became the president and founder of Laval’s Cite-de-la-Santé Hospital. After 12 years of effort, it was inaugurated on April 10, 1978.

Following his retirement from political life, he became deeply involved in the world of Standardbred racehorses in Quebec-as an owner, breeder, association president, and promoter of the industry.

In the heart of Laval, a street near the Montmorency Metro Station bears his name.

Dr. Paiement died on January 23, 2013, at Cité-de-la-Santé Hospital.
