= 2009 Laval municipal election =

The 2009 Laval municipal election took place on November 1, 2009, to elect a mayor and city councillors in Laval, Quebec.

Gilles Vaillancourt was elected to a sixth term as mayor, and his municipal party won every seat on city council.

== Results ==
2009 Laval municipal election: Mayor of Laval
| Party | Candidate | Votes | % |
|---|---|---|---|
| Parti PRO des Lavallois | (x)Gilles Vaillancourt | 60,045 | 61.29 |
| Mouvement lavallois | Lydia Aboulian | 22,179 | 22.64 |
| Parti au service du citoyen | Robert Bordeleau | 14,577 | 14.88 |
| Independent | Régent Millette | 682 | 0.70 |
| Independent | Rick Blatter | 482 | 0.49 |
| Total valid votes | | 97,965 | 100 |

2009 Laval election, Councillor, District One
| Party | Candidate | Total votes | % of total votes |
|---|---|---|---|
| Parti PRO des Lavallois | (incumbent)Jacques St-Jean | 3,132 | 65.87 |
| Mouvement lavallois | Danielle Guillaume | 822 | 17.29 |
| Parti au service du citoyen | Vladimir Létang | 535 | 11.25 |
| Independent | Christian Lajoie | 176 | 3.70 |
| Independent | Franklin Valois | 90 | 1.89 |
| Total valid votes | | 4,755 | 100.00 |

2009 Laval election, Councillor, District Two
| Party | Candidate | Total votes | % of total votes |
|---|---|---|---|
| Parti PRO des Lavallois | (incumbent)Sylvie Clermont | 3,494 | 75.12 |
| Mouvement lavallois | Alain Boucher | 1,157 | 24.88 |
| Total valid votes | | 4,651 | 100.00 |

2009 Laval election, Councillor, District Three
| Party | Candidate | Total votes | % of total votes |
|---|---|---|---|
| Parti PRO des Lavallois | (incumbent)Madeleine Sollazzo | 2,806 | 62.65 |
| Mouvement lavallois | Tristan Desjardins Drouin | 1,673 | 37.35 |
| Total valid votes | | 4,479 | 100.00 |

2009 Laval election, Councillor, District Four
| Party | Candidate | Total votes | % of total votes |
|---|---|---|---|
| Parti PRO des Lavallois | (incumbent)Michèle Des Trois Maisons | 2,972 | 65.26 |
| Mouvement lavallois | Benoit Fauteux | 1,582 | 34.74 |
| Total valid votes | | 4,554 | 100.00 |

2009 Laval election, Councillor, District Five
| Party | Candidate | Total votes | % of total votes |
|---|---|---|---|
| Parti PRO des Lavallois | (incumbent)Francine Légaré | 2,532 | 66.58 |
| Parti au service du citoyen | Thérèse Duarte | 647 | 17.01 |
| Mouvement lavallois | Jocelyne Frédéric-Gauthier | 624 | 16.41 |
| Total valid votes | | 3,803 | 100.00 |

2009 Laval election, Councillor, District Six
| Party | Candidate | Total votes | % of total votes |
|---|---|---|---|
| Parti PRO des Lavallois | Claire Le Bel | 2,387 | 58.04 |
| Parti au service du citoyen | Anne Renaud-Deschênes | 871 | 21.18 |
| Mouvement lavallois | Sophie Deslauriers | 855 | 20.79 |
| Total valid votes | | 4,113 | 100.00 |

2009 Laval election, Councillor, District Seven
| Party | Candidate | Total votes | % of total votes |
|---|---|---|---|
| Parti PRO des Lavallois | (incumbent)Benoit Fradet | 3,159 | 71.91 |
| Parti au service du citoyen | Jose Onofre | 727 | 16.55 |
| Mouvement lavallois | Antonio Spada | 507 | 11.54 |
| Total valid votes | | 4,393 | 100.00 |

2009 Laval election, Councillor, District Eight
| Party | Candidate | Total votes | % of total votes |
|---|---|---|---|
| Parti PRO des Lavallois | (incumbent)Norman Girard | 3,267 | 64.20 |
| Parti au service du citoyen | Danielle Soucy | 1,186 | 23.31 |
| Mouvement lavallois | Walter Peruz | 636 | 12.50 |
| Total valid votes | | 5,089 | 100.00 |

2009 Laval election, Councillor, District Nine
| Party | Candidate | Total votes | % of total votes |
|---|---|---|---|
| Parti PRO des Lavallois | (incumbent)Yvon Martineau | 2,554 | 47.24 |
| Mouvement lavallois | David Decotis | 2,226 | 41.18 |
| Parti au service du citoyen | Tanya Onofre | 626 | 11.58 |
| Total valid votes | | 5,406 | 100.00 |

2009 Laval election, Councillor, District Ten
| Party | Candidate | Total votes | % of total votes |
|---|---|---|---|
| Parti PRO des Lavallois | (incumbent)Lucie Hill Larocque | 3,294 | 59.90 |
| Mouvement lavallois | Alexandre Foisy | 1,550 | 28.19 |
| Parti au service du citoyen | Eve Thibault | 655 | 11.91 |
| Total valid votes | | 5,499 | 100.00 |

2009 Laval election, Councillor, District Eleven
| Party | Candidate | Total votes | % of total votes |
|---|---|---|---|
| Parti PRO des Lavallois | (incumbent)Ginette Grisé | 2,799 | 62.62 |
| Parti au service du citoyen | Lucile Martin Bordeleau | 929 | 20.78 |
| Mouvement lavallois | Claude Théberge | 742 | 16.60 |
| Total valid votes | | 4,470 | 100.00 |

2009 Laval election, Councillor, District Twelve
| Party | Candidate | Total votes | % of total votes |
|---|---|---|---|
| Parti PRO des Lavallois | (incumbent)Jocelyne Guertin | 3,961 | 78.79 |
| Mouvement lavallois | Virginie Dufour | 649 | 12.91 |
| Parti au service du citoyen | Patricia Sepulveda | 417 | 8.30 |
| Total valid votes | | 5,027 | 100.00 |

2009 Laval election, Councillor, District Thirteen
| Party | Candidate | Total votes | % of total votes |
|---|---|---|---|
| Parti PRO des Lavallois | (incumbent)Ginette Legault Bernier | 3,048 | 74.43 |
| Mouvement lavallois | Nikki Petropoulos | 1,047 | 25.57 |
| Total valid votes | | 4,095 | 100.00 |

2009 Laval election, Councillor, District Fourteen
| Party | Candidate | Total votes | % of total votes |
|---|---|---|---|
| Parti PRO des Lavallois | (incumbent)Basile Angelopoulos | 3,335 | 84.88 |
| Parti au service du citoyen | Noémia Onofre De Lima | 326 | 8.30 |
| Mouvement lavallois | Karla Osorio | 268 | 6.82 |
| Total valid votes | | 3,929 | 100.00 |

2009 Laval election, Councillor, District Fifteen
| Party | Candidate | Total votes | % of total votes |
|---|---|---|---|
| Parti PRO des Lavallois | (incumbent) Alexandre Duplessis | 2,322 | 58.61 |
| Independent | Manuel Botelho | 1,640 | 41.39 |
| Total valid votes | | 3,962 | 100.00 |

2009 Laval election, Councillor, District Sixteen
| Party | Candidate | Total votes | % of total votes |
|---|---|---|---|
| Parti PRO des Lavallois | (incumbent)Pierre Cléroux | 2,807 | 61.95 |
| Mouvement lavallois | Jean Habel | 863 | 19.05 |
| Parti au service du citoyen | Anita De Lima | 861 | 19.00 |
| Total valid votes | | 4,531 | 100.00 |

2009 Laval election, Councillor, District Seventeen
| Party | Candidate | Total votes | % of total votes |
|---|---|---|---|
| Parti PRO des Lavallois | (incumbent)Jean-Jacques Beldié | 2,365 | 52.50 |
| Mouvement lavallois | Isabelle Piché | 1,737 | 38.56 |
| Parti au service du citoyen | Rezak Belaid | 403 | 8.95 |
| Total valid votes | | 4,505 | 100.00 |

2009 Laval election, Councillor, District Eighteen
| Party | Candidate | Total votes | % of total votes |
|---|---|---|---|
| Parti PRO des Lavallois | France Dubreuil | 2,956 | 66.17 |
| Mouvement lavallois | Emilio Migliozzi | 1,511 | 33.83 |
| Total valid votes | | 4,467 | 100.00 |

2009 Laval election, Councillor, District Nineteen
| Party | Candidate | Total votes | % of total votes |
|---|---|---|---|
| Parti PRO des Lavallois | (incumbent)Yvon Bromley | 2,734 | 61.97 |
| Parti au service du citoyen | Kevin Christo Lefebvre | 940 | 21.31 |
| Mouvement lavallois | James Lee Bissi | 738 | 16.73 |
| Total valid votes | | 4,412 | 100.00 |

2009 Laval election, Councillor, District Twenty
| Party | Candidate | Total votes | % of total votes |
|---|---|---|---|
| Parti PRO des Lavallois | Martine Beaugrand | 3,027 | 54.37 |
| Parti au service du citoyen | Sophie Hébert | 1,509 | 27.11 |
| Mouvement lavallois | Isabelle Chumpitaz | 1,031 | 18.52 |
| Total valid votes | | 5,567 | 100.00 |

2009 Laval election, Councillor, District Twenty-One
| Party | Candidate | Total votes | % of total votes |
|---|---|---|---|
| Parti PRO des Lavallois | (incumbent)Denis Robillard | 3,196 | 57.51 |
| Mouvement lavallois | Jean-François Paquet | 2,361 | 42.49 |
| Total valid votes | | 5,557 | 100.00 |

Source: Résultants 2009; Élections municipales 2009; Affairs municipales, Régions et Occupation du territoire, Government of Quebec.
