= Danielle Roy Marinelli =

Danielle Roy Marinelli was the first mayor of Lévis, Quebec, elected in 2005 and reelected in 2009. She was also the last mayor of Saint-Jean-Chrysostome, Lévis, Quebec, serving from 1999 to 2001.

A native of Montmagny, Quebec, she was educated at the CEGEP at La Pocatière in nursing technology and became a nurse specializing in gerontology. She was working as a financial security consultant before entering politics. In 1991, she was elected to the municipal council for Saint-Jean-Chrysostome. She was president of the Société de transport de Lévis from 1999 to 2005. In 2000, she was vice-president of the Centre communautaire juridique de Québec.

Her grandfather Louis-O. Roy served as mayor of Montmagny and her cousin Claude Roy represented Montmagny-L'Islet in the Quebec assembly. She is married to Flavio Marinelli.
