= 2005 Laval municipal election =

Election for a mayor and city councillors in Laval, Quebec

The 2005 Laval municipal election took place on November 6, 2005, to elect a mayor and city councillors in Laval, Quebec.

Gilles Vaillancourt was elected to a fifth term as mayor, and his municipal party won every seat on city council. No other parties contested the election.

== Results ==
=== Mayor ===
2005 Laval municipal election: Mayor of Laval
Party	Candidate	Votes	%
Parti PRO des Lavallois	(x)Gilles Vaillancourt	58,804	74.61
Independent	Audrey Boisvert	12,613	16.00
Independent	Emilio Migliozzi	3,928	4.98
Independent	Régent Millette	3,474	4.41
Total valid votes		78,819	100

=== Council ===
2005 Laval election, Councillor, District One
Party	Candidate	Total votes	% of total votes
Parti PRO des Lavallois	(incumbent)Jacques St-Jean	2,939	73.60
Independent	Christian Lajoie	548	13.72
Independent	Franklin Valois	506	12.67
Total valid votes		3,993	100.00

2005 Laval election, Councillor, District Two
Party	Candidate	Total votes	% of total votes
Parti PRO des Lavallois	(incumbent)Sylvie Clermont	accl.	

2005 Laval election, Councillor, District Three
Party	Candidate	Total votes	% of total votes
Parti PRO des Lavallois	(incumbent)Madeleine Sollazzo	2,884	70.05
Independent	Tino Rossi	1,233	29.95
Total valid votes		4,117	100.00

2005 Laval election, Councillor, District Four
Party	Candidate	Total votes	% of total votes
Parti PRO des Lavallois	Michèle Des Trois Maisons	2,466	58.16
Independent	François Bordeleau	1,480	34.91
Independent	Robert Allard	294	6.93
Total valid votes		4,240	100.00

2005 Laval election, Councillor, District Five
Party	Candidate	Total votes	% of total votes
Parti PRO des Lavallois	(incumbent)Francine Légaré	2,536	71.52
Independent	Alain Bordeleau	776	21.88
Independent	Carmen Beauséjour	234	6.60
Total valid votes		3,546	100.00

2005 Laval election, Councillor, District Six
Party	Candidate	Total votes	% of total votes
Parti PRO des Lavallois	(incumbent)Jean-Jacques Lapierre	accl.	

2005 Laval election, Councillor, District Seven
Party	Candidate	Total votes	% of total votes
Parti PRO des Lavallois	(incumbent)Benoit Fradet	accl.	

2005 Laval election, Councillor, District Eight
Party	Candidate	Total votes	% of total votes
Parti PRO des Lavallois	(incumbent)Norman Girard	accl.	

2005 Laval election, Councillor, District Nine
Party	Candidate	Total votes	% of total votes
Parti PRO des Lavallois	(incumbent)Yvon Martineau	accl.	

2005 Laval election, Councillor, District Ten
Party	Candidate	Total votes	% of total votes
Parti PRO des Lavallois	(incumbent)Lucie Hill Larocque	2,789	72.40
Independent	Alexandre Foisy	1,063	27.60
Total valid votes		3,852	100.00

2005 Laval election, Councillor, District Eleven
Party	Candidate	Total votes	% of total votes
Parti PRO des Lavallois	Ginette Grisé	2,153	61.90
Independent	Robert Bordeleau	1,247	35.85
Independent	Jacquelin Mainville	78	2.24
Total valid votes		3,478	100.00

2005 Laval election, Councillor, District Twelve
Party	Candidate	Total votes	% of total votes
Parti PRO des Lavallois	(incumbent)Jocelyne Guertin	3,526	83.34
Independent	Louis Bordeleau	705	16.66
Total valid votes		4,231	100.00

2005 Laval election, Councillor, District Thirteen
Party	Candidate	Total votes	% of total votes
Parti PRO des Lavallois	(incumbent)Ginette Legault Bernier	accl.	

2005 Laval election, Councillor, District Fourteen
Party	Candidate	Total votes	% of total votes
Parti PRO des Lavallois	(incumbent)Basile Angelopoulos	3,590	89.93
Independent	Gopal Arora	247	6.19
Independent	Samira Tasli	155	3.88
Total valid votes		3,992	100.00

2005 Laval election, Councillor, District Fifteen
Party	Candidate	Total votes	% of total votes
Parti PRO des Lavallois	Alexandre Duplessis	accl.	

2005 Laval election, Councillor, District Sixteen
Party	Candidate	Total votes	% of total votes
Parti PRO des Lavallois	(incumbent)Pierre Cléroux	3,155	77.96
Independent	Sylvain A. Trottier	892	22.04
Total valid votes		4,047	100.00

2005 Laval election, Councillor, District Seventeen
Party	Candidate	Total votes	% of total votes
Parti PRO des Lavallois	(incumbent)Jean-Jacques Beldié	accl.	

2005 Laval election, Councillor, District Eighteen
Party	Candidate	Total votes	% of total votes
Parti PRO des Lavallois	(incumbent)Robert Plante	accl.	

2005 Laval election, Councillor, District Nineteen
Party	Candidate	Total votes	% of total votes
Parti PRO des Lavallois	(incumbent)Yvon Bromley	2,621	75.86
Independent	Kevin Christo Lefebvre	834	24.14
Total valid votes		3,455	100.00

2005 Laval election, Councillor, District Twenty
Party	Candidate	Total votes	% of total votes
Parti PRO des Lavallois	(incumbent)André Boileau	3,659	76.21
Independent	Daniel Lafrenière	1,142	23.79
Total valid votes		4,801	100.00

2005 Laval election, Councillor, District Twenty-One
Party	Candidate	Total votes	% of total votes
Parti PRO des Lavallois	(incumbent)Denis Robillard	3,267	74.47
Mouvement lavallois	Yvon Montplaisir	1,120	25.53
Total valid votes		4,387	100.00

Source: ÉLECTION MUNICIPALE DU 6 NOVEMBRE 2005, City of Laval.
