= Éric Forest =

Canadian politician

The Honourable Éric Forest

Canadian Senator from Quebec (Gulf)
- Incumbent
- Assumed office November 21, 2016
- Nominated by: Justin Trudeau
- Appointed by: David Johnston
- Preceded by: Romeo Dallaire

Personal details
- Born: April 6, 1952 (age 74) Bonaventure, Quebec, Canada
- Party: Independent Senators Group

Éric Forest (born April 6, 1952) is a Canadian Senator from Quebec. He was previously Mayor of Rimouski, Quebec from 2005 to 2016 and had been president of the l'Union des municipalités québécoises from 2011 to 2014.

== Career ==
From 1995 to 2006, he was the first president of the Rimouski Océanic. a junior ice hockey team in the Quebec Major Junior Hockey League.

Forest was first elected to office, at the age of 27, as a councillor in Pointe-au-Père, Quebec, becoming mayor two years later. He then entered private life becoming the co-owner of a car dealership before returning to politics in 1994 as a city councillor in Rimouski.

In 2014, he received the Jean-Paul L'Allier Award, which honours a Quebec elected official for outstanding vision, leadership and achievements in urban planning and land-use planning.

He considered running as a Liberal candidate in the 2014 Quebec provincial election, but eventually decided to complete his term as mayor.
