= Action civique de Québec =

Action Civique de Quebec
- Founded: 2001
- Dissolved: 2009
- Ideology: Centre-right

Website
- web.archive.org/web/20060721221142/http://www.actionciviquedequebec.com:80/index.php

Action civique de Québec (ACQ) was a political party in Quebec City, Quebec, Canada that contested municipal elections. It was created in 2001 after the amalgamation of Quebec City and surrounding suburban municipalities. It was dissolved in 2009. Though it had a minority in the Council, its councillors ended up sharing the power between 2005 and 2007, as they formed an alliance with mayor Andrée P. Boucher, who named them to the city's executive committee, thus excluding from the executive committee the councillors of the Renouveau municipal de Québec, the party holding the majority of seats. However, the death of Boucher ended this situation.
