= 2006 Quebec municipal elections =

These are the candidates and winners of the municipal elections in the province of Quebec, in Canada, held November 5, 2006.

Candidates alone were elected without opposition. Winners are in bold.

== Port-Cartier ==
Turnout: 2394 voters out of 5109 electors (46,8%)

- Mayor:
  - Jean Pierre Boudreau
  - **Laurence Méthot Losier**
- Councillor 1: **Roger Chenard**
- Councillor 2: **Henriette Lapierre**
- Councillor 3: **Gilles Fournier**
- Councillor 4:
  - **Carole Chevarie** (Without opposition)
  - Yvon St-Gelais (Desisted)
- Councillor 5: **Mary Corbey**
- Councillor 6: **Jean-Marc Bacon**

== Sept-Îles ==
Turnout: 8086 voters out of 20278 electors (39,9%)

- Mayor:
  - Charles-Henri Desrosiers
  - Andrée-Gurthy Dufour
  - **Ghislain Lévesque**
- District of Clarke:
  - Myreille Bernatchez
  - **Gervais Gagné**
- District of Ferland:
  - Maurice Gagné
  - **Alain Lapierre**
- District of L'Anse:
  - Lorraine Bourgoin
  - **Jean Masse**
- District of Vieux-Poste:
  - Ghislain Fournier
  - Sylvie Levesque
  - **Denis Miousse**
- District of Vigneault:
  - **Gaby Gauthier**
  - Rodrigue Vigneault
- District of Monseigneur Blanche: **Lorraine Dubuc-Johnson**
- District of Sainte-Famille: **Martial Lévesque**
- District of Rive:
  - Frédéric Décoste
  - **Serge Lévesque**
- District of Gallix: **Guylaine Lejeune**
- District of Moisie:
  - **Claude Lessard**
  - Rolland Smith

== Thetford Mines ==
Turnout: 11842 voters out of 21213 electors (55,8%)

- Mayor:
  - **Luc Berthold**
  - Normand Laliberté
- Councillor 1:
  - **Clément Boudreau**
  - Rosaire Lessard
- Councillor 2:
  - Marcel Chalifoux
  - Normand Fortier
  - **Renaud Legendre**
  - Michel Marceau
- Councillor 3:
  - **Ghyslain Cliche**
  - Charles Nadeau
- Councillor 4:
  - **Luc Champagne**
  - Georges-Henri Cloutier
- Councillor 5: **Carmen Jalbert Jacques**
- Councillor 6:
  - Denise Bergeron
  - **Louis-Philippe Champagne**
- Councillor 7:
  - Robert Bourret
  - **Marco Tanguay**
- Councillor 8: **Marc F. Vachon**
- Councillor 9:
  - **Paul-André Marchand**
  - Marc Vachon
- Councillor 10: **Gaétan Vachon**
