= Gilles Vaillancourt =

Canadian politician

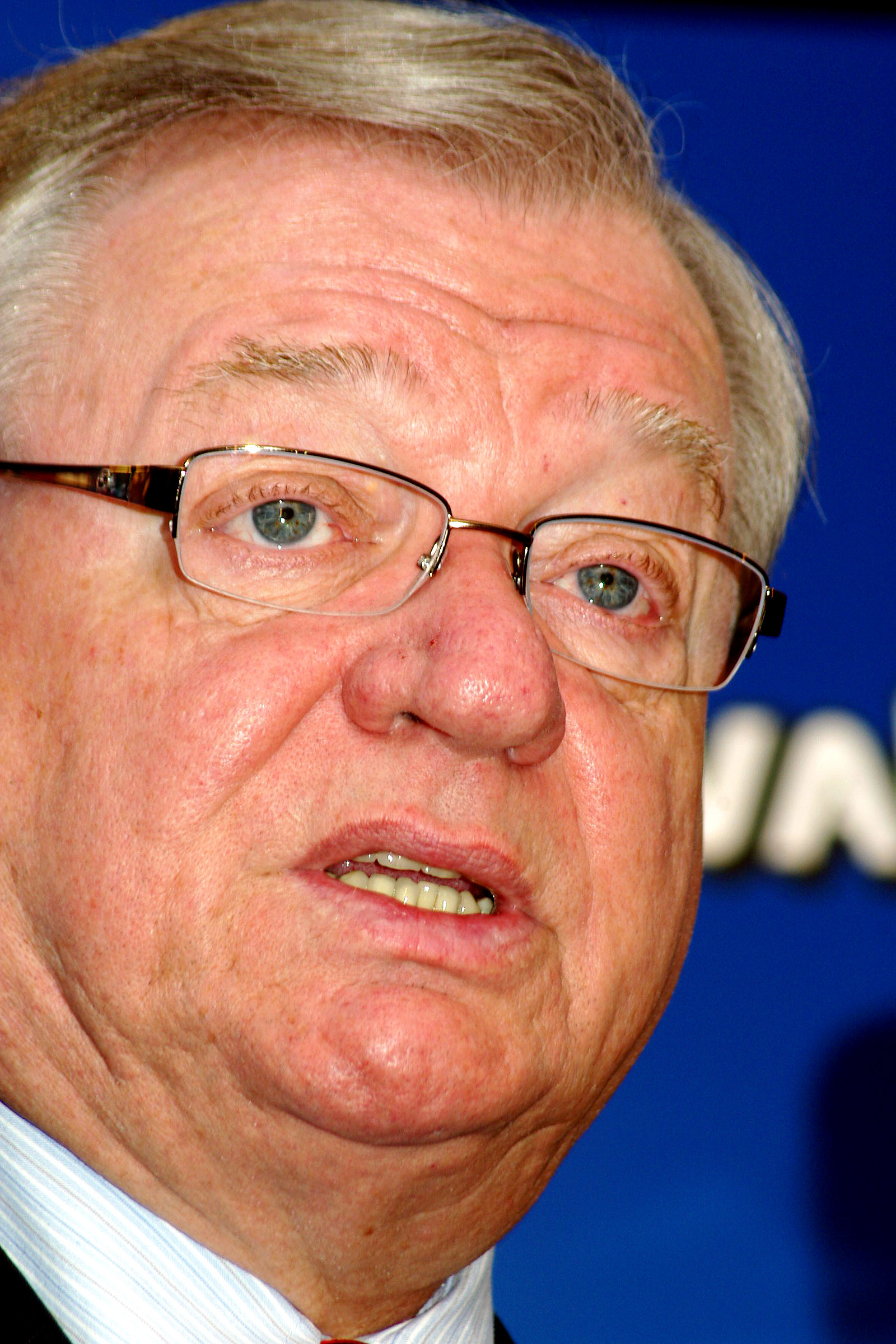

5th Mayor of Laval
- In office June 8, 1989 – November 9, 2012
- Preceded by: Claude Lefebvre
- Succeeded by: Marc Demers

Personal details
- Born: January 9, 1941 (age 85) Laval-des-Rapides, Quebec
- Party: Parti PRO des Lavallois
- Profession: Home builder

Gilles Vaillancourt (French pronunciation: [ʒil vajɑ̃kuʁ]; born January 9, 1941) is a former Canadian politician. He served as the mayor of Laval, Quebec, from June 8, 1989 until his resignation on November 9, 2012. At that time, Vaillancourt was also the leader of the Parti PRO des Lavallois. Known as the “King of Laval”, his resignation came following allegations of fraud, to which he pleaded guilty in December 2016, and he was given a six-year prison sentence.

== Career ==
He first served on Laval City Council in 1973 as alderman for the district of Laval-des-Rapides in the party of former mayor Dr. Lucien Paiement, then in the party of the mayor Claude Lefebvre who founded the Parti du Ralliement Officiel (PRO de Laval) in 1980. In 1989, he took over as mayor and as party leader from Lefebvre.

Vaillancourt was president of the Union of Municipalities of Quebec from April 1995 to April 1997. He was reelected mayor in 1997, 2001, 2005 and 2009 with a majority of candidates.

In the 2005 Laval municipal election, Vaillancourt was re-elected with a large majority: 74.61% compared to 16% for his nearest opponent, Audrey Boisvert, an 18-year-old student.

Under his administration, the Orange Line of the Montreal Metro was extended to Laval in 2007. Following this extension, he suggested that a further six stations be added to the line. Three of these would be in Laval and three in Montreal, in order to create a loop out of the orange line.

During the 2009 Laval municipal election, Vaillancourt was re-elected with a majority of 61.3%, compared to 22.64% for Lydia Aboulian, mayoral candidate for the Mouvement lavallois.

Vaillancourt also sat at the Federation of Canadian Municipalities and chairs the Committee of municipal finances.

== Legal issues, resignation and prison ==
As part of the Charbonneau Commission, the Permanent Anti-Corruption Unit (French: Unité permanente anticorruption) inquired and searched Vaillancourt's residence for evidence of corruption, as well as Laval City Hall and two other administrative buildings on October 4, 2012. The inquiries occurred in a wide search for contracts which were attributed during Gilles Vaillancourt's mandate.

On October 24, 2012, Operation Hammer subjected the Mayor Vaillancourt to more raids. Police from the Sûreté du Québec also raided more than ten safety deposit boxes rented by Vaillancourt at various financial institutions. Later that same day, Vaillancourt announced that he would be temporarily leaving his function as mayor for health reasons.

On November 9, 2012, Vaillancourt resigned as mayor and denied all of the corruption allegations against him. Following his resignation, the remaining Parti PRO des Lavallois councillors voted to dissolve the party on November 19. City councillor Basile Angelopoulos served as acting mayor of the city until the selection of his formal successor, Alexandre Duplessis, on November 23.

On May 9, 2013, Vaillancourt was arrested at his home by police, along with 36 other people, and charged with 12 charges that included fraud, corruption, money laundering and gangsterism. In the subsequent election to name his successor at Laval city hall, candidate Claire Le Bel went public on Radio Canada with a recording alleged to be that of Gilles Vaillancourt offering to fund her campaign with cash from questionable donors. Le Bel was subsequently placed under police protection after these revelations.

On December 1, 2016, Vaillancourt, as part of a plea deal, pleaded guilty to fraud, breach of trust and conspiracy for actions of corruption in awarding city construction contracts between 1996 and 2010. On December 15, he was sentenced to six years in prison and ordered to pay $9 million in restitution to the city from a Swiss bank account and other assets.

In November 2017 Vaillancourt was granted day parole, and on December 6, 2018, was granted full parole.
