= Blondeau River (Fraser River tributary) =

Blondeau
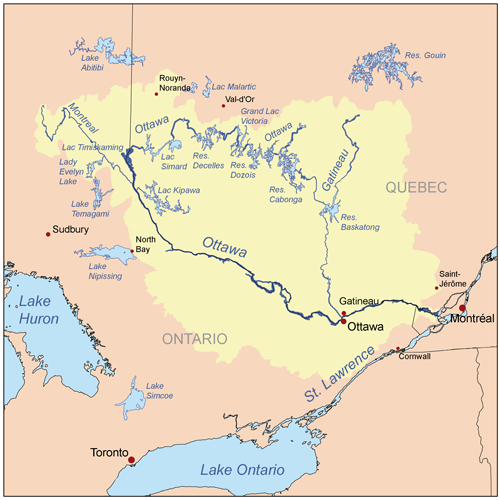
- Watershed of Ottawa River

Location
- Country: Canada
- Province: Quebec
- Region: Outaouais

Physical characteristics
- Source: La Truite Lake
  - location: Belleterre, Quebec, Témiscamingue Regional County Municipality (RCM), Outaouais, Quebec
  - coordinates: 47°24′14″N 78°50′30″W
  - elevation: 362 m (1,188 ft)
- Mouth: Fraser River
  - location: Sheenboro, Quebec, Témiscamingue Regional County Municipality (RCM), Outaouais, Quebec
  - coordinates: 47°23′57″N 78°57′09″W
  - elevation: 290 m (950 ft)
- Length: 21.9 km (13.6 mi)

Basin features
- Tributaries
  - left: (upstream); Gringras creek; outlet of "Lac à la Vase"

The Blondeau River is a tributary of the Fraser River, flowing into the municipalities of Belleterre and Latulipe-et-Gaboury, into the Témiscamingue Regional County Municipality (RCM), in the administrative region of Abitibi-Témiscamingue, in Quebec, Canada.

The Blondeau River flows entirely in forest territory. Forestry is the main economic activity of this hydrographic slope; recreational tourism activities, second.

Annually, the surface of the river is usually frozen from mid-November to mid-April, however safe ice circulation is generally from mid-December to late March.

== Geography ==
The Blondeau River rises at the mouth of Lake Blondeau (length: 1.7 kilometres (1.1 mi), altitude: 321 metres (1,053 ft)) in the municipality of Belleterre. This lake is fed by the outlet of Lake Martel (coming from the South) and the discharge of three small lakes (coming from the North). This lake has four islands.

The mouth of Lake Blondeau is located at:

- 8.4 kilometres (5.2 mi) north-east of the mouth of the Blondeau River;
- 18.9 kilometres (11.7 mi) east of the mouth of the Fraser River (Ottawa River);
- 34.5 kilometres (21.4 mi) east of the mouth of the Des Quinze Lake on the Ottawa River;
- 17.7 kilometres (11.0 mi) south-east of the village center of Moffet;
- 15.6 kilometres (9.7 mi) south of Lac Simard (Temiscamingue).

The main hydrographic slopes near the "Blondeau River" are:

- North side: Grassy Lake (Témiscamingue), Des Quinze Lake, Fraser River (Ottawa River), Ottawa River;
- East side: Rivière aux Sables (Témiscamingue), Guillet River;
- South side: River of Woods, McKenzie River (Fraser River), Lake Ostaboningen;
- West side: Fraser River (Ottawa River), Laverlochère River, McKenzie River (Fraser River).

From the mouth of Lac Pierre (located west of the lake), the Blondeau River flows over 21.9 kilometres (13.6 mi) according to the following segments:

- 5.2 kilometres (3.2 mi) to the south, to a creek (coming from the south);
- 2.6 kilometres (1.6 mi) southwesterly, winding in a marsh zone to a creek (coming from the southeast);
- 1.7 kilometres (1.1 mi) westward in a marsh zone to the outlet of Vase Lake (coming from the North);
- 1.6 kilometres (0.99 mi) west to Gingras Creek (from the North);
- 10.8 kilometres (6.7 mi) west through marsh areas and into the territory of Latulipe-et-Gaboury, then north to the mouth of the river.

The Blondeau River discharges on the east bank of the Fraser River (Ottawa River).

This confluence of the Marécaguese River is located at:

- 11.2 kilometres (7.0 mi) southeasterly of the mouth of the Fraser River (Ottawa River);
- 27.6 kilometres (17.1 mi) south-east of the Quinze dam located at the mouth of the Des Quinze Lake;
- 21.1 kilometres (13.1 mi) south-west of Lac Simard (Temiscamingue);
- 6.7 kilometres (4.2 mi) south-east of the village center of Latulippe;
- 41.1 kilometres (25.5 mi) east of Timiskaming Lake;
- 36.9 kilometres (22.9 mi) north-east of downtown Ville-Marie (city).

== Toponymy ==
The term "Blondeau" is a family name of French origin. Formerly, this watercourse was designated "Little Fraser River".

The toponym "Blondeau River" was formalized on December 5, 1968, at the Commission de toponymie du Québec, i.e. at the creation of this commission.

== See also ==
- Ottawa River, a watercourse
- Des Quinze Lake, a body of water
- Belleterre, a municipality
- Latulipe-et-Gaboury, a municipality
- Témiscamingue Regional County Municipality (RCM)
- List of rivers of Quebec
