= Simard Lake (Témiscamingue) =

Freshwater lake in Témiscamingue, Quebec, Canada

Lac Simard
- Location within Quebec
- Location: Laforce / Moffet, Témiscamingue Regional County Municipality, Quebec
- Coordinates: 47°37′46″N 78°41′26″W
- Primary inflows: Ottawa River
- Primary outflows: Ottawa River
- Basin countries: Canada
- Max. length: 18 km (11 mi)
- Max. width: 12 km (7.5 mi)
- Surface area: 170 km^{2} (66 sq mi)

Lac Simard is a freshwater lake in the municipality of Laforce, in the Regional County Municipality (RCM) of Temiscamingue, in northwestern Quebec, Canada.

== Geography ==
It is located near Moffet in Témiscamingue Regional County Municipality.

Simard Lake covers an area of 170 km². With a length of 18 km and a width of 12 km, the lake is located about 25 km west of Decelles Reservoir and more than 50 km to the east of Lake Timiskaming. Specifically, the Lac Simard is located to the east of Des Quinze Lake, north of the village of Laforce, at 16.5 km north of the village of Belleterre, at 19.5 kilometers north of the Zec de Kipawa and 64 km south of Rouyn-Noranda.

The key neighboring drainage slopes are:

- North side: Ottawa River, Darlens River, Kinojévis River and Serment River;
- Side: Ottawa River, lake Nodiere and lake des Fourches (lac Fork);
- South side: Lake Devlin, Soufflot lake, lake aux Sables and Blondeau River;
- West side: Ottawa River, Grassy Lake, Lake Roger and Des Quinze Lake.

The Ottawa River flows on the north shore of Lac Simard (near the "tip of the Chasse-Galerie") and travels on 6.7 kilometers to the west across Lake Simard. Upstream, the waters of this river are coming from Decelles Reservoir, located east of the lake. From this reservoir, downstream, the river is fed by rivers Darlens, Kinojévis and Roger.

With several islands, Lake Simard proves to be an outgrowth of the Ottawa River. The north shore of lake forms two large curves; while the south coast has several bays: Bay of Deer River (French: baie de la rivière Chevreuil), Bay Klock, Poverty Bay and Bay Snags (baie des Chicots).

The municipality of Laforce and Aboriginal settlement of Winneway extend on its southern shore.

== Toponymy ==
In 1928, the "Commission géographique du Québec" (Geographic Board of Quebec) formalized this name that evokes the work of Télesphore Simard. Born in 1863 in Saint-Joachim near Quebec City, he graduated as a surveyor in 1887 at Laval University.

Working for the Government of Quebec, Simard explored the rivers of the North Coast and Temiscamingue. In 1911, he conducted the survey of villages in the new riding of Abitibi. In 1916, he ran as a Liberal candidate in the provincial election. Elected in Témiscamingue riding, Simard served until his death in 1924 at Ville-Marie in his riding.

In the early twentieth century, the Algonquin name "Mijicowaja" (meaning a slightly extended lake) designated "Lake Simard". This name will be replaced by the English name "Expanse", probably as a result of the construction, circa 1912, of a dam on rapid of the Fifteen (French: Rapides des Quinze); which would significantly increase the surface area of the lake.

In its 1895 report, the explorer John Bignell used the name Winowa to designate the lake. The word that comes close to Algonquin Winneway, meaning "white water" refers to a particular bay and an island in the southeast of Lake Simard.

The name Lake Simard was formalized on December 5, 1968, at the "Bank of place names" of the Commission de toponymie du Québec (Quebec Names Board).

== See also ==
- Ottawa River, a stream
- Lake Timiskaming, a body of water
