= Lac des Quinze =

Lake in Angliers, Quebec, Canada

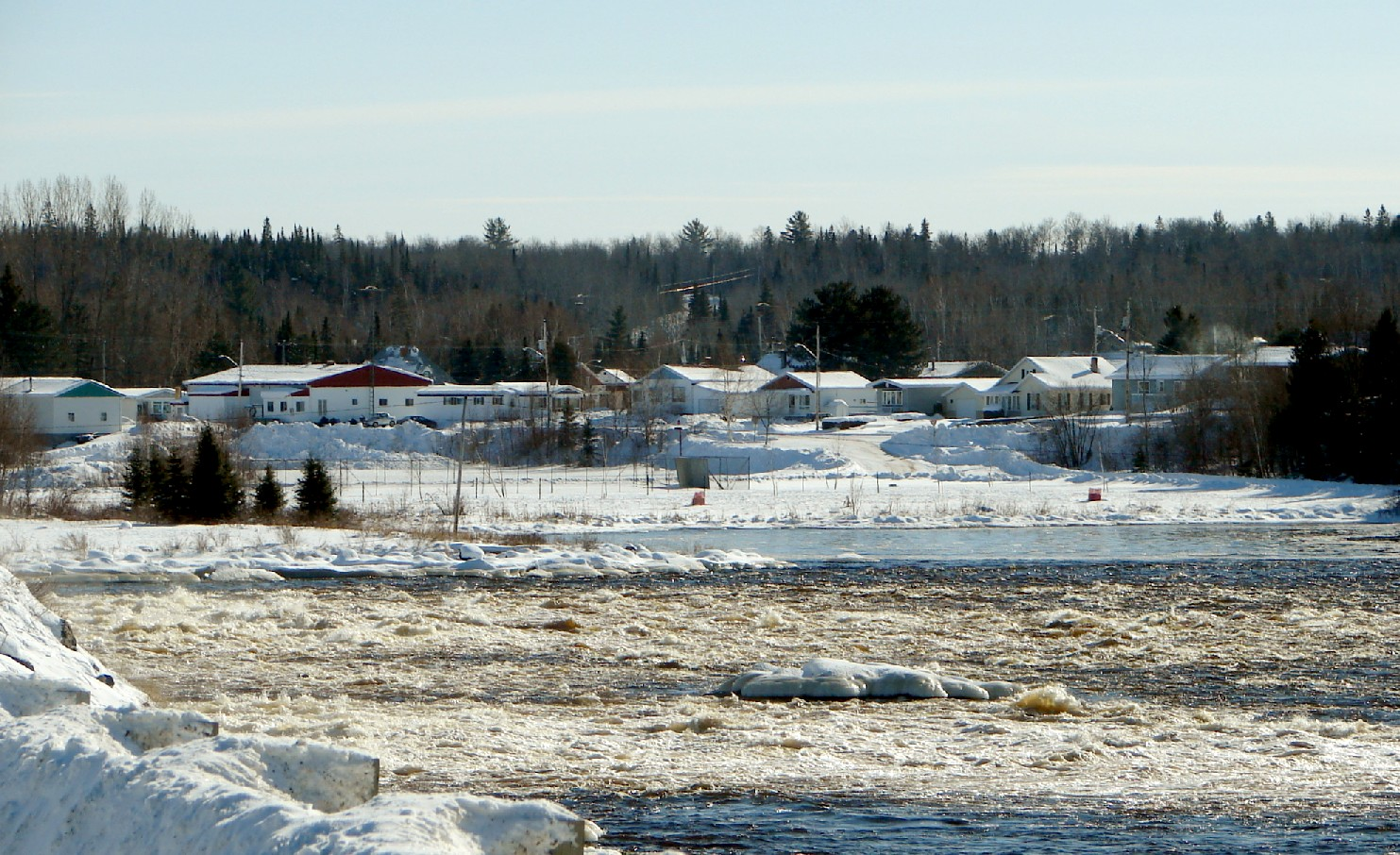
- The Ottawa River at the outlet of Lac des Quinze at Laverlochère-Angliers.

- Location within Quebec Location within Canada
- Location: Témiscamingue
- Coordinates: 47°32′52″N 79°07′26″W
- Primary inflows: Ottawa River, Little Roger River, Fraser River (Ottawa River), McFadden River
- Primary outflows: Ottawa River
- Basin countries: Canada
- Max. length: 52 km (32 mi)
- Max. width: 11 km (6.8 mi)
- Surface area: 145 km^{2} (56 sq mi)
- Surface elevation: 258 m (846 ft)
- Islands: Morris (facing Allard Bay), Du Chenal Blind (near the dam of Laverlochère-Angliers), Frigon, Fox, Jumelles, Squelette (facing Sèche Bay)

The Lac des Quinze (French pronunciation: [lak de kɛ̃z]) is a freshwater body extending into the municipalities of Moffet, Laverlochère-Angliers, Latulipe-et-Gaboury, Quebec, Guérin, and Rémigny in the Témiscamingue (RCM), in the Abitibi-Témiscamingue administrative region, in Quebec, in Canada.

== Geography ==
Covering 145 kilometres (90.10 mi) and forming a large open crescent to the North, "Lac des Quinze" is a major expansion of the Ottawa River. With a length of 52 kilometres (32 mi) and a maximum width of 11 kilometres (6.8 mi), "Lac des Quinze" gets its supply on the East side by the Ottawa River which crosses Lac Simard (Temiscamingue) (altitude: 263 m) and Grassy Lake (Témiscamingue).

In addition, "Lac des Quinze" is powered by:

- South side: the Fraser River that flows into Gillies Bay, one of many bays created by the particular configuration of the water body;
- East side: McFadden River (coming from the South) draining the waters of Rondelet Lake and Béquille Creek;
- North side: the outlet of lakes Lébret, Rocher, Martin, Petit lac Perreault, Beaumesnil Lake, Klock and Wasps; the waters of the Little Roger River which drains the lakes Beaudry lake, Gérin-Lajoie, Gaboury and the Langelier; discharge of a series of lakes located north of the village of Rémigny, Quebec.

After crossing the "Lac des Quinze", the current of the Ottawa River leaves the Baie Perron to flow on 24 kilometres (15 mi) (at the limit of the municipalities of Guérin and from Saint-Eugène-de-Guigues, Quebec) westerly through a series of rapids: Cypress, Kakake, Islands and Fifteen. At the end of this segment of the river, the current flows through the "First Fall" near the village of Notre-Dame-du-Nord, Quebec. Then the waters flow to the west, in Paulson Bay north of Lake Timiskaming.

The municipalities administering the territory of "Lac des Quinze" are: Guérin (northern part) and Laverlochère-Angliers (southwestern part) and Latulipe-et-Gaboury, Quebec (for Gillies Bay, at the extreme South). The shape of the lake surrounds by the southwest Lac des Quinze Biodiversity Reserve, located in the territory of Laverlochère-Angliers. This reserve stops in the East at the Little Roger River and in the North, at "Des Wasps Lake". A bay of "Lac des Quinze", deep in 6.4 kilometres (4.0 mi), stretches northward in the middle of the reserve territory.

== Toponymy ==
A March 1868 survey report by Lindsay Russell reports the "Lac des Quinze". The origin of the name of the lake and the "Des Quinze River" is explained in another survey report dated May 1873 by Walter McOuat, who writes that he "went up the Ottawa to "Lac des Quinze", a distance of about fifteen miles (24 km),... This part of the Outaouais is designated in the locality under the name "Les Quinze", which comes from the fact that, to go up in a canoe, it is necessary to make about fifteen portages "(corresponding to as many cascades or falls).

In the middle of the 19th century, logging in the "Lac des Quinze" sector began at the initiative of logging companies. Between 1884 and 1910, several settlers gradually settled on the south shore of "Lac des Quinze". In 1883, John Morrison, a former employee of the Hudson's Bay Company, built a trading post at Gillies Bay (South of "Lac des Quinze") to trade furs with the Amerindians for others products.

Around 1912, a hydroelectric dam was built on the Ottawa River, at the outlet of Lake Quinze. In 1947, this barrage of "Des Quinze" (English: the Fifteen) will then be raised and three other dams, with power stations, will appear downstream.

The toponym "Lac des Quinze" (in French) was formalized on December 5, 1968, at the Bank of Place Names of the Commission de toponymie du Québec.

== See also ==
- Ottawa River, a watercourse
- Little Roger River, a watercourse
- McFadden River, a watercourse
- Fraser River (Ottawa River), a watercourse
- Lac Simard (Temiscamingue), a body of water
- Grassy Lake (Témiscamingue), a body of water
- Lake Timiskaming, a body of water
- Rémigny Lake, a body of water
- Centrale des Rapides-des-Quinze, a hydroelectric power station
- Biodiversity Reserve of Lake des Quinze
- Laverlochère-Angliers, a municipality
- Moffet, Quebec, a municipality
- Latulipe-et-Gaboury, Quebec, a municipality
- Guérin, Quebec, a municipality
- Rémigny, Quebec, a municipality
- List of lakes in Canada
