= Quebec Route 382 =

Highway in Quebec, Canada

Route 382

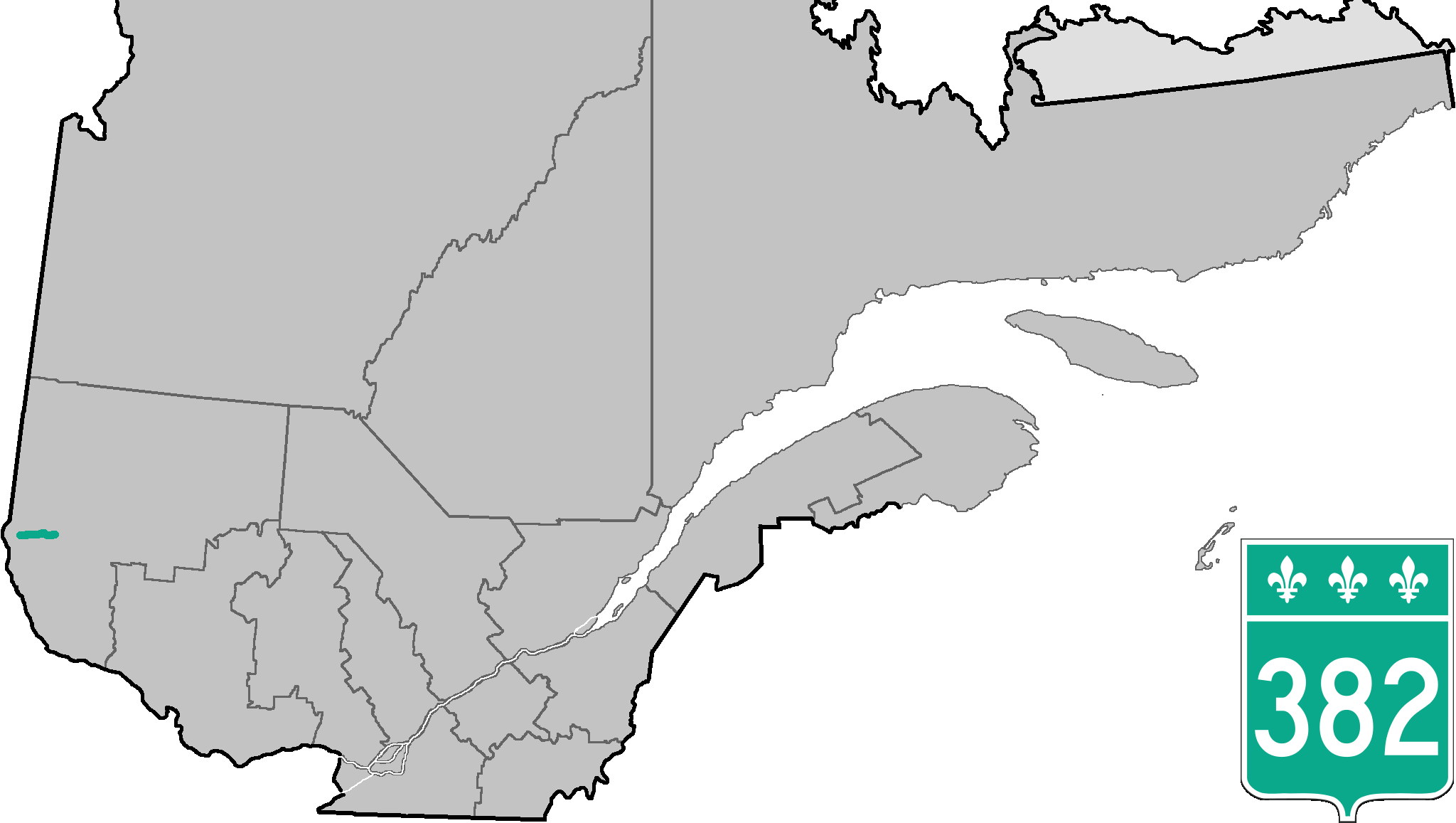

Route information
- Maintained by Transports Québec
- Length: 73 km (45 mi)

Major junctions
- West end: R-101 in Ville-Marie
- East end: 4th Rue in Belleterre

Location
- Country: Canada
- Province: Quebec
- Major cities: Ville-Marie, Lorrainville

Highway system
- Quebec provincial highways; Autoroutes; List; Former
← R-381	→ R-385

Route 382 is a provincial highway located in the Abitibi-Témiscamingue region in southwestern Quebec. The highway runs from Ville-Marie at the junction of Route 101 and ends south of Laforce. Between Lorrainville and Laverlochère-Angliers it overlaps Route 391.

== Towns along Route 382 ==
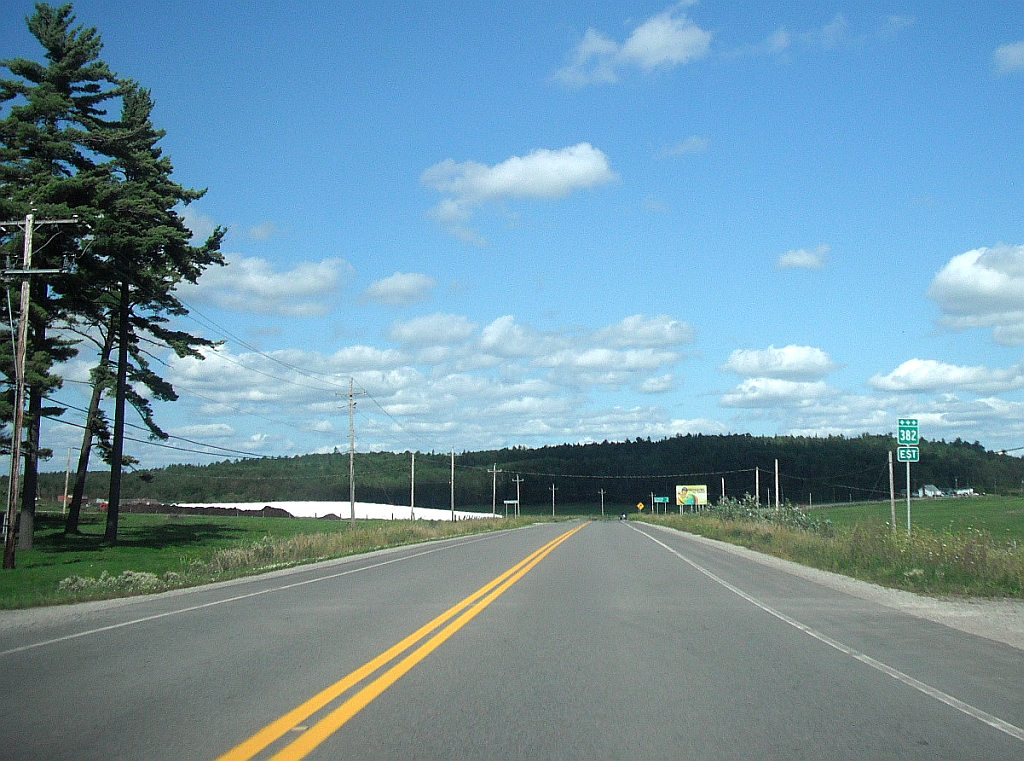
Quebec Route 382 in Ville-Marie

- Ville-Marie
- Duhamel-Ouest
- Lorrainville
- Laverlochère-Angliers
- Fugèreville
- Latulipe-et-Gaboury
- Belleterre

== Major intersections ==
The entire route is in Témiscamingue RCM.

Location	km	mi	Destinations	Notes
Ville-Marie	0	0.0	R-101 – Témiscaming, Rouyn-Noranda	Western terminus
Lorrainville			R-391 south – Béarn	Begin/end concurrency with Route 391
Lorrainville			R-391 north – Saint-Eugène-de-Guigues	Begin/end concurrency with Route 391
Belleterre	45.4	28.2	4th Rue	Eastern terminus
1.000 mi = 1.609 km; 1.000 km = 0.621 mi

== See also ==
- List of Quebec provincial highways
