= Hunter's Point, Quebec =

Hunter's Point
- Native settlement
- Location within Quebec
- Coordinates: 47°00′N 78°48′W
- Country: Canada
- Province: Quebec
- Region: Abitibi-Témiscamingue
- RCM: Témiscamingue

Government
  - Chief: Lisa Robinson (Wolf Lake First Nation)
  - Federal riding: Abitibi—Témiscamingue
  - Prov. riding: Rouyn-Noranda–Témiscamingue

Area
  - Land: 1.30 km^{2} (0.50 sq mi)

Population (2021)
  - Total: 5
  - Density: 3.8/km^{2} (9.8/sq mi)
  - Change (2016-2021): ▼50%
  - Dwellings: 28
- Time zone: UTC−05:00 (EST)
  - Summer (DST): UTC−04:00 (EDT)

Hunter's Point is a native settlement in the Abitibi-Témiscamingue region of Quebec, Canada. It is geographically located within the territory of Témiscamingue Regional County Municipality. Its population was 5 in the 2021 Canadian census. In Algonquin, the place is known as Opacikoteak Ecitacikewapan, which means "village built on high mountains".

The community, located on the shores of its namesake lake, is not in an Native reserve. It is seasonally occupied by members of the Wolf Lake First Nation (registered population, 255) who otherwise live in the Timiskaming and Kebaowek reserves.

== History ==
Originally the settlement was located 20 km (12 mi) south on Hunter Lake. This place was called Hunter's Lodge and had a trading post operated by the Hudson's Bay Company from 1846 on. The lake and the post were probably named after James S. Hunter, who was administrator of the post at that time.

Around 1869, another member of the Hunter family, George, left Hunter's Lodge and moved to Hunter's Point. He managed to attract enough people to open a post office in 1886 (which closed in 1970). The popularity of the new site likely led to the closure of Hunter's Lodge trading post in 1890.
