= Lorrainville =

- Municipality
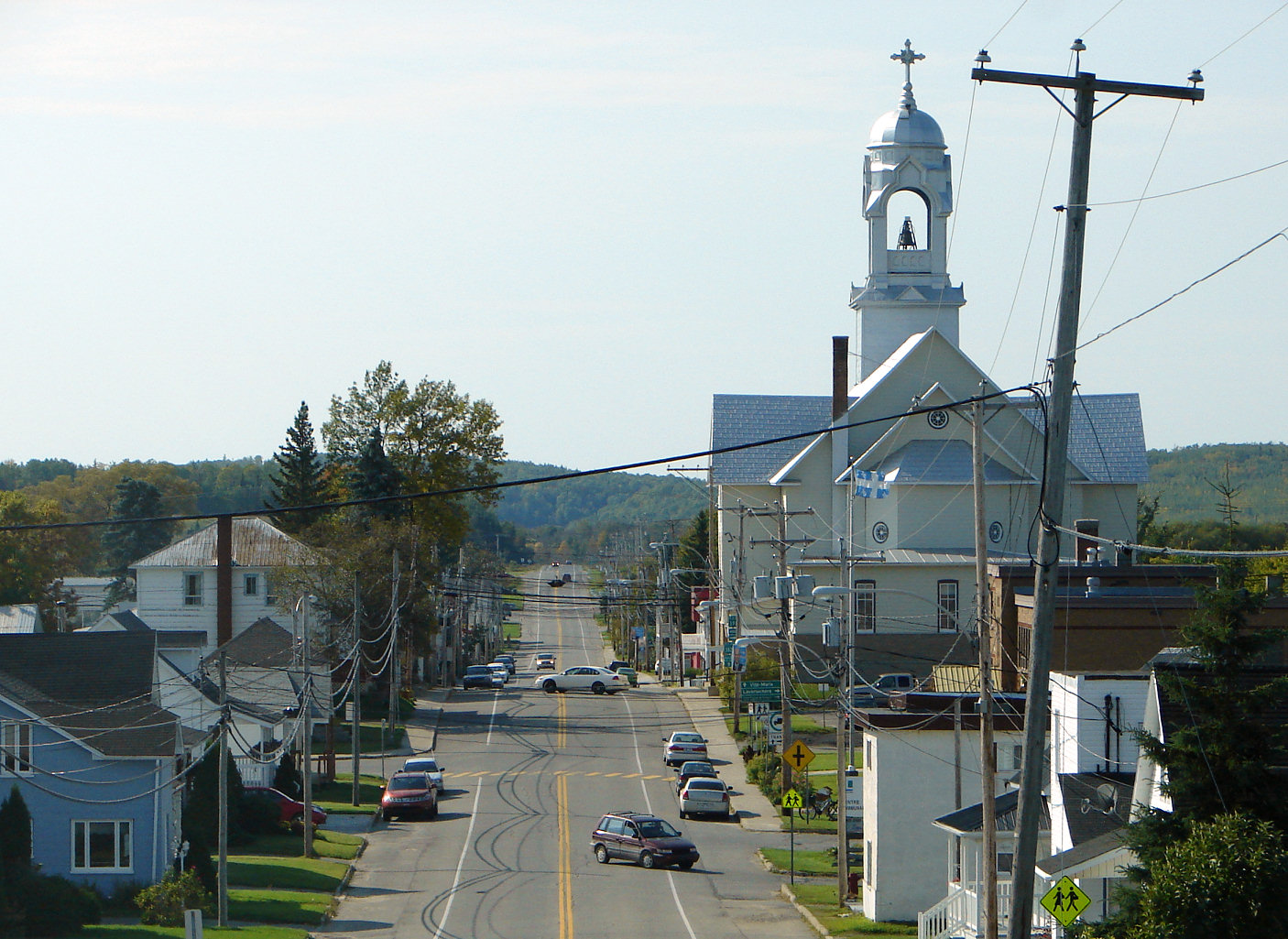

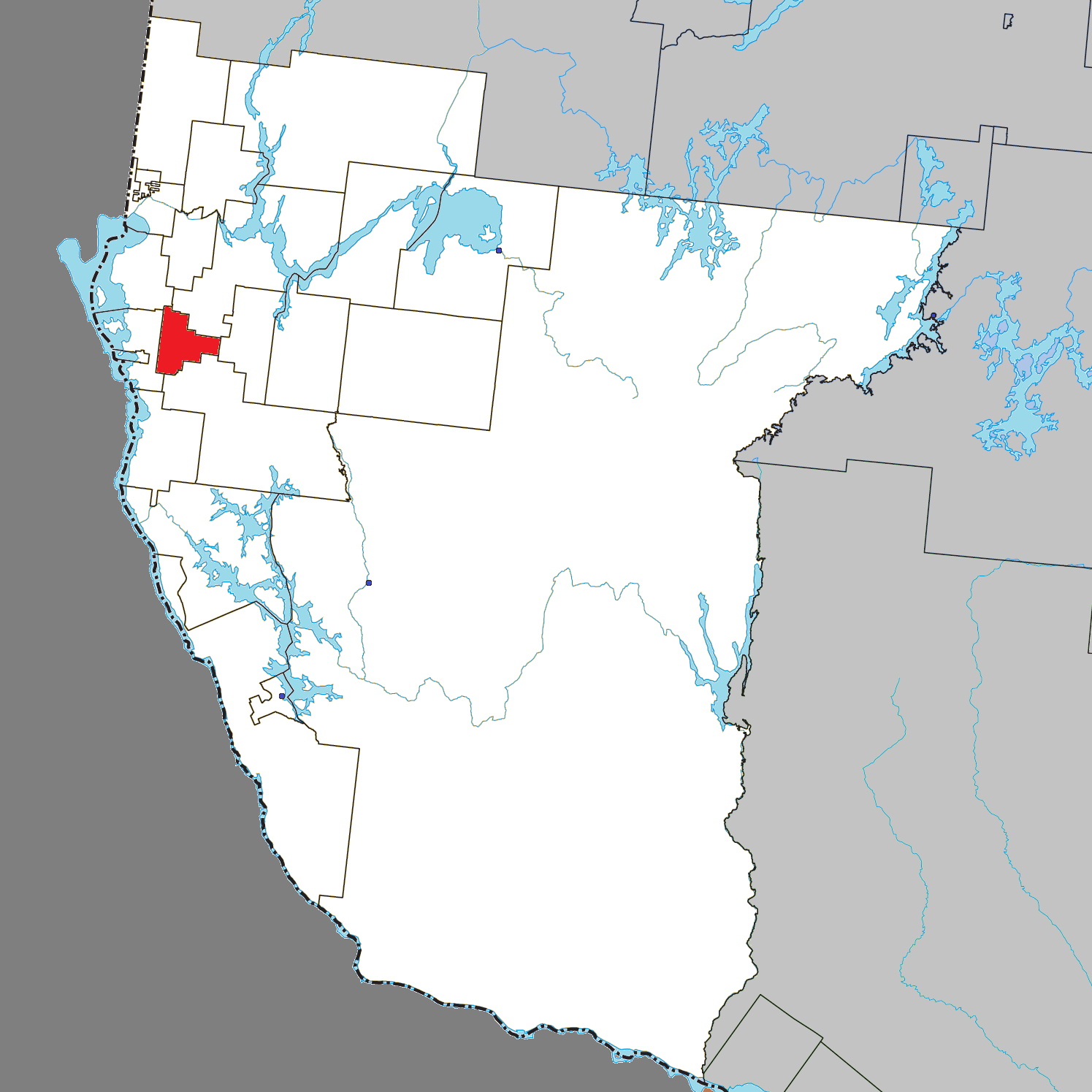
- Location within Témiscamingue RCM

- Location in western Quebec
- Coordinates: 47°21′N 79°21′W
- Country: Canada
- Province: Quebec
- Region: Abitibi-Témiscamingue
- RCM: Témiscamingue
- Settled: 1883
- Constituted: February 16, 1994

Government
  - Mayor: Jean Martineau
  - Federal riding: Abitibi—Témiscamingue
  - Prov. riding: Rouyn-Noranda–Témiscamingue

Area
  - Total: 87.64 km^{2} (33.84 sq mi)
  - Land: 87.91 km^{2} (33.94 sq mi)
- There is an apparent contradiction between two authoritative sources.

Population (2021)
  - Total: 1,286
  - Density: 14.6/km^{2} (38/sq mi)
  - Pop (2016–21): ▲1.1%
  - Dwellings: 602
- Time zone: UTC−05:00 (EST)
  - Summer (DST): UTC−04:00 (EDT)
- Postal code(s): J0Z 2R0
- Area code: 819
- Highways: R-382 R-391
- Website: municipalites-du-quebec.com/lorrainville/

Lorrainville (French pronunciation: [lɔʁɛ̃vil]) is a municipality in northwestern Quebec, Canada, in the Témiscamingue Regional County Municipality.

== History ==
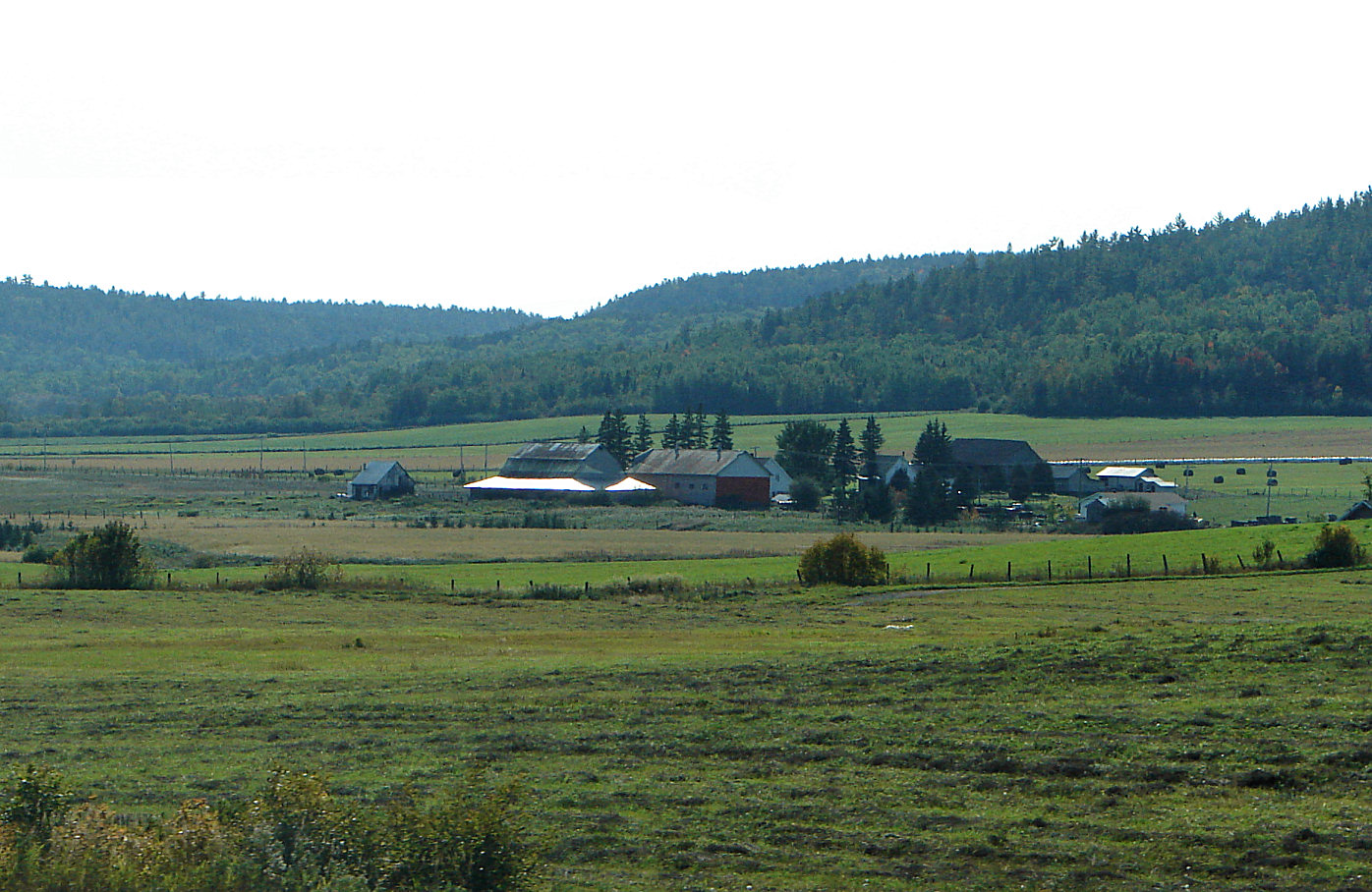
Countryside outside Lorrainville

The geographic township of Duhamel, created in 1877 (named after Joseph-Thomas Duhamel), was opened for colonization in 1884. The settlement was named after Narcisse-Zéphirin Lorrain (1842-1915), bishop of Pembroke at that time. In 1889, its post office opened. The place saw significant growth in 1905, when it became an important agricultural centre. In 1910, the Parish of Notre-Dame-de-Lourdes-de-Lorrainville was established. In 1912, the Parish Municipality of Notre-Dame-de-Lorrainville was created when it separated from the Township Municipality of Duhamel and the United Township Municipality of Laverlochère et Baby, with Joseph Bellehumour as its first mayor. It was later renamed to Notre-Dame-de-Lourdes-de-Lorrainville.

In 1930, the village centre of the parish municipality separated to become the Village Municipality of Lorrainville, with Eddy Guimond as its first mayor. In 1994, these two entities rejoined again to become the Municipality of Lorrainville.

== Geography ==
=== Climate ===
Climate data for Lorrainville
Month	Jan	Feb	Mar	Apr	May	Jun	Jul	Aug	Sep	Oct	Nov	Dec	Year
Record high °C (°F)	11.7 (53.1)	12.0 (53.6)	22.2 (72.0)	30.6 (87.1)	35.6 (96.1)	37.8 (100.0)	40.0 (104.0)	36.7 (98.1)	33.3 (91.9)	28.9 (84.0)	23.3 (73.9)	16.0 (60.8)	40.0 (104.0)
Mean daily maximum °C (°F)	−8.7 (16.3)	−6.2 (20.8)	−0.2 (31.6)	9.0 (48.2)	17.3 (63.1)	22.3 (72.1)	24.6 (76.3)	23.2 (73.8)	17.5 (63.5)	10.5 (50.9)	2.0 (35.6)	−4.6 (23.7)	8.9 (48.0)
Daily mean °C (°F)	−15 (5)	−12.8 (9.0)	−6.4 (20.5)	2.9 (37.2)	10.5 (50.9)	15.7 (60.3)	18.3 (64.9)	17.1 (62.8)	12.3 (54.1)	6.0 (42.8)	−1.8 (28.8)	−9.6 (14.7)	3.1 (37.6)
Mean daily minimum °C (°F)	−21.3 (−6.3)	−19.5 (−3.1)	−12.6 (9.3)	−3.3 (26.1)	3.7 (38.7)	9.1 (48.4)	12.0 (53.6)	11.1 (52.0)	7.0 (44.6)	1.3 (34.3)	−5.6 (21.9)	−14.7 (5.5)	−2.7 (27.1)
Record low °C (°F)	−50.0 (−58.0)	−50.0 (−58.0)	−41.1 (−42.0)	−28.3 (−18.9)	−15.0 (5.0)	−4.4 (24.1)	−1.7 (28.9)	−2.2 (28.0)	−6.0 (21.2)	−15.0 (5.0)	−36.7 (−34.1)	−43.9 (−47.0)	−50.0 (−58.0)
Average precipitation mm (inches)	51.4 (2.02)	35.8 (1.41)	49.9 (1.96)	58.0 (2.28)	78.6 (3.09)	89.9 (3.54)	87.7 (3.45)	96.4 (3.80)	85.4 (3.36)	88.6 (3.49)	64.5 (2.54)	50.4 (1.98)	836.5 (32.93)
Source: Environment Canada (based on Ville-Marie weather station)

== Demographics ==
Canada census – Lorrainville community profile

	2021	2016	2011
Population	1,286 (+1.1% from 2016)	1,272 (-4.2% from 2011)	1,272 (-4.0% from 2006)
Land area	87.91 km^{2} (33.94 sq mi)	87.94 km^{2} (33.95 sq mi)	88.12 km^{2} (34.02 sq mi)
Population density	14.6/km^{2} (38/sq mi)	14.5/km^{2} (38/sq mi)	14.4/km^{2} (37/sq mi)
Median age	42.4 (M: 42.8, F: 42.4)	44.5 (M: 44.2, F: 45.0)	42.4 (M: 41.3, F: 43.4)
Private dwellings	602 (total) 570 (occupied)	609 (total) 556 (occupied)	564 (total) 533 (occupied)
Median household income	$67,000	$54,720	$56,265

References: 2021 2016 2011

Historical census populations – Lorrainville
Year	Pop.	±%
1996	1,507	—
2001	1,411	−6.4%
2006	1,325	−6.1%
2011	1,328	+0.2%
2016	1,272	−4.2%
2021	1,286	+1.1%
Population figures based on revised counts. Source: Statistics Canada

Mother tongue (2021):

- English as first language: 0.8%
- French as first language: 97.7%
- English and French as first language: 1.2%
- Other as first language: 0.4%

== Government ==
List of former mayors (since formation of current municipality):

- Philippe Boutin (...–2005, 2009–2013)
- Marc Champagne (2005–2009)
- Simon Gélinas (2013–2023)
- Jean Martineau (2023–present)

== See also ==
- List of municipalities in Quebec
