= Télesphore Simard (Témiscamingue politician) =

Canadian politician

Member of Quebec Assembly for Témiscamingue
- In office 1916–1924

Personal details
- Born: 19 December 1863 Saint-Joachim, Canada East
- Died: 1 October 1924 (aged 60) Ville-Marie, Quebec, Canada
- Spouse: Angélina Morissette (m. 20 May 1889)

Télesphore Simard (19 December 1863 – 1 October 1924) was a Canadian politician, the member of the Legislative Assembly of Quebec for Témiscamingue riding from 1916 until his death in office in 1924.

Educated at the Séminaire de Québec and the Université Laval, Simard went on to work as a surveyor for the Government of Quebec.

Simard Lake in northwestern Quebec was named in his honour.
