= Nédélec =

- Township municipality
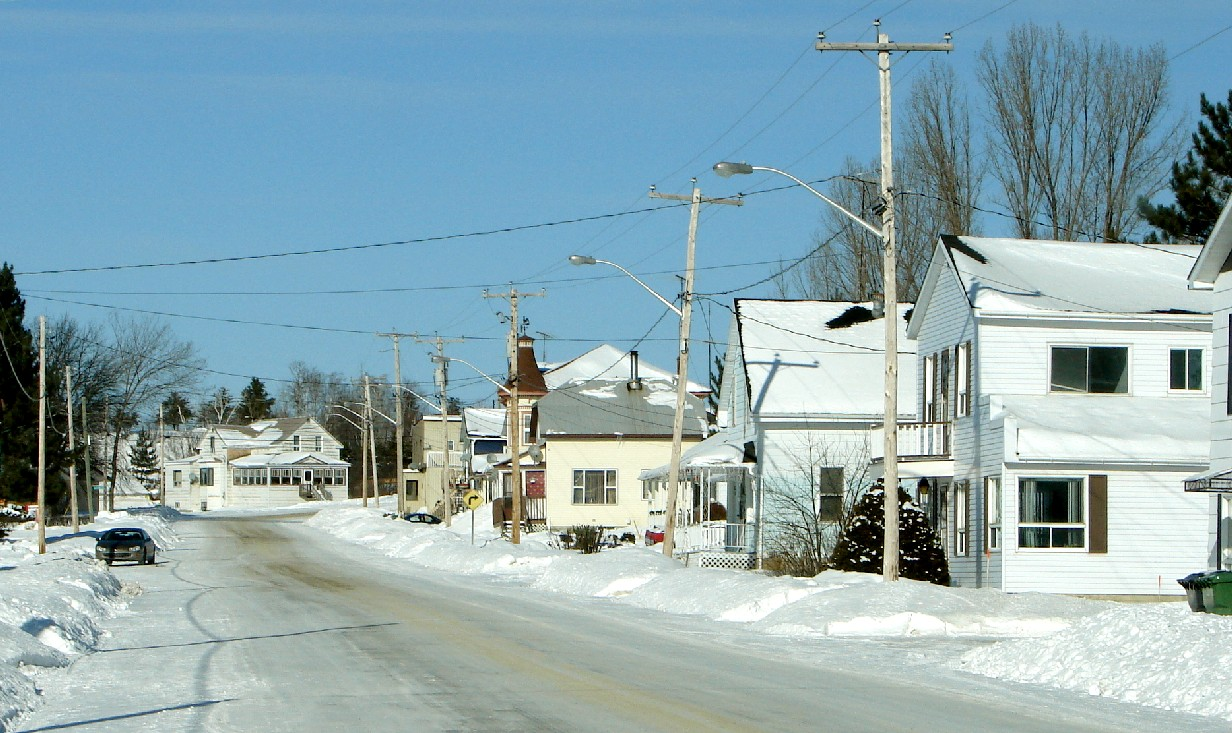

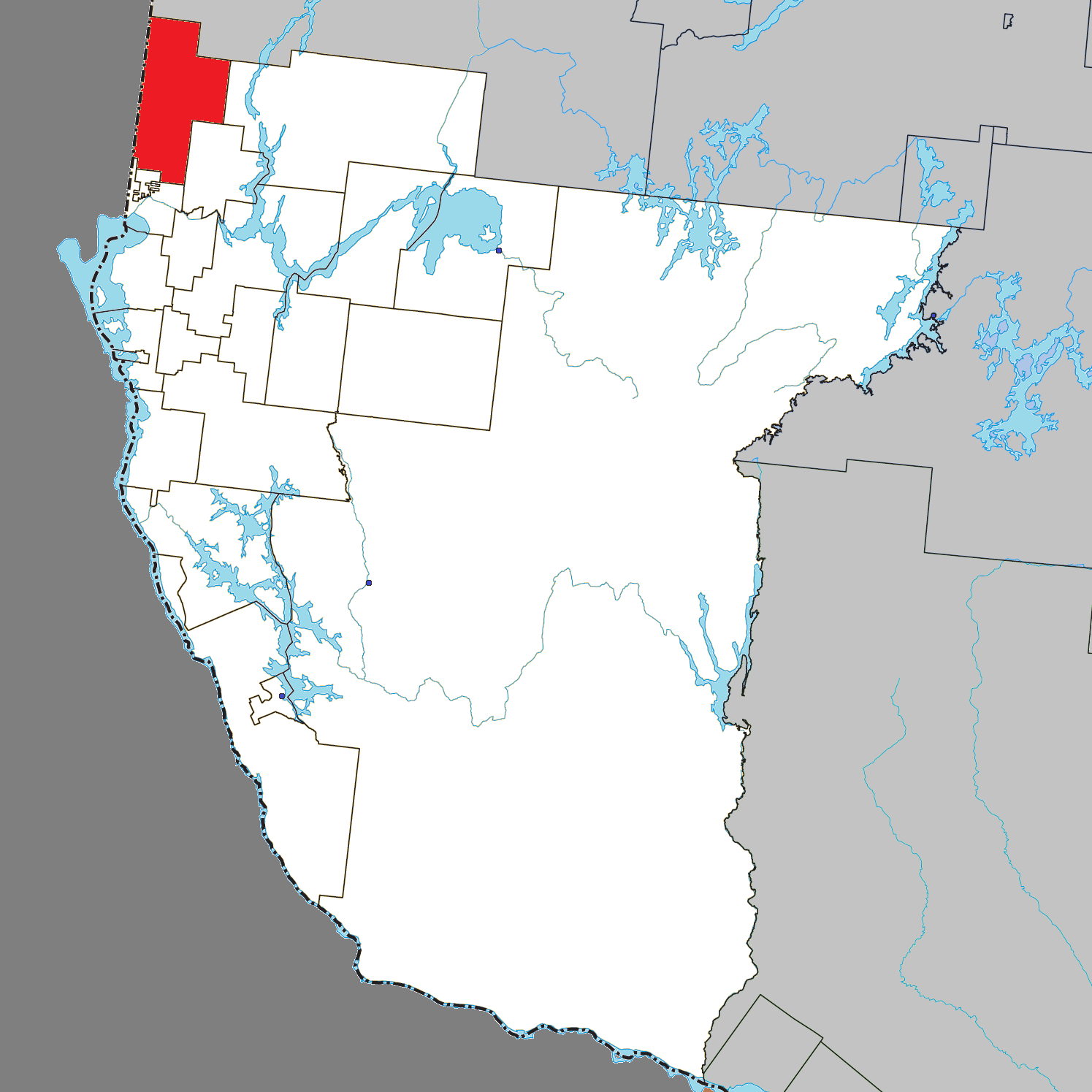
- Location within Témiscamingue RCM

- Location in western Quebec
- Coordinates: 47°41′N 79°26′W
- Country: Canada
- Province: Quebec
- Region: Abitibi-Témiscamingue
- RCM: Témiscamingue
- Settled: 1895
- Constituted: February 1, 1909
- Named for: Jean-Marie Nédélec

Government
  - Mayor: Lyne Ash
  - Federal riding: Abitibi—Témiscamingue
  - Prov. riding: Rouyn-Noranda–Témiscamingue

Area
  - Total: 375.14 km^{2} (144.84 sq mi)
  - Land: 371.49 km^{2} (143.43 sq mi)

Population (2021)
  - Total: 340
  - Density: 0.9/km^{2} (2.3/sq mi)
  - Pop (2016-21): ▼4.5%
  - Dwellings: 168
- Time zone: UTC−05:00 (EST)
  - Summer (DST): UTC−04:00 (EDT)
- Postal code(s): J0Z 2Z0
- Area code: 819
- Highways: R-101
- Website: municipalite.nedelec.qc.ca

Nédélec (French pronunciation: [nedelɛk]) is a township municipality in western Quebec, Canada, in the Témiscamingue Regional County Municipality.

The name of the municipality recalls the name of Jean-Marie Nédélec who was an oblate and a missionary with the Algonquins in the region. His last name is from the Breton word Nedeleg which means Christmas.

== History ==
By 1895, a general store was supplying the many logging camps of the area. The first permanent settlers arrived in 1909, the same year the township and township municipality were formed. They were both named after Jean-Marie Nédélec (1834-1896) who was a missionary among the Algonquin First Nations of Lake Timiskaming and Lake Abitibi from 1867 to 1869 and from 1892 to 1896.

On October 7, 1995, the unorganized territory of Roulier, named after Ulric Roulier who was priest at Nédélec in the mid-1930s, was added to the municipality.

== Demographics ==
In the 2021 Census of Population conducted by Statistics Canada, Nédélec had a population of 340 living in 152 of its 168 total private dwellings, a change of −4.5% from its 2016 population of 356. With a land area of 371.49 km^{2} (143.43 sq mi), it had a population density of 0.9/km^{2} (2.4/sq mi) in 2021.

Canada census – Nédélec community profile

	2021	2016	2011
Population	340 (-4.5% from 2016)	356 (-11.7% from 2011)	403 (-3.1% from 2006)
Land area	371.49 km^{2} (143.43 sq mi)	374.10 km^{2} (144.44 sq mi)	374.06 km^{2} (144.43 sq mi)
Population density	0.9/km^{2} (2.3/sq mi)	1.0/km^{2} (2.6/sq mi)	1.1/km^{2} (2.8/sq mi)
Median age	50.0 (M: 53.2, F: 47.2)	48.9 (M: 51.1, F: 45.2)	43.5 (M: 45.0, F: 40.9)
Private dwellings	168 (total) 152 (occupied)	181 (total) 159 (occupied)	175 (total) 165 (occupied)
Median household income	$63,200	$50,240	$35,890

References: 2021 2016 2011

Historical census populations – Nédélec

Year	Pop.	±%
1911	727	—
1921	1,002	+37.8%
1931	654	−34.7%
1941	639	−2.3%
1951	990	+54.9%
1956	1,075	+8.6%
1961	1,019	−5.2%

Year	Pop.	±%
1966	957	−6.1%
1971	719	−24.9%
1976	619	−13.9%
1981	553	−10.7%
1986	490	−11.4%
1991	457	−6.7%
1996	474	+3.7%

Year	Pop.	±%
2001	429	−9.5%
2006	416	−3.0%
2011	403	−3.1%
2016	356	−11.7%
2021	340	−4.5%

Population counts are not adjusted for boundary changes.
Source: Statistics Canada

Mother tongue (2021):

- English as first language: 10.3%
- French as first language: 88.2%
- English and French as first language: 0%
- Other as first language: 1.5%

== See also ==
- List of anglophone communities in Quebec
- List of township municipalities in Quebec
