= Beaudry =

Beaudry is a surname. Notable people with the surname include:

- Catherine Beaudry, Canadian social scientist
- Jean-Louis Beaudry (1809–1886), Canadian entrepreneur and politician from Quebec; thrice mayor of Montreal
- Marcel Beaudry (1933–2012), Canadian lawyer, politician and public official from Quebec; mayor of Hull 1991–1992, former chairperson and CEO of the National Capital Commission 1992–2006
- Prudent Beaudry (1818–1893), Canadian-American politician; mayor of Los Angeles 1874–76
- Roland Beaudry (1906–1964), Canadian politician from Quebec; member of Parliament 1945–48
- Roméo Beaudry (1882–1932), French-Canadian author, composer, and pianist
- Rouville Beaudry (1904–1997), Canadian politician from Quebec; provincial legislator 1935–38

== See also ==
- Métro Beaudry, a subway station on Montreal's Green Line
