= Quebec Route 385 =

Highway in Quebec, Canada

Route 385

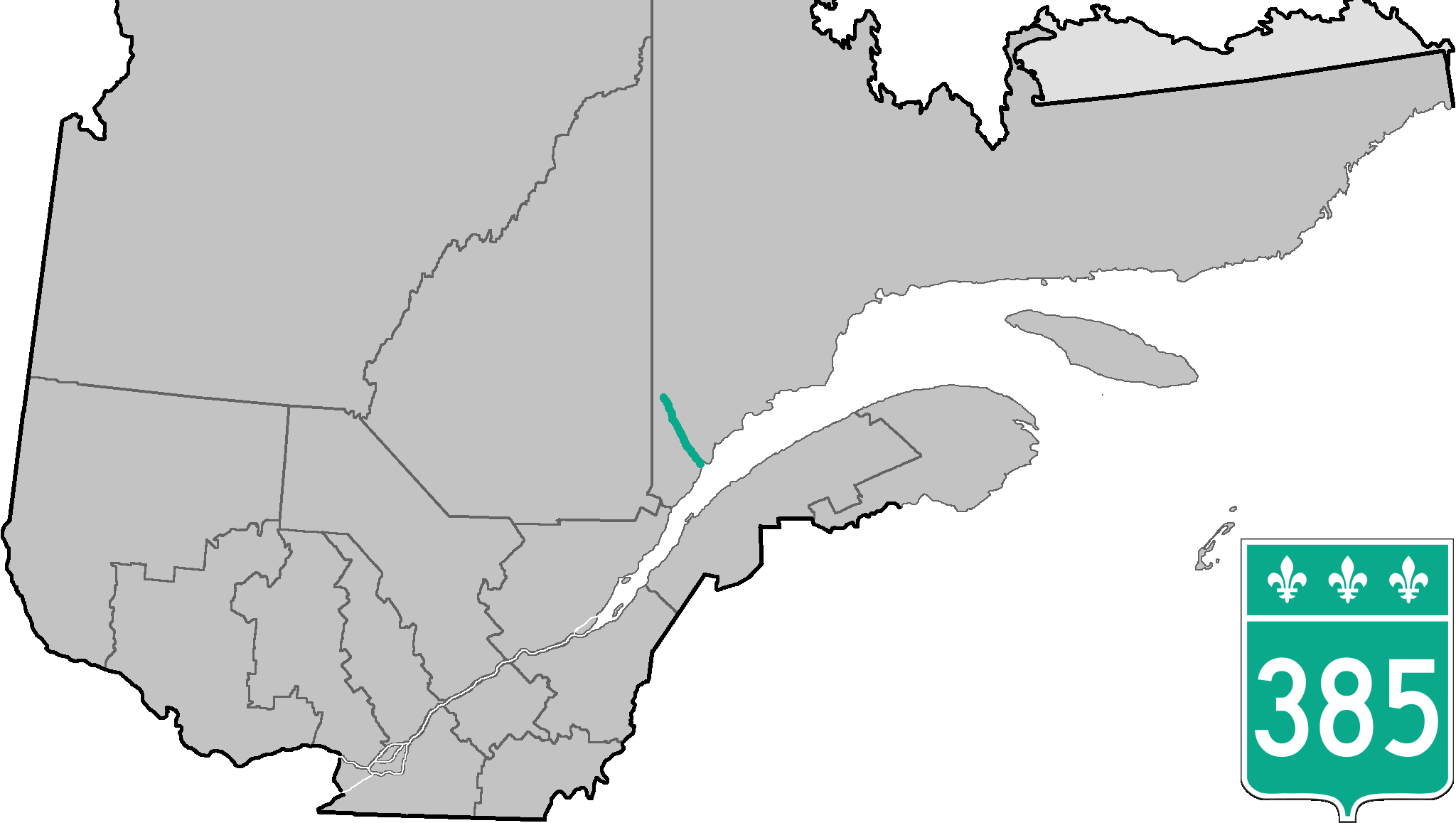

Route information
- Maintained by Transports Québec
- Length: 84 km (52 mi)

Major junctions
- South end: R-138 in Forestville
- North end: Labrieville

Location
- Country: Canada
- Province: Quebec
- Major cities: Forestville

Highway system
- Quebec provincial highways; Autoroutes; List; Former
← R-382	→ R-386

Route 385 is a provincial highway located in the Côte-Nord region in eastern Quebec. The highway runs from the junction of Route 138 in Forestville and ends over 80 kilometers further north into large wooded areas which the main purpose of the road is for the wood industry in the Côte-Nord region.

== Towns along Route 385 ==
- Forestville
- Labrieville

== See also ==
- List of Quebec provincial highways
