= Catherine Beaudry =

Canadian social scientist

Catherine Beaudry is a Canadian social scientist, currently a Full Professor and Canada Research Chair at Polytechnique Montréal. She is an alumna of the Global Young Academy from 2010 to 2014. She completed a Bachelor of Engineering degree in electrical engineering with a specialization in satellite technology at Polytechnique Montréal followed by graduate and doctoral studies in economics at the University of Oxford as a Rhodes Scholar.
