= Guérin, Quebec =

Guérin
- Township municipality
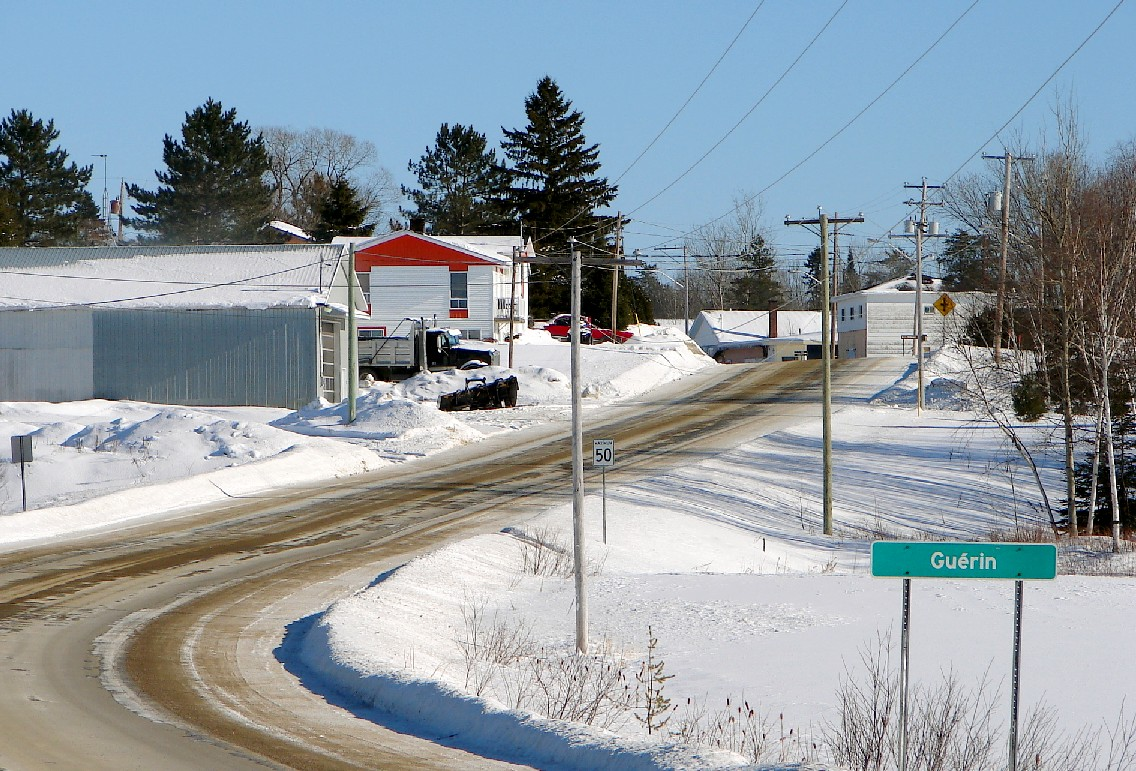
- Entrance of Guérin

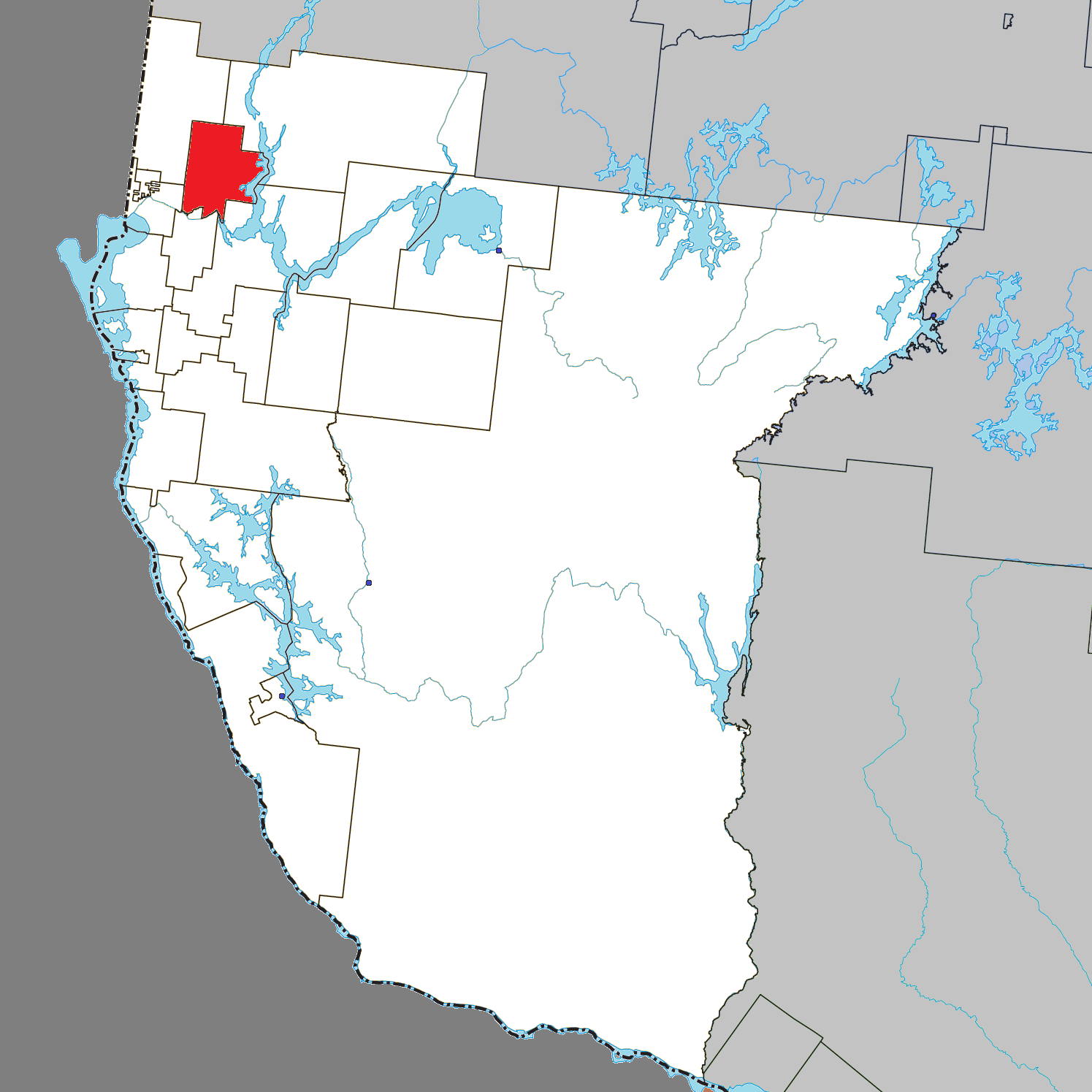
- Location within Témiscamingue RCM

- Location in western Quebec
- Coordinates: 47°39′32″N 79°19′05″W
- Country: Canada
- Province: Quebec
- Region: Abitibi-Témiscamingue
- RCM: Témiscamingue
- Constituted: November 8, 1911
- Named for: James John Edmund Guérin

Government
  - Mayor: Roger Bouthillette
  - Federal riding: Abitibi—Témiscamingue
  - Prov. riding: Rouyn-Noranda–Témiscamingue

Area
  - Total: 208.39 km^{2} (80.46 sq mi)
  - Land: 188.52 km^{2} (72.79 sq mi)

Population (2021)
  - Total: 333
  - Density: 1.8/km^{2} (4.7/sq mi)
  - Pop (2016–21): ▲4.1%
  - Dwellings: 210
- Time zone: UTC−05:00 (EST)
  - Summer (DST): UTC−04:00 (EDT)
- Postal code(s): J0Z 2E0
- Area code: 819
- Highways: R-391
- Website: municipalites-du-quebec.ca/guerin/

Guérin (French pronunciation: [ɡeʁɛ̃]) is a township municipality in northwestern Quebec, Canada, in the Témiscamingue Regional County Municipality.

The township lies within the Ottawa River basin, having an elevation of 210 metres (690 ft) near the Quinze rapids to 336 metres (1,102 ft) in its north-eastern part. In addition to the main namesake village, the township also includes the hamlet of Paquin (47°37′59″N 79°18′51″W).

== History ==
Around 1872, the area began to be cleared for logging and agriculture. In 1904, the geographic township of Guérin was proclaimed, named after James John Edmund Guerin, while the settlement was called Lalemant, in honour of Gabriel Lalemant. The Lalement Post Office opened in 1908, and that same year, the parish of Saint-Gabriel-de-Guérin was founded. In 1911, the Township Municipality of Guérin was formed from previously unincorporated territory. In 1921, the settlement and post office were renamed to Guérin.

== Demographics ==
In the 2021 Census of Population conducted by Statistics Canada, Guérin had a population of 333 living in 134 of its 210 total private dwellings, a change of 4.1% from its 2016 population of 320. With a land area of 188.52 km^{2} (72.79 sq mi), it had a population density of 1.8/km^{2} (4.6/sq mi) in 2021.

Historical census populations – Guérin, Quebec

Year	Pop.	±%
1921	506	—
1931	771	+52.4%
1941	685	−11.2%
1951	618	−9.8%
1956	621	+0.5%
1961	596	−4.0%

Year	Pop.	±%
1966	581	−2.5%
1971	425	−26.9%
1976	372	−12.5%
1981	268	−28.0%
1986	283	+5.6%
1991	274	−3.2%

Year	Pop.	±%
1996	297	+8.4%
2001	300	+1.0%
2006	295	−1.7%
2011	305	+3.4%
2016	320	+4.9%
2021	333	+4.1%

Source: Statistics Canada

Mother tongue (2021):

- English as first language: 1.5%
- French as first language: 97%
- English and French as first language: 0%
- Other as first language: 1.5%

== See also ==
- List of township municipalities in Quebec
