= Fugèreville =

- Municipality
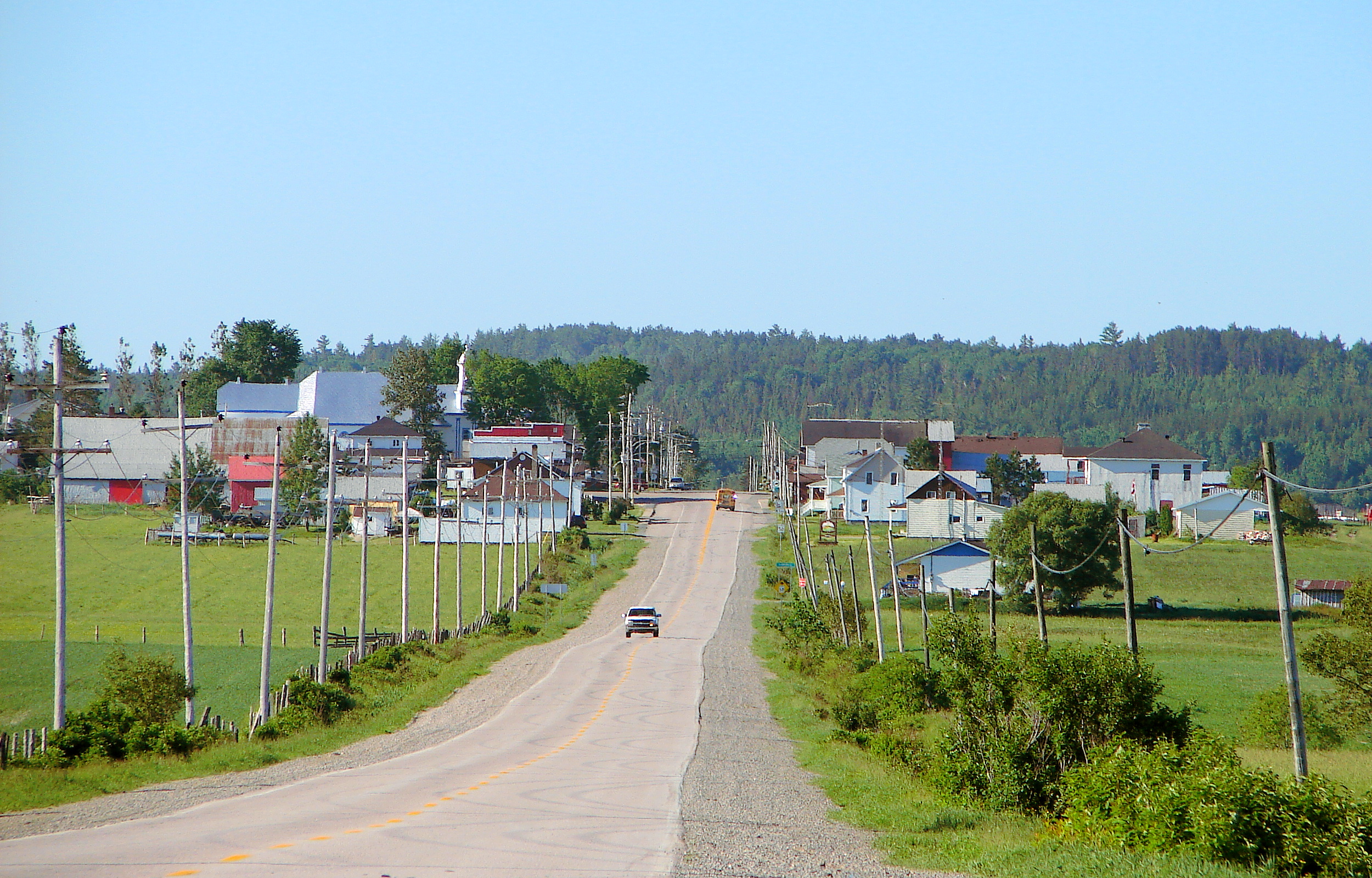
- Motto: The Ball of Memories
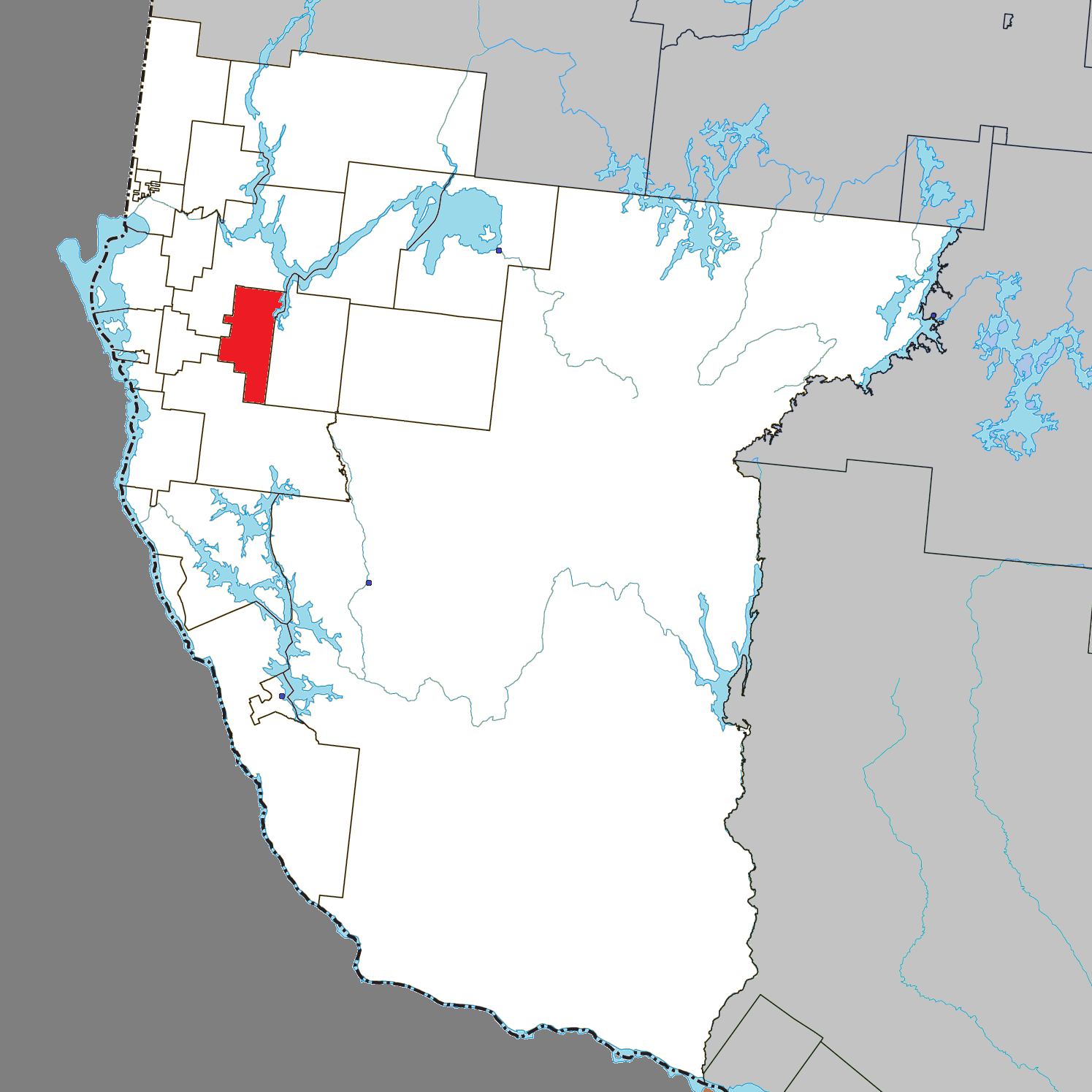
- Location within Témiscamingue RCM

- Location in western Quebec
- Coordinates: 47°24′N 79°12′W
- Country: Canada
- Province: Quebec
- Region: Abitibi-Témiscamingue
- RCM: Témiscamingue
- Settled: 1902
- Constituted: February 5, 1904

Government
  - Mayor: André Pâquet
  - Federal riding: Abitibi—Témiscamingue
  - Prov. riding: Rouyn-Noranda–Témiscamingue

Area
  - Total: 169.15 km^{2} (65.31 sq mi)
  - Land: 157.12 km^{2} (60.66 sq mi)

Population (2021)
  - Total: 326
  - Density: 2.1/km^{2} (5.4/sq mi)
  - Pop (2016–21): 0%
  - Dwellings: 213
- Time zone: UTC−05:00 (EST)
  - Summer (DST): UTC−04:00 (EDT)
- Postal code(s): J0Z 2A0
- Area code: 819
- Highways: R-382
- Website: municipalites-du-quebec.ca/fugereville/index.php

Fugèreville (French pronunciation: [fyʒɛʁvil]) is a municipality in northwestern Quebec, Canada in the Témiscamingue Regional County Municipality.

== History ==
While logging began in the 1880s, settlement of the area began in 1902, then called Stopping Place and later Pont-Rouge. In 1904, it was incorporated as the United Township Municipality of Laverlochère-et-Baby, after the geographic townships in which it is located, in turn named in honour of Jean-Nicolas Laverlochère and Louis François Georges Baby.

In 1912, the Parish of Notre-Dame-du-Mont-Carmel was founded, with Joseph-Armand Fugère as the first parish priest, and in 1914, its post office opened. In 1921, it changed statutes and name to become the Municipality of Fugerville, named after its first priest. In 1969, the spelling was adjusted to Fugèreville.

== Demographics ==
Canada census – Fugèreville community profile

	2021	2016	2011
Population	326 (0.0% from 2016)	326 (-0.9% from 2011)	329 (9.3% from 2006)
Land area	157.12 km^{2} (60.66 sq mi)	156.98 km^{2} (60.61 sq mi)	156.84 km^{2} (60.56 sq mi)
Population density	2.1/km^{2} (5.4/sq mi)	2.1/km^{2} (5.4/sq mi)	2.1/km^{2} (5.4/sq mi)
Median age	47.6 (M: 51.6, F: 43.2)	46.5 (M: 51.3, F: 41.7)	43.8 (M: 50.2, F: 39.2)
Private dwellings	213 (total) 148 (occupied)	222 (total) 138 (occupied)	210 (total) 132 (occupied)
Median household income	$65,500	$56,320	$51,587

References: 2021 2016 2011

Historical census populations – Fugèreville

Year	Pop.	±%
1911	155	—
1921	467	+201.3%
1931	670	+43.5%
1941	681	+1.6%
1951	738	+8.4%
1956	823	+11.5%
1961	812	−1.3%

Year	Pop.	±%
1966	843	+3.8%
1971	660	−21.7%
1976	490	−25.8%
1981	455	−7.1%
1986	420	−7.7%
1991	398	−5.2%
1996	376	−5.5%

Year	Pop.	±%
2001	345	−8.2%
2006	301	−12.8%
2011	329	+9.3%
2016	326	−0.9%
2021	326	+0.0%

Population counts are not adjusted for boundary changes.
Source: Statistics Canada

Mother tongue (2021):

- English as first language: 3.0%
- French as first language: 90.9%
- English and French as first language: 1.5%
- Other as first language: 4.5%

== See also ==
- List of municipalities in Quebec
