= Témiscamingue (provincial electoral district) =

Coordinates: 47.1°N 78.8°W

Quebec electoral district

Defunct provincial electoral district
- Legislature: National Assembly of Quebec
- District created: 1912
- District abolished: 1972
- First contested: 1912
- Last contested: 1970

Témiscamingue is a former provincial electoral district in the Abitibi-Témiscamingue region of Quebec, Canada.

It was created for the 1912 election from part of Pontiac electoral district. its final election was in 1970. It disappeared in the 1973 election and its successor electoral district was Pontiac-Témiscamingue.

From 1912 to 1922, it was also known as Temiscaming.

== Members of the Legislative Assembly / National Assembly ==
- Charles Ramsay Devlin, Liberal, (1912–1916)
- Télesphore Simard, Liberal (1916–1924)
- Joseph Miljours, Liberal (1924–1927)
- Joseph-Édouard Piché, Liberal (1927–1935)
- Nil-Élie Larivière, Action liberale nationale – Union Nationale (1935–1939)
- Paul-Oliva Goulet, Liberal (1939–1944)
- Nil-Élie Larivière, Union Nationale (1944–1952)
- Paul-Oliva Goulet, Liberal (1952–1956)
- Joseph-André Larouche, Union Nationale (1956–1962)
- Gilbert-Roland Théberge, Liberal (1962–1973)
