= Winneway =

- Algonquin settlement
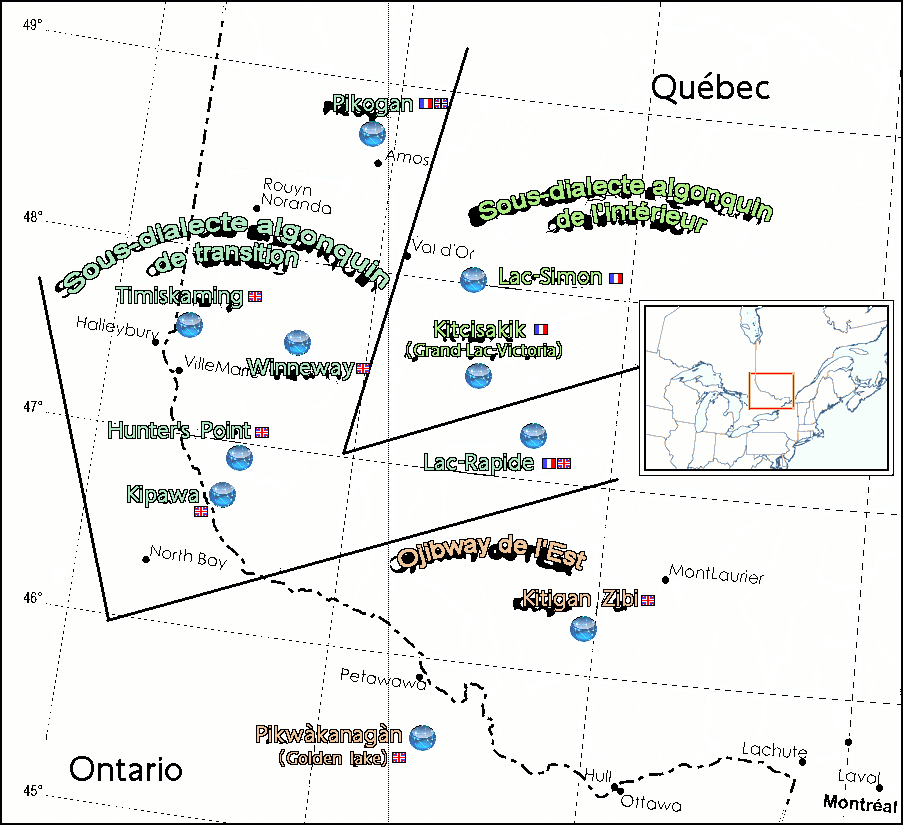

- Location within Quebec Location within Canada
- Coordinates: 47°35′N 78°34′W
- Country: Canada
- Province: Quebec
- Region: Abitibi-Témiscamingue
- RCM: Témiscamingue

Government
  - Chief: Steeve Mathias
  - Federal riding: Abitibi—Témiscamingue
  - Prov. riding: Rouyn-Noranda–Témiscamingue

Area
  - Land: 0.33 km^{2} (0.13 sq mi)

Population (2021)
  - Total: 176
  - Density: 532.4/km^{2} (1,379/sq mi)
  - Change (2016–21): ▲69.2%
  - Dwellings: 59
- Time zone: UTC−05:00 (EST)
  - Summer (DST): UTC−04:00 (EDT)

Winneway is an Indian settlement of Anishinaabe band government in the Abitibi-Témiscamingue region of Quebec. It is geographically located within the territory of Témiscamingue Regional County Municipality and is home to the Long Point First Nation.

According to the 2021 Canadian census the settlement covers an area of 33 ha (0.33 km^{2}; 82 acres) but Indigenous and Northern Affairs Canada shows it having an area of 36.8 ha (0.368 km^{2}; 91 acres). Its population is listed as 176 in the 2021 Canadian census and about 400 on the community website.

== See also ==
- List of anglophone communities in Quebec
