= Moffet, Quebec =

Moffet
- Municipality
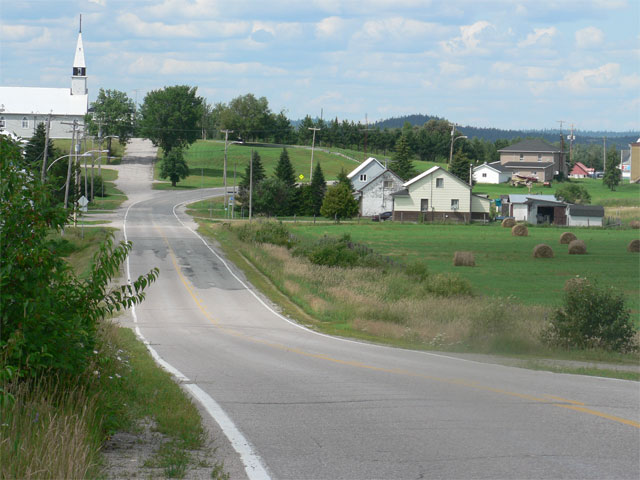
- Entrance of Moffet

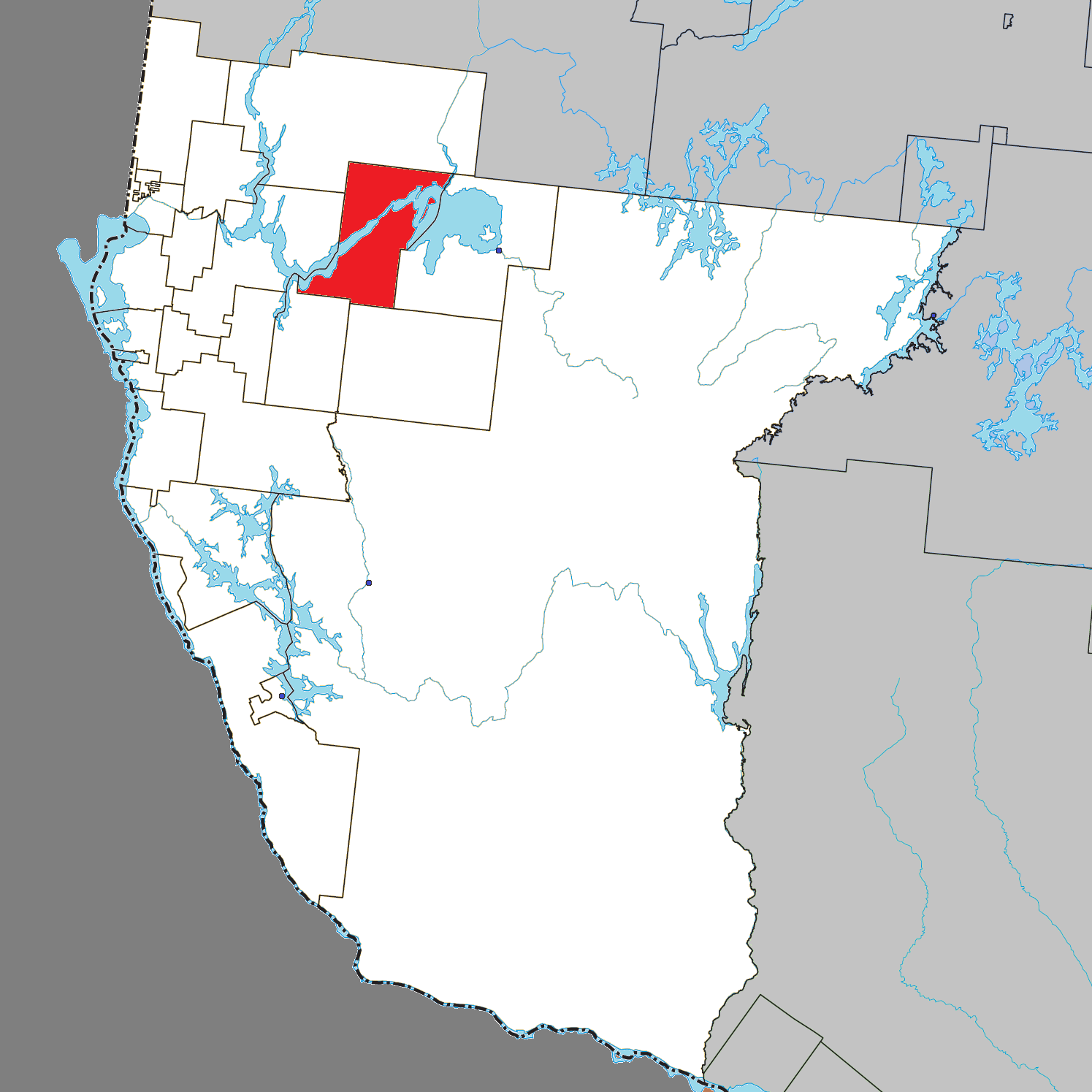
- Location within Témiscamingue RCM

- Location in western Quebec
- Coordinates: 47°33′N 78°57′W
- Country: Canada
- Province: Quebec
- Region: Abitibi-Témiscamingue
- RCM: Témiscamingue
- Settled: 1936
- Constituted: January 1, 1953

Government
  - Mayor: Alexandre Binette
  - Federal riding: Abitibi—Témiscamingue
  - Prov. riding: Rouyn-Noranda–Témiscamingue

Area
  - Total: 427.58 km^{2} (165.09 sq mi)
  - Land: 340.31 km^{2} (131.39 sq mi)

Population (2021)
  - Total: 206
  - Density: 0.6/km^{2} (1.6/sq mi)
  - Pop (2016–21): ▲10.2%
  - Dwellings: 179
- Time zone: UTC−5 (EST)
  - Summer (DST): UTC−4 (EDT)
- Postal code(s): J0Z 2W0
- Area code: 819
- Website: www.moffet.ca

Moffet (French pronunciation: [mɔfɛt]) is a municipality in northwestern Quebec, Canada, in the Témiscamingue Regional County Municipality. The municipality had a population of 206 as of the 2021 Canadian census.

== History ==
As early as 1910, settlers arrived in the area, but it was not until 1931 that the village developed when a group of settlers from Saint-Zacharie in the Beauce region came and cleared the land. The place was named after Joseph Moffet (1852–1932), an Oblate missionary who had explored the Témiscamingue region and founded Ville-Marie. In 1932, the first sawmill was built, followed by the first forge two years later. In 1936, the Moffet Post Office opened, and the next year, the general store.

On January 1, 1953, the Municipality of Moffet was established out of parts of the United Township Municipality of Latulipe-et-Gaboury and previously unincorporated territory. Its first mayor was Emmanuel Gagné.

== Demographics ==
Canada census – Moffet, Quebec community profile

	2021	2016	2011
Population	206 (+10.2% from 2016)	187 (-4.6% from 2011)	196 (-5.8% from 2006)
Land area	340.31 km^{2} (131.39 sq mi)	343.0 km^{2} (132.4 sq mi)	342.83 km^{2} (132.37 sq mi)
Population density	0.6/km^{2} (1.6/sq mi)	0.5/km^{2} (1.3/sq mi)	0.6/km^{2} (1.6/sq mi)
Median age	59.2 (M: 60.0, F: 54.0)	56.9 (M: 58.4, F: 55.3)	48.5 (M: 49.7, F: 46.5)
Private dwellings	179 (total) 104 (occupied)	197 (total) 95 (occupied)	193 (total) 90 (occupied)
Median household income	$.n/a	$.n/a	$.n/a

References: 2021 2016 2011

Historical census populations – Moffet, Quebec

Year	Pop.	±%
1956	710	—
1961	741	+4.4%
1966	697	−5.9%
1971	526	−24.5%
1976	379	−27.9%
1981	321	−15.3%
1986	254	−20.9%

Year	Pop.	±%
1991	246	−3.1%
1996	226	−8.1%
2001	234	+3.5%
2006	208	−11.1%
2011	196	−5.8%
2016	187	−4.6%
2021	206	+10.2%

Population counts are not adjusted for boundary changes.
Source: Statistics Canada

Mother tongue (2021):

- English as first language: 7.1%
- French as first language: 85.7%
- English and French as first language: 2.4%
- Other as first language: 2.4%

== Government ==
List of former mayors:

- Michel Paquette (...–2013)
- Eric Dubuque (2013–2017)
- Alexandre Binette (2017–present)

== See also ==
- List of municipalities in Quebec
