= Kebaowek =

- Indian reserve
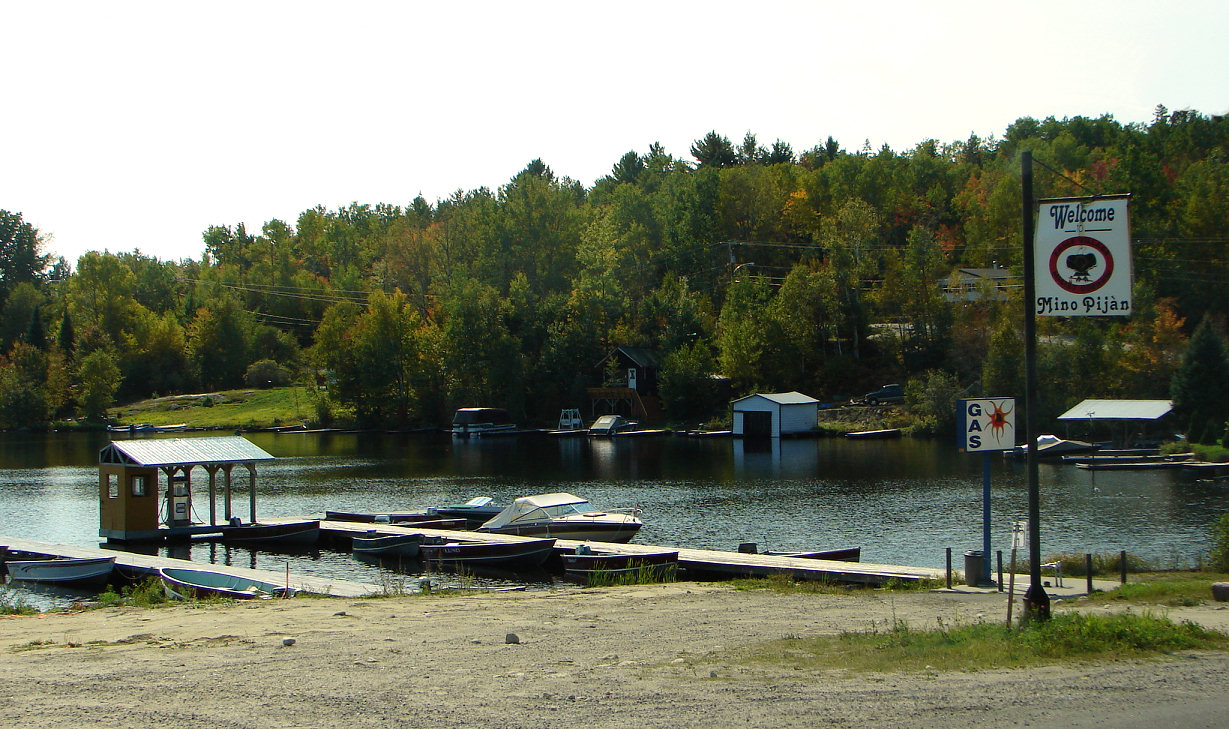
- Welcome sign of Kebaowek

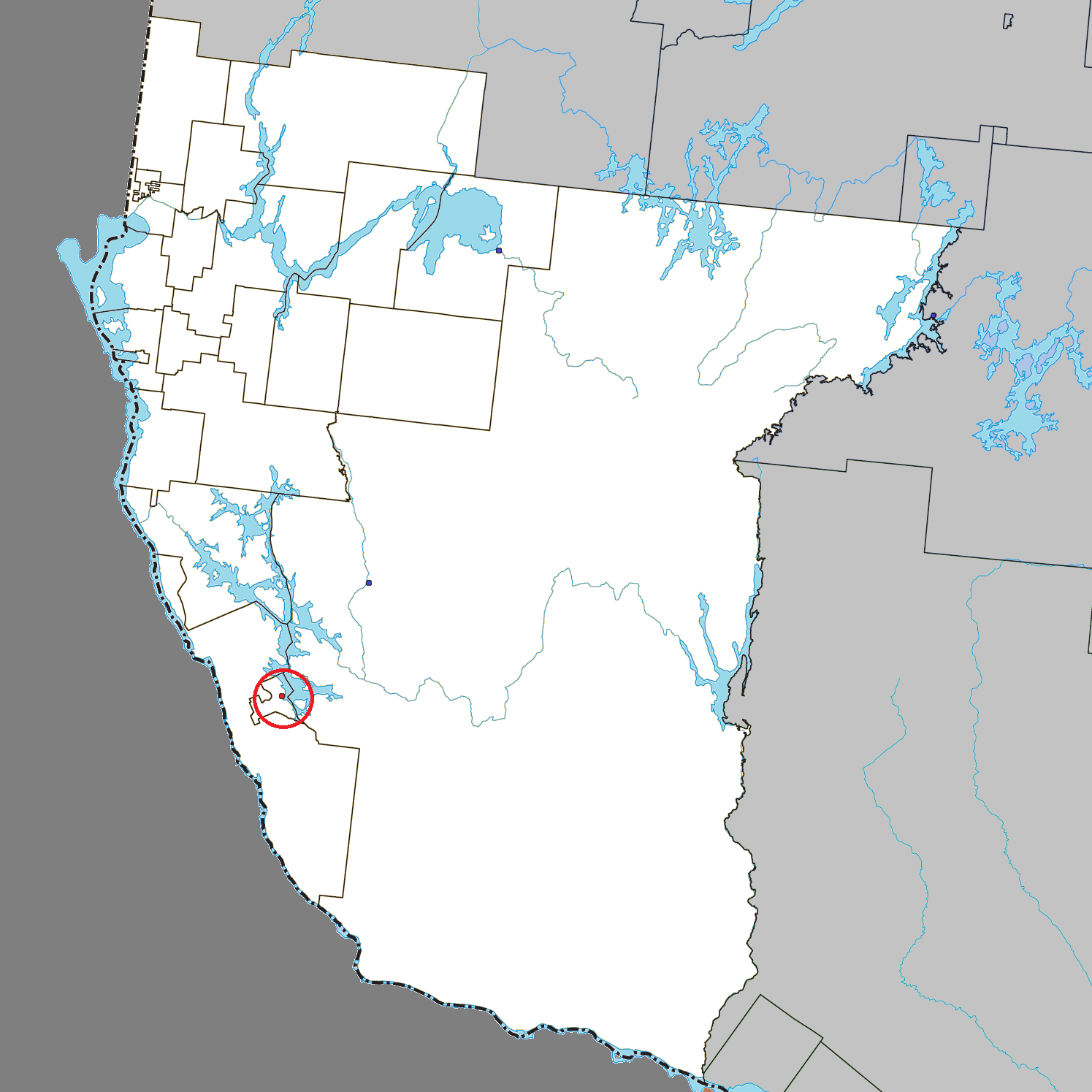
- Location within Témiscamingue RCM.

- Location in Abitibi-Témiscamingue
- Province: Quebec
- Region: Abitibi-Témiscamingue

Government
  - Chief: Lance Haymond

Area
  - Land: 0.57 km^{2} (0.22 sq mi)

Population (2021)
  - Total: 326
- Time zone: UTC−05:00 (EST)
  - Summer (DST): UTC−04:00 (EDT)

Kebaowek or Eagle Village First Nation - Kipawa Indian Reserve, is a First Nations reserve in Abitibi-Témiscamingue, Quebec. It is under the governance of the Kebaowek First Nation.

== See also ==
- List of anglophone communities in Quebec
