= Belleterre =

- City
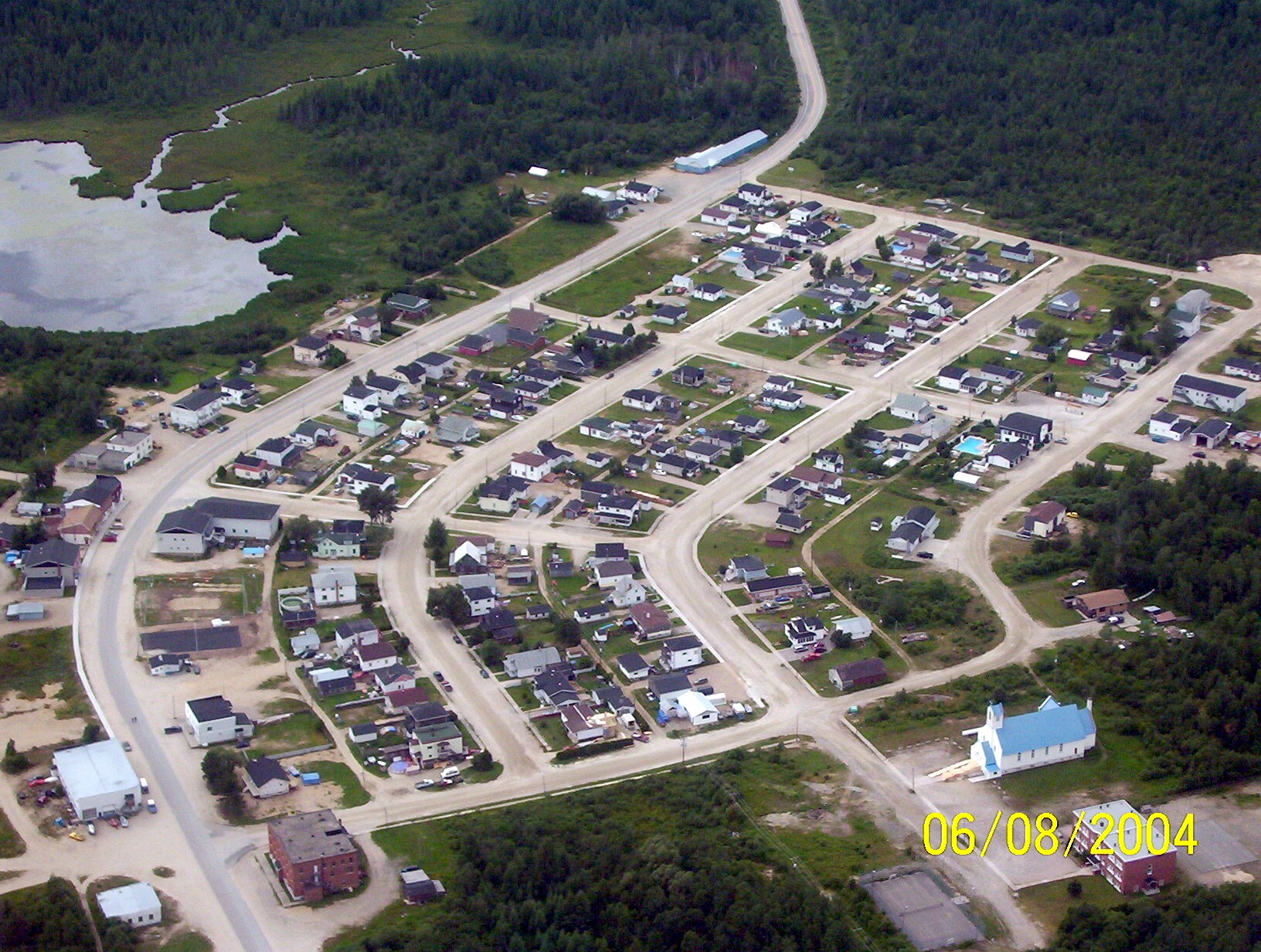

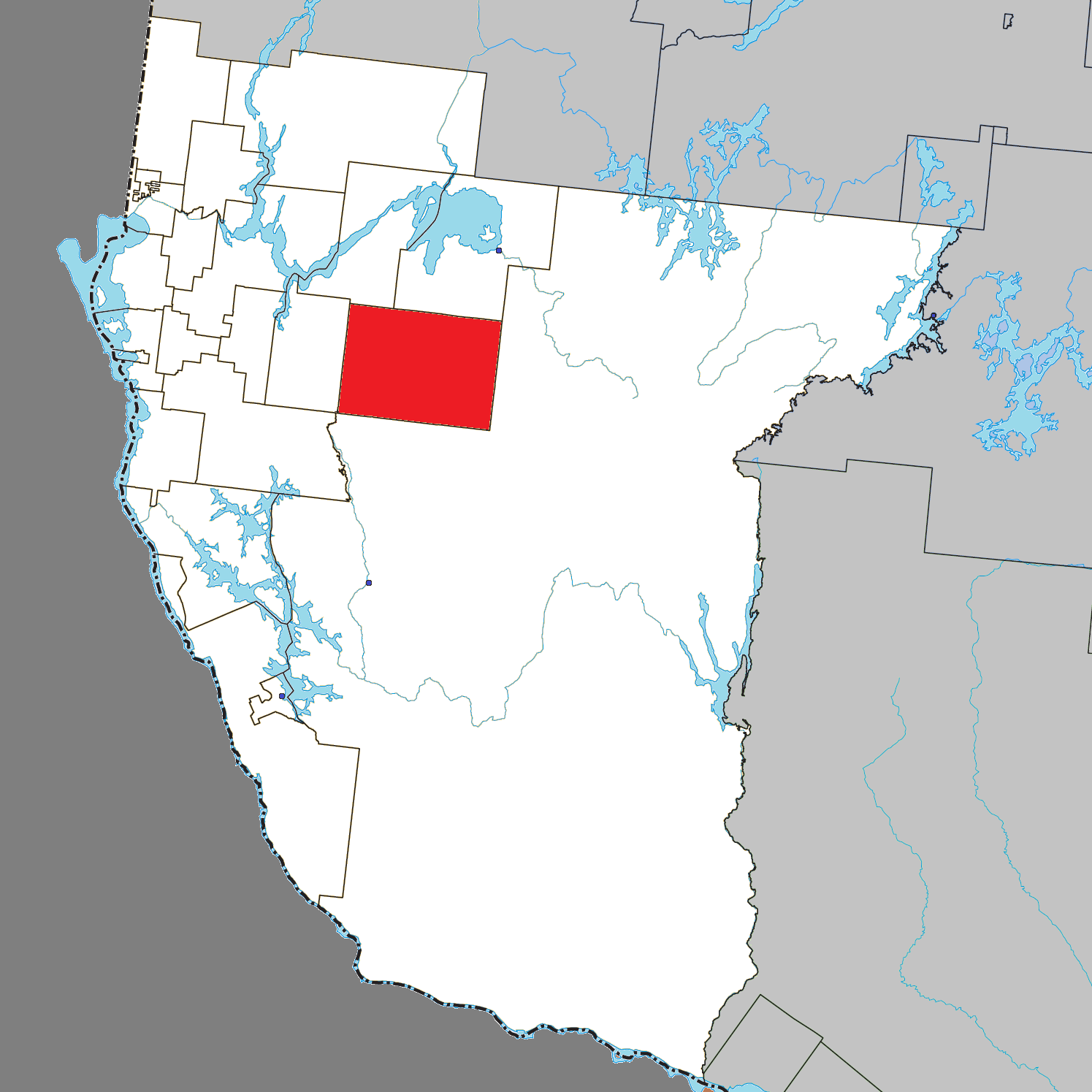
- Location within Témiscamingue RCM

- Location in western Quebec
- Coordinates: 47°23′N 78°42′W
- Country: Canada
- Province: Quebec
- Region: Abitibi-Témiscamingue
- RCM: Témiscamingue
- Constituted: May 13, 1942

Government
  - Mayor: Bruno Boyer
  - Federal riding: Abitibi—Témiscamingue
  - Prov. riding: Rouyn-Noranda–Témiscamingue

Area
  - Total: 607.03 km^{2} (234.38 sq mi)
  - Land: 544.49 km^{2} (210.23 sq mi)

Population (2021)
  - Total: 285
  - Density: 0.5/km^{2} (1.3/sq mi)
  - Pop (2016–21): ▼8.9%
  - Dwellings: 181
- Time zone: UTC−05:00 (EST)
  - Summer (DST): UTC−04:00 (EDT)
- Postal code(s): J0Z 1L0
- Area code: 819
- Highways: R-382
- Website: www.facebook.com/villedebelleterre/?locale=fr_CA

Belleterre (French pronunciation: [bɛltɛʁ]) is a ville in western Quebec, Canada, in the MRC de Témiscamingue.

== History ==
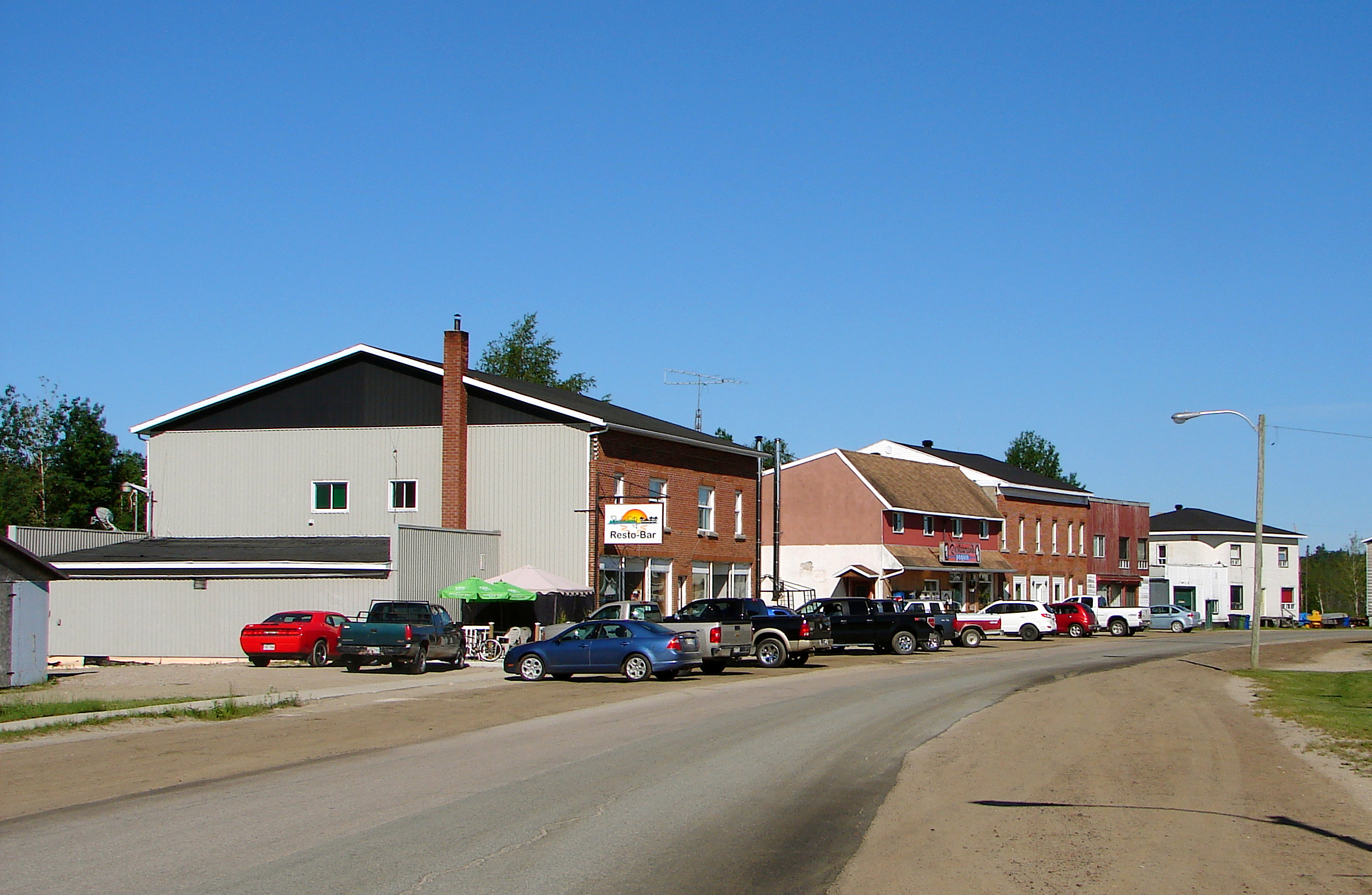
Belleterre main street

In 1930, prospector William Logan discovered gold near Mud Lake (now called Lake Guillet). This led to the establishment of the Belleterre Gold Mines Company in 1935, and the formation of the Belleterre community at nearby Sables Lake to house the miners and their families. In 1942, the place was incorporated as a town and at its peak had some 2000 residents. But by 1957, the mine was depleted and closed.

== Demographics ==
In the 2021 Census of Population conducted by Statistics Canada, Belleterre had a population of 285 living in 136 of its 181 total private dwellings, a change of −8.9% from its 2016 population of 313. With a land area of 544.49 km^{2} (210.23 sq mi), it had a population density of 0.5/km^{2} (1.4/sq mi) in 2021.

Historical census populations – Belleterre

| Year | Pop. | ±% |
|---|---|---|
| 1951 | 1,011 | — |
| 1956 | 889 | −12.1% |
| 1961 | 638 | −28.2% |
| 1966 | 825 | +29.3% |
| 1971 | 614 | −25.6% |

| Year | Pop. | ±% |
|---|---|---|
| 1976 | 535 | −12.9% |
| 1981 | 475 | −11.2% |
| 1986 | 446 | −6.1% |
| 1991 | 418 | −6.3% |
| 1996 | 395 | −5.5% |

| Year | Pop. | ±% |
|---|---|---|
| 2001 | 381 | −3.5% |
| 2006 | 350 | −8.1% |
| 2011 | 298 | −14.9% |
| 2016 | 313 | +5.0% |
| 2021 | 285 | −8.9% |

Source: Statistics Canada

Mother tongue (2021):

- English as first language: 7.0%
- French as first language: 89.5%
- English and French as first language: 1.8%
- Other as first language: 1.8%

== See also ==
- List of cities in Quebec
