= Saint-Eugène-de-Guigues =

- Municipality
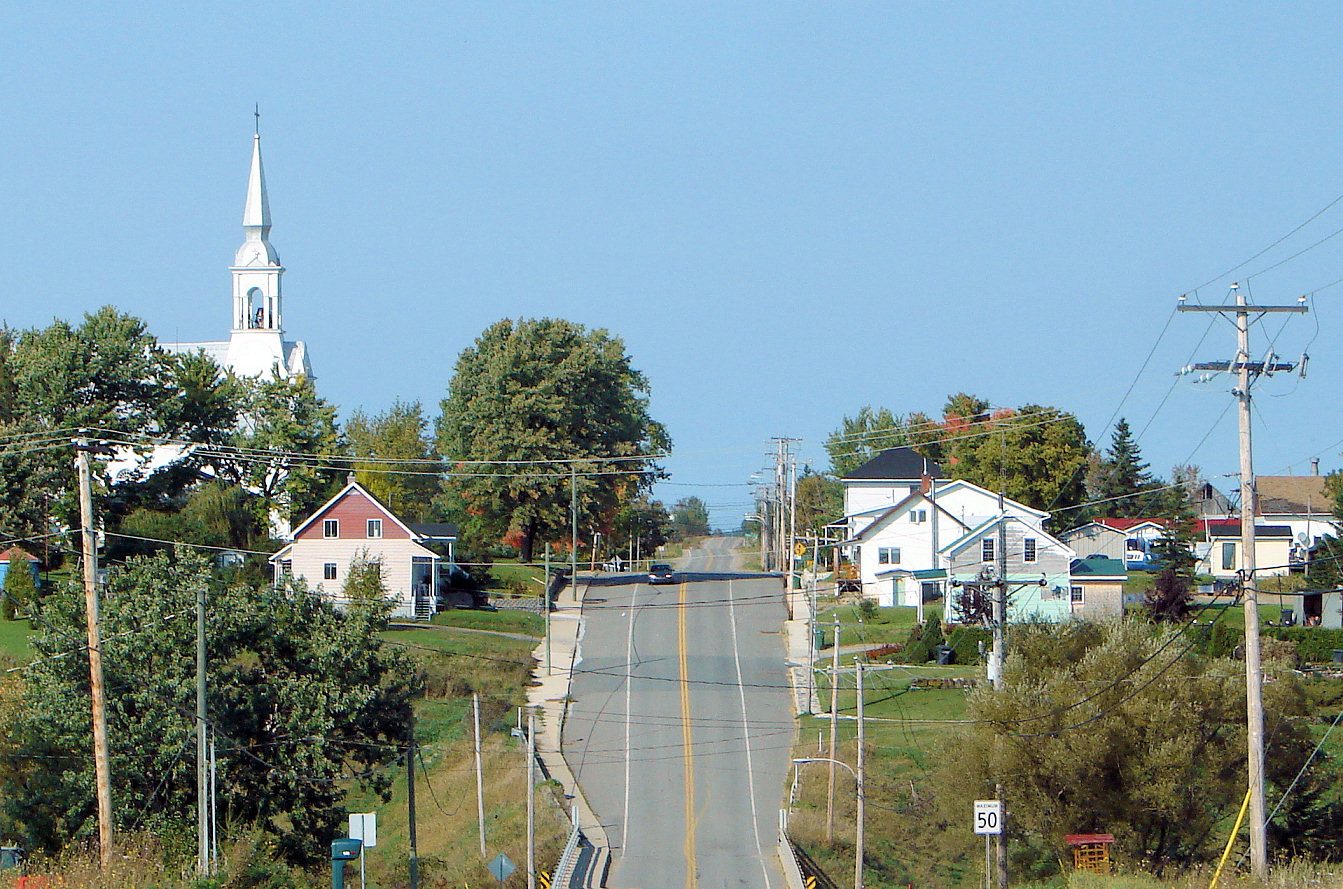
- Downtown of Saint-Eugène-de-Guigues
- Motto: S'Unir pour Grandir
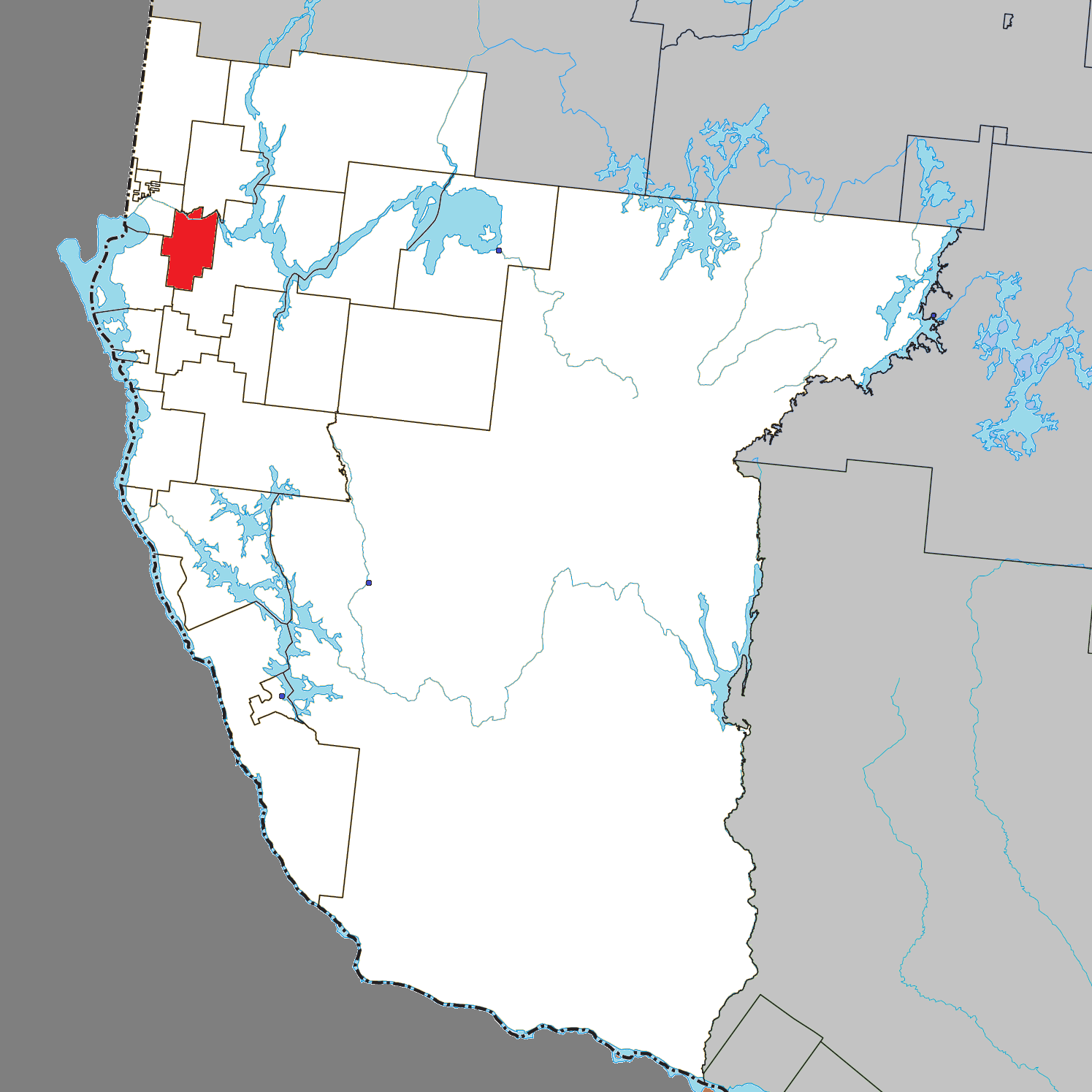
- Location within Témiscamingue RCM

- Location in western Quebec
- Coordinates: 47°31′N 79°21′W
- Country: Canada
- Province: Quebec
- Region: Abitibi-Témiscamingue
- RCM: Témiscamingue
- Settled: 1911
- Constituted: November 20, 1912

Government
  - Mayor: Marco Dénommé
  - Federal riding: Abitibi—Témiscamingue
  - Prov. riding: Rouyn-Noranda–Témiscamingue

Area
  - Total: 116.61 km^{2} (45.02 sq mi)
  - Land: 109.52 km^{2} (42.29 sq mi)

Population (2021)
  - Total: 458
  - Density: 4.2/km^{2} (11/sq mi)
  - Pop (2016–21): ▼1.5%
  - Dwellings: 254
- Time zone: UTC−05:00 (EST)
  - Summer (DST): UTC−04:00 (EDT)
- Postal code(s): J0Z 3L0
- Area code: 819
- Highways: R-391
- Website: www.st-eugene-de-guigues.qc.ca

Saint-Eugène-de-Guigues (French pronunciation: [sɛ̃t‿øʒɛn də ɡiɡ]) is a municipality in northwestern Quebec, Canada, in the Témiscamingue Regional County Municipality.

== History ==
In 1881, the geographic township of Guigues was proclaimed, named in honour of Joseph-Eugène-Bruno Guigues. In 1897, it was incorporated as the Township Municipality of Guigues.

In 1911, the parish of Saint-Eugène-de-Guigues was founded, and the following year, the Municipality of Saint-Eugène-de-Guigues was created when it split off from the township.

== Demographics ==
Canada census – Saint-Eugène-de-Guigues community profile

	2021	2016	2011
Population	458 (-1.5% from 2016)	465 (+2.4% from 2011)	454 (-4.2% from 2006)
Land area	109.52 km^{2} (42.29 sq mi)	110.02 km^{2} (42.48 sq mi)	110.34 km^{2} (42.60 sq mi)
Population density	4.2/km^{2} (11/sq mi)	4.2/km^{2} (11/sq mi)	4.1/km^{2} (11/sq mi)
Median age	42.8 (M: 43.2, F: 42.0)	38.7 (M: 38.9, F: 38.5)	43.2 (M: 43.4, F: 41.9)
Private dwellings	254 (total) 198 (occupied)	286 (total) 190 (occupied)	185 (total) 182 (occupied)
Median household income	$71,000	$56,960	$54,099

References: 2021 2016 2011

Historical census populations – Saint-Eugène-de-Guigues

Year	Pop.	±%
1921	564	—
1931	939	+66.5%
1941	952	+1.4%
1951	750	−21.2%
1956	873	+16.4%
1961	878	+0.6%

Year	Pop.	±%
1966	890	+1.4%
1971	662	−25.6%
1976	518	−21.8%
1981	506	−2.3%
1986	473	−6.5%
1991	415	−12.3%

Year	Pop.	±%
1996	423	+1.9%
2001	439	+3.8%
2006	474	+8.0%
2011	454	−4.2%
2016	465	+2.4%
2021	458	−1.5%

Population counts are not adjusted for boundary changes.
Source: Statistics Canada

Mother tongue (2021):

- English as first language: 2.2%
- French as first language: 97.8%
- English and French as first language: 1.1%
- Other as first language: 1.1%

== Government ==
List of former mayors:

- Normand Roy (...–2005)
- Jacinthe Marcoux (2009–2013)
- Édith Lafond (2013–2017)
- Marco Denommé (2017–present)

== See also ==
- List of municipalities in Quebec
