= Témiscamingue Regional County Municipality =

Témiscamingue
- Regional county municipality
- Coordinates: 47°33′N 79°14′W
- Country: Canada
- Province: Quebec
- Region: Abitibi-Témiscamingue
- Effective: April 15, 1981
- County seat: Ville-Marie

Government
  - Type: Prefecture
  - Prefect: Martin Lefebvre

Area
  - Total: 19,233.77 km^{2} (7,426.20 sq mi)
  - Land: 16,327.26 km^{2} (6,303.99 sq mi)

Population (2021)
  - Total: 16,132
  - Density: 1/km^{2} (2.6/sq mi)
  - Change (2016-21): ▲1.0%
  - Dwellings: 8,821
- Time zone: UTC−05:00 (EST)
  - Summer (DST): UTC−04:00 (EDT)
- Area code: 819
- Website: www.mrc temiscamingue.qc.ca

Témiscamingue (French pronunciation: [temiskamɛ̃ɡ]) is a regional county municipality in the Abitibi-Témiscamingue region of western Quebec, Canada. The county seat is Ville-Marie.

Though Témiscamingue borders Pontiac Regional County Municipality to the south, it is not practical to travel between the two within Quebec without taking a major detour north towards Quebec Route 117. The shorter route is to cross into Ontario at Notre-Dame-du-Nord or Témiscaming and travel south on Highway 11, then east on Highway 17, before crossing back at L'Isle-aux-Allumettes.

== Subdivisions ==
There are 21 subdivisions within the RCM:

Cities and towns (3)

- Belleterre
- Témiscaming
- Ville-Marie

Municipalities (12)

- Béarn
- Duhamel-Ouest
- Fugèreville
- Kipawa
- Laforce
- Laverlochère-Angliers
- Lorrainville
- Moffet
- Notre-Dame-du-Nord
- Rémigny
- Saint-Bruno-de-Guigues
- Saint-Eugène-de-Guigues

Parishes (1)

- Saint-Édouard-de-Fabre

Townships (2)

- Guérin
- Nédélec

United townships (1)

- Latulipe-et-Gaboury

Unorganized territory (2)

- Laniel
- Les Lacs-du-Témiscamingue

Indian reserve or settlement (4)
(not associated with RCM)

- Hunter's Point
- Kebaowek
- Timiskaming First Nation
- Winneway

== Demographics ==
=== Population ===
Canada census – Témiscamingue Regional County Municipality community profile

	2021	2016	2011
Population	16,132 (+1.0% from 2016)	15,980 (-2.7% from 2011)	16,425 (-3.3% from 2006)
Land area	16,327.26 km^{2} (6,303.99 sq mi)	16,420.32 km^{2} (6,339.92 sq mi)	16,419.63 km^{2} (6,339.65 sq mi)
Population density	1.0/km^{2} (2.6/sq mi)	1.0/km^{2} (2.6/sq mi)	1.0/km^{2} (2.6/sq mi)
Median age	48.0 (M: 48.0, F: 48.0)	46.9 (M: 46.3, F: 47.5)	44.4 (M: 43.8, F: 44.9)
Private dwellings	8,821 (total) 7,317 (occupied)	8,992 (total)	8,494 (total)
Median household income	$65,500	$55,627	$48,835

References: 2021 2016 2011

Historical Census Data - Témiscamingue Regional County Municipality, Quebec

Year	Pop.	±%
1991	17,381	—
1996	18,027	+3.7%
2001	17,504	−2.9%
2006	16,985	−3.0%

Year	Pop.	±%
2011	16,425	−3.3%
2016	15,980	−2.7%
2021	16,132	+1.0%

Source: Statistics Canada

=== Language ===
Canada Census Mother Tongue - Témiscamingue Regional County Municipality, Quebec
Census	Total	French			English			French & English			Other		
Year	Responses	Count	Trend	Pop %	Count	Trend	Pop %	Count	Trend	Pop %	Count	Trend	Pop %
2016	15,785	13,265	▼3.9%	84.04%	2,185	▲0.9%	13.84%	140	▲3.7%	0.89%	195	▲14.7%	1.24%
2011	16,270	13,800	▼2.3%	84.82%	2,165	▼0.2%	13.31%	135	▲68.8%	0.83%	170	▼58.0%	1.04%
2006	16,775	14,120	▼4.6%	84.17%	2,170	▲2.1%	12.94%	80	▼38.5%	0.48%	405	▲72.3%	2.41%
2001	17,285	14,795	▼1.6%	85.59%	2,125	▼14.1%	12.29%	130	▼27.8%	0.75%	235	▲67.9%	1.36%
1996	17,825	15,030	n/a	84.32%	2,475	n/a	13.88%	180	n/a	1.01%	140	n/a	0.79%

== Transportation ==
=== Access routes ===
Highways and numbered routes that run through the municipality, including external routes that start or finish at the county border:

- Autoroutes
  - None
- Principal Highways
  - R-101
- Secondary Highways
  - R-382
  - R-391
- External Routes
  - Highway 63
  - Highway 65

== See also ==
- List of regional county municipalities and equivalent territories in Quebec
