= Laforce =

- Municipality
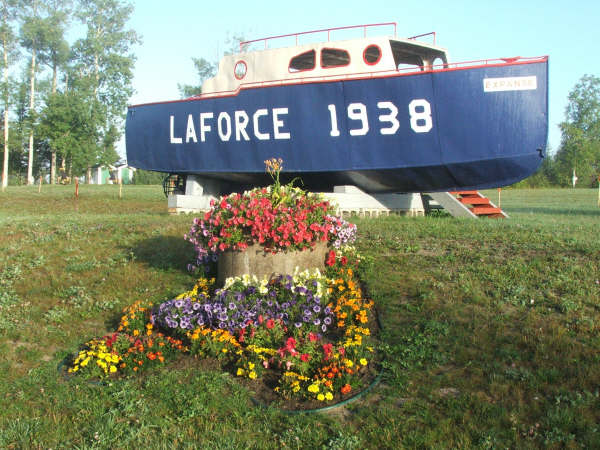
- The Expanse, a timber tugboat, worked for C.I.P. (Canadian International Paper). It entered service on Lake Simard in 1950.

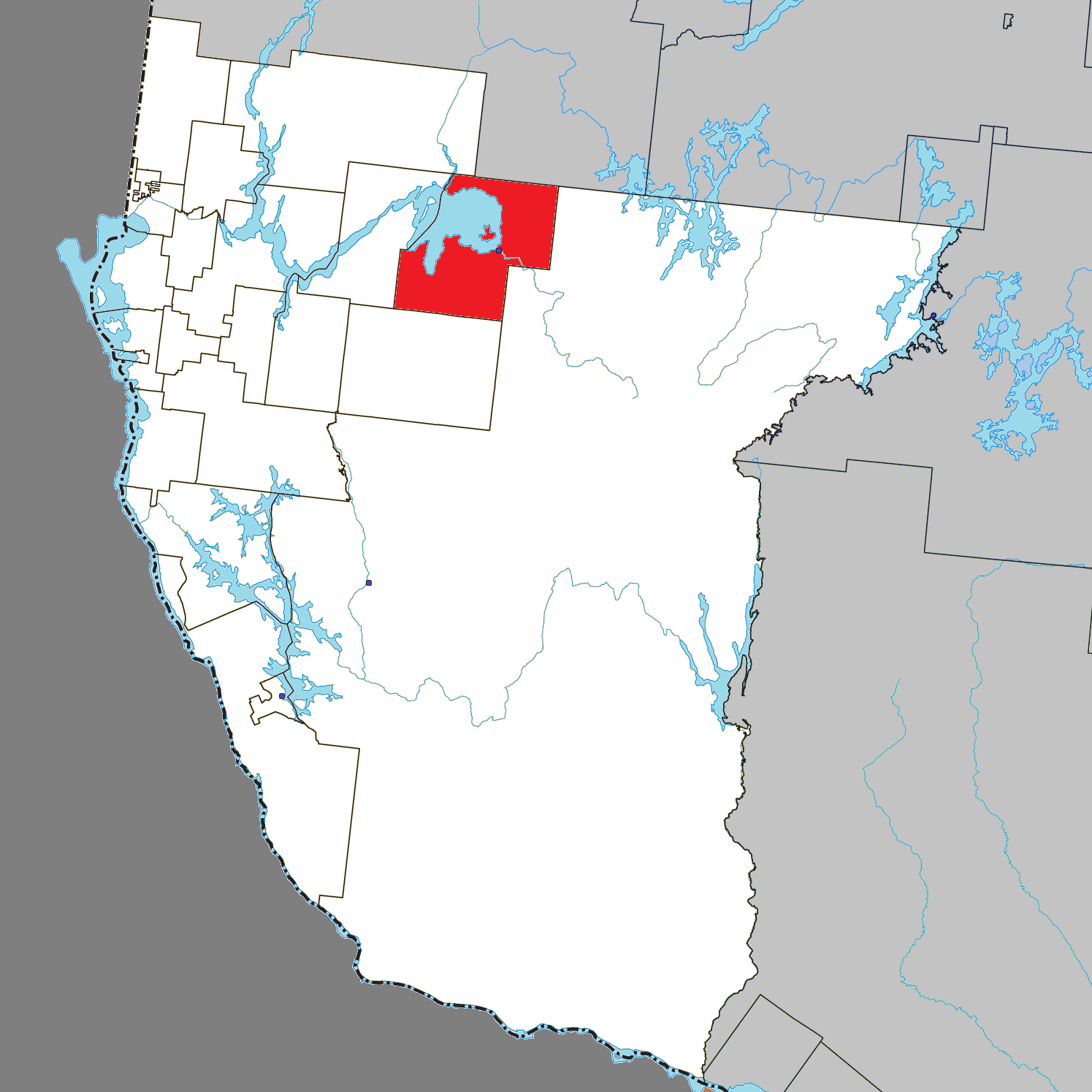
- Location within Témiscamingue RCM

- Location in western Quebec
- Coordinates: 47°32′N 78°44′W
- Country: Canada
- Province: Quebec
- Region: Abitibi-Témiscamingue
- RCM: Témiscamingue
- Settled: 1937
- Constituted: January 1, 1979

Government
  - Mayor: Gérald Charron
  - Federal riding: Abitibi—Témiscamingue
  - Prov. riding: Rouyn-Noranda–Témiscamingue

Area
  - Total: 590.46 km^{2} (227.98 sq mi)
  - Land: 436.78 km^{2} (168.64 sq mi)

Population (2021)
  - Total: 266
  - Density: 0.6/km^{2} (1.6/sq mi)
  - Pop (2016–21): ▲15.2%
  - Dwellings: 110
- Time zone: UTC−05:00 (EST)
  - Summer (DST): UTC−04:00 (EDT)
- Postal code(s): J0Z 2J0
- Area code: 819
- Website: laforce.ca

Laforce (French pronunciation: [lafɔʁs]) is a municipality in northwestern Quebec, Canada, in the Témiscamingue Regional County Municipality.

== History ==
The place saw its first settlers in 1937, and was originally called Devlin, after the geographic township of Devlin, in turn named in honour of Charles Ramsay Devlin. In 1938, the Parish of Saint-Charles-Borromée-de-Devlin was founded. In June of that same year, the place received the name Laforce, named after Ernest Laforce (1879–1977), deputy minister of Colonization of Quebec at that time. In 1940, the Laforce Post Office opened.

On January 1, 1979, the Municipality of Laforce was created out of previously unincorporated area.

== Demographics ==
Canada census – Laforce community profile

	2021	2016	2011
Population	320 (+38.5% from 2016)	231 (-5.7% from 2011)	147 (-15.5% from 2006)
Land area	436.78 km^{2} (168.64 sq mi)	439.48 km^{2} (169.68 sq mi)	440.45 km^{2} (170.06 sq mi)
Population density	0.7/km^{2} (1.8/sq mi)	0.5/km^{2} (1.3/sq mi)	0.3/km^{2} (0.78/sq mi)
Median age	31.4 (M: 32.8, F: 31.2)	38.8 (M: 38.5, F: 39.5)	43.8 (M: 44.3, F: 40.9)
Private dwellings	124 (total) 109 (occupied)	107 (total) 92 (occupied)	79 (total) 61 (occupied)
Median household income	$62,000	$n/a	$n/a

References: 2021 2016 2011

Historical census populations – Laforce

Year	Pop.	±%
1981	290	—
1986	264	−9.0%
1991	225	−14.8%
1996	295	+31.1%
2001	303	+2.7%

Year	Pop.	±%
2006	174	−42.6%
2011	147	−15.5%
2016	231	+57.1%
2021	266	+15.2%

Population figures based on revised counts. Population counts are not adjusted for boundary changes.
Source: Statistics Canada

Mother tongue (2021):

- English as first language: 59.4%
- French as first language: 32.8%
- English and French as first language: 1.6%
- Other as first language: 6.3%

== Government ==
List of former mayors:

- Patrice Rioux (1979–1979)
- Yves Nolet (1979–1981, 1987–1989)
- Bertrand Pichette (1981–1987)
- Alain Sinotte (1989–2000)
- Gérald Charron (2000–2013, 2017–present)
- Isabelle Morin (2013–2017)

== See also ==
- List of anglophone communities in Quebec
- List of municipalities in Quebec
