= Latulipe-et-Gaboury =

- United township municipality
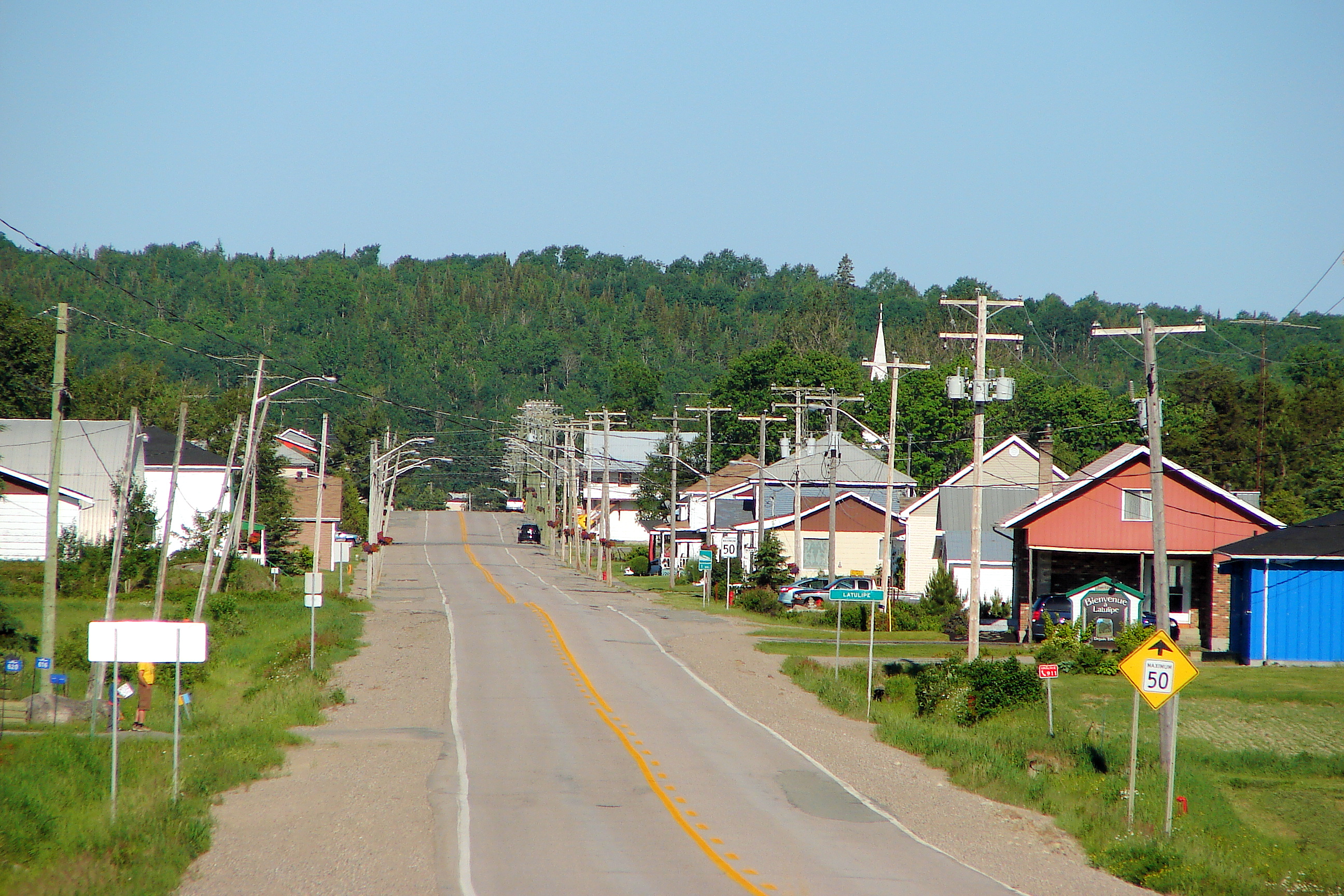
- Latulipe

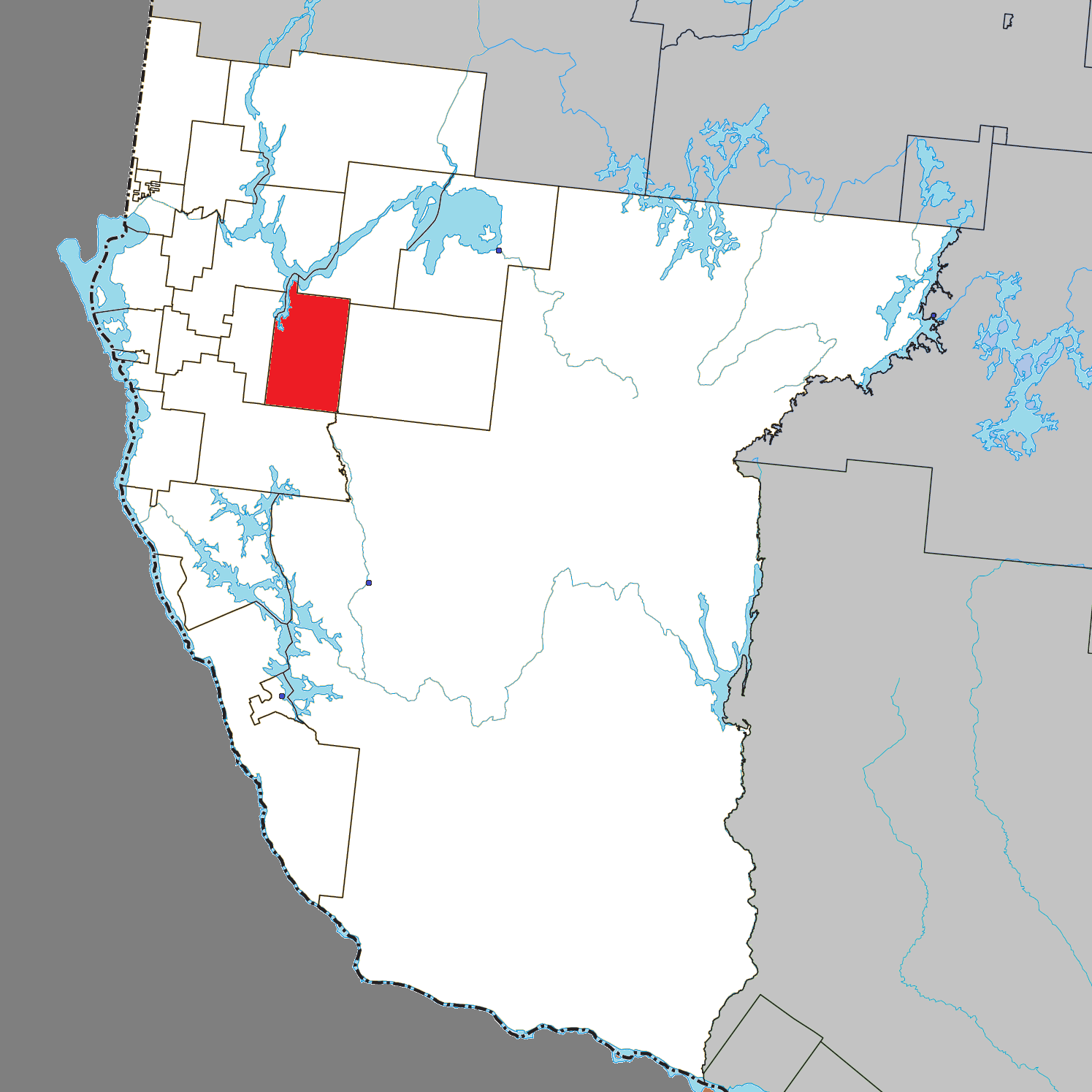
- Location within Témiscamingue RCM

- Location in western Quebec
- Coordinates: 47°25′38″N 79°01′56″W
- Country: Canada
- Province: Quebec
- Region: Abitibi-Témiscamingue
- RCM: Témiscamingue
- Settled: 1909
- Constituted: November 18, 1924
- Named for: Élie-Anicet Latulipe, Tancrède-Charles Gaboury

Government
  - Mayor: Vincent Gingras
  - Federal riding: Abitibi—Témiscamingue
  - Prov. riding: Rouyn-Noranda–Témiscamingue

Area
  - Total: 300.00 km^{2} (115.83 sq mi)
  - Land: 270.11 km^{2} (104.29 sq mi)

Population (2021)
  - Total: 320
  - Density: 1.2/km^{2} (3.1/sq mi)
  - Pop (2016–21): ▲8.5%
  - Dwellings: 225
- Time zone: UTC−05:00 (EST)
  - Summer (DST): UTC−04:00 (EDT)
- Postal code(s): J0Z 2N0
- Area code: 819
- Highways: R-382
- Website: www.latulipeetgaboury.net

Latulipe-et-Gaboury (French pronunciation: [latylip e ɡabuʁi]) is a united township municipality in northwestern Quebec, Canada, in the Témiscamingue Regional County Municipality. The only other remaining united township municipality in Quebec is Stoneham-et-Tewkesbury.

The only population centre in the united township is the village of Latulipe.

== History ==
In 1909, the geographic township of Latulipe was proclaimed, named after Élie-Anicet Latulipe (1859-1922), first bishop of Haileybury. That same year, the first settlers arrived. And in 1919, the geographic township of Gaboury was proclaimed, named after Tancrède-Charles Gaboury (1851-1937). In November 1924, the United Township Municipality of Latulipe-et-Gaboury was established.

== Geography ==
=== Climate ===
Climate data for Latulipe-et-Gaboury
Month	Jan	Feb	Mar	Apr	May	Jun	Jul	Aug	Sep	Oct	Nov	Dec	Year
Record high °C (°F)	13.3 (55.9)	13.5 (56.3)	21.1 (70.0)	31.7 (89.1)	34.4 (93.9)	38.9 (102.0)	39.4 (102.9)	38.9 (102.0)	32.8 (91.0)	30 (86)	21.1 (70.0)	17.2 (63.0)	39.4 (102.9)
Mean daily maximum °C (°F)	−9.5 (14.9)	−6.9 (19.6)	−0.5 (31.1)	7.9 (46.2)	16.2 (61.2)	21.4 (70.5)	24.2 (75.6)	22.5 (72.5)	16.7 (62.1)	9.9 (49.8)	1.4 (34.5)	−5.9 (21.4)	8.1 (46.6)
Daily mean °C (°F)	−15 (5)	−12.7 (9.1)	−6.2 (20.8)	2.5 (36.5)	10.4 (50.7)	15.7 (60.3)	18.8 (65.8)	17.4 (63.3)	12.2 (54.0)	6 (43)	−1.9 (28.6)	−10.4 (13.3)	3.1 (37.6)
Mean daily minimum °C (°F)	−20.5 (−4.9)	−18.5 (−1.3)	−11.9 (10.6)	−2.9 (26.8)	4.4 (39.9)	10 (50)	13.3 (55.9)	12.3 (54.1)	7.6 (45.7)	2.1 (35.8)	−5.3 (22.5)	−14.9 (5.2)	−2 (28)
Record low °C (°F)	−43 (−45)	−43 (−45)	−37.8 (−36.0)	−24 (−11)	−10 (14)	−2.2 (28.0)	2 (36)	−1.7 (28.9)	−6.1 (21.0)	−13.3 (8.1)	−27.8 (−18.0)	−42.8 (−45.0)	−43 (−45)
Average precipitation mm (inches)	61 (2.4)	45.7 (1.80)	57.1 (2.25)	74.6 (2.94)	89.4 (3.52)	88.6 (3.49)	94.9 (3.74)	106.6 (4.20)	93.6 (3.69)	99.9 (3.93)	83.5 (3.29)	72 (2.8)	966.9 (38.07)
Source: Environment Canada

== Demographics ==
In the 2021 Census of Population conducted by Statistics Canada, Latulipe-et-Gaboury had a population of 320 living in 159 of its 225 total private dwellings, a change of 8.5% from its 2016 population of 295. With a land area of 270.11 km^{2} (104.29 sq mi), it had a population density of 1.2/km^{2} (3.1/sq mi) in 2021.

Historical census populations – Latulipe-et-Gaboury

Year	Pop.	±%
1931	423	—
1941	1,017	+140.4%
1951	1,215	+19.5%
1956	832	−31.5%
1961	844	+1.4%
1966	776	−8.1%

Year	Pop.	±%
1971	606	−21.9%
1976	532	−12.2%
1981	470	−11.7%
1986	448	−4.7%
1991	366	−18.3%
1996	351	−4.1%

Year	Pop.	±%
2001	357	+1.7%
2006	333	−6.7%
2011	304	−8.7%
2016	295	−3.0%
2021	320	+8.5%

Population counts are not adjusted for boundary changes.
Source: Statistics Canada

Mother tongue (2021):

- English as first language: 1.6%
- French as first language: 98.4%
- English and French as first language: 0%
- Other as first language: 0%

== Sister cities ==
- Brocas les Forges (France)

== See also ==
- List of township municipalities in Quebec
