= List of historic places in Abitibi-Témiscamingue =

This article is a list of historic places in Abitibi-Témiscamingue, entered on the Canadian Register of Historic Places, whether they are federal, provincial, or municipal. All addresses are the administrative Region 08. For all other listings in the province of Quebec, see List of historic places in Quebec.

Name	Address	Coordinates	Government recognition (CRHP №)	Wikidata ID	Image
Château d'eau de l'ancienne mine Sullivan	456, Rue de l'Hotel-de-Ville; Val-d'Or QC	48°07′40″N 77°50′15″W	Quebec (7710)		
Pont Champagne	Chemin du Pont-Champagne; Val-d'Or QC	48°12′53″N 77°55′32″W	Quebec (10179)		
La Corne Nursing Station National Historic Site of Canada	339 Route 111; La Corne QC	48°21′20″N 77°59′45″W	Federal (12958), Quebec (9400)		More images
Remorqueur T.-E.-Draper	11, Rue du T.-E.-Draper; Laverlochère-Angliers QC	47°33′07″N 79°14′06″W	Quebec (6670)		
École du Rang-II-d'Authier	Route 111; Authier QC	48°44′57″N 78°52′30″W	Quebec (6927)		More images
Gare de Témiscaming	15, Rue Humphrey; Temiscaming QC	46°43′17″N 79°05′37″W	Quebec (6987)		More images
Domaine Breen	24, Rue Principale Nord; Saint-Bruno-de-Guigues QC	47°27′53″N 79°26′18″W	Quebec (8989)		Upload Photo
Poste de relais pour le flottage du bois d'Opémican	Route 101; Temiscaming QC	46°49′56″N 79°11′29″W	Quebec (9121)		Upload Photo
Site historique de Rapide-Danseur	Rue du Village; Rapide-Danseur QC	48°33′08″N 79°19′00″W	Quebec (11151)		
Église de Notre-Dame-du-Mont-Carmel	Fugèreville QC	47°23′50″N 79°11′59″W	Quebec (11984)		Upload Photo
Ancien presbytère de Latulipe-et-Gaboury	5, Rue Principale Est; Latulipe-et-Gaboury QC	47°25′39″N 79°01′54″W	Quebec (12023)		Upload Photo
Pont Landry	Montee du 9e-Rang; Latulipe-et-Gaboury QC	47°23′51″N 79°02′50″W	Quebec (12431)		More images
Site historique du Village-Minier-de-Bourlamaque	Avenue Perreault; Val-d'Or QC	48°05′43″N 77°46′16″W	Quebec (9110)		More images
Ancien palais de justice	101, 3ieme Avenue Est; Amos QC	48°34′27″N 78°06′47″W	Quebec (6412)		More images
Site de la maison Hector-Authier	122, Rue Authier; Amos QC	48°34′15″N 78°07′14″W	Quebec (7077)		More images
Maison Hector-Authier	122, Rue Authier; Amos QC	48°34′15″N 78°07′14″W	Quebec (7082)		More images
Cathédrale d'Amos	Boulevard Monseigneur-Dudemaine; Amos QC	48°34′23″N 78°07′02″W	Quebec (13080)		
Évêché d'Amos	450, Rue Principale Nord; Amos QC	48°34′49″N 78°06′57″W	Quebec (14417)		More images
Maison du Frère-Moffet	7, Rue Notre-Dame-de-Lourdes; Ville-Marie QC	47°19′54″N 79°26′34″W	Quebec (10399)		
Domaine Moses-Brown	Duhamel-Ouest QC	47°22′43″N 79°32′40″W	Quebec (10590)		Upload Photo
Site historique de la Maison-Dumulon	191, Avenue du Lac; Rouyn-Noranda QC	48°14′21″N 79°00′56″W	Quebec (6684)		More images
Église Saint-Georges	201, Rue Tachereau Ouest; Rouyn-Noranda QC	48°14′21″N 79°00′56″W	Quebec (7135)		More images
Canadian National Railway Station	Station Avenue; Macamic QC	48°45′19″N 79°00′08″W	Federal (6813), Macamic municipality (9140)		
Apitipik National Historic Site of Canada	Eastern end of Lake Abitibi; Pikogan QC	48°38′11″N 79°19′12″W	Federal (1156)		
Federal Building	97 Rue Perreault Est; Rouyn QC	48°14′18″N 79°01′01″W	Federal (4264)		
Canadian National Railways Station	4th St. West; Senneterre QC	48°23′32″N 77°14′41″W	Federal (4585)		
