= Angliers =

Angliers is the name of the following places:

- Angliers, Charente-Maritime, a commune in the Charente-Maritime department of France
- Angliers, Vienne, a commune in the Vienne department of France
- Angliers, Quebec, a village in Quebec, Canada
