= Laverlochère =

- Former municipality
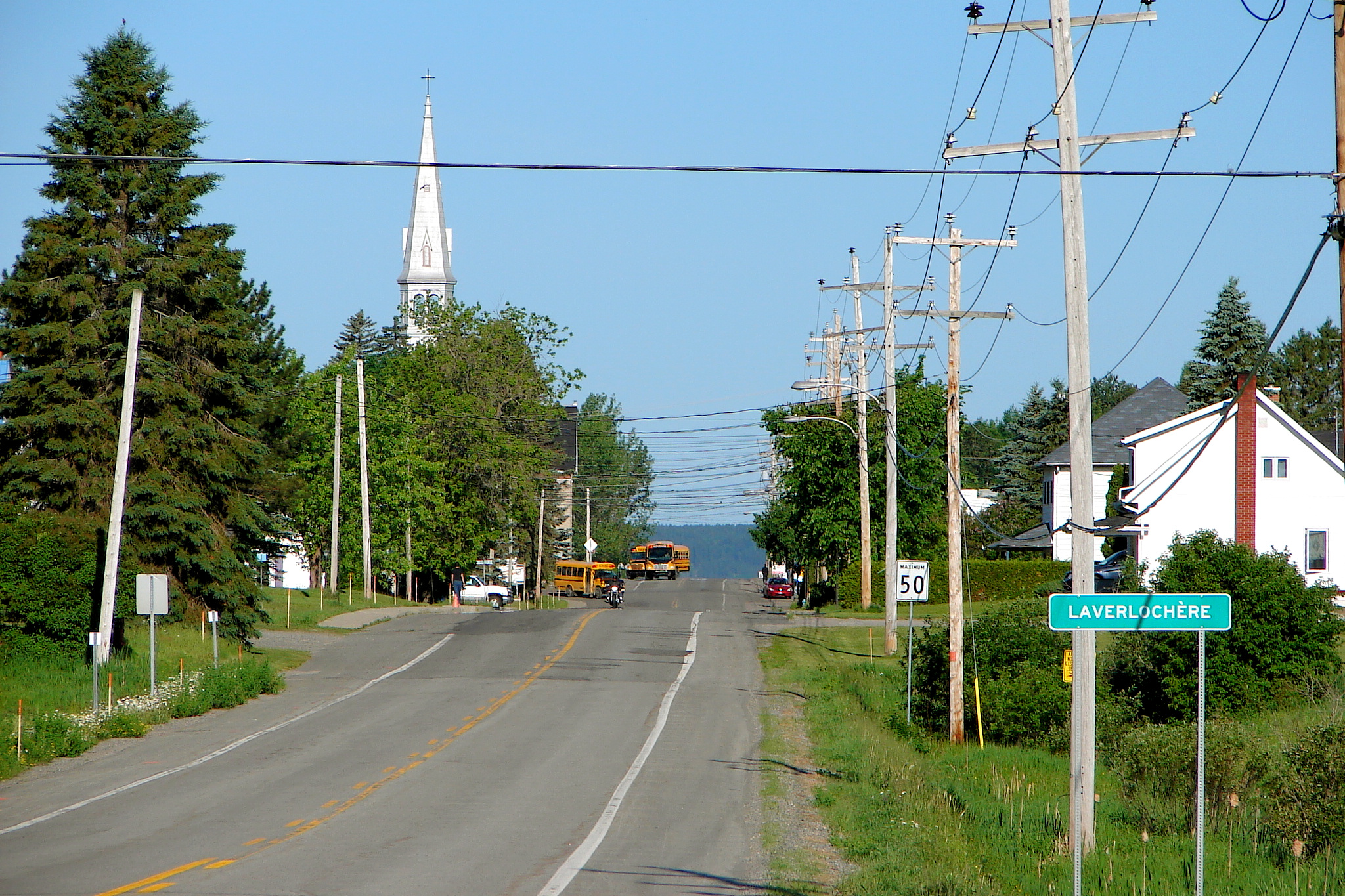

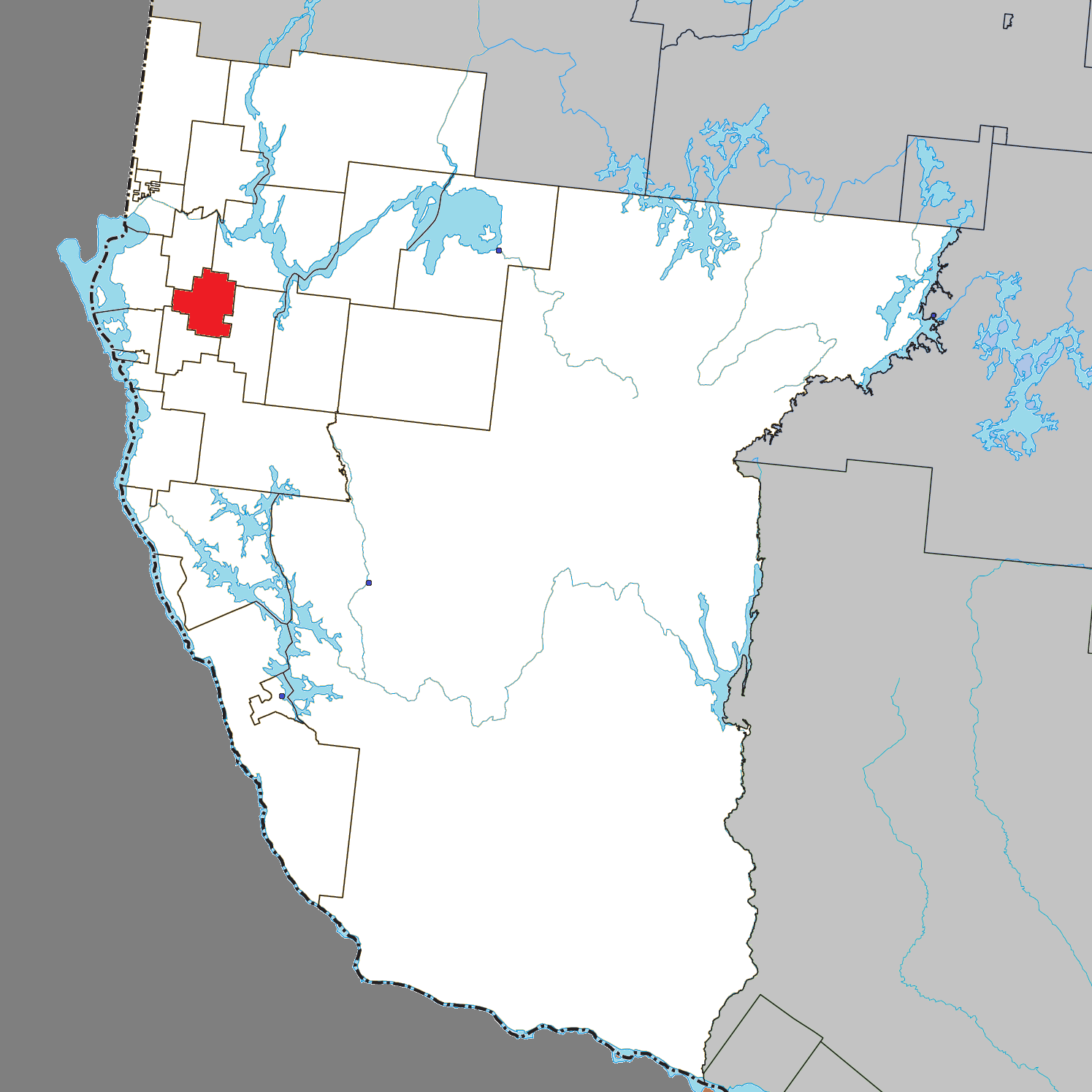
- Location within Témiscamingue RCM

- Location in western Quebec
- Coordinates: 47°26′N 79°18′W
- Country: Canada
- Province: Quebec
- Region: Abitibi-Témiscamingue
- RCM: Témiscamingue
- Municipality: Laverlochère-Angliers
- Constituted: October 3, 1912
- Amalgamated: January 1, 2018

Government
  - Mayor: Daniel Barrette
  - Federal riding: Abitibi—Témiscamingue
  - Prov. riding: Rouyn-Noranda–Témiscamingue

Area
  - Total: 106.80 km^{2} (41.24 sq mi)
  - Land: 105.08 km^{2} (40.57 sq mi)

Population (2016)
  - Total: 675
  - Density: 6.4/km^{2} (17/sq mi)
  - Pop (2011–16): ▼7.7%
  - Dwellings: 321
- Time zone: UTC−05:00 (EST)
  - Summer (DST): UTC−04:00 (EDT)
- Postal code(s): J0Z 2P0
- Area code: 819

Laverlochère (French pronunciation: [lavɛʁlɔʃɛʁ]) is a former municipality in northwestern Quebec, Canada, in the Témiscamingue Regional County Municipality. It is one of the two sectors in the municipality of Laverlochère-Angliers.

== History ==
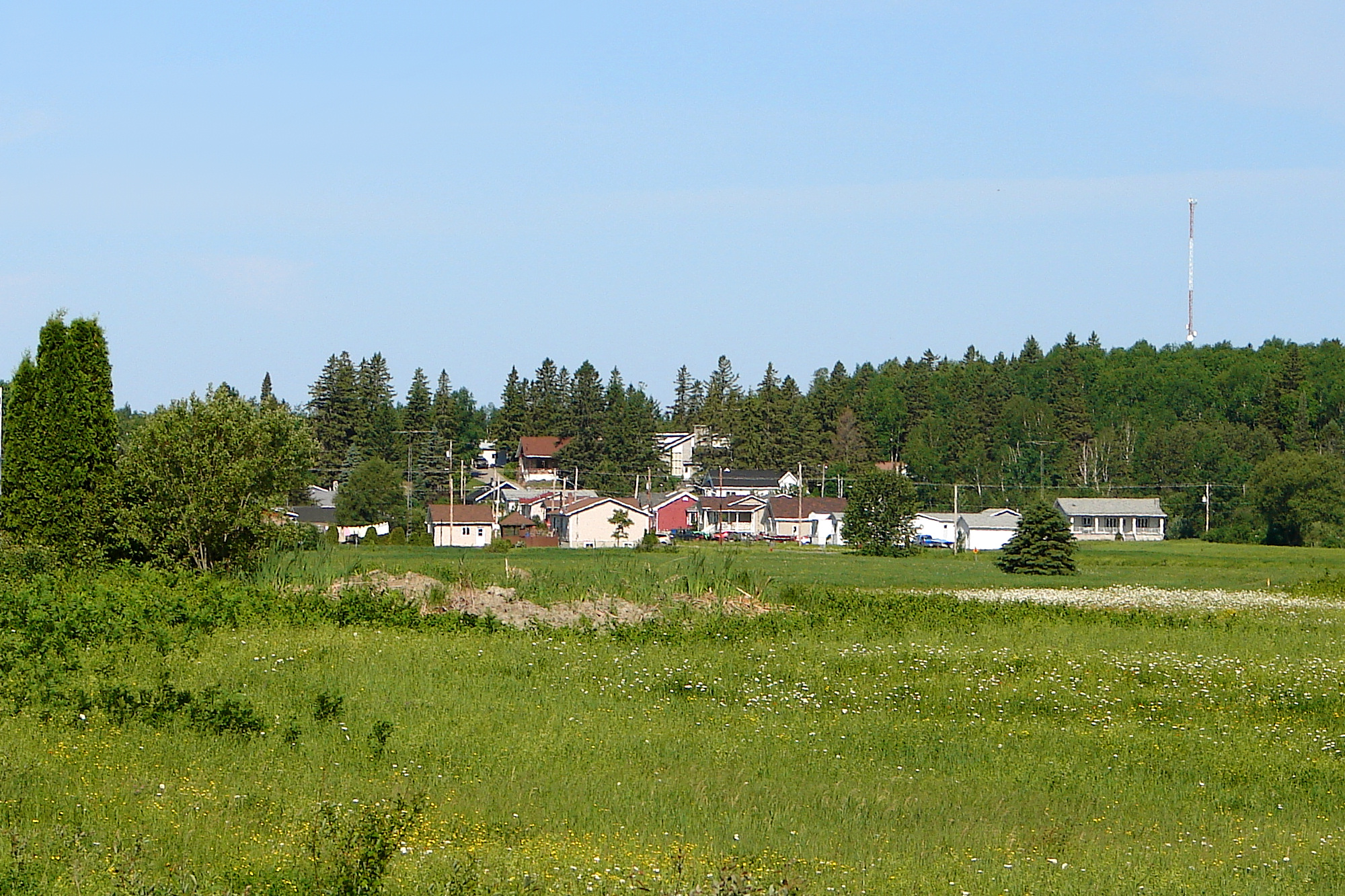

In 1895, the geographic township of Laverlochère was created and began to see its first settlers. At the beginning of the 20th century, the parish of St-Isidore-de-Laverlochère was founded, named after the patron saint of farmers Isidore the Laborer.

The Parish Municipality of Saint-Isidore was formed in 1912, when it separated from Township Municipality of Guigues and the United Township Municipality of Laverlochère-et-Baby.

In June 1977, it was renamed to the Parish Municipality of Laverlochère in honor of Jean-Nicolas Laverlochère, who was a missionary in the Témiscamingue region for more than 40 years. On September 21, 2002, Laverlochère changed statutes and became a regular municipality.

It amalgamated with the Village of Angliers on January 1, 2018, to form the Municipality of Laverlochère-Angliers.

== Demographics ==
Canada census – Laverlochère community profile

	2016
Population	675 (-7.7% from 2011)
Land area	105.08 km^{2} (40.57 sq mi)
Population density	6.4/km^{2} (17/sq mi)
Median age	42.8 (M: 41.6, F: 44.4)
Private dwellings	321 (total) 289 (occupied)
Median household income	$63,040

Notes: 2016 was the last census of Laverlochère as an incorporated municipality.
References: 2016

Historical census populations – Laverlochère

Year	Pop.	±%
1921	675	—
1931	915	+35.6%
1941	919	+0.4%
1951	878	−4.5%
1956	922	+5.0%
1961	884	−4.1%
1966	962	+8.8%
1971	819	−14.9%
1976	772	−5.7%

Year	Pop.	±%
1981	812	+5.2%
1986	843	+3.8%
1991	854	+1.3%
1996	813	−4.8%
2001	757	−6.9%
2006	732	−3.3%
2011	731	−0.1%
2016	675	−7.7%

Population figures based on revised counts.
Source: Statistics Canada

Mother tongue (2016):

- English as first language: 1.5%
- French as first language: 98.5%
- English and French as first language: 0%
- Other as first language: 0%

== Local government ==
List of former mayors:

- Adélard Grignon (1912–1914)
- Joseph Lalonde (1914–1916)
- Jacob Brouillard (1916–1917, 1919–1921)
- Philippe Bergeron (1917–1919)
- Euzèbe Tétreault (1921–1923)
- Joseph Firmin Narcisse Legault (1923–1927)
- Philias Gauthier (1927–1929)
- Louis Philippe Bergeron (1929–1935)
- Aristide Ritchot (1935–1947)
- Armand Lafrenière (1947–1953)
- Jean Baptiste Racicot (1953–1955)
- Donatien Rivest (1955–1963)
- Gérard Deault (1963–1965)
- Alphonse Côté (1965–1967)
- Eddy Neveu (1967–1969)
- Normand Lafrenière (1969–1974)
- Edouard Bournival (1974–1977)
- Ronald Lafrenière (1977–1997)
- Gérald Morin (1997–2001)
- Normand Bergeron (2001–2009)
- Daniel Barrette (2009–2017)

== See also ==
- List of former municipalities in Quebec
- 21st-century municipal history of Quebec
