= Brother Moffet house =

Oldest building in Ville-Marie, Quebec, Canada

- Maison du Frère-Moffet (French)
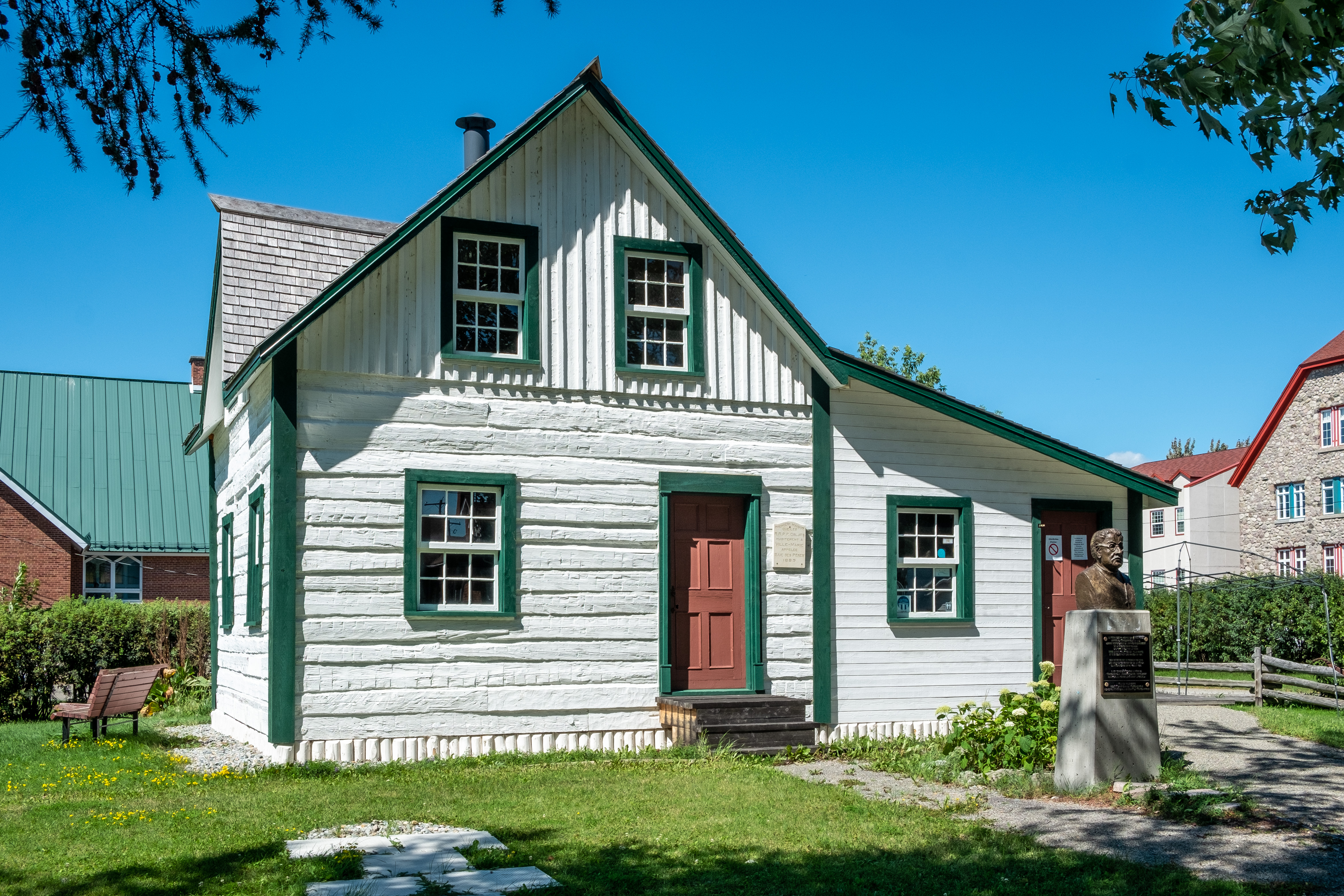
- Brother Moffet house in Ville-Marie, Quebec, Canada (photo taken in August 2020)

- Location within Quebec Location within Western Quebec
- 47°19′55″N 79°26′34″W
- Location: 7, rue Notre-Dame-de-Lourdes; Ville Marie, Quebec; Canada

History
- Founded: 1881

Patrimoine culturel du Québec
- Designated: 2005
- Type: House
- Material: Wood

The Brother Moffet house (Maison du Frère-Moffet, in French) is an old building located in Ville-Marie, Quebec (Canada).

This one-story house comprising a first floor and an attic was built in 1881 at the instigation of Oblate Brother Joseph Moffet, considered the "Father of Témiscamingue".

The oldest building in Ville-Marie, it has been moved five times since its construction. Classified as a heritage building in 1978, its last relocation in 1979 triggered a new classification procedure in 2005. Since 1980, a museum occupies the house since 1980.

== History ==
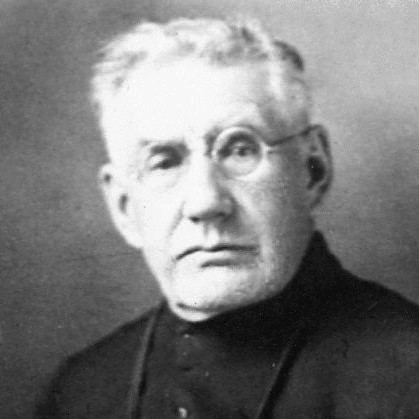
Joseph Moffet.

The settlement of the Ottawa Valley and the establishment of a communications network along the Ottawa River in the early 19th century opened up Témiscamingue, at the head of the waters, to colonization. The Oblates of Mary Immaculate arrived in Témiscamingue in 1863 and established the Saint-Claude mission in the vicinity of Fort Témiscamingue, a former trading post.

In 1872 Brother Joseph Moffet arrived at the mission and was assigned to provide food. He soon discovered that the soil around the mission was not very fertile. In 1874, he found land at the head of Kelly Bay (now Baie des Pères), 5 km north of the mission. With the approval of his superior, he began to clear the land. He obtained permission to establish a farm there in 1879.

A small house was built on the farm site in 1881 to house employees and visiting missionaries. A barn was added the following year. It was the only building on Kelly Bay until the village was established in 1886. Harvests soon exceeded the community's needs. Surpluses were sold to lumber companies and to the Haileybury market in Ontario. The house was then located on the site of the current building of the Regional County Municipality of Témiscamingue. The canonical parish of Ville-Marie was erected in 1886; occasionally at this time, the house served as a temporary residence for newly arrived families.

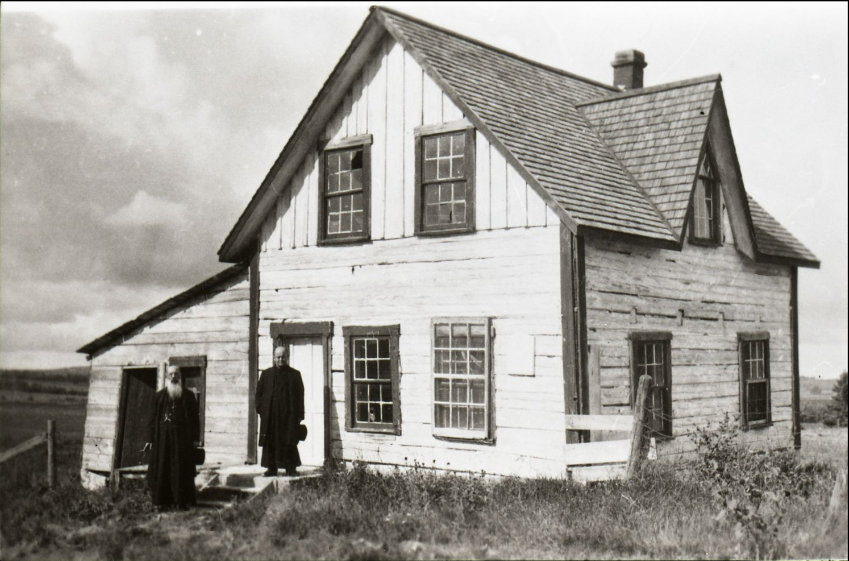
Brother Moffet house in the early 1950s.

In 1908 the house was first moved to make way for the Sisters of Charity of Ottawa boarding school. It was later used as a coach house. From 1930 to 1936, the house was occupied by the residential school's janitor, before being abandoned. In 1949 it was acquired by the Société d'histoire du Témiscamingue. In 1952, the Société began collecting artifacts for the museum. The house was moved a second time in 1954 to the grounds of the Brother Moffet agricultural school. It was restored, but its lean-to was demolished. The body of Brother Moffet was also repatriated, his remains buried next to the house. The house was restored again in 1958, using materials from buildings in Fort Témiscamingue, including the door and its hand-crafted lock.

In 1973 the Oblates sold their land, coveted by a local entrepreneur. The house was moved to the edge of town, on land near a ravine. The city left it abandoned, seeing no interest in it. Brother Moffet's remains were moved with those of other Oblates to the Ville-Marie cemetery. The Société d'histoire du Témiscamingue took steps to protect the house and sought to finance its restoration. In early 1978, the house was moved to the grounds of the former Brother Moffet agricultural school.

The house was classified as a heritage building on November 27, 1978 by the Minister of Cultural Affairs. The following year, the churchwardens of Notre-Dame-du-Rosaire church offered the Société d'histoire a plot of land near the church, where the house was moved for a fifth time. It was restored with new foundations, and several beams and all the windows were replaced. It was opened to the public as a museum in 1980, under the name of "Maison du Colon" (The Settler's House).

In 2003 it underwent a new restoration campaign. The museum reverted to its former name of "Maison du Frère-Moffet" (Brother Moffet House). On December 1, 2005, a technical classification was carried out, so that the registration of the building's base in the Land Register would mention its heritage protection status. In 2015, the house was once again restored. A bronze bust of Brother Moffet, by sculptor Philippe Scrive, was installed in front of the entrance.

== Architecture ==
The building is a square, one-storey attic house. It was made of squared planks assembled in dovetail joints. The gable roof features a dormer window and is covered with cedar shingles. Windows are rectangular and hung-sash; doors are made of wood panels. The windows are made of wood, and the dovetails are covered with corner boards.

With its locally sourced materials and architectural simplicity, this house is representative of Temiscamian vernacular dwellings, being the oldest building here.

== Exposition ==
The museum presents a permanent exhibition entitled De la Terre et des Hommes (Of Land and Men), dedicated to Brother Moffet and the history of the first wave of Témiscamingue colonization, which took place between 1881 and 1920. The museum also presents a different temporary exhibition each year.

== See also ==
- List of historic places in Abitibi-Témiscamingue

== Bibliography ==
- Boileau, Gilles (2001). "Le Témiscamingue, entre le peuplement volontaire et la colonisation organisée" [Témiscamingue, between voluntary settlement and organized colonization]. Histoire Québec (in French). 6 (3): 28–32. ISSN 1201-4710.
- Trépanier, Paul (1990). "La maison du colon" [The Settler's House]. Continuité (in French) (48): 60–61. ISSN 0714-9476.
