= Barrière River (Quinze Lake) =

Barrière
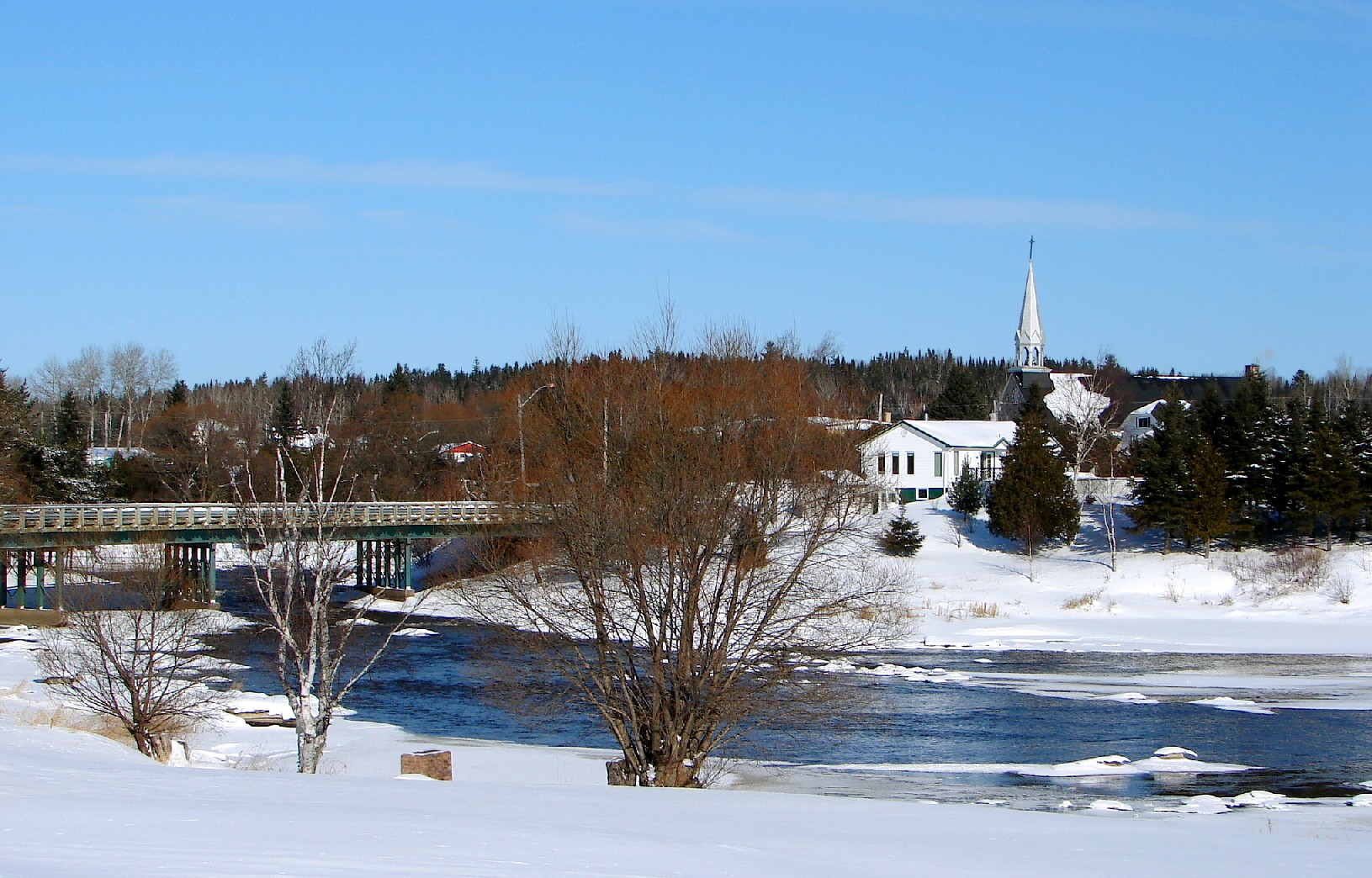
- Barrière River at Remigny

Location
- Country: Canada
- Province: Quebec
- Region: Abitibi-Témiscamingue
- Municipality: Rémigny

Physical characteristics
- Source: Rémigny Lake
  - location: Rémigny
  - coordinates: 47°45′50″N 79°12′55″W
  - elevation: 266 m (873 ft)
- Mouth: Des Quinze River
  - location: Rémigny
  - coordinates: 47°45′20″N 79°12′24″W
  - elevation: 258 m (846 ft)
- Length: 1.0 km (0.62 mi)

Basin features
- Progression: Des Quinze Lake→ Ottawa River→ St. Lawrence River→ Gulf of St. Lawrence

The Barrière River (French: Rivière Barrière, pronounced [ʁivjɛʁ baʁjɛʁ]) is a tributary of the Des Quinze Lake, flowing in the municipality of Rémigny, in the Témiscamingue Regional County Municipality of the Abitibi-Témiscamingue administrative region, Quebec, Canada.

Recreational tourism activities are the main economic activity of the sector; agriculture, second.

Annually, the surface of the river is generally frozen from mid-November to late April, however, the period of safe ice circulation is usually from mid-December to early April.

== Geography ==
The hydrographic slopes near the Barrière River are:

- North side: Rémigny Lake, Barrier Lake;
- East side: Des Quinze Lake (Tigre Bay), Lac Lebret, Beaumesnil Lake;
- South side: Des Quinze Lake (Barrière Bay), Ottawa River;
- West side: Prévost Lake, Wright Creek, Burwash Creek.

The Barriere River has its source on the south shore of Rémigny Lake (length: 23.8 kilometres (14.8 mi); altitude: 266 metres (873 ft)) in the southern part of the town of Rémigny.

From its source, the Barrière River flows over 1.0 kilometre (0.62 mi) according to the following segments:

- 0.5 kilometres (0.31 mi) Southeast passing the west side of the village of Rémigny to the bridge over the Barrière River;
- 0.5 kilometres (0.31 mi) Northeast from the west side of the village to its mouth.

The Barrière River flows on the North shore of the Des Quinze Lake. This mouth is located at:

- 1.7 kilometres (1.1 mi) Southeast of the mouth of the Barriere Lake;
- 1.4 kilometres (0.87 mi) South of the bridge over the Barrière River to the village of Rémigny;

North of the mouth of the Quinze Lake;

- 29.1 kilometres (18.1 mi) Northeast of Lake Timiskaming.

== Toponymy ==
The term "Barrière" is a family name of French origin.

The toponym "Barrière River" was formalized on December 5, 1968, at the Commission de toponymie du Québec, i.e. at the creation of the Commission.

== See also ==
- List of rivers of Quebec
