= Laverlochère-Angliers =

- Municipality
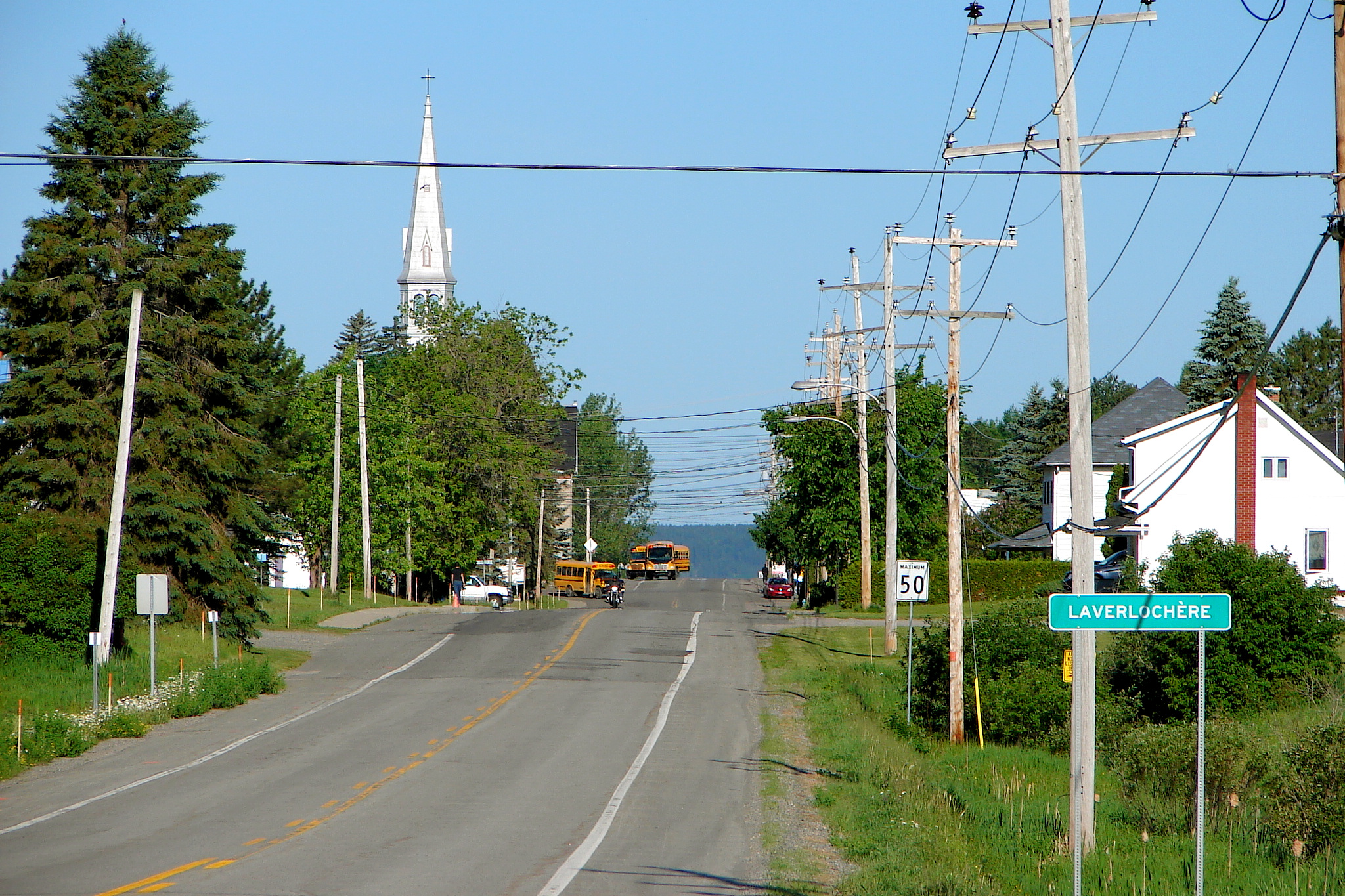
- Entrance of Laverlochère-Angliers

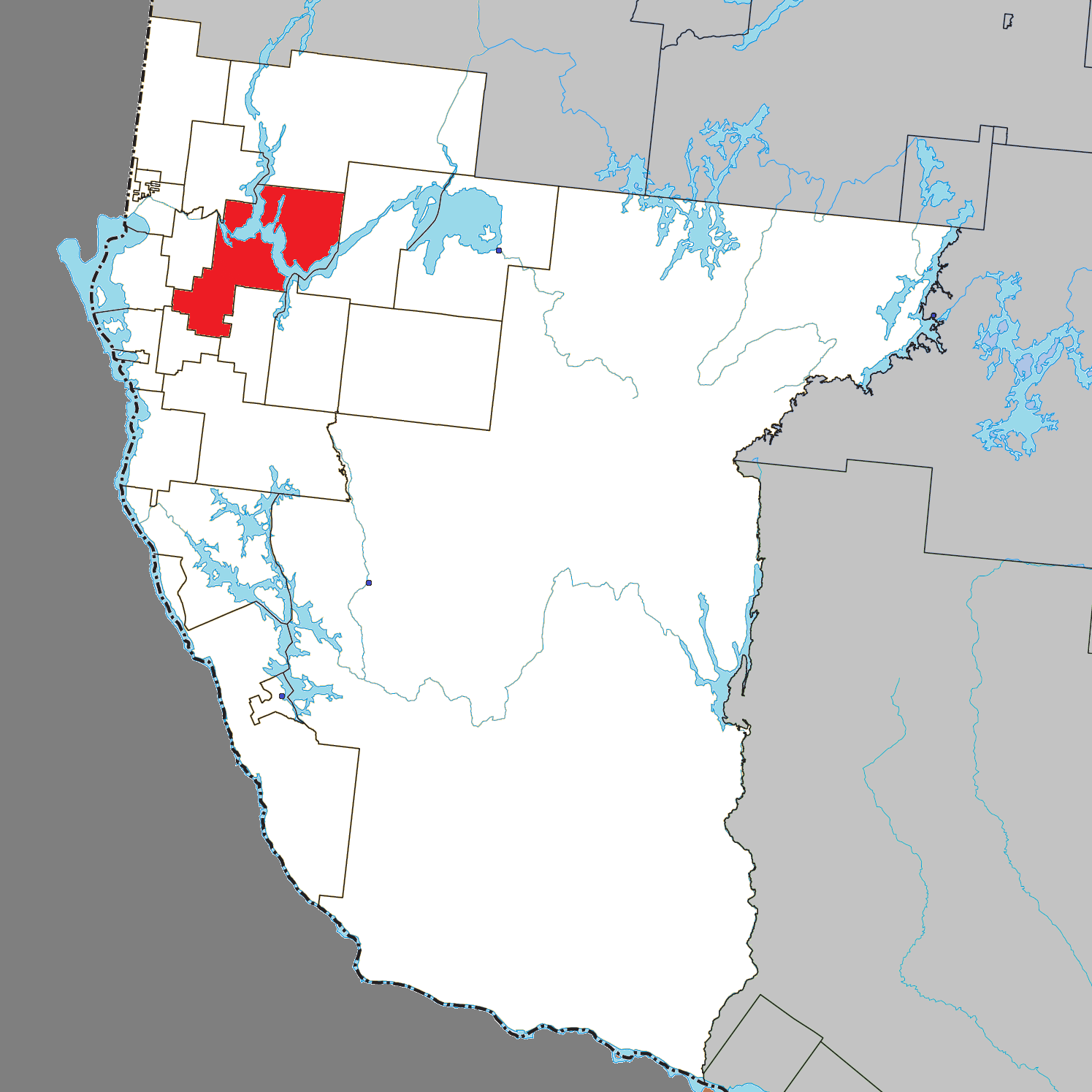
- Location within Témiscamingue RCM

- Location in western Quebec
- Coordinates: 47°26′N 79°18′W
- Country: Canada
- Province: Quebec
- Region: Abitibi-Témiscamingue
- RCM: Témiscamingue
- Constituted: January 1, 2018
- Named for: Jean-Nicolas Laverlochère and Angliers

Government
  - Mayor: Normand Bergeron
  - Federal riding: Abitibi—Témiscamingue
  - Prov. riding: Rouyn-Noranda–Témiscamingue

Area
  - Total: 491.32 km^{2} (189.70 sq mi)
  - Land: 400.83 km^{2} (154.76 sq mi)

Population (2021)
  - Total: 947
  - Density: 2.4/km^{2} (6.2/sq mi)
  - Pop (2016-21): ▼3.2%
  - Dwellings: 525
- Time zone: UTC−05:00 (EST)
  - Summer (DST): UTC−04:00 (EDT)
- Postal code(s): J0Z 2P0
- Area code: 819
- Highways: R-382 R-391
- Website: www.laverlochere-angliers.org

Laverlochère-Angliers (French pronunciation: [lavɛʁlɔʃɛʁ ɑ̃ɡlije]) is a municipality in northwestern Quebec, Canada, in the Témiscamingue Regional County Municipality.

== History ==
Laverlochère-Angliers was created on January 1, 2018, through the merger of the Municipality of Laverlochère and the Village of Angliers.

== Demographics ==
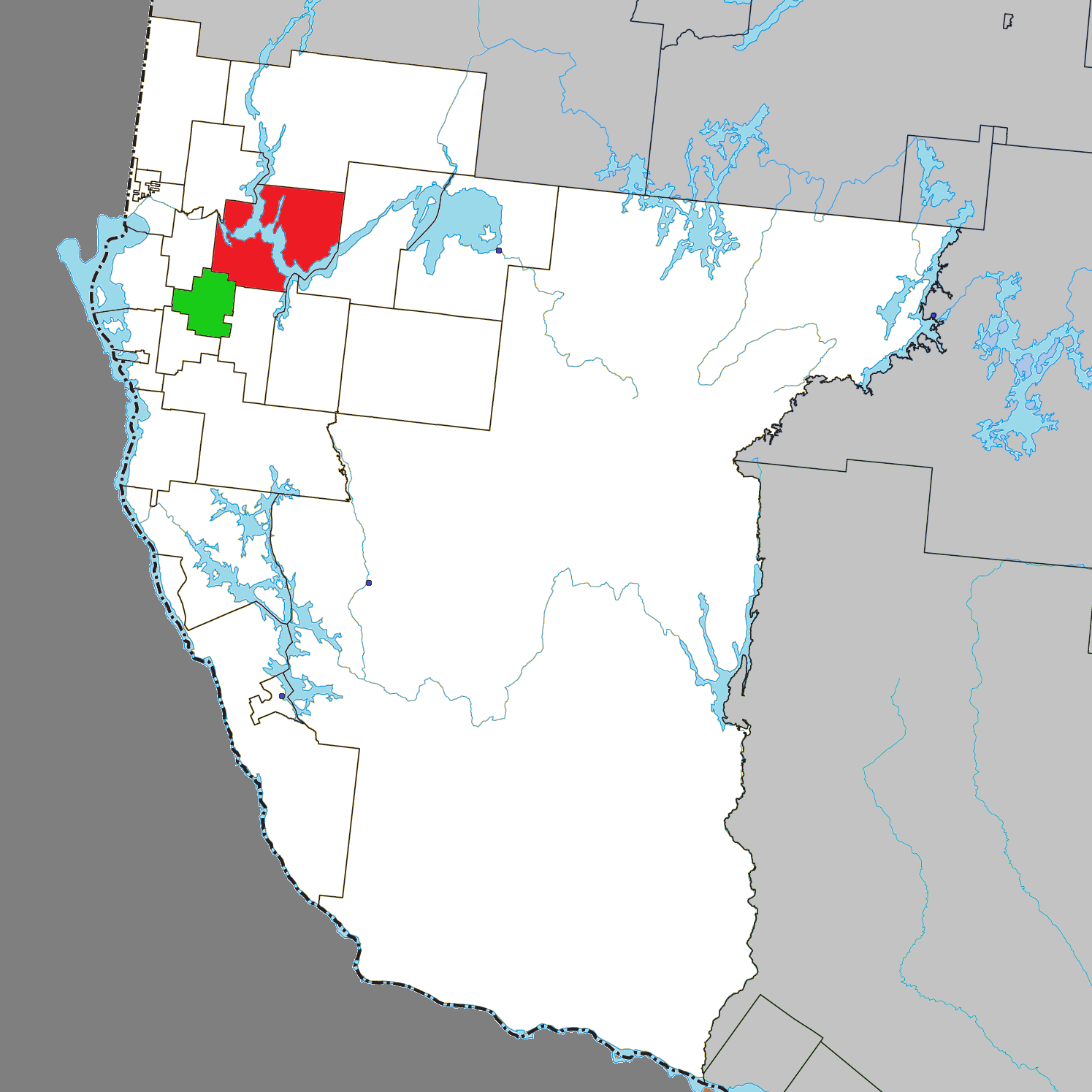
Former municipalities of Laverlochère (green) and Angliers (red) before the 2017 merging.

In the 2016 Census of Population conducted by Statistics Canada, the former Village of Angliers recorded a population of 303 living in 139 of its 218 total private dwellings, a 1.7% change from its 2011 population of 298. With a land area of 298.21 km^{2} (115.14 sq mi), it had a population density of 1.0/km^{2} (2.6/sq mi) in 2016.

Also in 2016, the former Municipality of Laverlochère recorded a population of 675 living in 289 of its 321 total private dwellings, a −7.7% change from its 2011 population of 731. With a land area of 105.08 km^{2} (40.57 sq mi), it had a population density of 6.4/km^{2} (16.6/sq mi) in 2016.

Combined, the amalgamated Municipality of Laverlochère-Angliers has a population of 947 living in 443 of its 525 total private dwellings as of 2021, a −3.2% change from its 2016 population of 987. With a land area of 400.83 km^{2} (154.76 sq mi), it had a population density of 2.4/km^{2} (6.1/sq mi) in 2021.

Canada census – Laverlochère-Angliers community profile

	2021
Population	947 (-3.2% from 2016)
Land area	400.83 km^{2} (154.76 sq mi)
Population density	2.4/km^{2} (6.2/sq mi)
Median age	46.8 (M: 46.4, F: 47.2)
Private dwellings	525 (total) 443 (occupied)
Median household income	$69,000

References: 2021

Historical census populations – Laverlochère-Angliers
Year / Pop. / ±%; 2016 / 978 / —	Year / Pop. / ±%; 2021 / 947 / −3.2%
Source: Statistics Canada

=== Language ===
Canada Census Mother Tongue - Laverlochère-Angliers, Quebec
Census	Total	French			English			French & English			Other		
Year	Responses	Count	Trend	Pop %	Count	Trend	Pop %	Count	Trend	Pop %	Count	Trend	Pop %
2021	950	900	▼4.3%	94.7%	25	▼16.7%	2.6%	10	▲ n/a%	1.1%	15	▲ n/a%	1.6%
2016	980	940	n/a	95.9%	30	n/a	3.1%	0	n/a	0.0%	0	n/a	0.0%

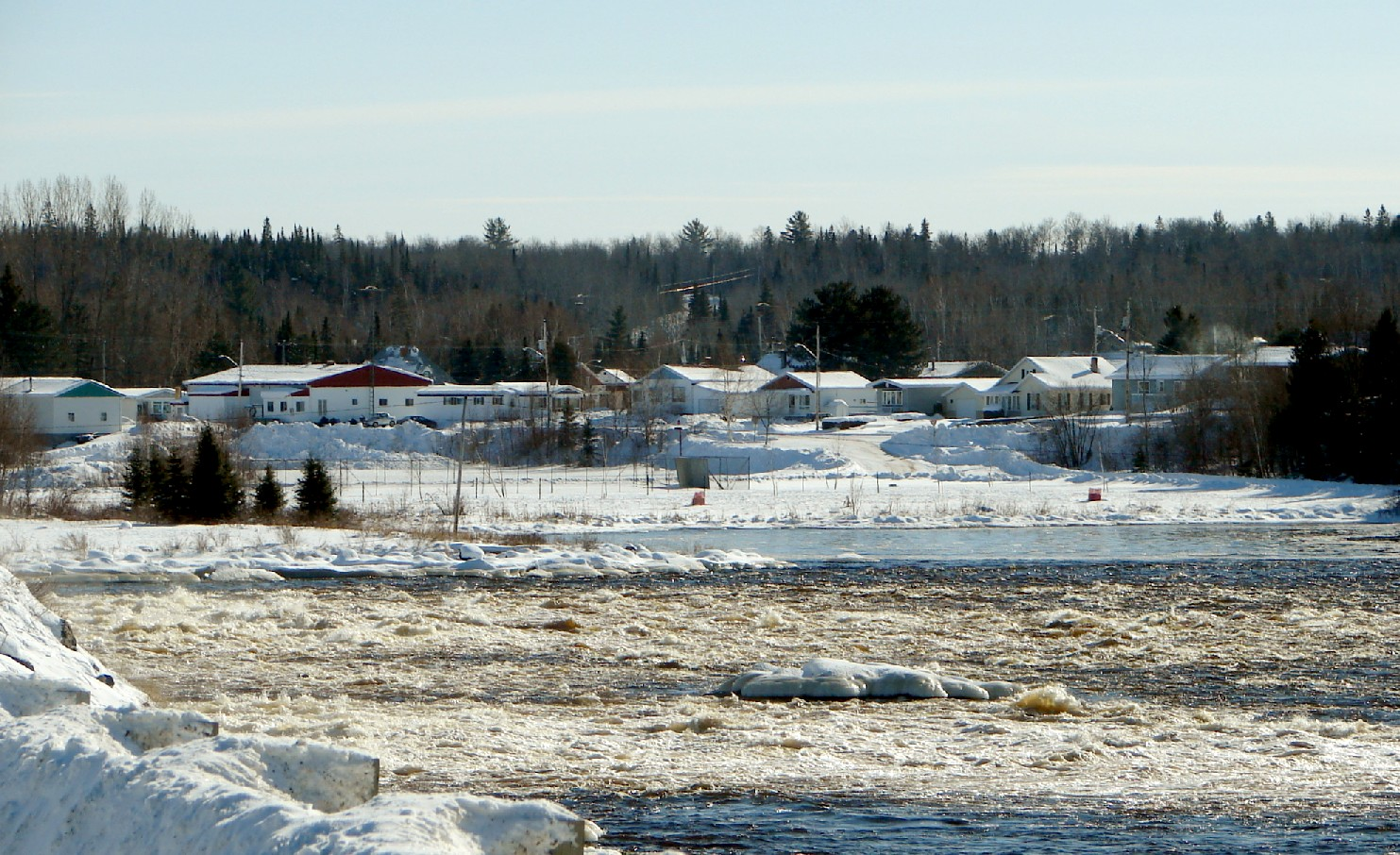
Ottawa River at the outlet of Lac des Quinze in Angliers

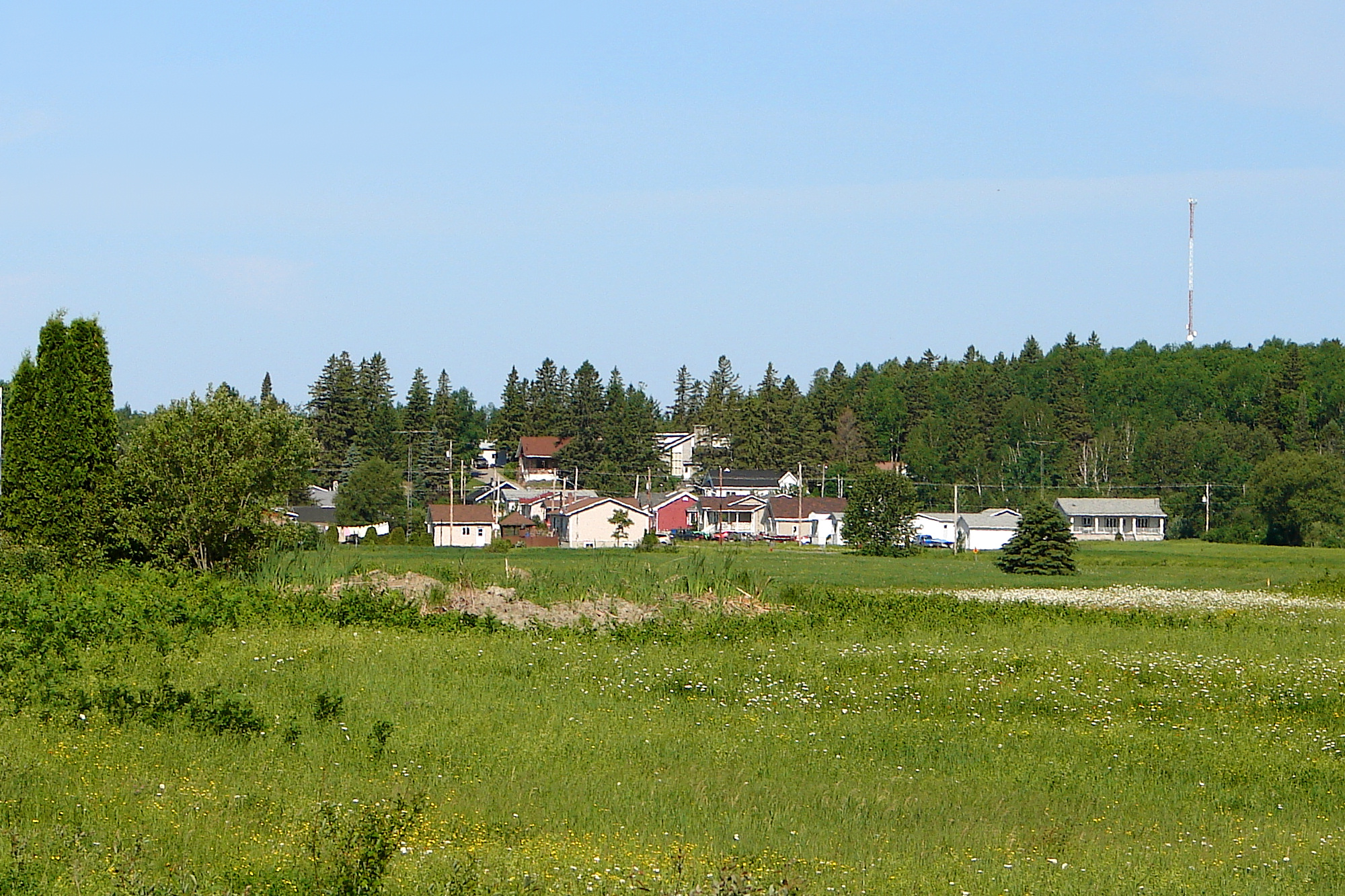
Housing in Laverlochère

== Government ==
List of former mayors since formation:

- Daniel Barrette (2018–2023)
- Normand Bergeron (2023–present)

== See also ==
- List of municipalities in Quebec
