= Quebec Route 391 =

Highway in Quebec, Canada

Route 391

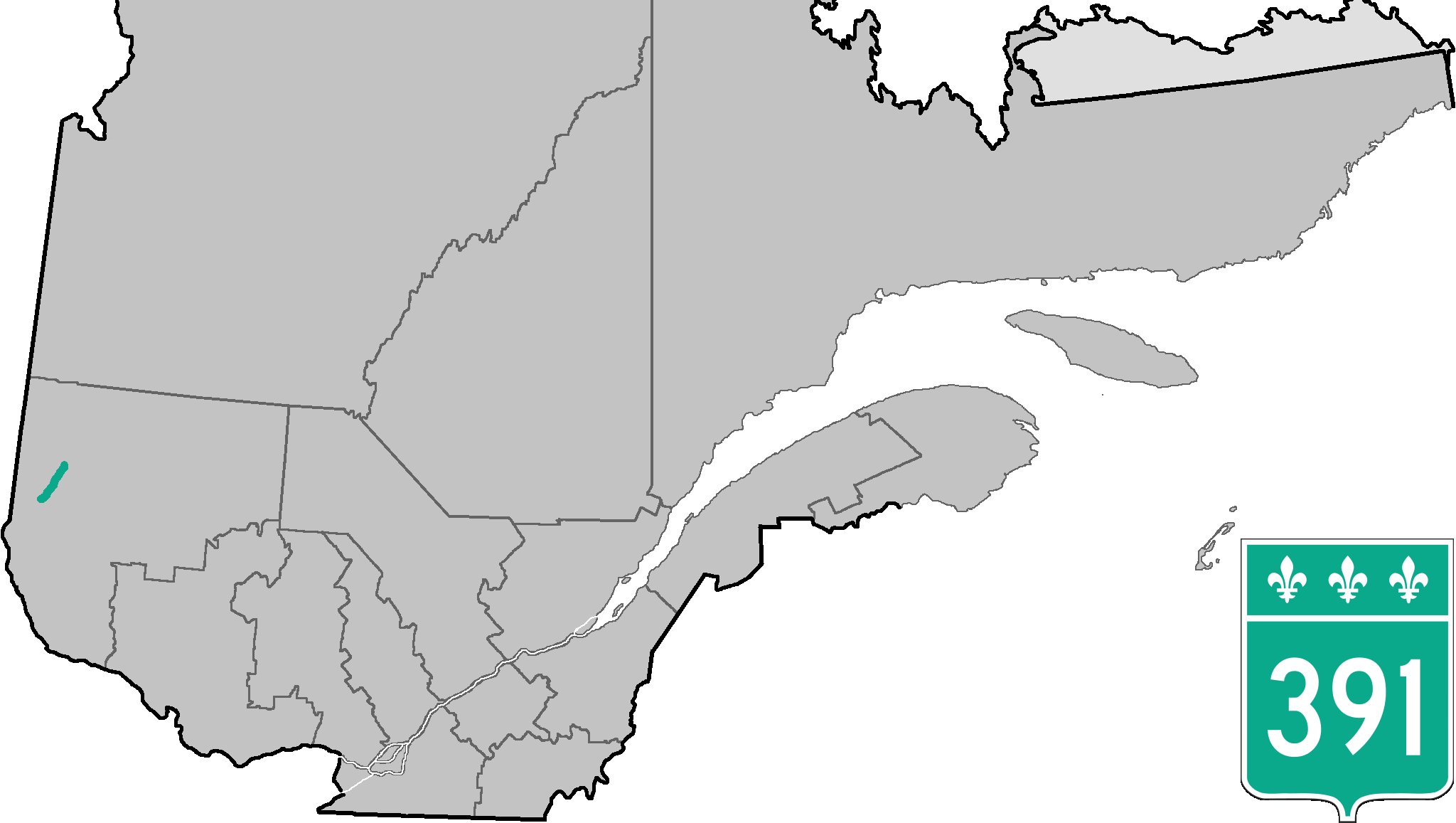

Route information
- Maintained by Transports Québec
- Length: 90 km (56 mi)

Major junctions
- South end: R-101 north of Saint-Edouard-de-Fabre
- North end: R-117 (TCH) in Rouyn-Noranda

Location
- Country: Canada
- Province: Quebec
- Major cities: Rouyn-Noranda

Highway system
- Quebec provincial highways; Autoroutes; List; Former
| ← R-390 | → R-393 |

Route 391 is a provincial highway located in the Abitibi-Témiscamingue region in southwestern Quebec near the Ontario border. The 90 km (56 mi) road runs from the junction of Route 101 near St-Édouard-de-Fabre and ends in Rouyn-Noranda at the junction of Route 117. Between Lorrainville and Laverlochère-Angliers, it overlaps Route 382. Near Rollet, it is also concurrent with Route 101.

== Towns along Route 391 ==
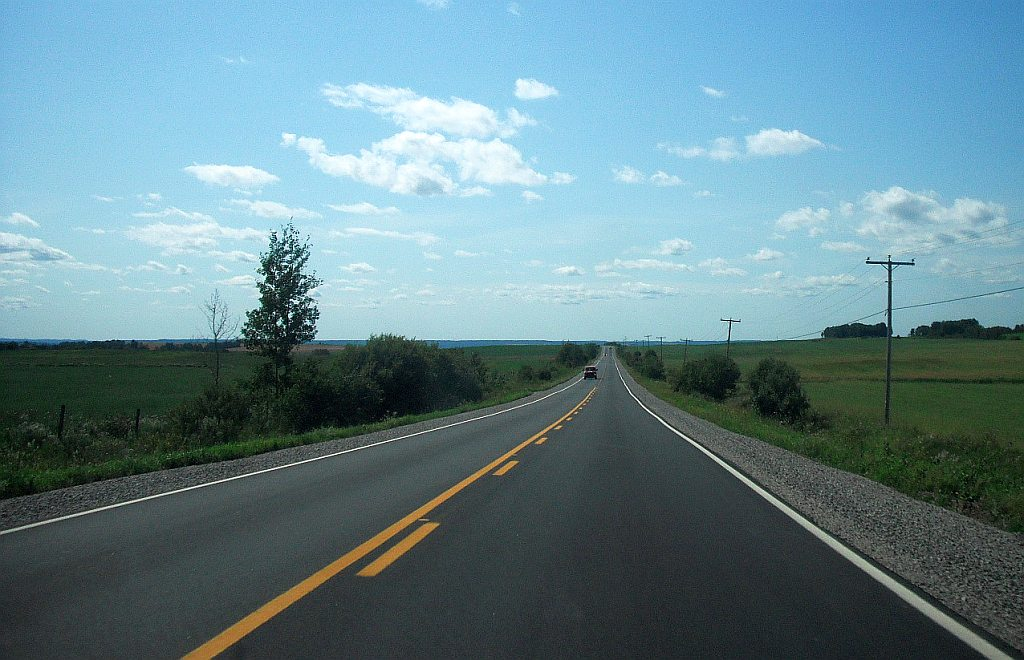
Quebec Route 391 in Saint-Eugène-de-Guigues

- Saint-Édouard-de-Fabre
- Béarn
- Lorrainville
- Laverlochère-Angliers
- Saint-Eugène-de-Guigues
- Guérin
- Rémigny
- Rouyn-Noranda

== See also ==
- List of Quebec provincial highways
