= Jean-Nicolas Laverlochère =

French missionary in Canada

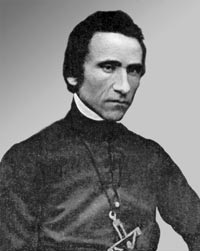
Jean-Nicolas Laverlochère

Jean-Nicolas Laverlochère (December 6, 1812 in St. Georges d'Espérance, Grenoble, France – October 4, 1884 in Témiscaming, Quebec) was a French missionary in Canada.

== Life ==
Laverlochère began his religious life as a lay brother in the Congregation of the Oblates, but feeling called to evangelize the natives of Canada, he was allowed to study for the priesthood, and was ordained on May 5, 1844 at L'Acadie, near Montreal.

He was a missionary in the Saguenay district from 1844 to 1847, at Abitibi, Moose Factory, and other posts on Hudson Bay from 1847 to 1863. In 1851, he suffered a stroke of palsy. He was at Plattsburgh, New York from 1863 to 1868, and on Lake Timiskaming from 1868 to his death in 1884.

He is buried in the Catholic cemetery of Fort Témiscamingue.

== Writings ==
Alone or in collaboration with others, Laverlochère published a number of devotional books in Maskekon and Cree. His letters in the Annales de la Propagation de la Foi attracted wide attention. He was the author of Mission de la Baie d' Hudson: Lettre de Mgr. l'Evêque de Bytown (n.p., 1848). He also compiled an Algonquin-French dictionary. His manuscripts were left to his successor and companion, André Garin.

== Legacy ==
Due to his work to convert the native tribes to Catholicism, Laverlochère is sometimes called the "Apostle of Hudson Bay."

Laverlochère-Angliers, a municipality in Témiscamingue county, Quebec, founded 1904, was named for him.

== Bibliography ==
- (in French) Gaston Carrière, Missionnaire sans toit: le P. Jean-Nicolas Laverlochère, O.M.I., 1811-1884. Montreal: Rayonnement, 1963
- W. Stewart Wallace, ed., The Encyclopedia of Canada, Vol. IV, Toronto: University Associates of Canada, 1948, p. 5, available here
- James Constantine Pilling, Bibliography of the Algonquin Languages. Washington: Government Printing Office, 1891, available here
