= Rémigny, Quebec =

Rémigny
- Municipality
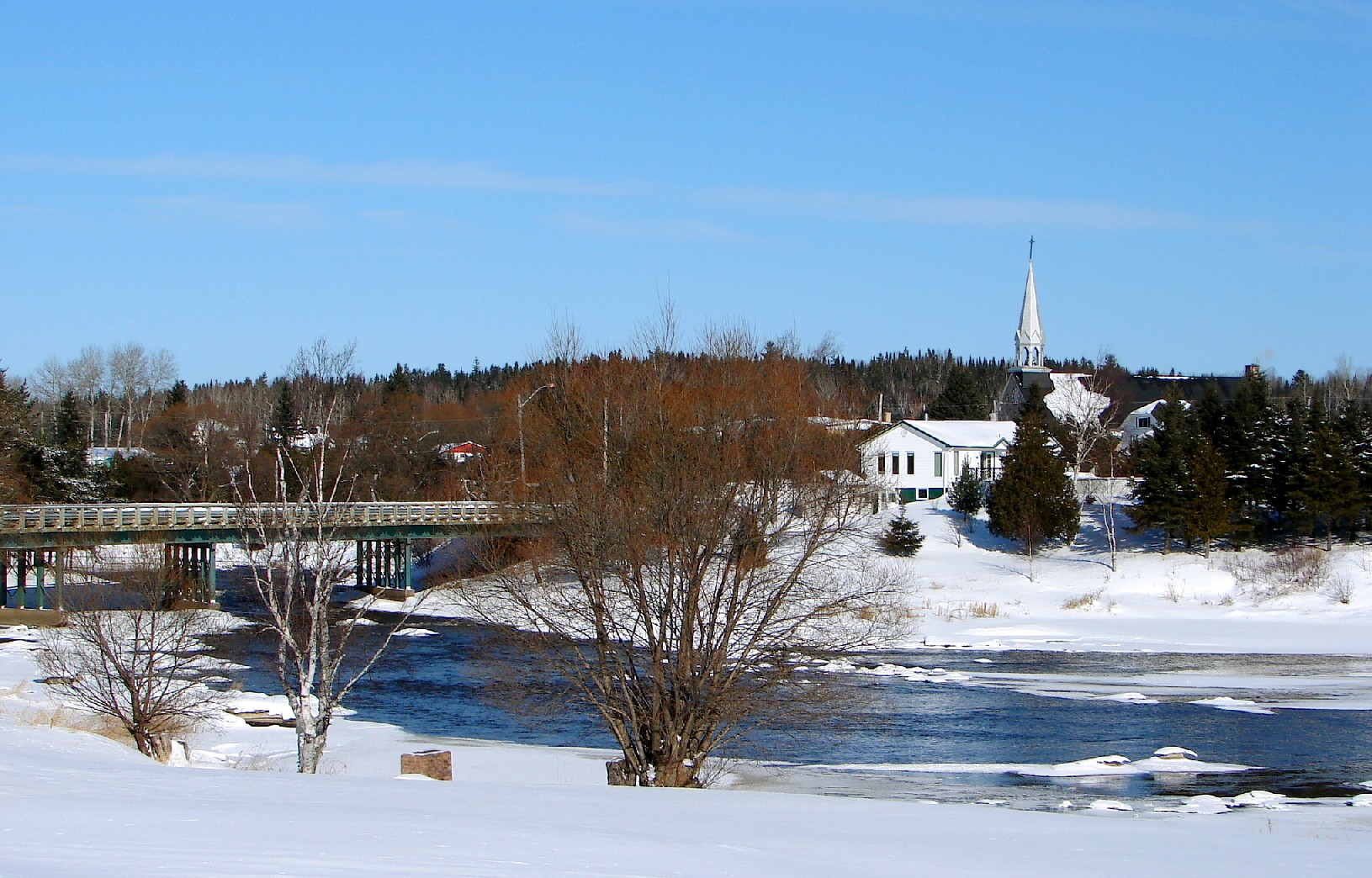

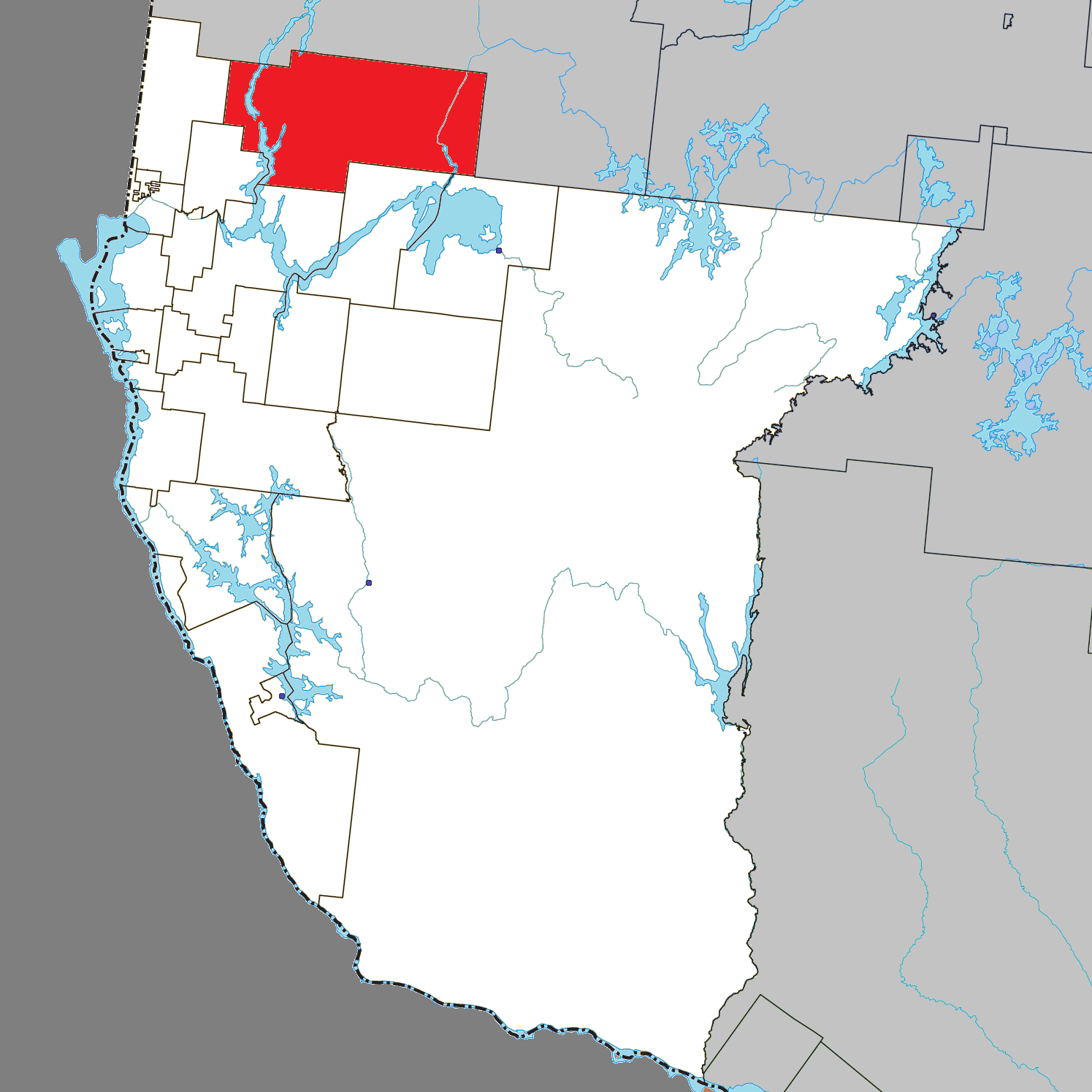
- Location within Témiscamingue RCM

- Location in western Quebec
- Coordinates: 47°46′N 79°12′W
- Country: Canada
- Province: Quebec
- Region: Abitibi-Témiscamingue
- RCM: Témiscamingue
- Settled: 1935
- Constituted: 1 January 1978
- Named for: Captain Rémigny

Government
  - Mayor: Cathy Bruneau
  - Federal riding: Abitibi—Témiscamingue
  - Prov. riding: Rouyn-Noranda–Témiscamingue

Area
  - Total: 997.32 km^{2} (385.07 sq mi)
  - Land: 894.05 km^{2} (345.19 sq mi)

Population (2021)
  - Total: 287
  - Density: 0.3/km^{2} (0.78/sq mi)
  - Pop (2016–21): ▲2.5%
  - Dwellings: 148
- Time zone: UTC−05:00 (EST)
  - Summer (DST): UTC−04:00 (EDT)
- Postal code(s): J0Z 3H0
- Area code: 819
- Highways: R-101; R-391
- Website: www.municipalite remigny.qc.ca

Rémigny (French pronunciation: [ʁemiɲi]) is a municipality in northwestern Quebec, Canada, in the Témiscamingue Regional County Municipality. The town centre is located along the Barrière River.

== History ==
In 1920, the geographic township of Rémigny was formed, named after Captain Rémigny of the Régiment de la Sarre, who was made a Knight of the Order of Saint Louis in 1759 and captain of Grenadier Company in 1760. The community had its start in 1935 when sixty settlers from Joliette arrived on the northern shores of Barrière Bay of Des Quinze Lake as part of the Vautrin Settlement Plan. In 1978, the place was incorporated and named after the township.

== Geography ==
=== Climate ===
Climate data for Rémigny, Quebec, 47°43′N 79°14′W, elevation 289.9 m (951 ft)
Month	Jan	Feb	Mar	Apr	May	Jun	Jul	Aug	Sep	Oct	Nov	Dec	Year
Record high °C (°F)	7.2 (45.0)	11.0 (51.8)	19.0 (66.2)	29.1 (84.4)	32.2 (90.0)	35.0 (95.0)	37.8 (100.0)	36.1 (97.0)	31.1 (88.0)	25.0 (77.0)	17.8 (64.0)	14.5 (58.1)	37.8 (100.0)
Mean daily maximum °C (°F)	−9.3 (15.3)	−6.4 (20.5)	−0.5 (31.1)	8.1 (46.6)	16.6 (61.9)	21.6 (70.9)	24.0 (75.2)	22.6 (72.7)	16.9 (62.4)	9.7 (49.5)	1.0 (33.8)	−5.8 (21.6)	8.2 (46.8)
Daily mean °C (°F)	−15.8 (3.6)	−13.4 (7.9)	−7.2 (19.0)	2.0 (35.6)	9.9 (49.8)	14.9 (58.8)	17.6 (63.7)	16.4 (61.5)	11.4 (52.5)	5.1 (41.2)	−3.0 (26.6)	−11.1 (12.0)	2.2 (36.0)
Mean daily minimum °C (°F)	−22.2 (−8.0)	−20.5 (−4.9)	−13.8 (7.2)	−4.1 (24.6)	3.1 (37.6)	8.0 (46.4)	11.1 (52.0)	10.1 (50.2)	5.8 (42.4)	0.5 (32.9)	−7.0 (19.4)	−16.4 (2.5)	−3.8 (25.2)
Record low °C (°F)	−46.0 (−50.8)	−47.0 (−52.6)	−40.0 (−40.0)	−27.8 (−18.0)	−9.4 (15.1)	−6.7 (19.9)	−2.0 (28.4)	−2.0 (28.4)	−7.0 (19.4)	−12.8 (9.0)	−35.0 (−31.0)	−47.0 (−52.6)	−47.0 (−52.6)
Average precipitation mm (inches)	50.0 (1.97)	41.0 (1.61)	50.5 (1.99)	58.8 (2.31)	86.6 (3.41)	85.9 (3.38)	93.0 (3.66)	105.0 (4.13)	101.2 (3.98)	91.8 (3.61)	80.2 (3.16)	59.9 (2.36)	904.0 (35.59)
Average rainfall mm (inches)	5.7 (0.22)	4.8 (0.19)	18.3 (0.72)	47.0 (1.85)	86.0 (3.39)	85.8 (3.38)	93.0 (3.66)	105.0 (4.13)	101.0 (3.98)	87.2 (3.43)	48.7 (1.92)	11.8 (0.46)	694.3 (27.33)
Average snowfall cm (inches)	44.3 (17.4)	36.2 (14.3)	32.2 (12.7)	12.0 (4.7)	0.6 (0.2)	0.1 (0.0)	0.0 (0.0)	0.0 (0.0)	0.2 (0.1)	4.6 (1.8)	31.5 (12.4)	48.1 (18.9)	209.9 (82.6)
Average precipitation days (≥ 0.2 mm)	14.7	11.0	10.1	9.9	11.1	13.1	13.8	11.9	13.9	13.8	13.7	14.4	151.3
Average rainy days (≥ 0.2 mm)	1.2	1.3	3.7	7.7	11.0	13.1	13.8	11.9	13.9	13.0	6.8	1.9	99.1
Average snowy days (≥ 0.2 cm)	13.9	10.0	7.4	3.6	0.3	0.05	0.0	0.0	0.06	1.4	8.2	12.9	57.7
Source: Environment Canada Canadian Climate Normals 1981–2010

== Demographics ==
Canada census – Rémigny, Quebec community profile

	2021	2016	2011
Population	287 (+2.5% from 2016)	280 (+0.4% from 2011)	279 (-12.3% from 2006)
Land area	894.05 km^{2} (345.19 sq mi)	896.26 km^{2} (346.05 sq mi)	896.29 km^{2} (346.06 sq mi)
Population density	0.3/km^{2} (0.78/sq mi)	0.3/km^{2} (0.78/sq mi)	0.3/km^{2} (0.78/sq mi)
Median age	54.4 (M: 54.8, F: 53.6)	52.0 (M: 50.0, F: 52.5)	51.4 (M: 51.5, F: 51.2)
Private dwellings	148 (total) 135 (occupied)	140 (total) 136 (occupied)	154 (total) 135 (occupied)
Median household income	$69,000	$50,688	$45,906

References: 2021 2016 2011

Historical census populations – Rémigny, Quebec

Year	Pop.	±%
1981	440	—
1986	410	−6.8%
1991	381	−7.1%
1996	364	−4.5%
2001	367	+0.8%

Year	Pop.	±%
2006	318	−13.4%
2011	279	−12.3%
2016	280	+0.4%
2021	287	+2.5%

Source: Statistics Canada

Mother tongue (2021):

- English as first language: 5.3%
- French as first language: 94.7%
- English and French as first language: 1.8%
- Other as first language: 0%

== Government ==
List of former mayors:

- Jocelyn Aylwin (...–2013)
- Isabelle Coderre (2017–2022)
- Cathy Bruneau (2022–present)

== Education ==
The Western Québec School Board operates anglophone public schools, including:

- Noranda School in Rouyn-Noranda

== See also ==
- List of municipalities in Quebec
