= Béarn, Quebec =

Béarn
- Municipality
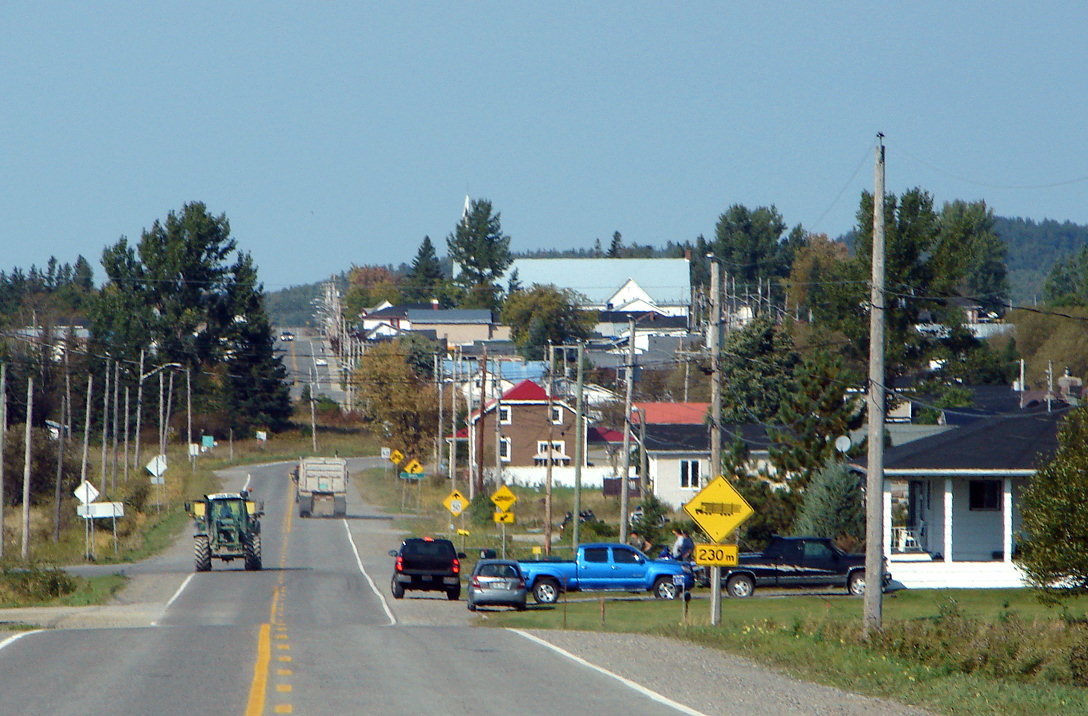

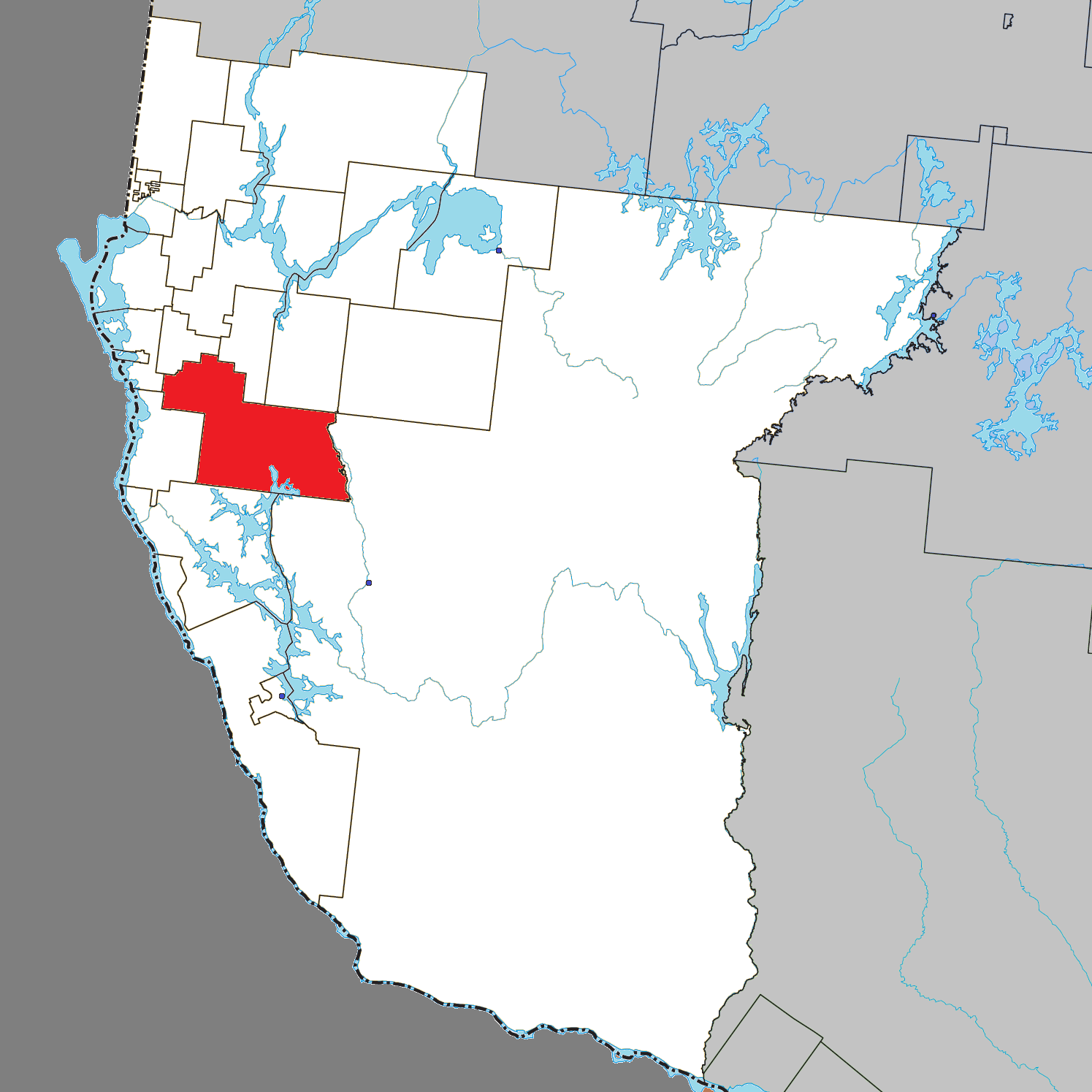
- Location within Témiscamingue RCM

- Location in western Quebec
- Coordinates: 47°17′N 79°20′W
- Country: Canada
- Province: Quebec
- Region: Abitibi-Témiscamingue
- RCM: Témiscamingue
- Settled: 1885
- Constituted: October 3, 1912

Government
  - Mayor: Luc Lalonde
  - Federal riding: Abitibi—Témiscamingue
  - Prov. riding: Rouyn-Noranda–Témiscamingue

Area
  - Total: 552.44 km^{2} (213.30 sq mi)
  - Land: 496.28 km^{2} (191.61 sq mi)

Population (2021)
  - Total: 708
  - Density: 1.4/km^{2} (3.6/sq mi)
  - Pop (2016–21): ▼1.7%
  - Dwellings: 386
- Time zone: UTC−5 (EST)
  - Summer (DST): UTC−4 (EDT)
- Postal code(s): J0Z 1G0
- Area code: 819
- Highways: R-391
- Website: www.bearn.ca

Béarn (French pronunciation: [beaʁn]) is a municipality in northwestern Quebec, Canada, in the Témiscamingue Regional County Municipality.

== History ==
Settlement of the area began at the end of the 19th century. It was first incorporated as the Parish Municipality of Saint-Placide in 1913, taking its name from the parish that was founded two years earlier.

In 1923, the railroad was built and the place began to be known as Béarn (in honor of the Béarn Regiment). Its post office opened in 1941. Because it was known as Béarn in common use, the name was changed in 1956 to Saint-Placide-de-Béarn, and in 1983, it changed status to municipality and the name was shortened to the current name.

== Demographics ==
In the 2021 Census of Population conducted by Statistics Canada, Béarn had a population of 708 living in 350 of its 386 total private dwellings, a change of −1.7% from its 2016 population of 720. With a land area of 496.28 km^{2} (191.61 sq mi), it had a population density of 1.4/km^{2} (3.7/sq mi) in 2021.

Canada census – Béarn, Quebec community profile

	2021	2016	2011
Population	708 (-1.7% from 2016)	690 (-11.9% from 2011)	775 (-12.2% from 2006)
Land area	496.28 km^{2} (191.61 sq mi)	501.79 km^{2} (193.74 sq mi)	501.46 km^{2} (193.61 sq mi)
Population density	1.4/km^{2} (3.6/sq mi)	1.4/km^{2} (3.6/sq mi)	1.5/km^{2} (3.9/sq mi)
Median age	46.4 (M: 44.4, F: 51.2)	46.2 (M: 43.4, F: 50.0)	45.0 (M: 43.6, F: 46.5)
Private dwellings	386 (total) 350 (occupied)	386 (total) 327 (occupied)	381 (total) 349 (occupied)
Median household income	$58,800	$54,720	$51,420

References: 2021 2016 2011

Historical census populations – Béarn, Quebec

Year	Pop.	±%
1921	471	—
1931	895	+90.0%
1941	918	+2.6%
1951	1,028	+12.0%
1956	1,063	+3.4%
1961	1,073	+0.9%

Year	Pop.	±%
1966	1,051	−2.1%
1971	885	−15.8%
1976	895	+1.1%
1981	1,050	+17.3%
1986	1,050	+0.0%
1991	1,014	−3.4%

Year	Pop.	±%
1996	973	−4.0%
2001	942	−3.2%
2006	883	−6.3%
2011	775	−12.2%
2016	720	−7.1%
2021	708	−1.7%

Population figures based on revised counts. Population counts are not adjusted for boundary changes.
Source: Statistics Canada

Mother tongue language (2021)

Language	Population	Pct (%)
French only	670	94.4%
English only	15	2.1%
Both English and French	5	0.7%
Other languages	15	2.1%

== Government ==
List of former mayors:

- Anthime Gaudet (1912–1914, 1919–1923, 1933–1937)
- Joseph Laliberté (1914–1915)
- Albert Laperrière (1915–1919, 1923–1924)
- Maurice Hurtibise (1924–1929)
- Alphonse Gaudet (1929–1931, 1937–1939)
- Joseph Bernard (1931–1933)
- Philippe Carpentier (1939–1943)
- Napoléon Chaumont (1943–1948)
- Gérard Beauregard (1948–1951)
- Donat Gaudet (1951–1953)
- Viateur Mathieu (1953–1955)
- Léonel Perreault (1956–1961)
- Sylvio Gaudet (1961–1963)
- Théodore Audet (1963–1964)
- Clément Beauregard (1964–1967)
- Eddy Bellehumeur (1967–1973)
- Gaston Carpentier (1973–1989)
- Claude Chaumont (1989–1997)
- Raynald Gaudet (1997–2005)
- Luc Lalonde (2005–present)

== See also ==
- List of municipalities in Quebec
