= Angliers, Quebec =

Angliers
- Former village municipality
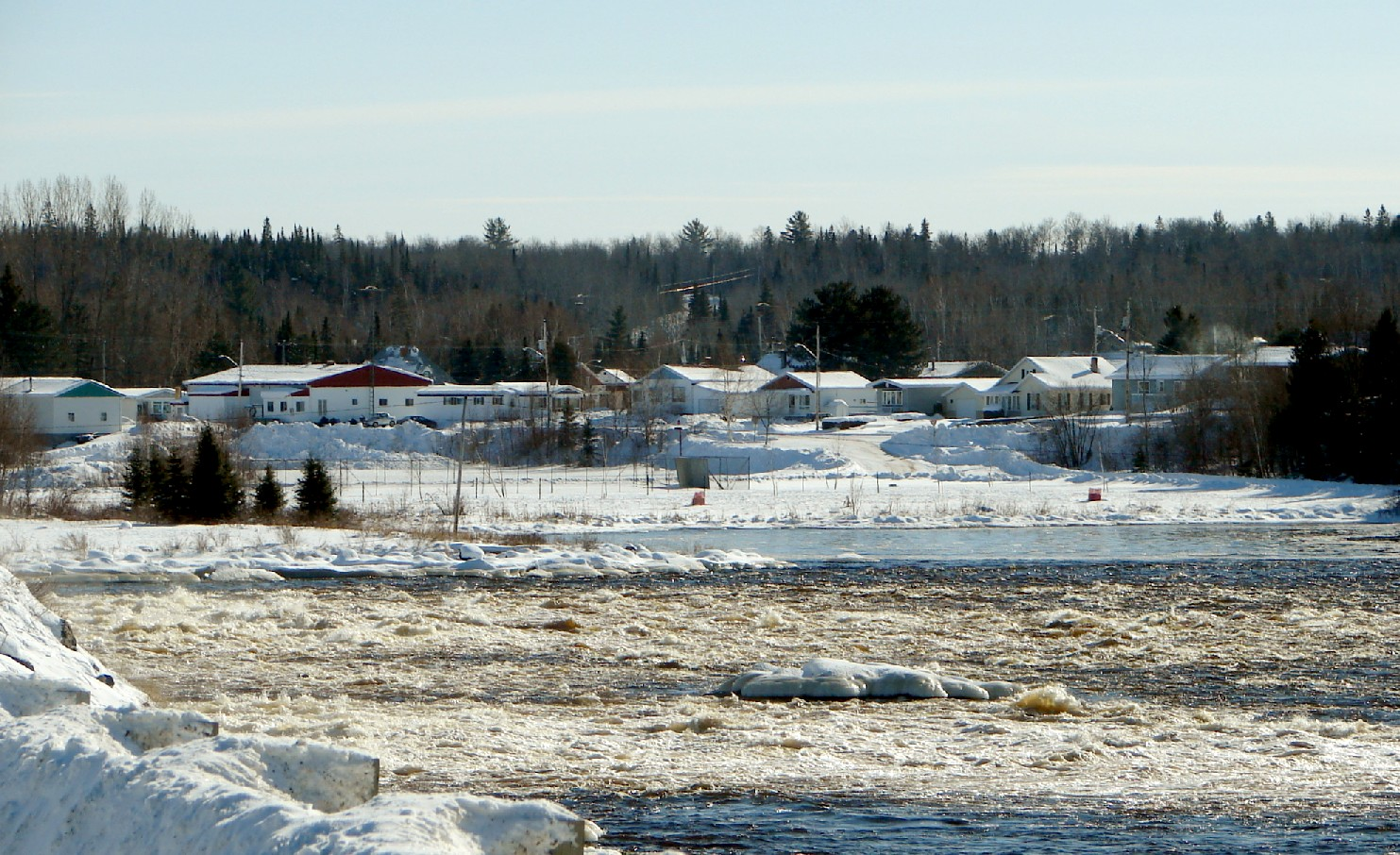
- Ottawa River at the outlet of Lac des Quinze, Angliers

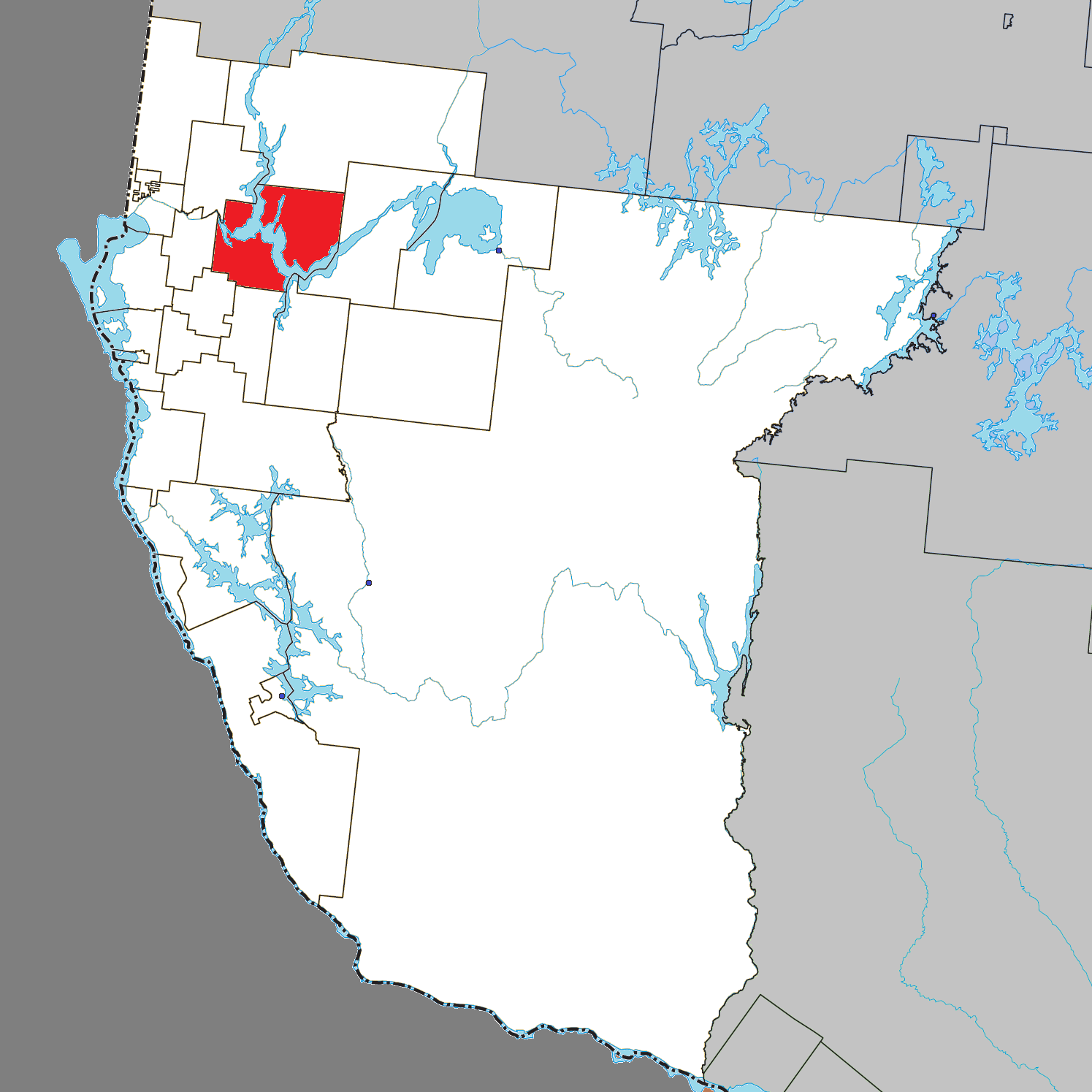
- Location within Témiscamingue RCM

- Location in western Quebec
- Coordinates: 47°32′54″N 79°14′22″W
- Country: Canada
- Province: Quebec
- Region: Abitibi-Témiscamingue
- RCM: Témiscamingue
- Municipality: Laverlochère-Angliers
- Settled: 1911
- Constituted: May 24, 1945
- Amalgamated: January 1, 2018
- Named after: Angliers, Vienne

Government
  - Mayor: Lyna Pine
  - Federal riding: Abitibi—Témiscamingue
  - Prov. riding: Rouyn-Noranda–Témiscamingue

Area
  - Total: 382.60 km^{2} (147.72 sq mi)
  - Land: 298.21 km^{2} (115.14 sq mi)

Population (2016)
  - Total: 303
  - Density: 1/km^{2} (2.6/sq mi)
  - Pop (2011–16): ▲1.7%
  - Dwellings: 218
- Time zone: UTC−05:00 (EST)
  - Summer (DST): UTC−04:00 (EDT)
- Postal code(s): J0Z 1A0
- Area code: 819
- Census profile: 2485080
- MAMROT info: 85080
- Toponymie info: 1464

Angliers (French pronunciation: [ɑ̃ɡlije]) is a former village municipality in northwestern Quebec, Canada, in the Témiscamingue Regional County Municipality. It is one of the two sectors in the municipality of Laverlochère-Angliers.

== History ==
The first settlers arrived in 1911, but the village developed from 1924 onwards, after the Pouvoir-des-Quinze hydro-electric power station was built in 1922. It was named after Angliers, Vienne, in France, the ancestral birthplace of Lomer Gouin, premier of Quebec from 1905 to 1920. The forestry industry and log driving contributed greatly to its development.

On May 24, 1945, it was incorporated as the Village Municipality of Angliers with its territory taken from the Township Municipality of Guérin and the Municipality of Saint-Eugène-de-Guigues.

It amalgamated with the Municipality of Laverlochère on January 1, 2018, to form the Municipality of Laverlochère-Angliers.

== Demographics ==
Canada census – Angliers, Quebec community profile

| | 2016 |
| Population | 303 (+1.7% from 2011) |
| Land area | 298.21 km^{2} (115.14 sq mi) |
| Population density | 1.0/km^{2} (2.6/sq mi) |
| Median age | 51.9 (M: 50.1, F: 53.7) |
| Private dwellings | 218 (total) 139 (occupied) |
| Median household income | $56,128 |

Notes: 2016 was the last census of Angliers as an incorporated municipality.
References: 2016

Historical census populations – Angliers, Quebec

| Year | Pop. | ±% |
|---|---|---|
| 1951 | 466 | — |
| 1956 | 442 | −5.2% |
| 1961 | 488 | +10.4% |
| 1966 | 511 | +4.7% |
| 1971 | 404 | −20.9% |
| 1976 | 309 | −23.5% |
| 1981 | 263 | −14.9% |

| Year | Pop. | ±% |
|---|---|---|
| 1986 | 345 | +31.2% |
| 1991 | 307 | −11.0% |
| 1996 | 306 | −0.3% |
| 2001 | 331 | +8.2% |
| 2006 | 308 | −6.9% |
| 2011 | 298 | −3.2% |
| 2016 | 303 | +1.7% |

Population figures based on revised counts. Population counts are not adjusted for boundary changes.
Source: Statistics Canada

Mother tongue (2016):

- English as first language: 6.7%
- French as first language: 93.3%
- English and French as first language: 0%
- Other as first language: 0%

== Local government ==
List of former mayors:

- Conrad Coulombe (1945–1947)
- J.P. Vachon (1947–1948)
- Alex Bérubé (1948–1953)
- Henri Falardeau (1953–1955)
- Georges Bellehumeur (May 1955–November 1955)
- Ubald Dusseault (1955–1957, 1959–1961)
- Léo Lanthier (1957–1959)
- Horace McDougal (1961–1963)
- Louis Beaulieu (1963–1965)
- Tony Peluso (1965–1967)
- Fernand Coulombe (1967–1971)
- Denis Arpin (1971–1983)
- Paul Coulombe (1983–2009)
- Lyna Pine (2009–2017)
