= André Garin =

André Garin (May 7, 1822 – February 16, 1895) was a Catholic priest, missionary, and oblate.

== Biography ==
Garin was born in La Côte-Saint-André, Isère, France. He received his education at the lesser seminary of his native town, and entered the Order of the Missionary Oblates of Mary Immaculate on November 1, 1842. As he was still too young to be admitted to the priesthood, he was sent to Canada, where he was ordained on April 25, 1845, by Bishop Bourget of Montreal.

Garin, who spoke both Montagnais and English, worked for twelve years in the Indian missions of Eastern Canada. In 1847 he succeeded Jean-Nicolas Laverlochère as missionary to James Bay, and completed Laverlochère's work on a catechism and prayerbook translated into Cree.

Afterwards he occupied the post of superior successively at Plattsburgh and at Buffalo, New York.

Later, Garin was sent to minister to the French Canadians in Lowell, Massachusetts, where he remained as pastor for twenty-five years. There he built a number of churches and schools, as well as establishing several religious confraternities. He died on February 16, 1895; two years later, the members of his parish built a statue in his honor.
