= Duhamel-Ouest =

- Municipality
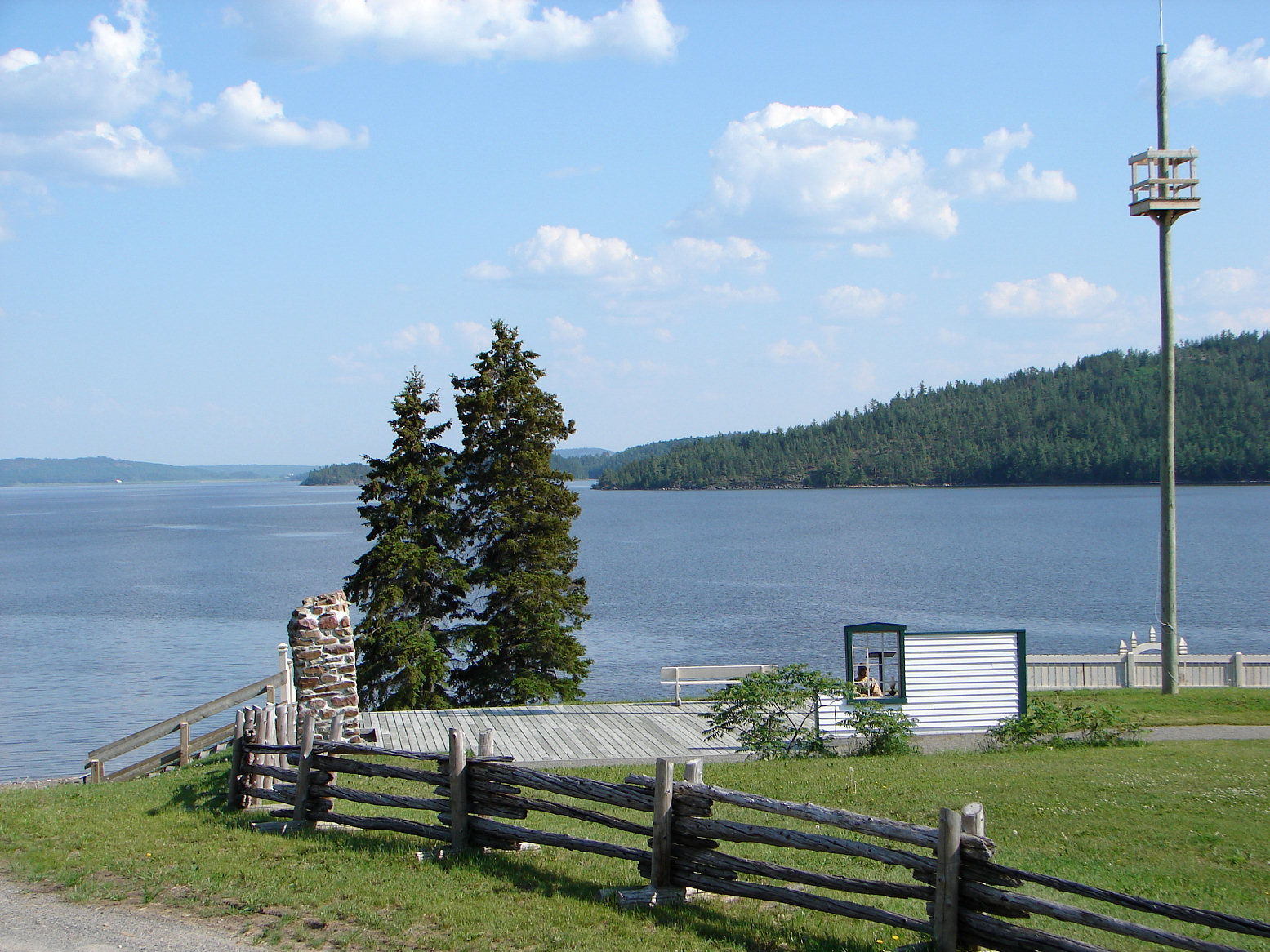
- Fort Temiscamingue

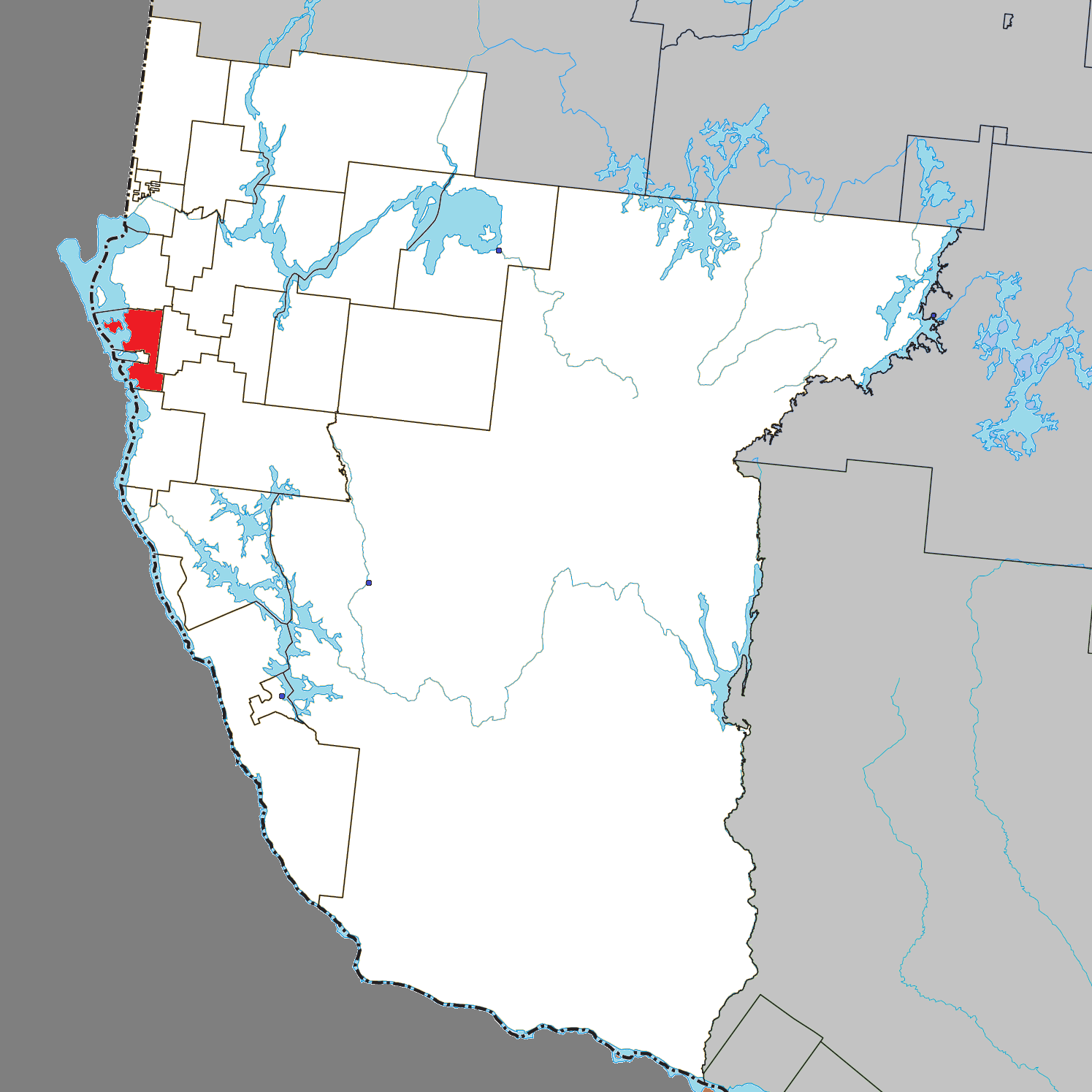
- Location within Témiscamingue RCM

- Location in western Quebec
- Coordinates: 47°22′N 79°26′W
- Country: Canada
- Province: Quebec
- Region: Abitibi-Témiscamingue
- RCM: Témiscamingue
- Settled: 1870s
- Constituted: February 20, 1911

Government
  - Mayor: Alain Sarrazin
  - Federal riding: Abitibi—Témiscamingue
  - Prov. riding: Rouyn-Noranda–Témiscamingue

Area
  - Total: 128.81 km^{2} (49.73 sq mi)
  - Land: 91.49 km^{2} (35.32 sq mi)

Population (2021)
  - Total: 945
  - Density: 10.3/km^{2} (27/sq mi)
  - Pop (2016–21): ▲7.6%
  - Dwellings: 470
- Time zone: UTC−5 (EST)
  - Summer (DST): UTC−4 (EDT)
- Postal code(s): J9V 1A2
- Area code: 819
- Highways: R-101 R-382
- Website: municipalites-du-quebec.ca/duhamel-ouest/index.php

Duhamel-Ouest (French pronunciation: [dyamɛl wɛst]) is a municipality in northwestern Quebec, Canada in the Témiscamingue Regional County Municipality.

Located at a narrows of Lake Timiskaming, Duhamel-Ouest is home to the Fort Témiscamingue, a National Historic Site of Canada.

== History ==
Originally inhabited by Algonquin people, the area began to see Coureurs des bois in the middle of the 17th century, travelling on the Ottawa River and Lake Timiskaming. In 1720, Fort Témiscamingue was founded by French merchants on the east side of the lake. In the middle of the 19th century, colonization started with the arrival of logging companies and Oblate missionaries.

In 1877, the geographic township of Duhamel was created, named after Joseph-Thomas Duhamel, and was incorporated as a township municipality in 1898. In 1911, the Township Municipality of Duhamel is dissolved, when it split up into the new municipalities of Notre-Dame-de-Lorrainville and Duhamel-Ouest. "Ouest" (French for "west") was added to distinguish it from Duhamel in the Outaouais Region.

== Demographics ==
Canada census – Duhamel-Ouest community profile

	2021	2016	2011
Population	945 (+7.6% from 2016)	878 (+6.0% from 2011)	828 (-4.8% from 2006)
Land area	91.49 km^{2} (35.32 sq mi)	91.47 km^{2} (35.32 sq mi)	91.78 km^{2} (35.44 sq mi)
Population density	10.3/km^{2} (27/sq mi)	9.6/km^{2} (25/sq mi)	9.0/km^{2} (23/sq mi)
Median age	49.6 (M: 50.0, F: 48.8)	48.6 (M: 49.2, F: 47.9)	44.9 (M: 46.2, F: 43.6)
Private dwellings	470 (total) 394 (occupied)	520 (total) 372 (occupied)	419 (total) 338 (occupied)
Median household income	$86,000	$75,008	$71,429

References: 2021 2016 2011

Historical census populations – Duhamel-Ouest

Year	Pop.	±%
1891	677	—
1901	241	−64.4%
1911	373	+54.8%
1921	583	+56.3%
1931	642	+10.1%
1941	515	−19.8%
1951	552	+7.2%

Year	Pop.	±%
1956	567	+2.7%
1961	547	−3.5%
1966	541	−1.1%
1971	475	−12.2%
1976	468	−1.5%
1981	546	+16.7%
1986	592	+8.4%

Year	Pop.	±%
1991	595	+0.5%
1996	671	+12.8%
2001	766	+14.2%
2006	870	+13.6%
2011	828	−4.8%
2016	878	+6.0%
2021	945	+7.6%

Population counts are not adjusted for boundary changes.
Source: Statistics Canada

Mother tongue (2021):

- English as first language: 1.6%
- French as first language: 95.8%
- English and French as first language: 1.1%
- Other as first language: 2.1%

== Local government ==
List of former mayors:

- Alcide Gaudet (...–2005)
- Alain Sarrazin (2005–2013, 2023–present)
- Jean-Yves Parent (2013–2017)
- Guy Abel (2017–2021)
- Jocelyn Cardinal (2021–2023)

== See also ==
- List of municipalities in Quebec
