= Fort Témiscamingue =

Trading post in the west of Quebec

Coordinates: 47°17′19″N 79°27′41″W

- Ville-Marie
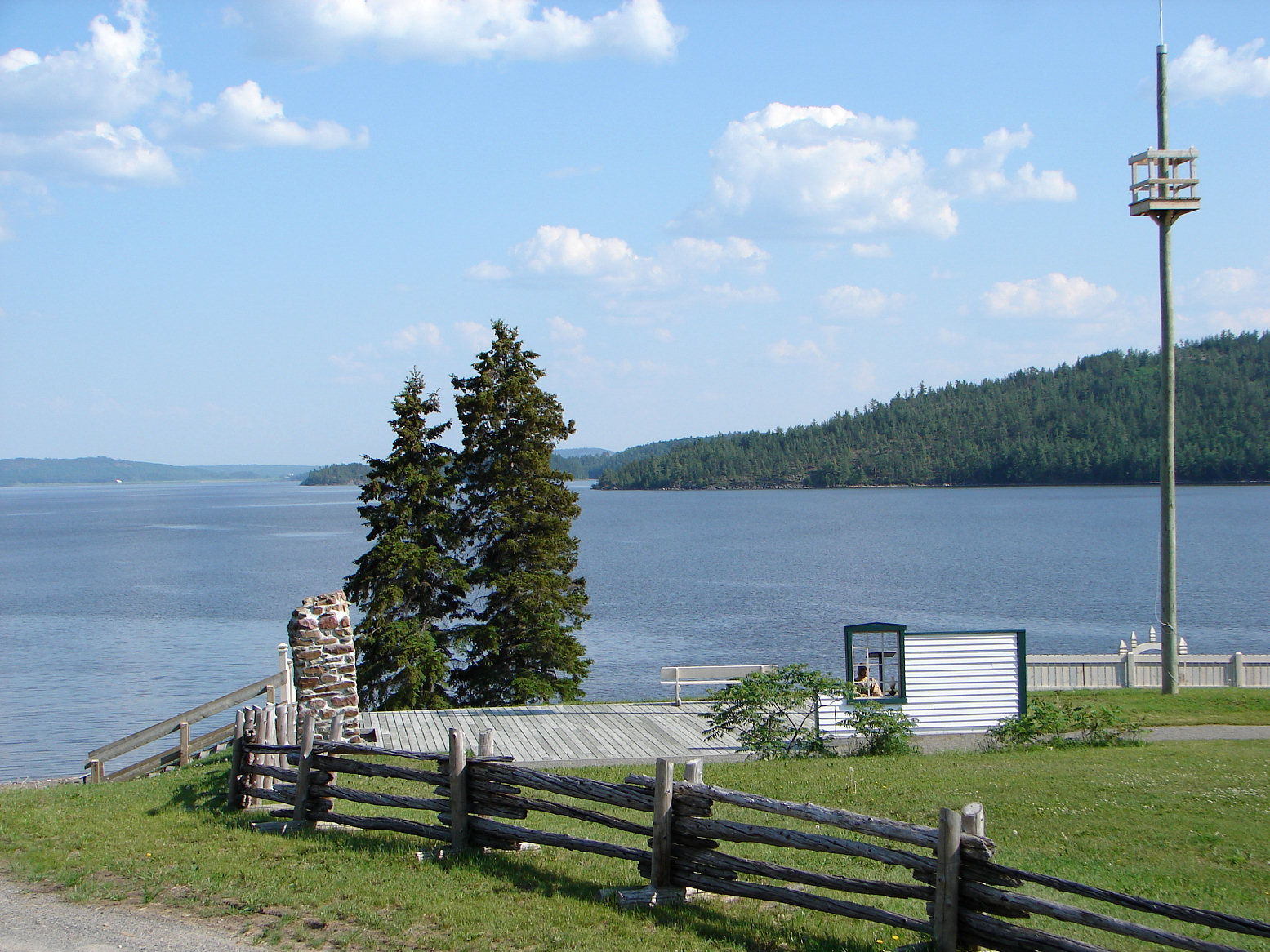
- Remnants of Fort Témiscamingue with Lake Timiskaming in the background.

Site information
- Type: Fort
- Controlled by: New France; Canada

National Historic Site of Canada
- Official name: Fort Témiscamingue National Historic Site of Canada
- Designated: 1931

Site history
- Built: 1679
- In use: 1679–1902

Fort Témiscamingue was a trading post from the 18th century in Duhamel-Ouest, Quebec, near Ville-Marie, Canada, located on the fur trade route on the east shore of Lake Timiskaming. The fort is a National Historic Site, operated as part of the national park system by Parks Canada, in partnership with the Timiskaming First Nation.

== History ==
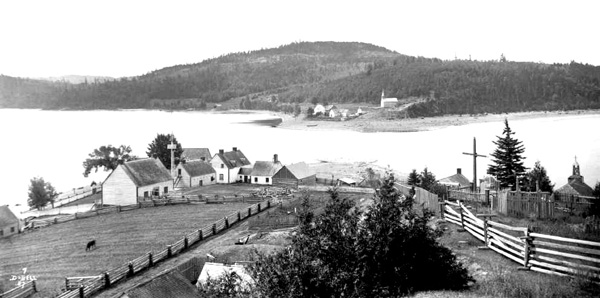
Fort Témiscamingue in 1887.

Since Lake Timiskaming is at the northwest "corner" of the Ottawa River where its course turns from west to southeast, the lake is a natural site for a trading post. It was on the main canoe route from Hudson Bay to the St. Lawrence River (James Bay, Moose Factory, Abitibi River, Lake Abitibi, portage, Lake Timiskaming, Ottawa River southeast to Montreal). The lake was about the midpoint of a 40-day journey. The Hudson Bay expedition (1686) was the first European group to use the route.

Circa 1679, Montreal merchants established a fort on the west side of Lake Timiskaming to compete with the English posts on the Hudson Bay, but it was destroyed by the Iroquois in 1688. In 1720, Fort Témiscamingue was founded by French merchants on the east side of The Narrows where the two shores of Lake Timiskaming come closer than 250 meters (820 ft) to each other, a former Algonquin encampment site called "Obadjiwan Point" (meaning "the strait where the current flows"). After the fall of New France the post was re-occupied by independent traders, the North West Company (1788) and the Hudson's Bay Company (1821). At the insistence of George Simpson it was supplied from Moose Factory rather than the more efficient Montreal. After 1863 it was again supplied from Montreal due to improvements in the transportation system. The arrival of lumbermen and later railroads and steamboats transformed the trading post into a general store. In 1887 the main store moved to Ville-Marie, Quebec. The fort lingered on until it was closed in 1902. Around 1980 there were only some standing chimneys, but today there is a historic site.

A Roman Catholic mission originally established at Fort Témiscaminguewas relocated to the western shore in 1863. The mission comprised a presbytery for the Oblate fathers, a small hospital operated by two Grey Sisters of the Cross, and a frame church.

== National historic site ==
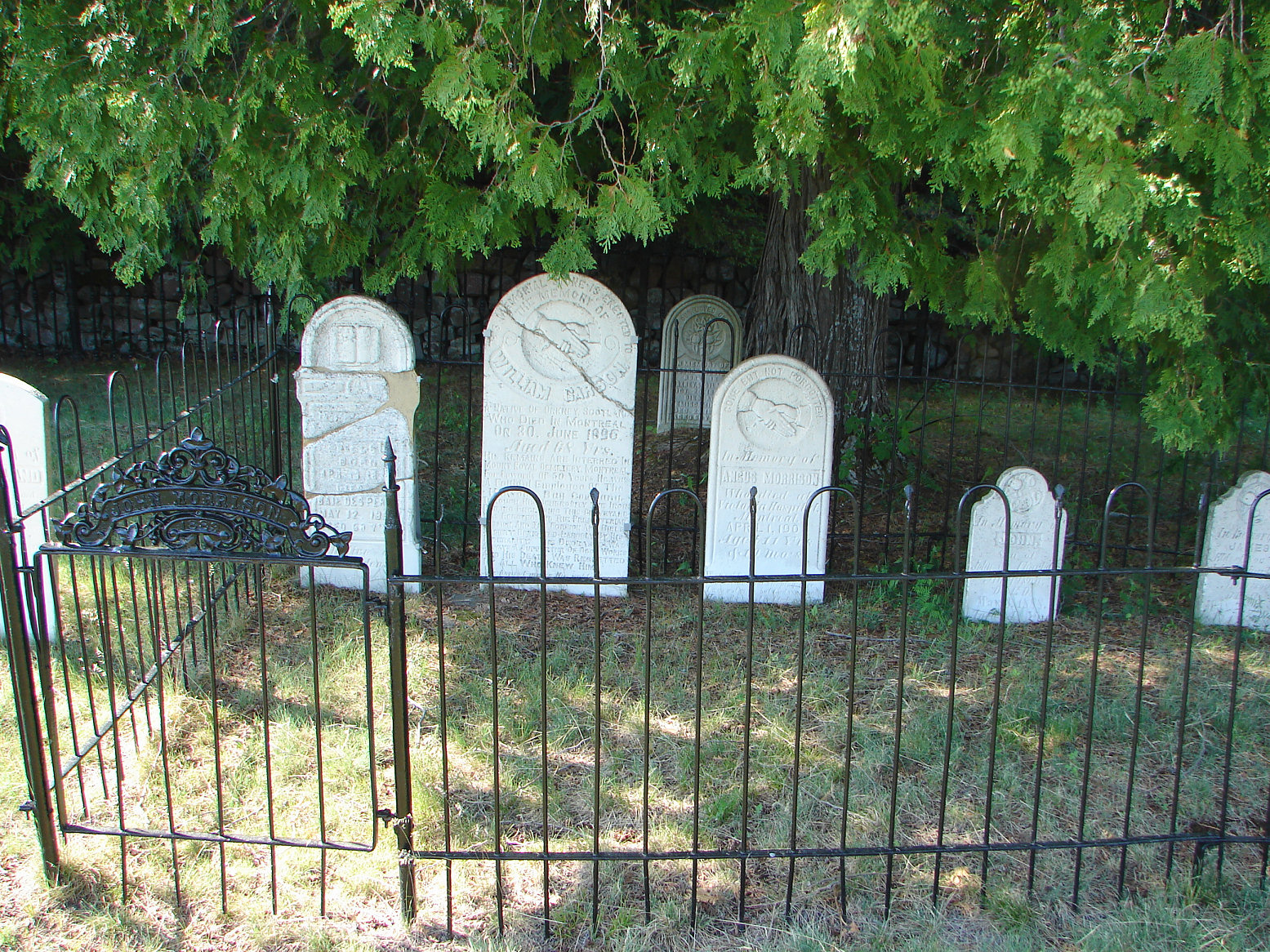
Old grave sites at Fort Témiscamingue.

Declared a national historic site in 1931, the site is notable for its cultural and natural heritage. The park's territory is mainly three distinct natural areas: the plateau, the escarpments and the lowlands. Overall, over 80% of the park is a wooded with approximately 20 different stands and numerous plants from the climatic forest type of the Laurentian maple stand and the Upper St. Lawrence forest sub-region. Of particular interest is a forest of cedar trunks so twisted that it was nicknamed the "Enchanted Forest".

Of the fort itself not much remained, but a modern visitor's centre, exhibits, and reenactments highlight the cultural history of the place.

== See also ==
- Ignace Tonené
