= Ville-Marie, Quebec =

Ville-Marie
- City
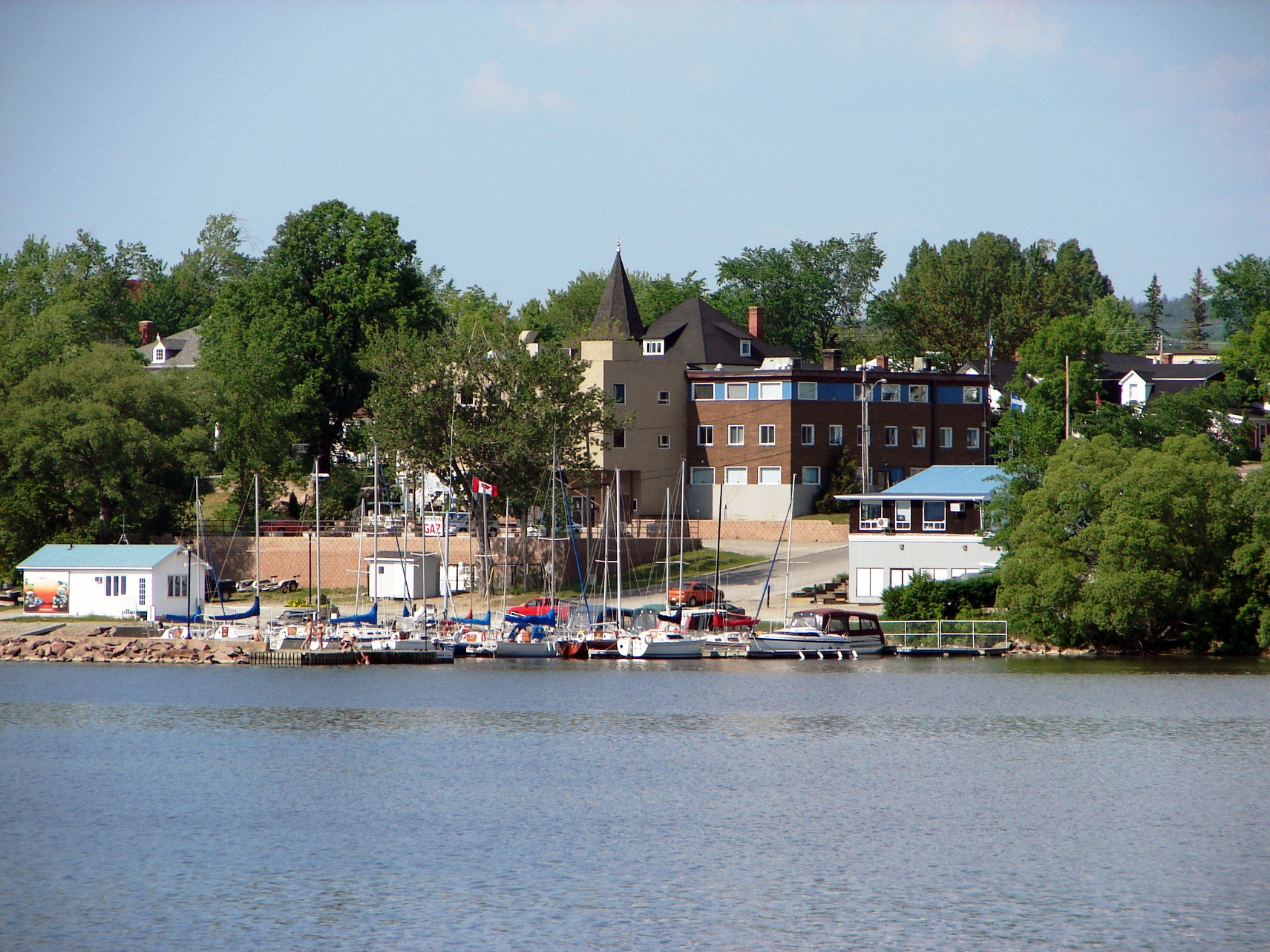
- Motto: "Berceau du Témiscamingue" (French for, "Cradle of Témiscamingue")
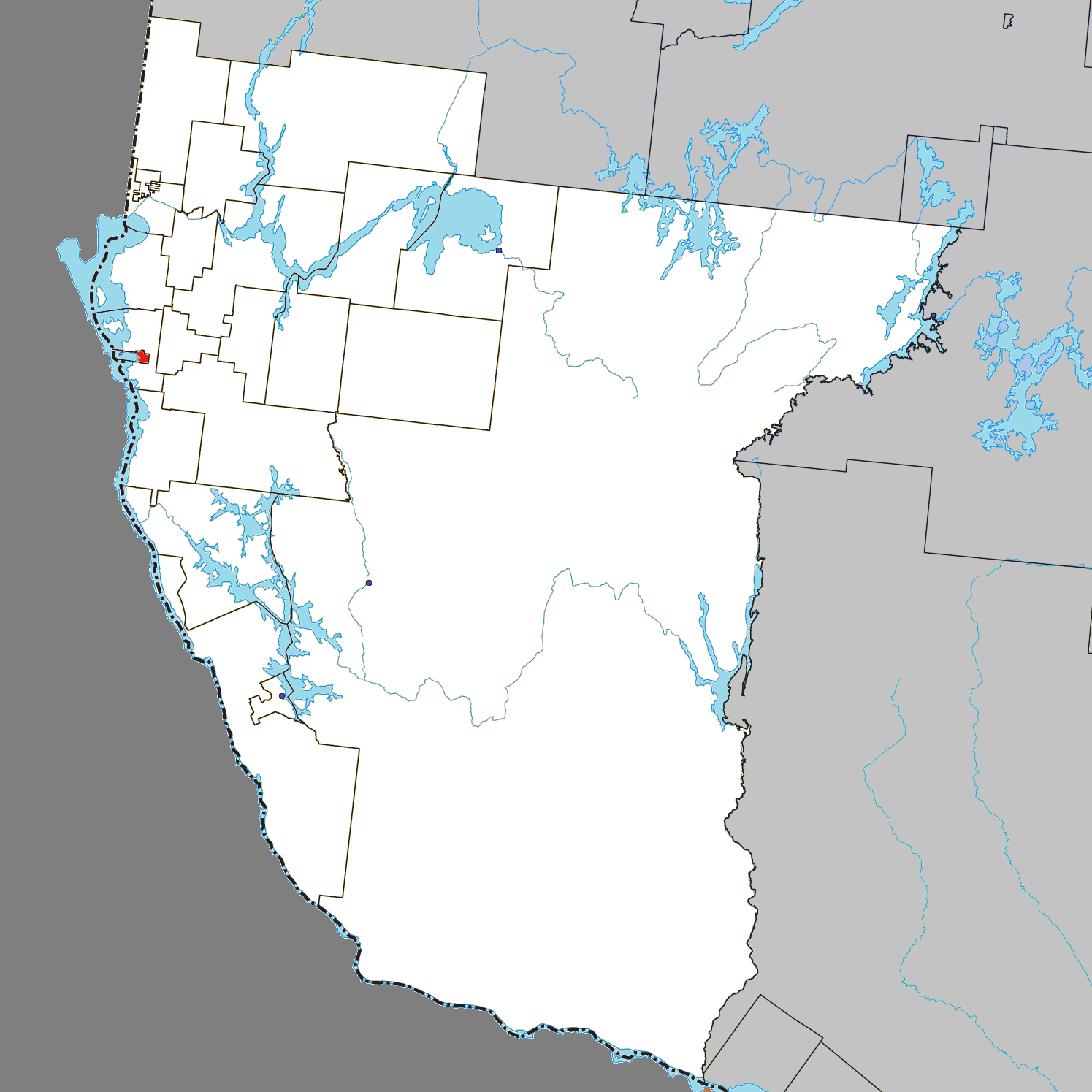
- Location within Témiscamingue RCM

- Location in western Quebec
- Coordinates: 47°20′N 79°26′W
- Country: Canada
- Province: Quebec
- Region: Abitibi-Témiscamingue
- RCM: Témiscamingue
- Settled: 1870s
- Constituted: October 13, 1897

Government
  - Mayor: Martin Lefebvre
  - Federal riding: Abitibi—Témiscamingue
  - Prov. riding: Rouyn-Noranda–Témiscamingue

Area
  - Total: 12.57 km^{2} (4.85 sq mi)
  - Land: 5.83 km^{2} (2.25 sq mi)

Population (2021)
  - Total: 2,464
  - Density: 422.4/km^{2} (1,094/sq mi)
  - Pop (2016–21): ▼4.6%
  - Dwellings: 1,264
- Time zone: UTC−05:00 (EST)
  - Summer (DST): UTC−04:00 (EDT)
- Postal code(s): J9V 1A1
- Area code: 819
- Website: https://www.villevillemarie.org

Ville-Marie (French pronunciation: [vil maʁi]) is a town on Lake Temiscaming in western Quebec, Canada. It is the largest city and seat of the Témiscamingue Regional County Municipality. As one of the oldest towns in the Abitibi-Témiscamingue region, it is considered the cradle of north-western Quebec and nicknamed "Pearl of Témiscamingue".

CKVM-FM broadcasts from Ville-Marie. The town is home to the Junior "A" Ville-Marie Pirates of the Greater Metro Junior A Hockey League.

== History ==
Already in 1679, the place functioned as a trading post between the French and indigenous Algonquians. In 1720, the North West Company opened a trading post, and in 1785 it built s storehouse, which came into the hands of the Hudson's Bay Company in 1821 when the two companies merged. In 1836, a mission was established, followed in 1863, by a mission founded by the Missionary Oblates of Mary Immaculate, who gave it the name "Ville-Marie".

Originally the area was called Kelly Bay in honour of its first settler, James Kelly, who lived as a hermit. In 1874, Oblate missionary Joseph Moffet (1852–1932) cleared some land and moved to Kelly Bay that came to be known as Baie-des-Pères (Bay of Fathers). In 1883, he was joined by a group of settlers from Nicolet. In 1886, the Parish of Notre-Dame-du-Saint-Rosaire-de-Ville-Marie was founded, and in 1891, the Baie-des-Père Post Office opened. The Village Municipality of Ville-Marie was incorporated in 1897 and the following year the post office was renamed to match the village's name. In 1899, the HBC post closed.

On December 22, 1962, the Village Municipality of Ville-Marie became the Town of Ville-Marie.

Ville-Marie is the seat of the judicial district of Témiscamingue.

== Geography ==
=== Climate ===
Ville-Marie presents a typical continental climate, with frigid winters alongside warm and humid summers. It benefits from the lake's influence in winter, when temperatures are significantly higher than in other towns further from the lake. It still holds the record for the hottest day in Quebec with a temperature of 40 °C or 104 °F on July 6, 1921.

Climate data for Ville-Marie, Quebec
Month	Jan	Feb	Mar	Apr	May	Jun	Jul	Aug	Sep	Oct	Nov	Dec	Year
Record high °C (°F)	11.7 (53.1)	12.0 (53.6)	22.2 (72.0)	30.6 (87.1)	35.6 (96.1)	37.8 (100.0)	40.0 (104.0)	36.7 (98.1)	33.3 (91.9)	28.9 (84.0)	23.3 (73.9)	16.0 (60.8)	40.0 (104.0)
Mean daily maximum °C (°F)	−8.9 (16.0)	−6.9 (19.6)	−0.4 (31.3)	8.6 (47.5)	17.2 (63.0)	22.0 (71.6)	24.5 (76.1)	23.0 (73.4)	17.2 (63.0)	10.2 (50.4)	1.8 (35.2)	−5.2 (22.6)	8.6 (47.5)
Daily mean °C (°F)	−15.2 (4.6)	−13.5 (7.7)	−6.5 (20.3)	2.6 (36.7)	10.4 (50.7)	15.5 (59.9)	18.2 (64.8)	17.0 (62.6)	11.9 (53.4)	5.7 (42.3)	−2.0 (28.4)	−10.5 (13.1)	2.8 (37.0)
Mean daily minimum °C (°F)	−21.4 (−6.5)	−20.1 (−4.2)	−12.6 (9.3)	−3.5 (25.7)	3.5 (38.3)	8.9 (48.0)	11.9 (53.4)	11.0 (51.8)	6.6 (43.9)	1.2 (34.2)	−5.8 (21.6)	−15.7 (3.7)	−3.0 (26.6)
Record low °C (°F)	−50.0 (−58.0)	−50.0 (−58.0)	−41.1 (−42.0)	−28.3 (−18.9)	−17.8 (0.0)	−4.4 (24.1)	−1.7 (28.9)	−2.2 (28.0)	−6.0 (21.2)	−15.0 (5.0)	−36.7 (−34.1)	−43.9 (−47.0)	−50.0 (−58.0)
Average precipitation mm (inches)	51.1 (2.01)	37.2 (1.46)	51.8 (2.04)	59.7 (2.35)	74.1 (2.92)	87.1 (3.43)	87.1 (3.43)	88.0 (3.46)	87.5 (3.44)	78.4 (3.09)	64.3 (2.53)	53.2 (2.09)	819.5 (32.26)
Average snowfall cm (inches)	41.2 (16.2)	33.1 (13.0)	33.1 (13.0)	13.0 (5.1)	0.2 (0.1)	0.1 (0.0)	0.0 (0.0)	0.0 (0.0)	0.1 (0.0)	3.5 (1.4)	27.1 (10.7)	43.2 (17.0)	194.6 (76.6)
Mean monthly sunshine hours	80.5	121.5	143.3	170.8	225.9	245.9	261.5	228.9	143.8	103.4	61.8	65.5	1,852.9

== Demographics ==
In the 2021 Census of Population conducted by Statistics Canada, Ville-Marie had a population of 2,464 living in 1,185 of its 1,264 total private dwellings, a change of −4.6% from its 2016 population of 2,584. With a land area of 5.83 km^{2} (2.25 sq mi), it had a population density of 422.6/km^{2} (1,094.6/sq mi) in 2021.

Population trend:

Historical census populations – Ville-Marie, Quebec

Year	Pop.	±%
1901	502	—
1911	850	+69.3%
1921	840	−1.2%
1931	1,049	+24.9%
1941	1,001	−4.6%
1951	1,316	+31.5%
1956	1,409	+7.1%

Year	Pop.	±%
1961	1,710	+21.4%
1966	1,962	+14.7%
1971	1,995	+1.7%
1976	2,300	+15.3%
1981	2,651	+15.3%
1986	2,621	−1.1%
1991	2,581	−1.5%

Year	Pop.	±%
1996	2,855	+10.6%
2001	2,770	−3.0%
2006	2,696	−2.7%
2011	2,595	−3.7%
2016	2,584	−0.4%
2021	2,464	−4.6%

Source: Statistics Canada

=== Languages ===
Mother tongue (2021):

- English as first language: 1.3%
- French as first language: 95.8%
- English and French as first language: 0.6%
- Other as first language: 1.7%

== Economy ==
The main components of the local economy are agriculture, forestry, hydro-electricity, outdoor tourism (hunting and sport fishing).

== Government ==
List of former mayors:

- Sylvain Trudel (...–2009)
- Bernard Flébus (2009–2017)
- Michel Roy (2017–2021)
- Martin Lefebvre (2021–present)

== See also ==
- List of towns in Quebec
- Brother Moffet house
