= Angliers, Vienne =

Angliers
- Commune
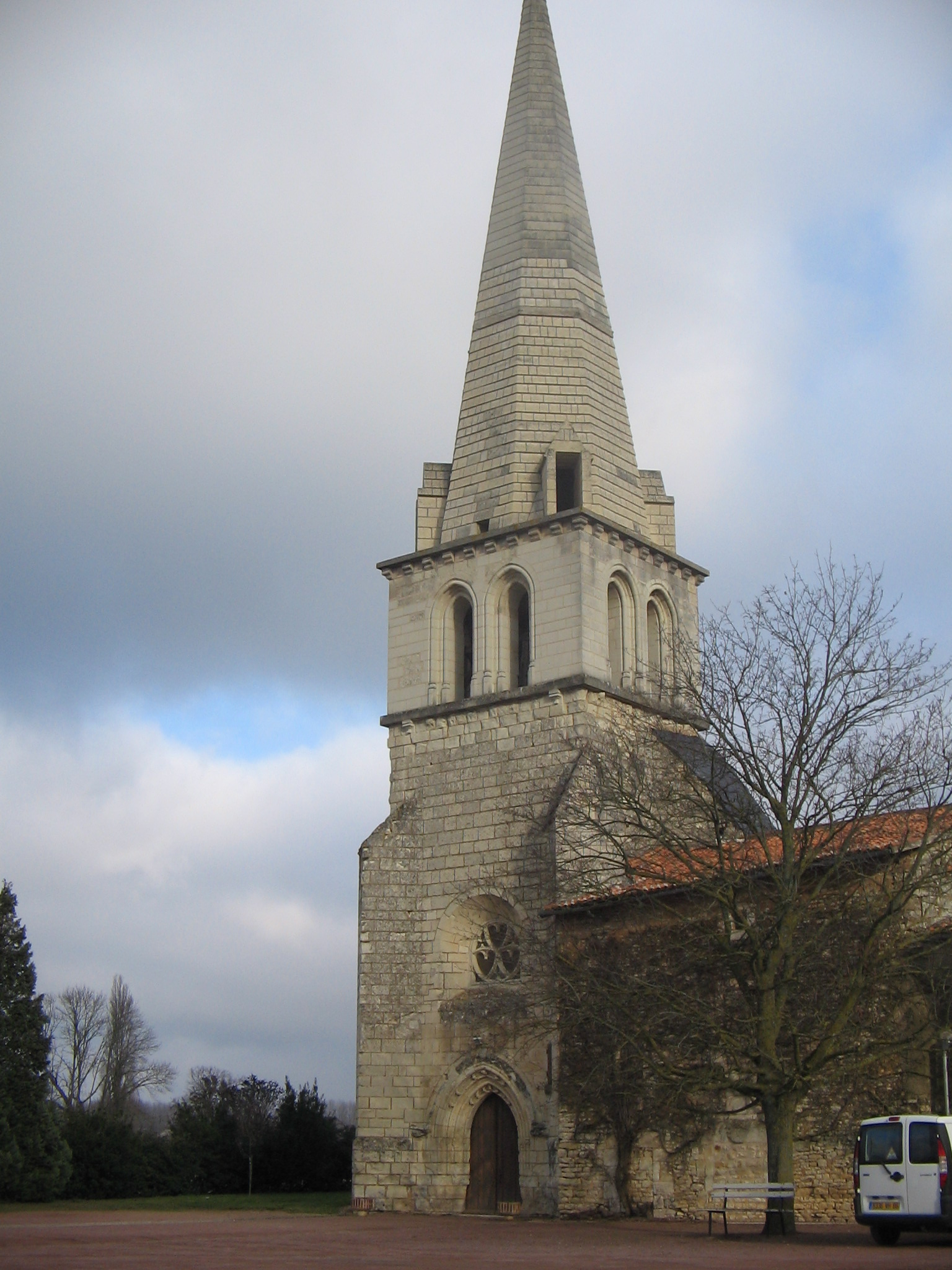
- The church in Angliers

- Coat of arms
- Location of Angliers
- Location within France Location within Nouvelle-Aquitaine
- Coordinates: 46°56′49″N 0°07′04″E
- Country: France
- Region: Nouvelle-Aquitaine
- Department: Vienne
- Arrondissement: Châtellerault
- Canton: Loudun
- Intercommunality: Pays Loudunais

Government
  - Mayor (2020–2026): Nathalie Bassereau
- Area^{1}: 23.31 km^{2} (9.00 sq mi)
- Elevation: 70 m (230 ft)
- Highest elevation: 83 m (272 ft)
- Lowest elevation: 54 m (177 ft)
- Population (2023): 612
  - Density: 26.3/km^{2} (68.0/sq mi)
- Time zone: UTC+01:00 (CET)
  - Summer (DST): UTC+02:00 (CEST)
- INSEE/Postal code: 86005 /86330
- ^{1} French Land Register data, which excludes lakes, ponds, glaciers > 1 km^{2} (0.386 sq mi or 247 acres) and river estuaries.

Angliers (French pronunciation: [ɑ̃ɡlije]) is a commune in the Vienne department in the Nouvelle-Aquitaine region in western France.

== See also ==
- Communes of the Vienne department
