= Fox (disambiguation) =

A fox is a medium-sized, omnivorous mammal of the family Canidae.

Fox may also refer to:

== Businesses ==
=== Automotive companies ===
- Fox (automobile company), 1921–1923
- Fox Factory, a racecar component manufacturer
- Fox Automotive Switzerland AG, who modified the Mia electric minivan

=== Entertainment and media companies ===
- 21st Century Fox, a former conglomerate whose Class B was traded as FOX from 2013 to 2019
- Fox Networks Group, a former subsidiary of The Walt Disney Company
  - Fox (international), a defunct brand of television channels
- Fox Film, a film studio
  - 20th Century Studios, formerly known as 20th Century Fox, which was formed in 1935 due to the merger of Fox Film with Twentieth Century Pictures
- Fox Feature Syndicate, a comicbook publisher (1930s–1950s)
- Fox Corporation, a media company controlled by Rupert Murdoch
  - Fox Broadcasting Company

=== Other businesses ===
- Fox (clothing), an Israel-based clothing company
- Fox Brothers, an English clothmaker
- Fox Racing, an apparel maker
- Fox Software, publisher of FoxPro

== Arts, entertainment and media ==
=== Fictional characters ===
- Fox (comics), one of two related superheroes (from 1940)
- Fox Crane, in the soap opera Passions (2002–2007)
- Fox McCloud, from the Star Fox video game series (1993–present)
- Fox Mulder, in The X-Files sci-fi TV series (1993–2018)
- Fox, in Disney animated series Gargoyles (1994–1997)
- Fox, a 2007 character in soap opera Neighbours
- Fox, on the Canadian comedy Son of a Critch
- The Fox, from The Hunter, a segment from the cartoon series King Leonardo and His Short Subjects (1960–1963)
- Yusuke Kitagawa (codename: Fox), from the 2016 Persona 5 video game
- Fox, from Skunk Fu!
- The Fox and the Cat, a pair of fictional characters from the Italian novel The Adventures of Pinocchio (1881–1883) by Carlo Collodi and several adaptations of the story in other media

=== Film and television ===
- Fox (TV series), a 1980 British TV drama
- Fox (film), a 2009 Hindi thriller
- The Fox (2025 film), Australian film directed by Dario Russo

=== Music ===
- The Fox (folk song), a nursery rhyme
- Fox (band), a British rock band of the 1970s
  - Fox (album), 1975
- Fox, an Australian rock band of the 1970s that recorded the album What the Hell Is Going On?
- "Fox" (song), by Millencolin, 2000
- The Fox (Elton John album), 1981

=== Radio stations ===
- Fox Radio (disambiguation), several uses
- Fox FM (Melbourne), in Australia
- Fox FM Ghana
- Heart Oxfordshire, formerly Fox FM, in England
- Port FM, formerly Fox FM, in New Zealand
- CFGW-FM, in Yorkton, Saskatchewan, Canada
- WBAF, in Barnesville, Georgia, US
- WBML, in Warner Robins, Georgia, US
- WFDR (AM), in Manchester, Georgia, US
- WQJJ-LP, in Jasper, Alabama, US

=== Other uses in arts, entertainment and media ===
- Fox (Marc), a 1911 painting by Franz Marc
- Fox games, a category of asymmetric board games for two players
- The Fox (magazine), an American arts magazine (1975–76)
- Fox, a pornographic magazine published by Magna Publishing Group
- Fox, a children's book by Margaret Wild

== Computing ==
- Fox toolkit, software for building graphical user interfaces
- IDEA NXT, formerly FOX, a block cipher

== People ==
=== Names ===
- Fox (given name), including a list of people with the name
- Fox (surname), including a list of people with the name

=== As a stage name or nickname ===
- Fox (gamer) (Ricardo Pacheco; born 1986), Portuguese professional game player
- "Fox Ryder", stage name of Sean Paul Lockhart (born 1986), American film actor and director
- Fox Stanton (1874–1946), American football player and coach
- Fox Stevenson (born 1993), stage name of English singer-songwriter Stanley Stevenson-Byrne (born 1993)

== Places ==
=== United States ===
- Fox, Alaska
- Fox, Arkansas
- Fox, Illinois
- Fox, Kentucky
- Fox, Minnesota
- Fox, Montana
- Fox, Ohio
- Fox, Oklahoma
- Fox, Oregon
- Fox, Virginia

=== Elsewhere ===
- Fox (crater), on the Moon
- Fox, South Australia

== Transportation and military ==
=== Land ===
- Audi 80, or Audi Fox, a compact executive car
- Volkswagen Fox, a subcompact car
- Volkswagen Gol, or VW Fox, a subcompact car
- Fox, a West Cornwall Railway steam locomotive
- NSU Fox, a light motorcycle
- Fox armoured reconnaissance vehicle, a British armoured car
- Fox Armoured Car, a Canadian wheeled armoured fighting vehicle
- M93 Fox, an armored personnel carrier

=== Sea ===
- Fox (boat), built in 1896 to be rowed across the Atlantic
- Fox (ship), an 1854 steam yacht
- Fox, the name of two Hudson's Bay Company vessels
- HMS Fox, several British ships and shore installations

=== Air ===
- Fox (code word), a brevity code for air-to-air munitions release
- Fairey Fox, a British light bomber and fighter biplane

== Other uses ==
- Formosan languages, spoken in Taiwan (ISO 639-5: fox)
- Fox (rabbit), a breed of rabbit
- FOX proteins, a family of transcription factors
- Meskwaki, a Native American people also known by the exonym "Fox"

== See also ==
- Fox's (disambiguation)
- Foxe (disambiguation)
- Foxes (disambiguation)
- Foxing, discoloration on old paper
- Foxx (disambiguation)
- Fuchs (disambiguation)
- Foxe Channel, Nunavut, Canada
- Fox Creek (disambiguation)
- Fox Crossing (disambiguation)
- Fox Glacier, a glacier and town in New Zealand
- Fox Islands (disambiguation)
- Fox Lake (disambiguation)
- Fox Movies (disambiguation)
- Fox River (disambiguation)
- Fox Theatre (disambiguation)
- Fox Valley (disambiguation)
- The Fox (disambiguation)
- Flying Fox (disambiguation)
