= Fox Creek =

Fox Creek may refer to:

== Places in Canada ==
- Fox Creek, Alberta, a town in Alberta
- Fox Creek Airport, in Alberta
- Fox Creek, New Brunswick, a community in Dieppe, New Brunswick

== Places in the United States ==
- Fox Creek, Colorado, an unincorporated community
- Fox Creek (Muckalee Creek tributary), a stream in Georgia
- Fox Creek (Bee Creek tributary), a stream in Missouri
- Fox Creek (Bryant Creek tributary), a stream in Missouri
- Fox Creek (Meramec River tributary), a stream in Missouri
- Fox Creek (Mississippi River tributary), a stream in Missouri
- Fox Creek (Sugar Creek tributary), a stream in Missouri
- Fox Creek (Catskill Creek tributary), a tributary of Catskill Creek in New York
- Fox Creek (Schoharie Creek tributary), a tributary of Schoharie Creek in New York
- Fox Creek Range, in Elko County, Nevada
- Fox Creek (South Dakota), a stream
- Fox Creek, Wisconsin, an unincorporated community

== See also ==
- Fox Crossing (disambiguation)
- Fox River (disambiguation)
