= Kipawa =

Kipawa may refer to:

== Canada ==
- Kipawa, Quebec, a village and municipality in western Quebec, Canada, in the Témiscamingue Regional County Municipality
- Lake Kipawa, a lake in far south-west Quebec, Canada
- Kipawa River, is a short river in western Quebec, Canada
- 2000 Kipawa earthquake, struck Quebec and Ontario, Canada in 2000
- Zec de Kipawa, a "zone d'exploitation contrôlée" located in the unorganized territory Les Lacs-du-Témiscamingue, in the Témiscamingue Regional County Municipality, in the administrative region of Abitibi-Témiscamingue, in Quebec, in Canada

== Other uses ==
- Kipawa, Ilala, an administrative ward in the Ilala District of the Dar es Salaam Region of Tanzania
