= Fox Island (disambiguation) =

Fox Island is an island in southeastern Michigan

Fox Island may also refer to:

== Canada ==
- Fox Islands (British Columbia), in that province's Central Coast region
- Fox Island, New Brunswick, an unincorporated community in Hardwicke Parish, Northumberland County, New Brunswick
- Fox Island, Hermitage Bay, Newfoundland and Labrador, a settlement
- Fox Island, South Coast, Newfoundland and Labrador, a settlement
- Fox Island Main, Nova Scotia
- Fox Island (Ontario), a small island in Lake Simcoe that forms the reserve of the Chippewas of Georgina Island First Nation
- Fox Island, Lake Kipawa, Quebec, uninhabited, located on the north end of Lake Kipawa near Kipawa, Quebec
- Fox Island, Gulf of Saint Lawrence, Quebec, uninhabited, located South of Harrington Harbour, Quebec in the Gulf of Saint Lawrence

== Falkland Islands ==
- Fox Island, Falkland Islands

== United States ==
- Fox Islands (Alaska), in the Aleutians
- Fox Island (Alaska), near Seward in Resurrection Bay
- The islands of North Haven and Vinalhaven in Penobscot Bay, Maine
- Fox Island (Waltham), Massachusetts, in the Charles River
- Fox Islands (Lake Michigan), in Michigan
- Fox Island (Thousand Islands), near Cape Vincent, New York, in Lake Ontario
- Fox Island (Rhode Island), in Narragansett Bay
- Great Fox Island, Virginia, in the Chesapeake Bay
- Fox Island, Washington, an island and census-designated place
