= The Fox =

The Fox may refer to:

== Film ==
- The Fox (1921 film), a silent Western starring Harry Carey
- The Fox (1967 film), a Canadian drama directed by Mark Rydell
- The Fox (2025 film), an Australian film starring Jai Courtney and Emily Browning, directed by Dario Russo

== Music ==
=== Albums ===
- The Fox (Elton John album), 1981
- The Fox (Harold Land album), 1960
- The Fox (Urbie Green album), 1976
- The Fox, a 1985 album by José Fors
- The Fox, soundtrack album by Lalo Schifrin, 1968

=== Songs ===
- "The Fox", an art song by Peter Warlock to a poem by Bruce Blunt, 1930
- "The Fox" (folk song), a 15th-century folk song popular in modern roots music
- "The Fox", a song from Steeleye Span's 1989 album Tempted and Tried
- "The Fox", a song from Sleater-Kinney's 2005 album The Woods
- "The Fox (What Does the Fox Say?)", a 2013 song and viral video made by the Norwegian duo Ylvis

== People ==
- Eric Carr (1950–1991), American musician
- Eddie "Lockjaw" Davis (1922–1986), American jazz saxophonist
- Malcolm Fairley (1952–2024), British criminal
- Sakae Oba (1914–1992), Japanese holdout on the island of Saipan, surrendered in December 1945
- David Pearson (racing driver) (1934—2018), American NASCAR racing driver, nicknamed The Fox
- James F. Phillips (1930–2001), American environmental activist and schoolteacher
- Fred Snowden (1936–1994), American collegiate basketball coach

== Publications ==
=== Novels ===
- The Fox (Forsyth novel), a 2018 novel by Frederick Forsyth
- The Fox (novella), a 1922 novella by D. H. Lawrence
- The Fox (Smith novel), a 2007 novel by Sherwood Smith

=== Others ===
- The Fox, a 1906 book by Thomas Francis Dale
- T.H.E. Fox, an online comic of the 1980s and 1990s by Joe Ekaitis
- The Fox (comics), the name of two superheroes that appear in periodicals published by MLJ Comics and later Dark Circle Comics
- The Fox (magazine), a 1970s conceptual art magazine
- Volpone, a 1606 play by Ben Jonson, subtitled The Fox

== Pubs ==
- The Fox Goes Free, pub in Charlton, West Sussex, England, formerly The Fox
- The Fox Inn, Hanwell, pub in London, England
- The Fox, York, pub in Yorkshire, England

== Other uses ==
- The Fox, a fictional character in American TV series King Leonardo and His Short Subjects (1960–1963)
- The Fox, nickname for Aiden Pearce, a fictional character in the Watch Dogs TV series
- The Fox: NGV Contemporary, a new art gallery, part of the National Gallery of Victoria in Melbourne, Australia

== See also ==
- Fox (disambiguation)
