= Fox Studios (disambiguation) =

Fox Studios may refer to one of several related companies:

- Fox Film, the movie studio from 1915 to 1935
- 20th Century Fox, formed from the merger of Fox Film and 20th Century Pictures
- Fox Studios Australia, the former name of Disney Studios Australia, an Australian film and television studio owned by Disney

== See also ==
- Fox Movies (disambiguation)
