= Laniel =

Laniel may refer to:

== Places ==
- Laniel, Quebec, an unorganized territory in Quebec, Canada

== People with the surname ==
- Gérald Laniel (1924–2016), Canadian politician
- Joseph Laniel (1889–1975), French politician
- Marc Laniel (born 1968), Canadian ice hockey player
