= Foxes (disambiguation) =

Foxes are dog-like omnivorous mammals.

Foxes or The Foxes may also refer to:

== Arts and entertainment ==
- Foxes (film), a 1980 American teen drama
- The Foxes (Marc), a 1913 painting by Franz Marc
- The Foxes, a 1961 television pilot with Joan Crawford

=== Music ===
- Foxes (soundtrack), the soundtrack of the teen film
- Foxes (singer) (born 1989), British singer-songwriter
- The Foxes (band), a London-based indie rock group formed in 2006

== Sports ==
- Leicester City F.C., an English professional football club nicknamed The Foxes
- Marist Red Foxes, the athletic teams of Marist College, New York

== See also ==
- The Foxes of Firstdark or Hunter's Moon, a 1989 novel by English fantasy author Garry Kilworth
- The Fox (disambiguation)
- Fox (disambiguation)
