= Fox Creek Township, Harrison County, Missouri =

Township in Harrison County, Missouri, U.S.

Fox Creek Township
- Township
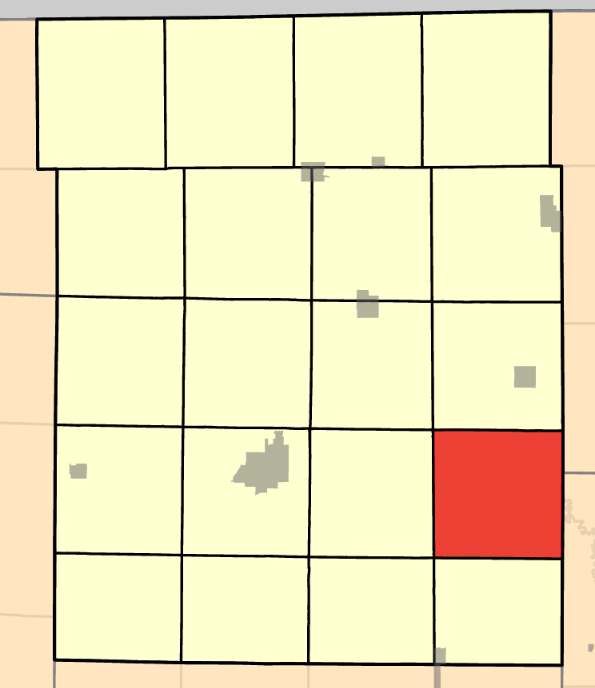
- Coordinates: 40°14′32″N 93°49′40″W
- Country: United States
- State: Missouri
- County: Harrison

Area
  - Total: 36.65 sq mi (94.9 km^{2})
  - Land: 36.5 sq mi (95 km^{2})
  - Water: 0.15 sq mi (0.39 km^{2}) 0.41%
- Elevation: 925 ft (282 m)

Population (2020)
  - Total: 111
  - Density: 3/sq mi (1.2/km^{2})
- FIPS code: 29-08125455
- GNIS feature ID: 766720

Fox Creek Township is a township in Harrison County, Missouri, United States. At the 2020 census, its population was 111.

Fox Creek Township was created due to a county-wide November 1872 election, which would subdivide the county into 20 municipal townships corresponding with the county's 20 congressional townships. It takes its name from Fox Creek.
