= Zec de Kipawa =

- Location within Quebec
- Location: Canada, Quebec, Les Lacs-du-Témiscamingue
- Nearest city: Béarn
- Coordinates: 47°06′00″N 78°30′00″W
- Area: 2,397 km^{2} (925 sq mi)
- Established: 1989
- Governing body: Association faunique Kipawa inc

The ZEC Kipawa is a "zone d'exploitation contrôlée" (controlled harvesting zone), located in the unorganized territory of Les Lacs-du-Témiscamingue, within the Témiscamingue Regional County Municipality, in the administrative region of Abitibi-Témiscamingue, Quebec, Canada. Outdoor activities on the ZEC are particularly popular from May to October, including camping, mountain biking, hunting, fishing, and hiking along forest trails. The ZEC's mission includes the protection of flora and fauna.

== Geography ==
Located in the heart of the Témiscamingue Regional County Municipality, ZEC Kipawa is the largest zone d'exploitation contrôlée (controlled harvesting zone) in Quebec, covering an area of 2,397 square kilometres. This controlled harvesting area features 750 lakes, many of which are used for recreational fishing.

ZEC Kipawa is connected on its east side to the La Vérendrye Wildlife Reserve and on its south side to ZEC Restigo. The main mountains of ZEC Kipawa are located near Lake Kikwissi: Mont Wakwik (331 m), Mount du Trappeur (360 m), and Rene Mountain (405 m).

Major lakes within the ZEC include Ostaboningue, Kikwissi, Saseginaga, McLachlin, Ogascaname, Lac des Loups (Wolf Lake), Lac des Foins (Hay Lake), Algonquin, and Lescot.

The main rivers flowing through the ZEC are the Kipawa River, Du Pin Blanc (White Pine) River, Aux Écorces (Bark) River, Brazeau Stream, and Seirs Creek.

The main access roads to the ZEC include several secondary roads and trails for mountain biking. Many wilderness areas within the ZEC are accessible to visitors and offer scenic views.

The entrance station of ZEC Kipawa opens on Victoria Day (in May) and closes around the end of the moose hunting season with rifles (in October). Users can access ZEC Kipawa through Val-d'Or (via Baie Carrière Road), Temiscaming (via Route 819), and Belleterre or Béarn (via Route 814).

The main reception station, installed in 2014, is located just outside the town of Béarn, where the administrative offices of the ZEC are situated.

== Toponymy ==
The name of the ZEC is shared with the municipality, post office, bay, dam, railway, roads, channel, lake, river, and forest bearing the same name.

The designation "Kipawa" originally referred to the territory of the Lake Kipawa watershed in the Témiscamingue Regional County Municipality. Over time, several other names in the area were derived from this original name. A post office was established in 1878, and a train station was noted in 1916 by James White under the English names "Kipawa Station" and "Kipawa Junction."

Since 1985, the term "Kipawa" has also referred to a municipality near Temiscaming, located to its northeast. Initially inhabited by the Algonquin people, this locality was established on the shores of Lake Kipawa near Gordon Creek, facing English Bay. In the Algonquin language, "Kipawa" means "it is closed."

According to Oblate missionary Joseph-Étienne Guinard, Lake Kipawa "because of its long bays, looks like a spider from the air. It is easy to get lost on its waters; we mistake the bays for rivers, proceed, and find ourselves blocked. It’s closed! Kipawa!"

This area, now a controlled harvesting zone (ZEC) covering over 4,600 square kilometres, is located a short distance from the Kebaowek Indian Reserve.

The residents of this town are referred to in French as "Kipawais" and in Algonquin as "Kipawawini," meaning "people of the closed lake."

The territory of the ZEC was once traversed by the Algonquin people of Témiscamingue. As a result, several lake names evoke their presence, including Ostaboningue, Saseginaga, Ogascanane, Kikwissi, and Wolves.

The name "ZEC Kipawa" was formalized on 6 September 1989 by the Geographical Names Board of Quebec (Commission de toponymie du Québec).

== Hunting and Fishing ==
The territory is home to various wildlife, including moose, black bear, grouse, and hare, which are available for hunting. There are restrictions on hunting, such as limits on species, hunting seasons, types of weapons, and the sex of animals (e.g., moose).

The main fish species found in the lakes and rivers are pike, walleye (doré), brook trout, and lake trout. The ZEC has nine lakes available for ice fishing in winter: Lac du Club (Lake Club), Lake Diamond, Lac des Îles (Lake of Islands), Lake Line, McNorton Lake, Little Moose Lake, Lake Sheen, and Lake Wabacouche.

In addition to fishing and hunting, outdoor enthusiasts can enjoy several activities, including five canoe-camping circuits suitable for beginner adventurers. The ZEC also offers users several campgrounds, as well as rustic, semi-furnished (wild) accommodations.

The territory of the ZEC is served by seven providers offering services such as accommodation, boats, and motors. Various activities are available, including canoe camping, with canoes and kayaks available for rent. The Kipawa-TeeLake footpath spans two kilometres, starting at the entrance station of ZEC Kipawa, located at kilometre 35 on the access road (forest road) from Béarn.

== Circuits of canoe camping ==
The main canoe camping circuits offered by ZEC Kipawa are:

Circuit Des Raiders:

This 190 km loop with 11 portages combines the calm waters of the historic Tuk Tuk TUK route with the flowing waters of the Kipawa River. From the Algonquin history at Hunter's Point to the graves of the loggers who lost their lives in the rapids of the Kipawa River, the route offers a rich historical experience. Access to the circuit is via Béarn, and it provides access to a section of the Kipawa River. The circuit can be segmented at the Hunter starting point. Completing the route takes 12 to 14 days.

Circuit Cigarette:

This loop is named after the shape of a lake along the route. It offers a wide variety of lakes, swamps, springs, and beaches to explore. Ogascanane Lake provides numerous opportunities to swim and enjoy its white sandy beaches with an exotic allure. The journey along the "Cigarette route" includes several attractions within a short distance. This 31 km route has four portages and typically takes 3 to 4 days to complete. The Aboriginal variant of the name is Micikikanick Sakalkan. The circuit includes Lacs des Loups, Ogascanane, Jumeaux (Twin), Cigarette, and Long.

Circuit Tuk Tuk:

The majority of the history of the Kipawa area is concentrated along this 96 km loop. This route offers numerous sites of cultural heritage, and its diverse landscapes and many marshes provide excellent opportunities to observe wildlife, as most of the trail is in an isolated environment. Completing the circuit takes 4 to 10 days and includes twelve portages. The Aboriginal variant of the name is Sagegawega. The reference lake for the circuit is Saseginaga.

The trail includes Ostaboningue Lake, Ostaboningue River, Hunter's Point Lake, Audoin River, Lac du Bouleau (Birch Lake), Lake Pommeroy, Lake Eau Claire, Lakes Saseginaga, Écarté, North, BL, and Rivière Cerise (Cherry River). Access is through Béarn, and there are sufficient campsites along the route.

Circuit Brousse:

Length: 58 km (in loop). (loop). This circuit includes a dozen challenging portages, including one over a beaver dam to connect the lakes and rivers further along. From the fjord around Lac des Six Îles (Lake Six Islands) to the winding banks of the Cherry River, the scenery alone provides a memorable experience. The duration of the tour is 4 to 5 days.

The Aboriginal variant of the name is Kanikotwasotipalkanek Sakalkan. The reference lake for the circuit is Six Miles.

The trail includes Lake Ostaboningue, Cooks Bay, Lakes Cooks, Robert, Six Miles, Six Islands, Sasseginaga, and a return via the Cherry River. There are rapids and falls along the way. Access to the route is via Béarn. There is also an option to ascend the Cherry River and complete the circuit in the opposite direction, with the ride still taking 4 to 5 days.

Circuit Scale:

This 98 km circuit, with eight portages, takes you through areas with historical ties to colonization and deforestation, following an old railway along the portage to Lake Pommeroy. The route follows part of the historic Tuk Tuk route before heading to more remote lakes in the Témiscamingue hinterland. There are waterfalls between Lakes Pants and L'Échelle (Scale). The trip takes 7 to 8 days.

== See also ==
- Les Lacs-du-Témiscamingue, unorganized territory
- Témiscamingue Regional County Municipality (RCM)
- Abitibi-Témiscamingue, administrative region of Quebec
- Zone d'exploitation contrôlée (Controlled Harvesting Zone) (ZEC)
