= Fox FM Ghana =

Fox FM
- Kumasi, Ghana; Ghana
- Frequency: 97.9 MHz

Programming
- Language: English
- Format: internet radio, local news, sports, music, and podcasts. Stream live CNN

Ownership
- Owner: Francis Kwabena Poku
- Sister stations: Hot FM (Ghana)

Links
- Website: https://foxfmonline

Fox FM is a privately owned radio station in Kumasi, Ghana. Fox FM his is a multilingual radio station that broadcasts from Garden City, Oseikrom, Ghana, and can be listened both on 97.9 FM and online. The station is owned by Fracis Poku. Fox FM got awarded as one of Watchman Dog during the 2016 Election in Ghana.

== Notable personalities ==
- DJ Premier (Ghana)
- Stephen Tetteh
