= Fox Radio =

Fox Radio may refer to:

- Fox News Radio, an American radio network programmed by Fox News Channel
- Fox Sports Radio, an international radio network, a service of Premiere Radio Networks
- Fox News Talk, a satellite radio channel
- A collection of radio stations owned by Craig Fox (radio host)

== See also ==
- Fox FM (disambiguation)
