= Fox Island (Lake Kipawa, Quebec) =

Uninhabited island in Lake Kipawa, Quebec

Native name: Île Fox
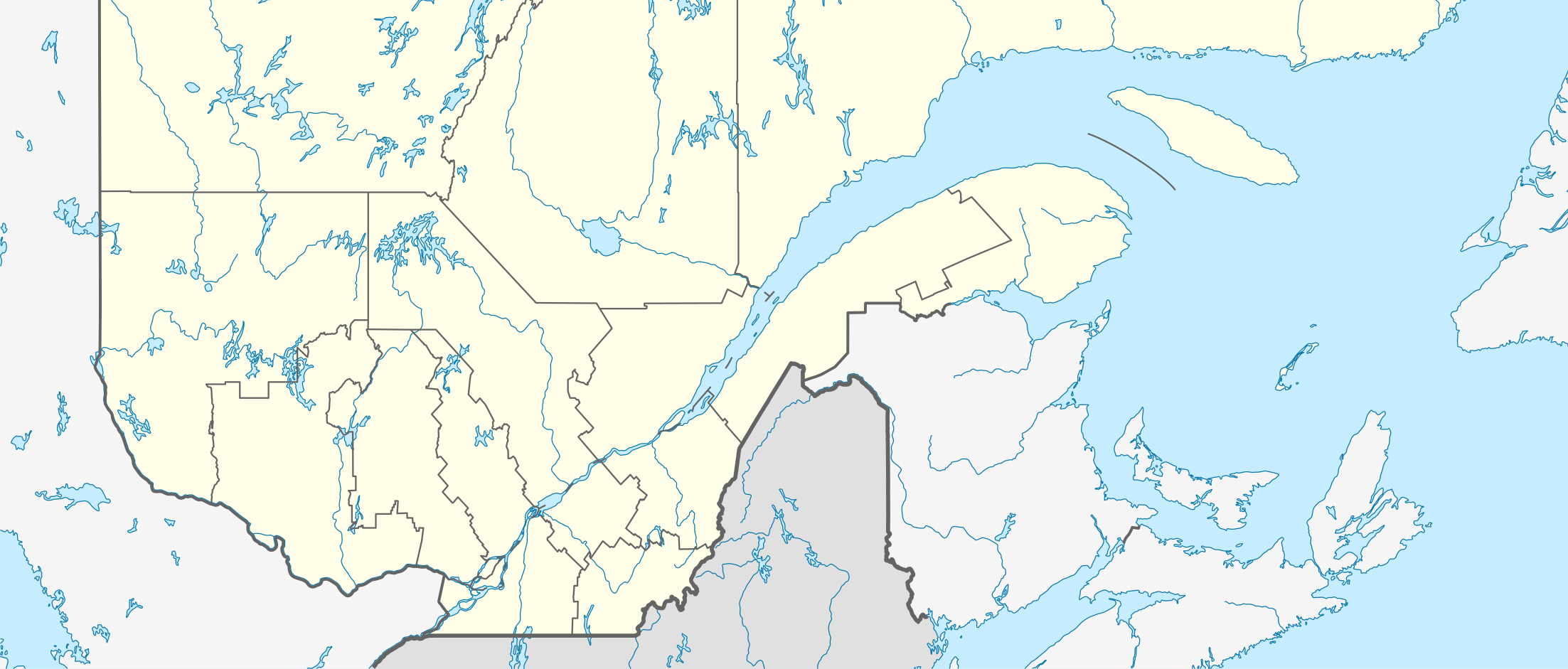
- Location within Western Quebec Location within Quebec South Location within Quebec Location within Canada

Geography
- Location: Lake Kipawa
- Coordinates: 46°58′27.6″N 79°01′23.8″W

Administration
- Canada
- Province: Quebec

Demographics
- Population: 0 (2019)

Fox Island (French: Île Fox) is an uninhabited island in Lake Kipawa, Quebec. The island lies to the west of Île au Chevreuil and has some accommodation facilities.
