= Hot FM (Ghana) =

Accra; Ghana
- Broadcast area: Greater Accra Region
- Frequency: 93.9 MHz

Programming
- Language: English
- Format: news, entertainment, sports, music.

Ownership
- Owner: Francis Kwabena Poku; (F. P. Communications Limited)
- Sister stations: Fox FM Ghana

Links
- Website: www.hotfmghana.com

Hot FM is a privately owned radio station in Accra, Ghana. Hot FM broadcasts both on 93.9 FM and online. The station is owned by Francis Poku.
