= Fox River =

Fox River is the name of:

== Populated places ==
=== Canada ===
- Fox River, Nova Scotia

=== Panama ===
- Folks River, Panama, a city and river in Colón Province, Panama, formerly called Fox River

=== United States ===
- Fox River, Alaska
- Fox River Township, Davis County, Iowa
- Fox River, Wisconsin, an unincorporated community
- Fox River Grove, Illinois, a village

== Rivers ==
=== Canada ===
- Fox River (Manitoba), a tributary of the Hayes River
- Ontario
  - Fox River (Cochrane District)
  - Fox River (Kenora District)
  - Fox River (Thunder Bay District)

=== New Zealand ===
- Fox River (Buller), in the Paparoa National Park, Buller District
- Fox River (Westland), a tributary of the Cook River, Westland District

=== United States ===
- Fox River (Fish River tributary), Seward Peninsula, Alaska
- Fox River (Alaska), Kenai Peninsula
- Fox River (Illinois River tributary), runs from Wisconsin into Illinois
- Fox River (Little Wabash tributary), in Illinois
- Fox River (Wabash tributary) in Illinois that is a tributary of the Wabash River near New Harmony, Indiana
- Fox River (Michigan), a river in the Upper Peninsula
- Fox River (Mississippi River), in Iowa and Missouri
- Fox River (Green Bay tributary), flows into Green Bay

== In fiction ==
- Fox River State Penitentiary, a fictional prison in Illinois in the TV show Prison Break

== See also ==
- Fox Creek (disambiguation)
- Fox Crossing (disambiguation)
