= Fox (given name) =

Given name

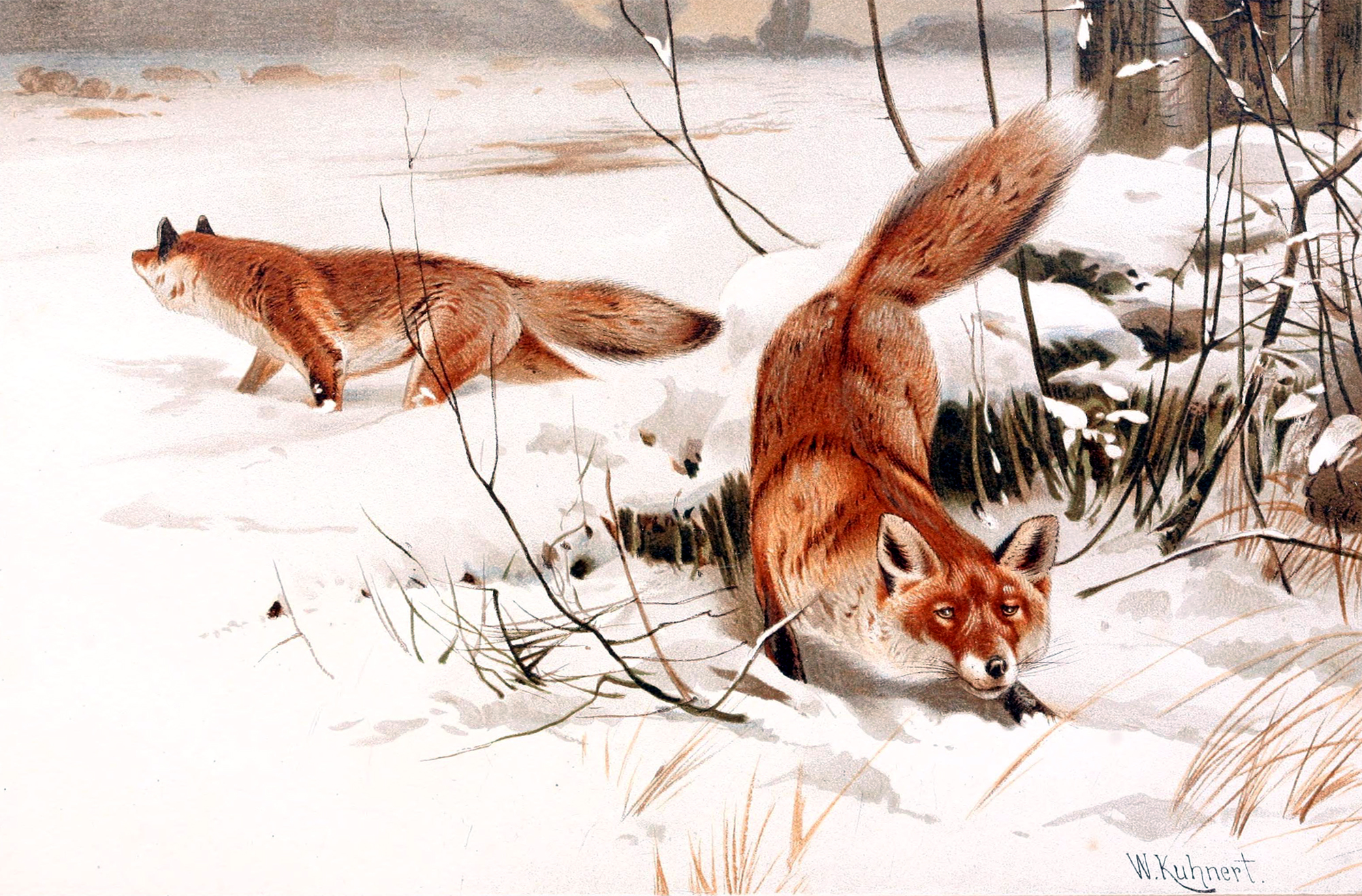
- Common Foxes in the Snow, by Wilhelm Kuhnert, 1893.
- Gender: Unisex, primarily masculine
- Language: English

Origin
- Meaning: “Fox”

Fox is a unisex, primarily masculine, given name, a transferred use of the English surname meaning “fox.” In some instances, it might have been used as a given name in honor of George Fox (1624–1691), the founder of the Quaker movement. The X-Files character Fox Mulder has drawn more attention to the name in recent years.

== Men ==
- Fox Butterfield (born 1939), American journalist
- Fox Conner (1874 – 1951), American Army major general
- Fox Fisher (born 1980), Indian-British artist, film maker, author and transgender rights campaigner
- Fox Harris (1936–1988), American actor
- Fox Henderson (1853–1918), American businessman and banking entrepreneur
- Fox Maule-Ramsay, 11th Earl of Dalhousie (1801 – 1874), British politician
- W. Fox McKeithen (1946–2005), American politician

== Nicknames ==
- William “Fox” Stanton (1874–1946), American football player and coach

== Stage name ==
- Fox Stevenson, stage name of English singer-songwriter Stanley Stevenson-Byrne (born 1993)

== Fictional characters ==
- Fox (comics), one of two related superheroes (from 1940)
- Fox Crane, in the soap opera Passions (2002–2007)
- Fox McCloud, from the Star Fox video game series (1993–2017)
- Fox Mulder, a character from the American television and movie series The X-Files
- Fox, in Disney animated series Gargoyles (1994–1997)
- Fox, a 2007 character in soap opera Neighbours
- Fox, on the Canadian comedy Son of a Critch
- The Fox, from The Hunter, a segment from the cartoon series King Leonardo and His Short Subjects (1960–1963)
- Yusuke Kitagawa (codename: Fox), from the 2016 Persona 5 video game
- Fox, a character from Skunk Fu!
