= Fox Island, Gulf of Saint Lawrence, Quebec =

Island in the Gulf of Saint Lawrence

Fox Island
Native name: Île Fox
- Location within Côte-Nord region, Quebec Location within Quebec Location within Canada

Geography
- Location: Gulf of Saint Lawrence
- Coordinates: 50°28′51.7″N 59°28′35.0″W

Administration
- Canada
- Province: Quebec

Demographics
- Population: 0 (2019)

Fox Island (French: Île Fox) is an uninhabited island in the Gulf of Saint Lawrence, Quebec. The island lies to the South of Harrington Harbour on Harrington Island.
