= Fox Movies =

Fox Movies may refer to:

- 20th Century Studios, an American film studio formerly known as 20th Century Fox
- Fox Movie Channel, former name of FX Movie Channel, an American television channel that airs movies
- Fox Film Corporation, a defunct movie studio
- Fox Action Movies, an Asian television channel that airs action and horror movies
- Fox Family Movies, an Asian television channel that airs family-friendly blockbuster movies
- Fox Movies (TV channel), a set of international movie channels by Fox Networks Group
  - Fox Movies (Southeast Asian TV channel), a channel airing blockbuster movies regardless of genre

== See also ==
- Fox (disambiguation)
- FX (disambiguation)
