= DJ Premier (radio DJ) =

Ghanaian radio DJ (born 1986)

Bismark Boachie (DJ Premier)
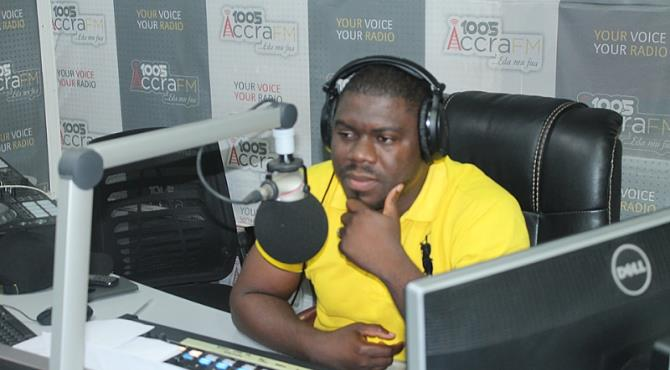
- Dj Premier at Accra Fm in 2017
- Born: Bismark Boachie; May 18, 1986 (age 39); Ashanti Region, Ghana
- Career
- Show: focus FM afterdrive mid-morning show drive time on fox FM mid-morning show Accra FM drive on Accra FM; Entertainment capital on Accra FM metro fm weekend smash show and Lunch time
- Station(s): Focus FM; Fox FM; Metro FM; Accra fm

Bismark Boachie popularly known as DJ Premier (born May 18, 1986) is a Ghanaian disc jockey and radio personality who works at Accra fm, an Accra base radio station and also a board member of the Ghana DJ Awards.

== Early years ==
A native of Ashanti Region, Bismark started his career as a mobile DJ where he played at parties and funerals events. In the early 2000s he was introduced into radio by Nathaniel osei kuffour aka Mahony formerly of focus FM and Kfm who now with Kapital radio felt he was wasting his talent playing as a mobile DJ and convince him to go into radio. In 2004, he landed his first job as a midnight DJ at focus fm. later he became an after-drive presenter and also a mid-morning presenter at Focus FM before leaving them in 2007 to join Fox FM where he was the host of Fox FM mid-morning Show and also the producer of Fox FM drive time. It did not take long for the talented DJ to be noticed by Metro FM another top radio station in kumasi the capital of the Ashanti region and he was given the right to host the Metro FM weekend smash show and lunch time. In October 2015, DJ Premier granted an interview with www.nydjlive.com where he confirmed that he was leaving Metro to join Accra base radio station Accra FM. he is also a board member of the Ghana DJ Awards. In 2018, he was made the head of entertainment at Accra Fm and its sister station Class FM.

== Interviews ==
Through his career as a radio host, Bismark have been fortunate to interview some of the big names in the music industries from around Africa on his show entertainment capital on Accra FM. Personalities such as UT Bank CEO Prince Kofi Amoabeng, Actress Maame Serwaa, Famous Ga rapper Gasmilla, Music producer and sound engineer Appiah Dankwa, aka Appietus, KiDi and many more. In an interview with razzonline.com in January 2017, he stated that he will only retire from radio after interviewing media personalities Kwame Sefa Kayi and Kofi Kum Bilson.
