= Fox Island (Waltham) =

Island in Waltham, Massachusetts, United States

- Location within Massachusetts

Geography
- Location: Charles River
- Coordinates: 42.3590875°N 71.2521084°W

Administration
- United States
- State: Massachusetts
- Municipality: Waltham

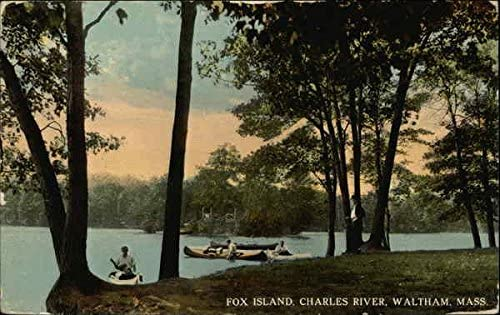
A postcard with art depicting a view of Fox Island

Fox Island is a minor island located in the Charles River in Waltham, Massachusetts. The island is public, uninhabited, and forested. It is owned by the Department of Conservation and Recreation (DCR). Fox Island's name is in conjunction with Fox Park in Waltham, which is just to the west by north of Fox Island, and also owned by the DCR. Fox Island was previously partially owned by Stephen B. Cram circa 1865. In 1891, Harvey Bartlett opened Forest Grove and Fox Island, a getaway that featured a swimming area, bathing houses, a carousel, a dance hall, a refreshment stand, and a bridge from Forest Grove to Fox Island. Bartlett's business was hurt by the opening of nearby Norumbega Park in 1897, but Fox Island remained an attraction for courting couples and daring swimmers.
