= Fox's =

Fox's may refer to:

- Fox's Biscuits, a bakery company in the United Kingdom
- Fox's Confectionery, a confectioner in the United Kingdom
  - Fox's Glacier Mints
- Fox's Pizza Den, a pizza restaurant chain
