= Foxe (disambiguation) =

Foxe is a surname.

Foxe may also refer to:

- Foxe Channel, an area of sea in Nunavut, Canada
- Foxe Basin, in Hudson Bay, Nunavut, Canada
- Foxe Peninsula, in Nunavut, Canada
- Fans of X-Rated Entertainment (FOXE), an American pornography fan organization

== See also ==
- Foxe's Book of Martyrs
