= Fox Crossing =

Fox Crossing may refer to:

== Places ==
- Fox Crossing, Wisconsin, a village, United States

== See also ==
- Fox Creek (disambiguation)
- Fox River (disambiguation)
