= Kipawa River =

Kipawa River Rivière Kipawa
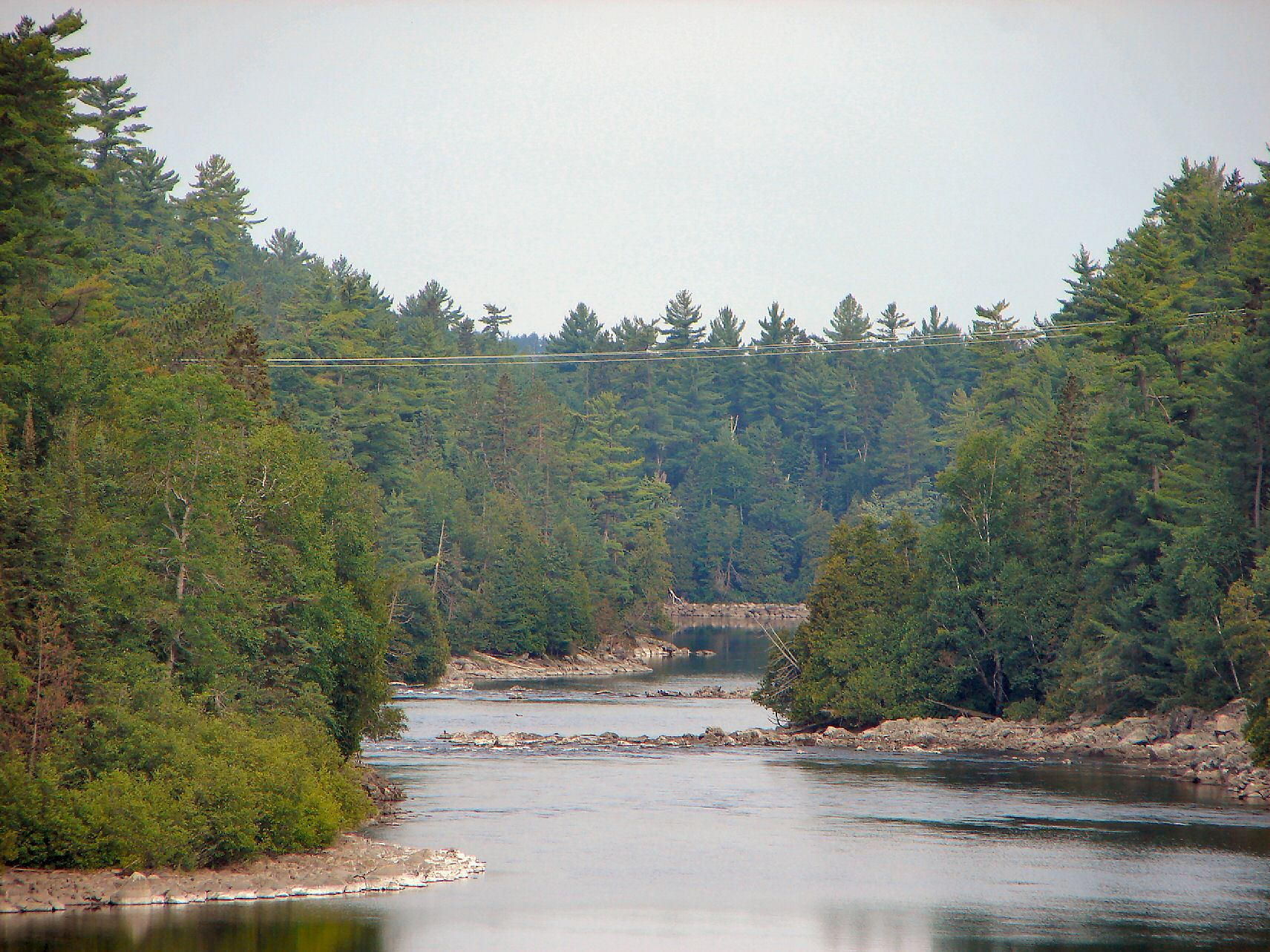
- Kipawa River during low water level, as seen from the Laniel Dam
- Etymology: Anishnabe word "Kebaouek" meaning "at the narrows beyond which more water opens out"

Location
- Country: Canada
- Province: Quebec
- Region: Abitibi-Témiscamingue

Physical characteristics
- Source: Upper/Lac Dumoine Lower/Lake Kipawa
  - coordinates: 46°57′43″N 78°01′27″W
  - elevation: 318 m (1,043 ft)
- Mouth: Ottawa River
  - location: Lake Timiskaming
  - coordinates: 47°03′00″N 79°23′14″W
  - elevation: 180 m (590 ft)
- Length: 180 km (110 mi)

Basin features
- Progression: Ottawa River→ St. Lawrence River→ Gulf of St. Lawrence
- River system: Ottawa River drainage basin

The Kipawa River (in French: Rivière Kipawa) is a short river in western Quebec, Canada. It is mostly an undeveloped river but the larger lakes have dams, fishing camps, and cottages on their shores. The communities of Kipawa and Laniel are located on Lake Kipawa. Also much logging takes place within its watershed basin, which is consequently crisscrossed by many bush roads. Route 101 crosses the river at Laniel.

The Kipawa River drops 90 metres (295 ft) over the last 16 kilometres (10 mi) from Lake Kipawa to its mouth which results in many whitewater rapids, making it popular with kayakers and canoeists. Since 1986, the Kipawa River Rally has been held annually over this stretch of the river.

Its name is derived from the Anishnabe word "Kebaouek" meaning "at the narrows beyond which more water opens out".

== Significant lakes ==
(in downstream order)

- Grassy Lake (Lac aux Foins)
- Watson Lake
- Wolf Lake (Lac des Loups)
- Lac Sairs
- Grindstone Lake
- Hunter Lake
- Lake Kipawa

== Significant tributaries ==
- Audoin River
- Rivière des Lacs

== History ==
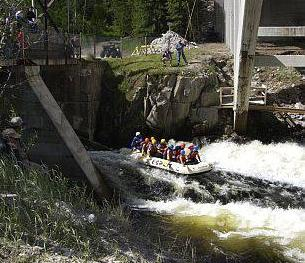
Laniel Dam prior to refurbishment

The first reference to the river comes from a Catholic priest who in the early 19th century used it to travel upstream to build a mission on Lake Kipawa for Algonquin Native Americans. In 1910, the Laniel Dam at the outflow of Lake Kipawa was built and has a sluice designed to float logs from Lake Kipawa to the Ottawa River.

The first recorded whitewater run on the Kipawa was in 1971 when Jose Mediavilla and Joseph Jacob from Rouyn-Noranda, Quebec, paddled downstream using an open canoe. Mediavilla continued to run it over the years, and by 1976 he was using the river for the practice portion of his whitewater certification courses, sanctioned by the provincial whitewater organization.

The Kipawa River has been the site of the Kipawa River Rally since 1985. The dates have more or less coincided with the St. Jean-Baptiste Holiday in Quebec. It is the second longest running recreational paddling festival in northeastern North America.

In 2007, the Laniel Dam required rebuilding to withstand the 1 in 1000 year flood event. The existing berm was unstable and leaked. But navigation rights through the dam gates were denied from then on. Les Amis de la rivière Kipawa (Friends of the Kipawa River) mounted a Judicial Challenge, arguing that navigation of the sluice is legal, safe, and significant under the Navigable Waters Protection Act. They were overruled by the Federal Court and Federal Appeals Court. Les Amis was subsequently levied with $5,000 in court costs as a result of their challenge thereby putting a damper on other river preservationists hoping to challenge administrative decisions.

The Kipawa River is currently under threat of hydroelectric development by two competing projects which plan to divert the river and would completely alter its natural flow.

The first, proposed by Hydro-Québec, is called TABARET and the other by Innergex on behalf of the Algonquin First Nations based at Wolf Lake. Hydro-Québec has promised hundreds of thousands of dollars per year in 'payments' to the MRC of Temiskaming in exchange for its support of the project.

The TABARET project appears favoured because the OPEMICAN NATIONAL PARK project appears to accommodated the diversion outlet at Lake Temiskaming as envisioned in the project details. The report states: "The potential Parc national d’Opémican will have no influence on the undertaking of either hydroelectric projects currently under study in the county."

== Image gallery ==
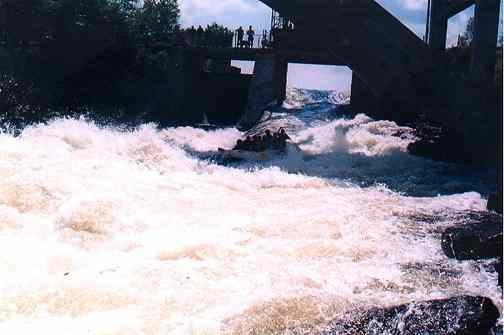
Photo indicates an Esprit Rafting Company Raft descending from the safe, legal and significant navigation of the Laniel Dam.

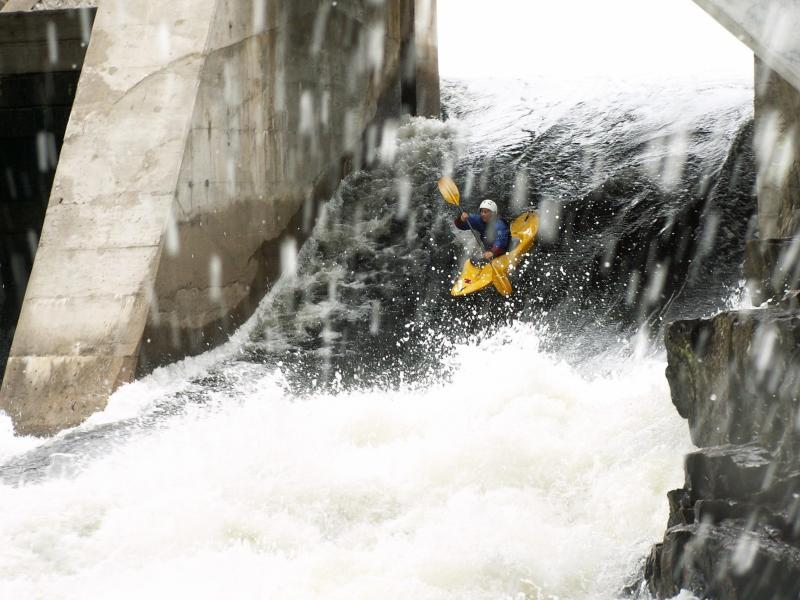
Skilled Kayaker Sadia Loney descending the unobstructed sluiceway of the Laniel Dam

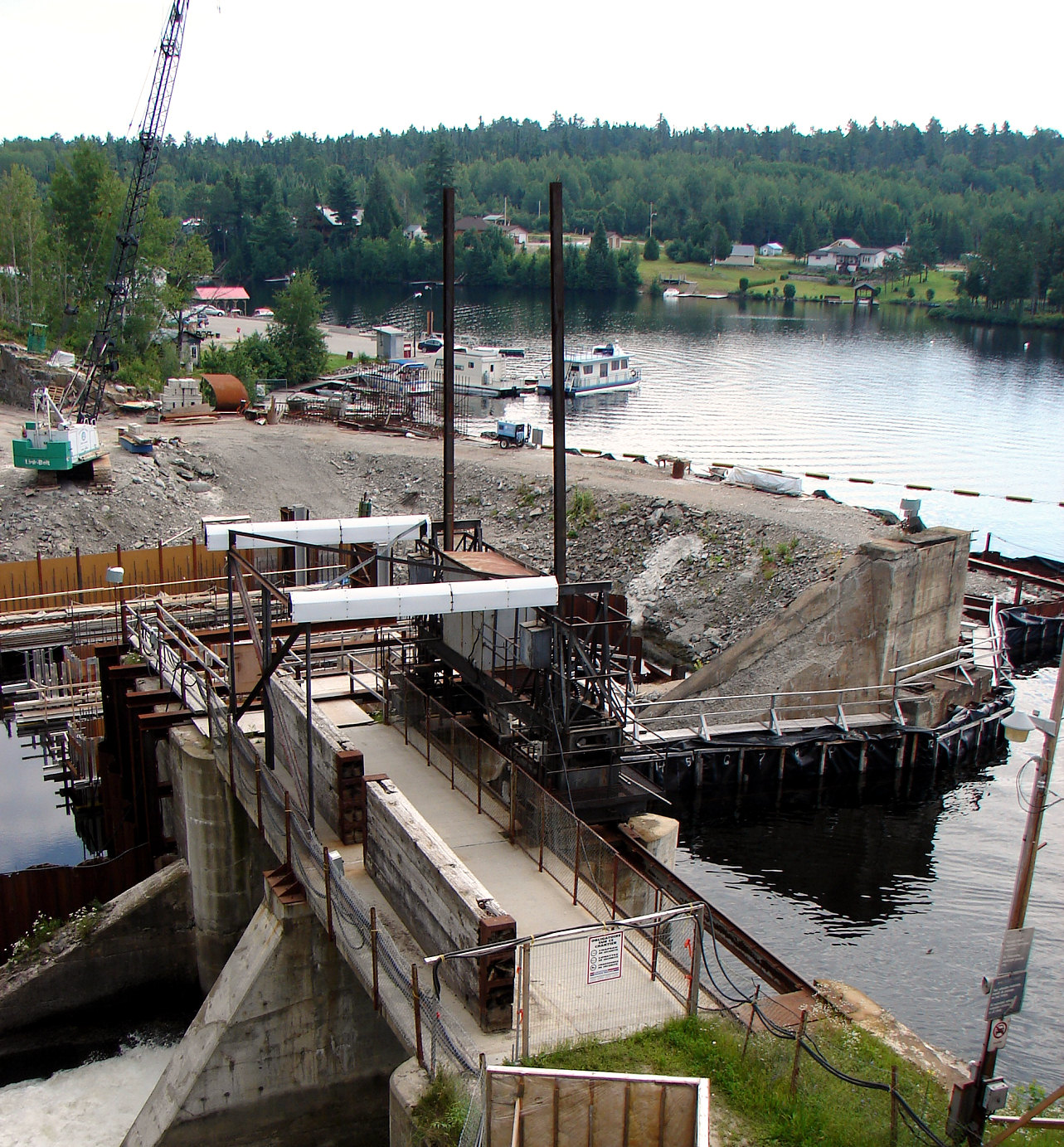
Dam refurbishment in 2007 which removed historical rights of navigation at the location of the dam

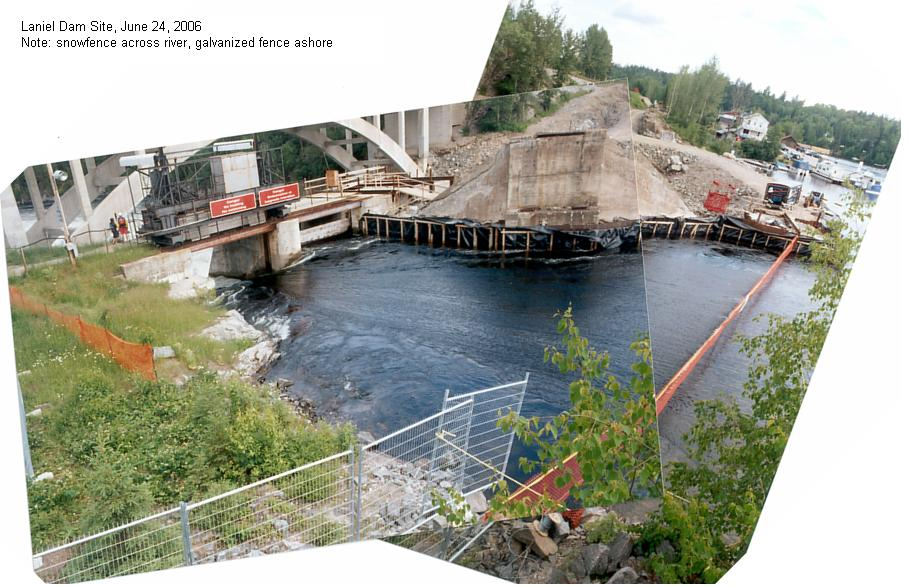
Images indicate snow fence erected to prevent kayaks and rafts from intentionally descending the chute of the dam as had been past practice

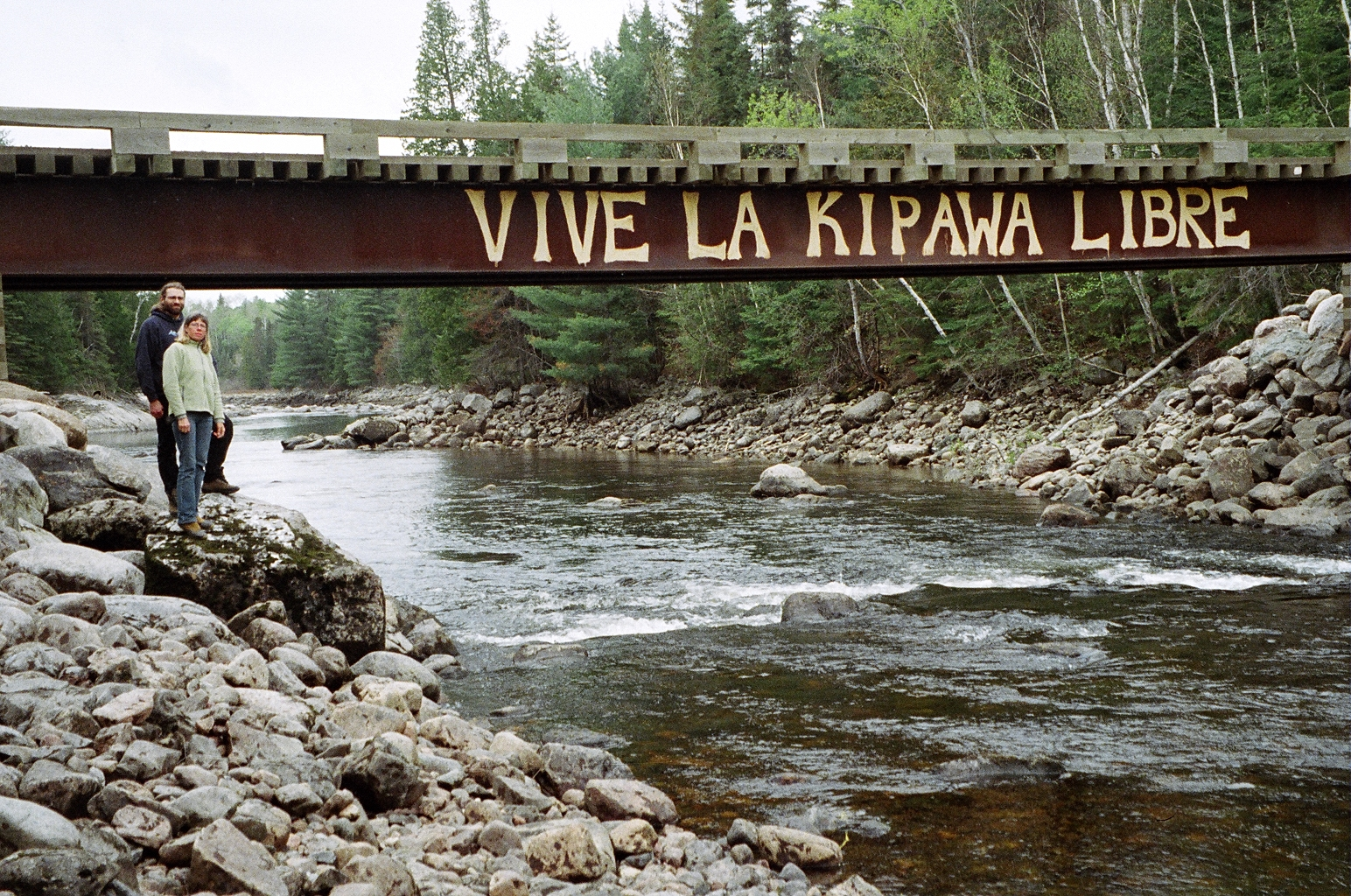
"Long live the free Kipawa"; concerns about inadequate reserve flow are raised during refurbishment of the Laniel Dam

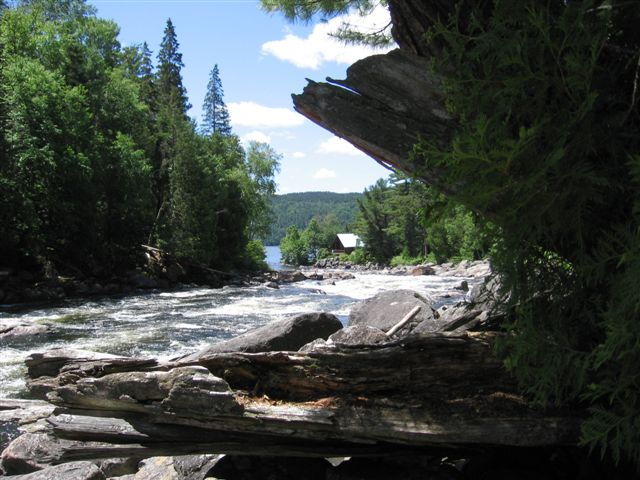
Hollywood rapid at low water

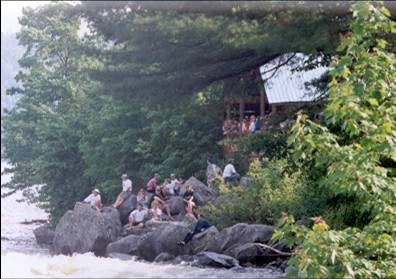
The Kipawa River Rally has become an attraction and economic engine for Laniel.

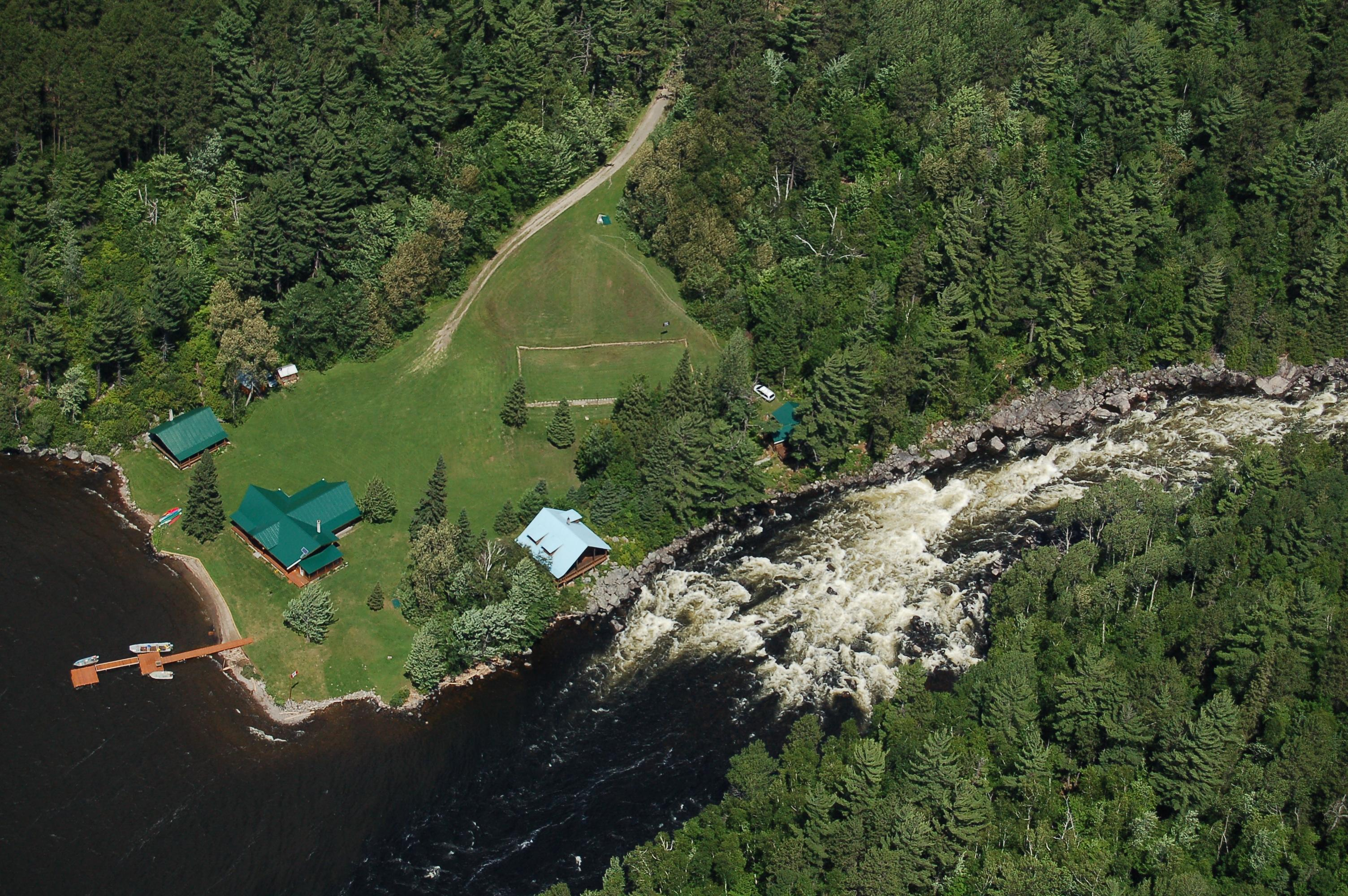
The Kipawa River Lodge at the mouth of the Kipawa River. It was the site for the movie The Silent Enemy.

== See also ==
- List of rivers of Quebec
