= What the Hell Is Going On? =

What The Hell Is Going On?

Studio album by Fox
- Released: 1974
- Recorded: Armstrong's, Melbourne, Australia
- Genre: Glam rock, psychedelic rock, hard rock
- Length: 36:53
- Language: English
- Label: EMI
- Producer: Ian Miller

What The Hell Is Going On? (1974) (EMI EMA 304) is the only known album of the Australian glam psychedelic rock band Fox. Fox appeared in series 1 episode 4 of Countdown, a popular music television program made by the Australian Broadcasting Corporation, performing "I Said". Australian guitarist John Brownrigg, although not a band member, contributed some of the songwriting.

== Artwork ==
The front cover artwork features a photograph of the four band members.

== Track listing ==
Side one
No.	Title	Writer(s)	Length
1.	"I Said"	Laffy, Brownrigg, Upton	3:02
2.	"Who Do"	Brownrigg	3:42
3.	"Slashes"
4.	"Times Come To Change"
5.	"Don't Kid Yourself"

Side two
No.	Title	Length
1.	"Do You Want Me"
2.	"What The Hell Is Going On?"
3.	"Country Max"
4.	"Can You Feel It"
5.	"When You're Not Around"

== Charts ==
Chart (1974)	Peak position
Australian (Kent Music Report)	96

== Personnel ==
Fox

- Peter Laffy - Guitar, Vocals. Laffy later worked with Mondo Rock and Jim Keays.
- Neil Hodgson - Bass, Keyboards
- Michael Upton - Vocals
- Les Oldman - Drums, Percussion, Vocals

Additional personnel

- Col Loughnan - Saxophone

== See also ==
- Encyclopedia of Australian Rock and Pop

== Sources ==
Books

- Kent, David (1993). Australian Chart Book 1970–1992. St Ives, N.S.W.: Australian Chart Book. ISBN 0-646-11917-6.
- Ian McFarlane Encyclopedia of Australian Rock and Pop

Articles

- Wahlquist, Gil (15 September 1974). "Heavyweight Rock". The Sydney Morning Herald.

Web

- "Countdown: Season 1, Episode 4 (#1.4) (29 Nov. 1974)". I Said. IMDb. 1974.
- "Fox album singles". EMI 10586, EMI 10478. EMI. 1974.
- Miller, Ian (2009). "Ian Miller Band". MySpace Bio. Ian Miller.
