= The Fox Inn, Hanwell =

1848 pub in London, England

The Fox Inn
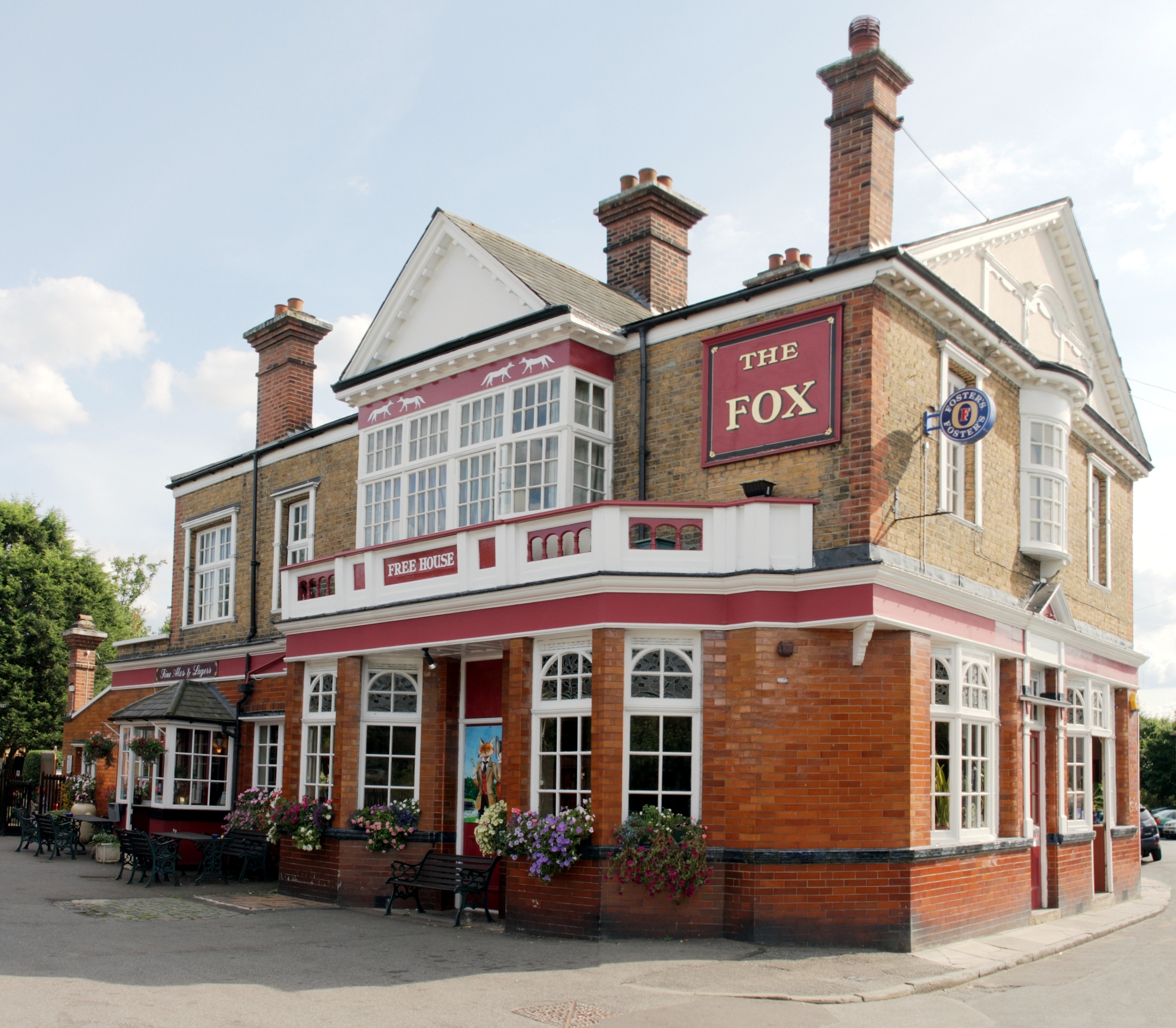

- Location within London Borough of Ealing Location within Greater London
- Address: Green Lane, Hanwell, London W7 2PJ
- Location: England
- Coordinates: 51°30′15″N 0°20′36″W
- Type: Public Free House
- Events: Real ale, food, quiz nights, vintage market, occasional live music in garden, wendy house in beer garden.
- Public transit: Buses: 83, 195, 207, 427, N207, 607, E3, E8. By rail: Hanwell railway station

Construction
- Built: 1848

Website
- www.thefoxpub.co.uk

The Fox Inn is a public house in Green Lane, Hanwell, in the London Borough of Ealing. Built in 1848, it is a largely unspoilt and original mid-Victorian pub. It has received a 'local listing' from Ealing Council as a building of local interest.

== Description ==
The pub is constructed out of local golden-yellow brick with more expensive red bricks used for detailing on corners and chimneys. Rich brown glazed tiles are used for the ground floor exterior walls with coloured stained glass in the fan lights. The upper storey has Mock Tudor detailing, including dentils on the two outward-facing gables.

Most of the interior is also original, although the dividing former off-licence sales door has been closed off and its wall removed to create one large L-shaped bar area. The present-day eating area retains its original wooden wall panelling. One end is used mainly by diners. At the far side of the other end it is also possible to play darts. A wide-screen television is situated at the elbow of the bar for screening special sports events.

On the east of the building itself is a sizeable, sheltered beer garden with wooden decking. There is additional outdoor seating in front of the building and a well ventilated smoking area warmed by radiant heat lamps.

== History ==
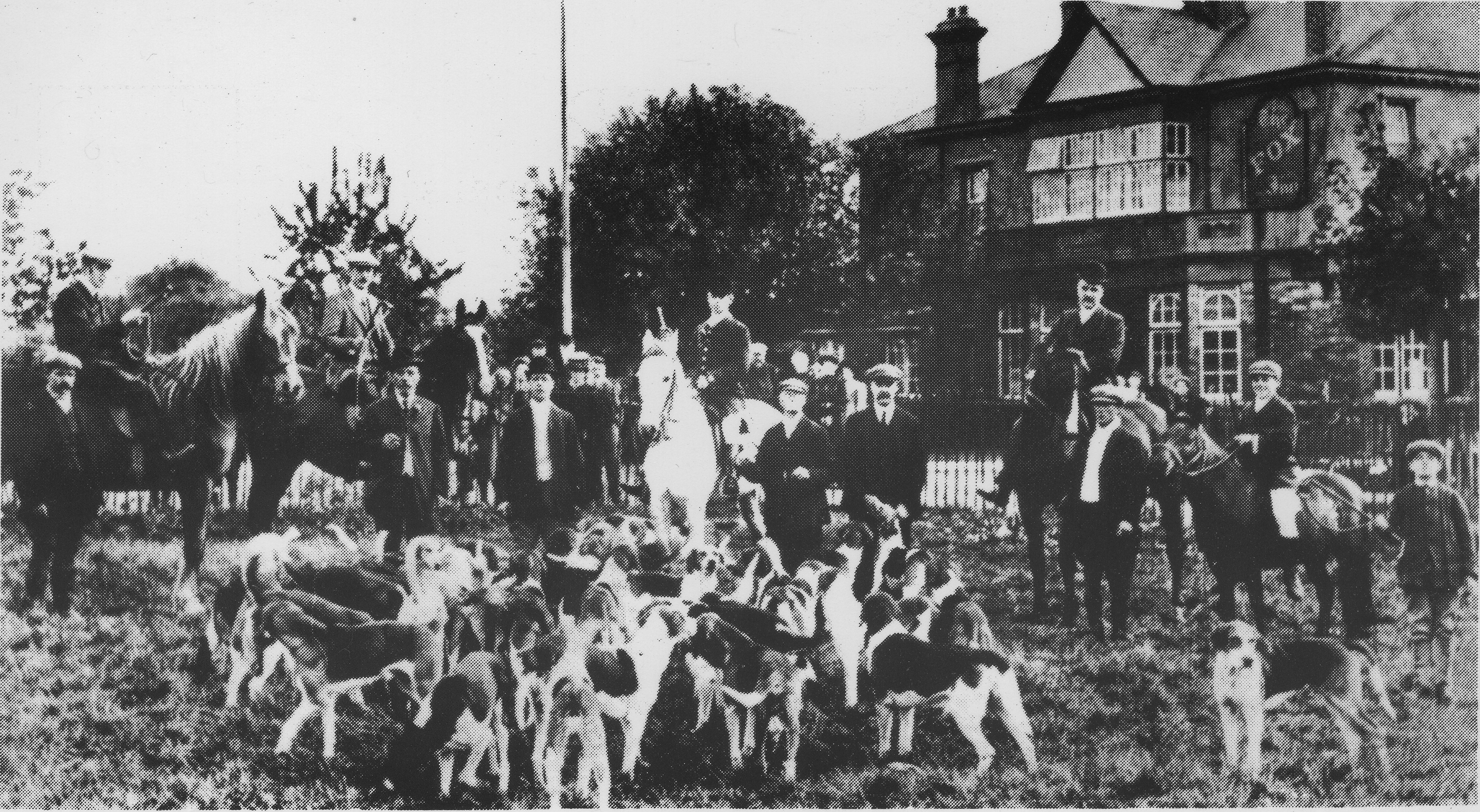
The hunt assembled. c.1910

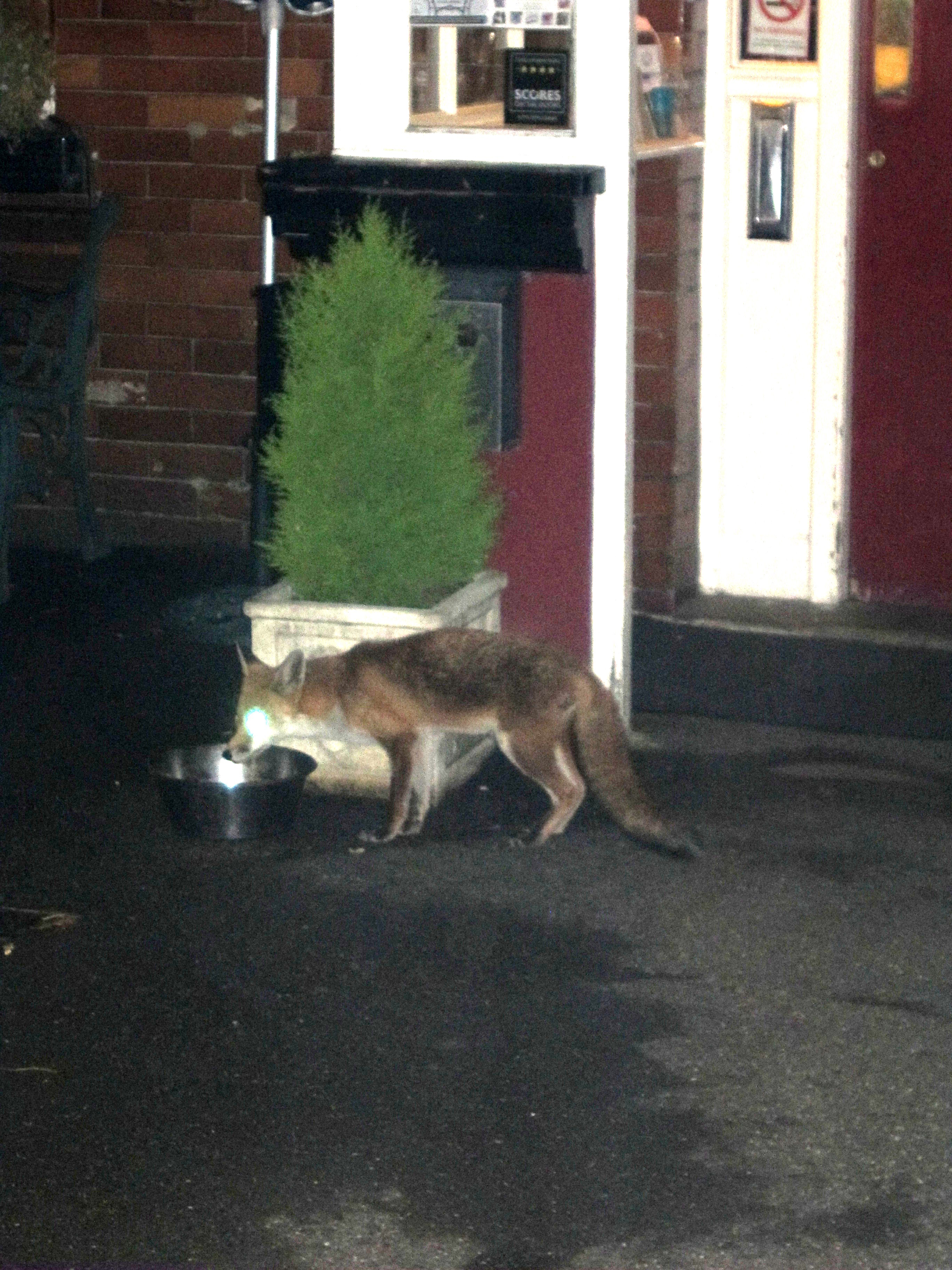
Now foxes come to drink from the dog bowls, outside the Saloon Bar.

Built in 1848, it is a largely unspoilt and original mid-Victorian pub. The Fox was the meeting place for the local fox hunt until the 1920s. The hunt would set off across Hanwell Heath, much of which still existed at that time. Green Lane, on which it situated, is a traditional name for a cattle drove route. Livestock from the west were brought across the River Brent (that is only 50 meters away) on their way to London, for slaughter. The drovers would drink here whilst their animals rested and grazed on the heath. Apart from modern street lamps, things look as they must have done 150 years ago.

The pub is at the bottom end of the Hanwell flight of locks on the Grand Union Canal which is a scheduled ancient monument. It raises the canal by 53 ft over a third of a mile with a series of six locks. Kingfishers, herons and other wild fowl find this area a quiet sanctuary from the modern world. Formally a Royal Brewery (Brentford) house, it was saved from closure and demolition by strong local support in 2001.

The Fox has been named West Middlesex Pub of the Year in 2005, 2007, 2010, 2011, 2012 and 2013.

The Fox hosts a monthly vintage market in its garden, where local people and businesses can sell their products (as well as some from further afield). Outside the pub next to the main entrance to the garden is The Fox's craft barn, which is open at weekends and sells a number of hand-crafted products.

== Annual events ==
=== Beating The Bounds ===
The ancient tradition of Beating the Bounds of Hanwell Parish is re-enacted here each May Day Bank Holiday. The walk starts and finishes at The Fox Inn, and proceeds go to charity.

=== Beer festivals ===
This establishment hosts a beer festival each autumn and Easter Good Friday/Saturday/Sunday.

=== Music ===
The Fox is one of the local pubs to co-host the Hanwell Hootie on the first Saturday of April.

== Media ==
Due to its unspoilt character and easy access, it is listed as a film location.
