= Great Fox Island =

Island in the Chesapeake Bay

Coordinates: 37°53′45″N 75°54′6″W

Great Fox Island, also simply Fox Island, is an island in the Chesapeake Bay. The island has been gradually declining in size in recent decades owing to a combination of rising sea levels and erosion.

== Geography ==
As of 2019, Great Fox Island was 34 acres (0.14 km^{2}) in size, down from 400 acres (1.6 km^{2}) in 1773. This has been attributed to a combination of erosion and sea level rise due to climate change. The island is located in the Chesapeake Bay in Accomack County, Virginia, slightly south of the state line with Maryland. A large hunting lodge was built on the island in 1929.

== Educational programs ==
From 1976 to 2019, the Chesapeake Bay Foundation conducted overnight educational programs on the island for schoolchildren. Approximately 18,000 children participated in these programs over the course of the program. The Foundation abandoned the island in October 2019, citing danger to students from a decrease in protective sea grass and the waterlogging of several hiking trails on the island.
