= Laniel, Quebec =

Laniel
- Unorganized territory
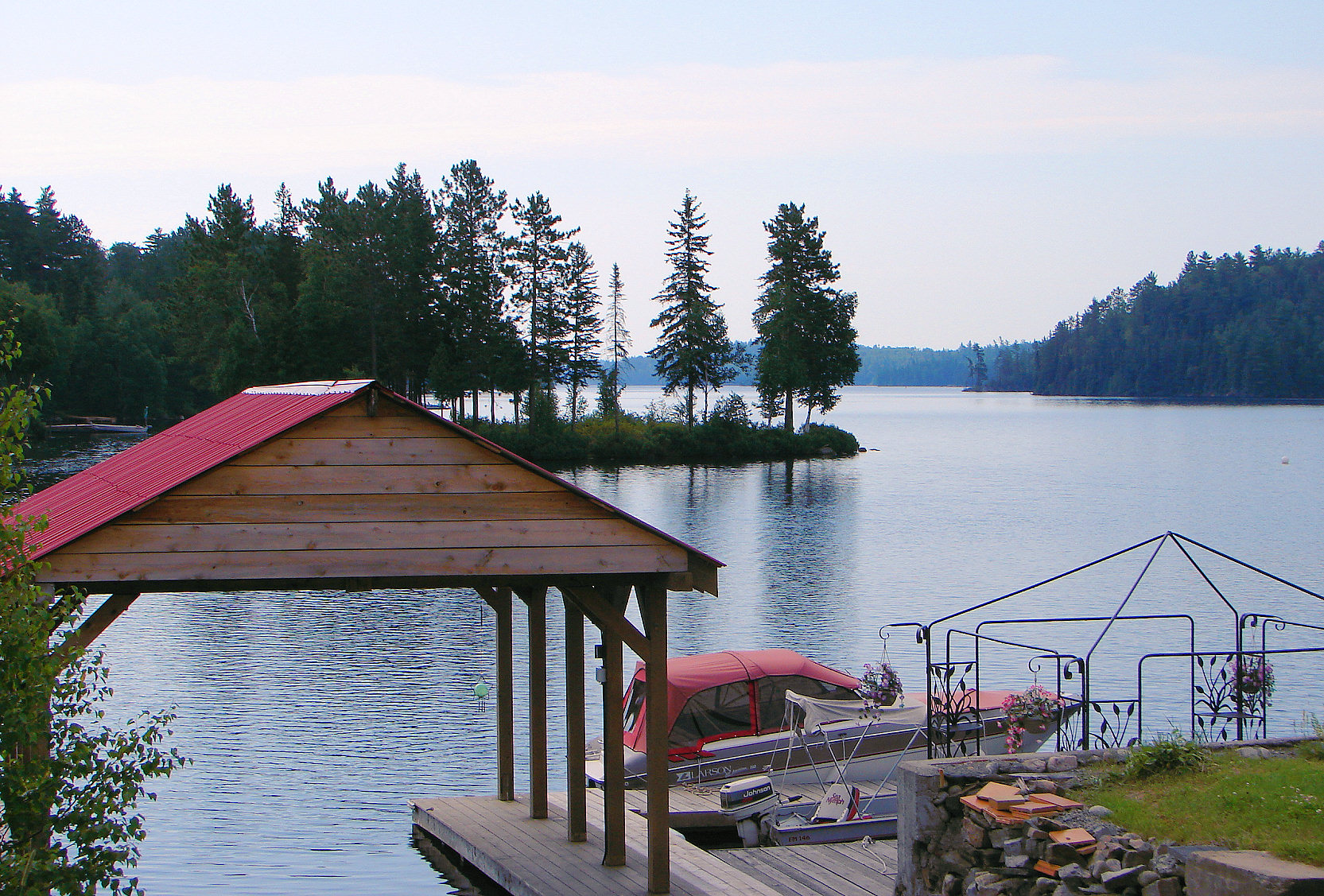
- Boathouse on Lake Kipawa at Laniel

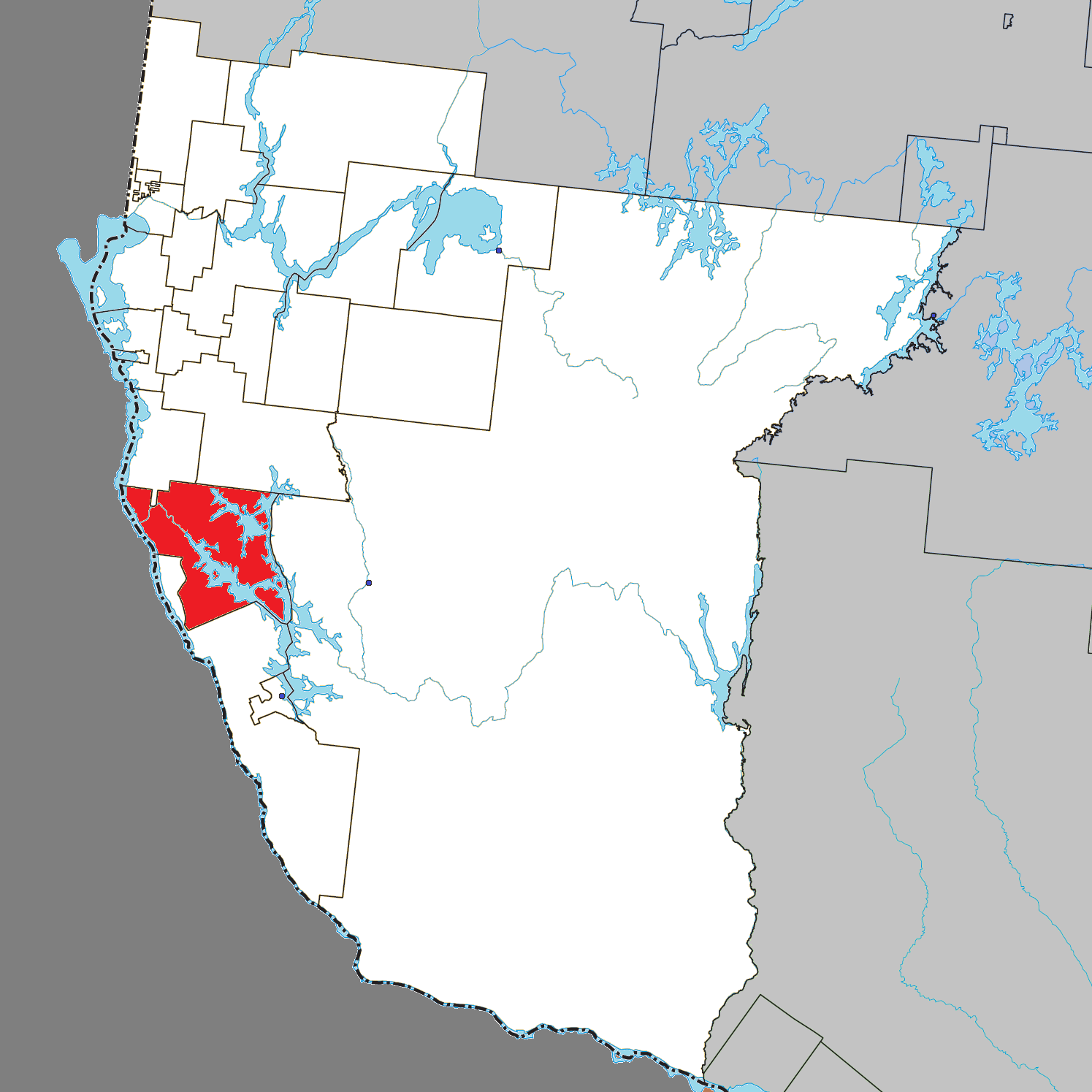
- Location within Témiscamingue RCM

- Location in western Quebec
- Coordinates: 47°03′N 79°16′W
- Country: Canada
- Province: Quebec
- Region: Abitibi-Témiscamingue
- RCM: Témiscamingue
- Constituted: October 31, 2005

Government
  - Federal riding: Abitibi—Témiscamingue
  - Prov. riding: Rouyn-Noranda–Témiscamingue

Area
  - Total: 542.07 km^{2} (209.29 sq mi)
  - Land: 408.20 km^{2} (157.61 sq mi)

Population (2021)
  - Total: 89
  - Density: 0.2/km^{2} (0.52/sq mi)
  - Pop (2016–21): ▲8.5%
  - Dwellings: 185
- Time zone: UTC−5 (EST)
  - Summer (DST): UTC−4 (EDT)

Laniel (French pronunciation: [lanjɛl]) is an unorganized territory in the Témiscamingue Regional County Municipality, Abitibi-Témiscamingue region, Quebec, Canada. It surrounds the northern portion of Lake Kipawa.

Laniel is also a hamlet located within this territory at the outflow of Lake Kipawa where Route 101 crosses the Kipawa River. It was named in honour of priest Armand Laniel (1866–1928). The hamlet used to have a post office that opened in 1934.

In addition to the namesake hamlet, the territory also includes the hamlet of Baie-Dorval (46°59′03″N 79°14′23″W). This hamlet, located on Dorval Bay of Lake Kipawa, was founded in the early 20th century and originally called Baie-Stenhouse, after a forestry entrepreneur in the region. Both the bay and hamlet were renamed in 1989, to honour the first settler family that settled on the bay in 1922.

Until 2005, Laniel and Lacs-du-Témiscamingue unorganized territories were part of the Rivière-Kipawa unorganized territory.

== Demographics ==
Canada census – Laniel, Quebec community profile

	2021	2016
Population	89 (+8.5% from 2016)	82 (+5.1% from 2011)
Land area	408.20 km^{2} (157.61 sq mi)	412.39 km^{2} (159.22 sq mi)
Population density	0.2/km^{2} (0.52/sq mi)	0.2/km^{2} (0.52/sq mi)
Median age	60.4 (M: 60.4, F: 60.4)	64.8 (M: 67.2, F: 63.5)
Private dwellings	185 (total) 57 (occupied)	165 (total) 46 (occupied)
Median household income	$.n/a	$48,000

References: 2021 2016

Historical census populations – Laniel
Year	Pop.	±%
2001	85	—
2006	150	+76.5%
2011	78	−48.0%
2016	82	+5.1%
2021	89	+8.5%
2011 population figure based on revised count. 2001 population figure adjusted figure due to boundary change. Source: Statistics Canada

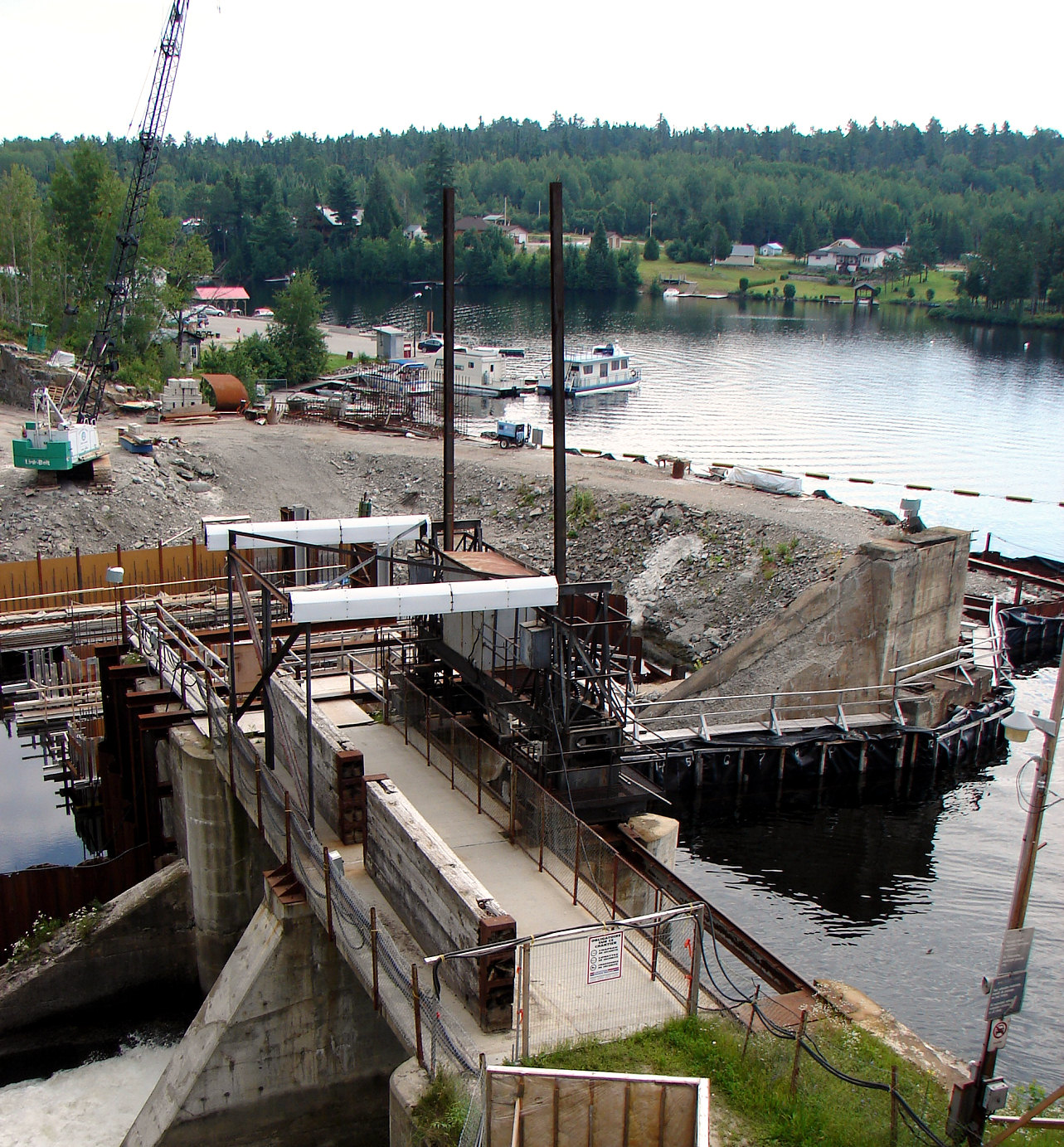
New dam of Lake Kipawa under construction at Laniel

== See also ==
- List of unorganized territories in Quebec
