= Fox Creek (Bee Creek tributary) =

Stream in the American state of Missouri

Physical characteristics
- Source
  - location: Taney County, Missouri
  - coordinates: 36°33′48″N 93°09′13″W
  - elevation: 715 feet (218 m)
- Mouth
  - coordinates: 36°31′30″N 93°05′50″W

Fox Creek is a stream in southern Taney County, Missouri. It is a tributary of Bee Creek. The headwaters of the stream are just east of Missouri Route JJ west of Mincy. The stream flows southeast passing through a portion of the Drury-Mincy Conservation Area to its confluence with Bee Creek which flows into Bull Shoals Lake to the southeast near the Missouri-Arkansas border.

Fox Creek has the name of the local Fox family.

== See also ==
- List of rivers of Missouri
