= Fox Valley =

Fox Valley or Fox River Valley may refer to:

- Fox Valley (Illinois), centered on the Fox River of Northern Illinois, U.S.
- Fox Valley (Wisconsin), centered on the Fox River (Green Bay tributary), U.S.
  - Fox Cities, cities, towns and villages along the Fox River
- Fox Valley, Saskatchewan, a village in Canada
  - Rural Municipality of Fox Valley No. 171
- Fox Valley Mall, in Aurora, Illinois, U.S.

== See also ==
- Fox River Valley Railroad, in eastern Wisconsin 1988–1993
