= Fox Creek (Mississippi River tributary) =

Stream in the US state of Missouri

Coordinates: 39.3050475°N 90.8101277°W

Fox Creek is a stream in Pike County in the U.S. state of Missouri. It is a tributary of the Mississippi River.

Fox Creek was so named on account of foxes in the area.

== See also ==
- List of rivers of Missouri
