= Fox River (Fish River tributary) =

Waterway on the Seward Peninsula in the US

Coordinates: 64.7865°N 163.4923°W

Fox River (Ninaġvik in Inupiaq) is a waterway on the Seward Peninsula in the U.S. state of Alaska. It is 32 miles (51 km) from Solomon. The Fox flows eastward for 18 miles (29 km) before reaching the Fish River from the west.

== Geography ==
It heads about 20 miles (32 km) north of Topkok Head, and after flowing northeastward to the Niukluk lowland, turns southeastward and skirts the edge of the highland to its junction with Fish River. In the lower 10 miles (16 km) of its course, it has a very sinuous channel filled with sand and gravel bars, making the water shallow and navigation for small boats difficult. Above this portion, the valley narrows down and the river channel has nearly a straight course. The gradient of the valley from the head of the river to the mouth is very slight. Where the stream is confined by valley walls, its fall does not exceed 20 feet (6.1 m) to the mile, and below, where it crosses the lowland, the grade is probably less than 10 feet (3.0 m) to the mile. The valley of Fox River is broad, with the bed trenched from 50–100 feet (15–30 m) below the valley floor, leaving a system of benches. The river bed itself is a broad expanse of gravel and sand bars, not entirely covered by water. The bed rock consists of a series of light-gray chloritic micaceous schists, interbedded with which are limestone and graphitic schists. Sills and dikes of rather massive greenstone are very generally distributed along the creek. The alluvium includes pebbles derived from bed fock, light micaceous sands, and in some places quicksands.

== Tributaries ==
Some prospecting has been done near the mouth of I X L Gulch in the margin of one of the many benches common along the Fox River valley. Preparations were being made in 1908 for working claims here on a more economical scale with water brought in a ditch from another tributary of Fox River, known as Blue Rock Creek. I X L Gulch is a small tributary which heads about a mile southwest of Fox River. Slate Creek is another tributary, from the south.

== Geology ==
Along Fox River, about 10 miles (16 km) south of Council, there are several dikes of greenstone that under the microscope are found to be slightly altered diabase. They consist of labradorite and olivine phenocrysts in a groundmass of plagioclase, augite, and biotite. Some greenstone masses which appeared to be slightly altered tuffs were found in the divide between Fox and Solomon rivers.
