= Fox, Virginia =

Unincorporated community in Grayson County, Virginia, United States

Fox
- Unincorporated community
- Location within Virginia Location within the United States
- Coordinates: 36°36′33″N 081°17′36″W
- Country: United States
- State: Virginia
- County: Grayson
- Elevation: 2,590 ft (790 m)
- Time zone: UTC-5 (Eastern (EST))
  - Summer (DST): UTC-4 (EDT)
- ZIP code: 24348
- Area code: 540
- GNIS feature ID: 1477339

Fox is an unincorporated community in Grayson County, Virginia, United States, located at the intersection of U.S. Route 58 (Wilson Highway) and State Route 711 (Fox Creek Road and Maple Road).

Fox has a cemetery, the Fox Union Cemetery, located on Fox Creek Road.

== Geography ==
Fox sits at an elevation of 2,592 feet (790 m) in rolling hills within the Appalachian Mountains near the Virginia-North Carolina border. It is north of the New River and west of Fox Creek.
