= Fox Creek (Muckalee Creek tributary) =

Physical characteristics
- Source
  - coordinates: 31.9143364°N 84.1110164°W
- Mouth
  - coordinates: 31.8401697°N 84.1626858°W

Fox Creek is a stream in the U.S. state of Georgia. It is a tributary to Muckalee Creek.

The Fox Creek most likely comes from the Native Americans of the area, who saw foxes near its course.
