= Fox (automobile company) =

Defunct American motor vehicle manufacturer

Fox logo

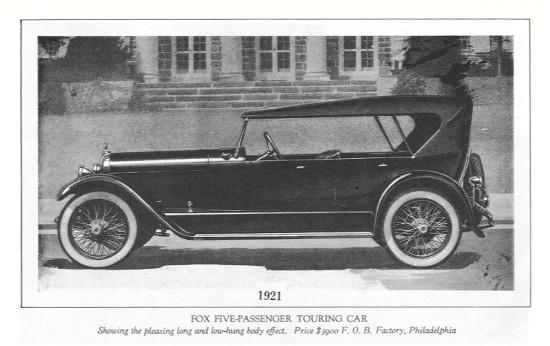
1921 Fox Five-passenger Touring Car

The Fox Motor Company was an automobile company in Philadelphia, Pennsylvania from 1921 to 1923.

== History ==
The Fox Motor Company was founded by Ansley H. Fox (who had already invented the Fox Shotgun) as his second idea for a company. It was organized on November 21, 1919, but did not begin production until March 1921. The cars had air-cooled engines, and, some claim, were the only cars to give Franklin Automobile company a small run-for-its money. It was claimed to get 20 mpg. The cars were bigger than the Franklins. However, it took a long time to get into regular production, and the company could not get enough investors. Therefore, in 1923, the company went out of business.

=== Models ===
Model (year)	Engine	Displacement	HP	Wheelbase
Model A-1 (1921)	Air-cooled 6-cylinder	4398 cc	50	128"
Model A-1 (1922)	Air-cooled 6-cylinder	4398 cc	50	132"
Model A-1 (1923)	Air-cooled 6-cylinder	4398 cc	50	132"
