= Fox Creek (Meramec River tributary) =

Stream in the American state of Missouri

Coordinates: 38°27′24″N 90°41′06″W

Fox Creek is a stream in Franklin and St. Louis counties in the U.S. state of Missouri. It is a tributary of the Meramec River.

Fox Creek was named for the abundance of foxes near its course.

== See also ==
- List of rivers of Missouri
