= Fox Creek (South Dakota) =

Stream in South Dakota, U.S.

Coordinates: 44°51′20″N 100°44′21″W

Fox Creek is a stream in the U.S. state of South Dakota.

Fox Creek takes its name from nearby Fox Ridge.

== See also ==
- List of rivers of South Dakota
