= The Fox (magazine) =

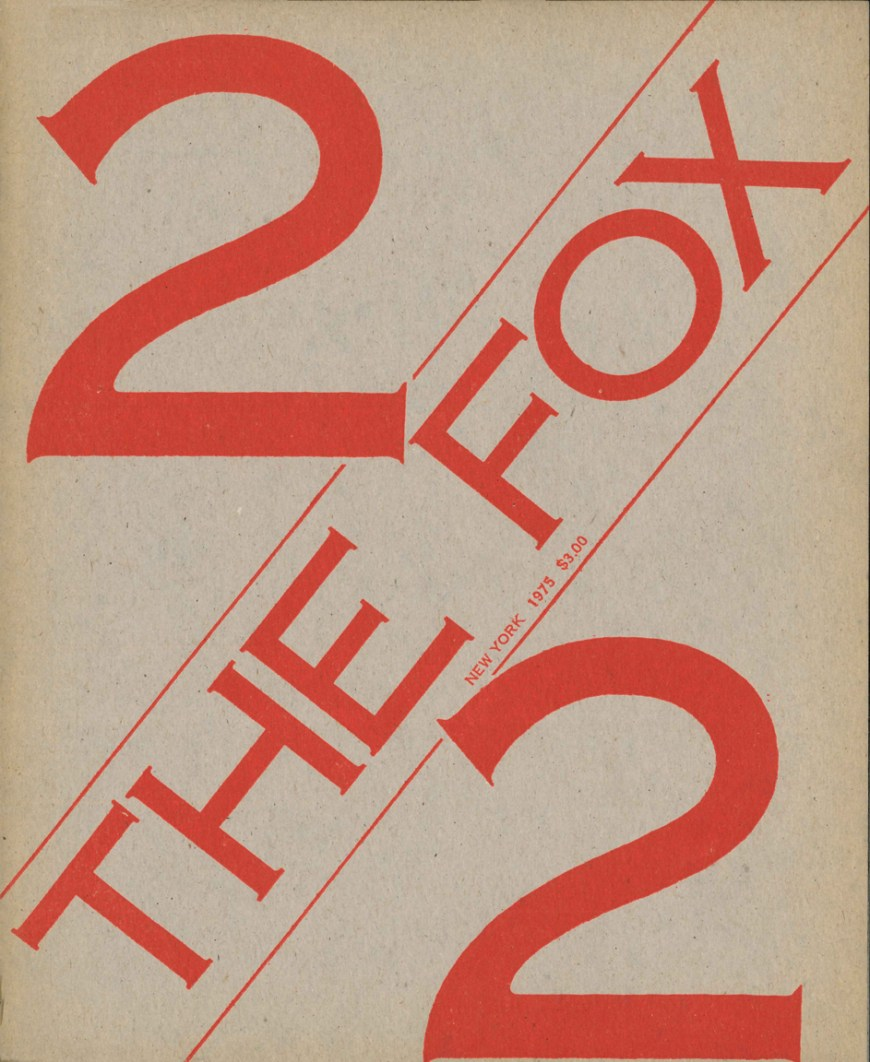
Cover of The Fox, issue 2

The Fox was a conceptual art magazine founded in 1975 by Sarah Charlesworth and Joseph Kosuth. It ran for three issues from 1975–76, and "in its short span ... contained some of the sharpest art writing of the period, and articulated new modes of artistic collaboration that shifted focus away from the idea of the individual creative genius. Before long, however, differences of political approach among the members—whose politics spanned the radical left from Maoism to Anarchism—and the insistence of the art world in focusing on certain group members brought The Fox to a close."
