= Kipawa, Quebec =

Kipawa
- Municipality
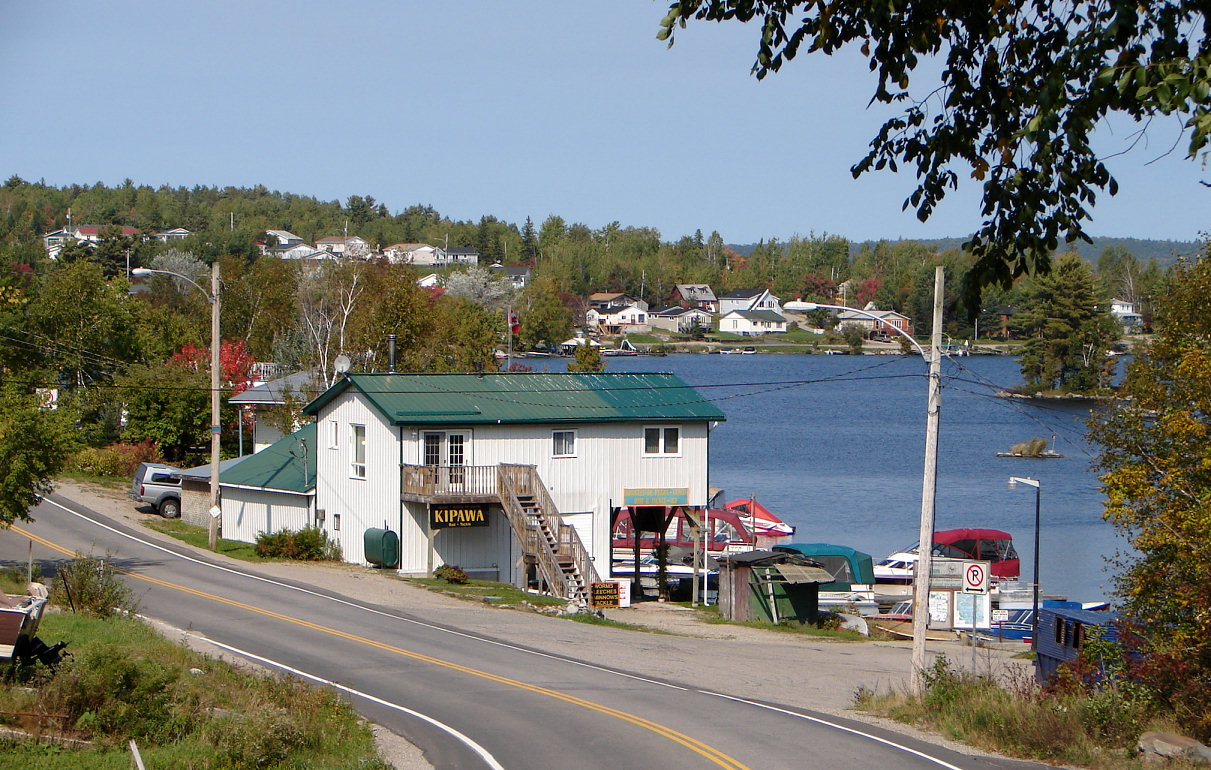

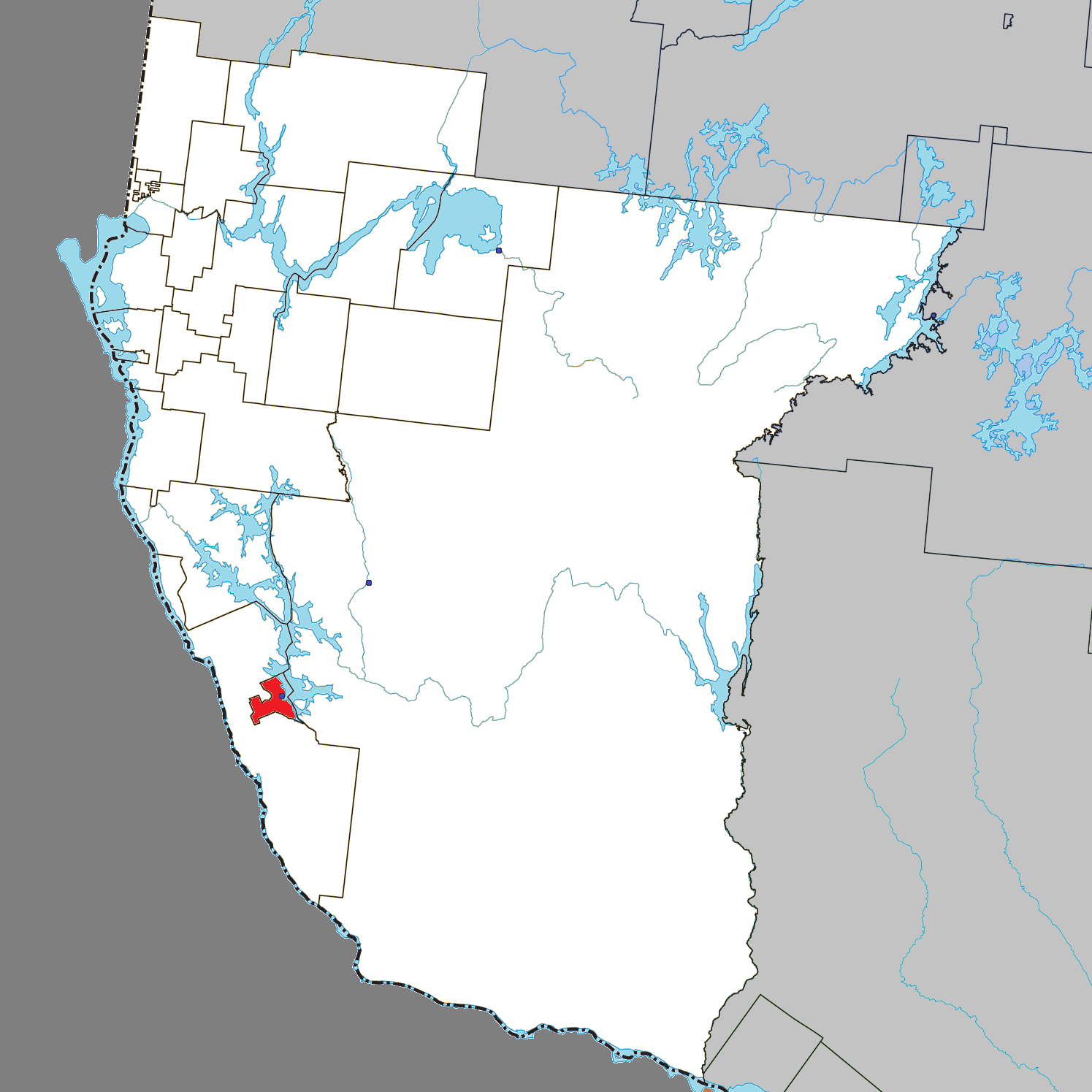
- Location within Témiscamingue RCM

- Location in western Quebec
- Coordinates: 46°47′N 78°59′W
- Country: Canada
- Province: Quebec
- Region: Abitibi-Témiscamingue
- RCM: Témiscamingue
- Settled: 1870s
- Constituted: January 1, 1985

Government
  - Mayor: Norman Young
  - Federal riding: Abitibi—Témiscamingue
  - Prov. riding: Rouyn-Noranda–Témiscamingue

Area
  - Total: 46.84 km^{2} (18.09 sq mi)
  - Land: 35.58 km^{2} (13.74 sq mi)

Population (2021)
  - Total: 446
  - Density: 12.5/km^{2} (32/sq mi)
  - Pop (2016–21): ▼10.6%
  - Dwellings: 325
- Time zone: UTC−5 (EST)
  - Summer (DST): UTC−4 (EDT)
- Postal code(s): J0Z 2H0
- Area code: 819
- Highways: No major routes
- Website: www.kipawa.ca

Kipawa is a village and municipality in western Quebec, Canada, in the Témiscamingue Regional County Municipality. It is located at the south end of Lake Kipawa, adjacent to the Kebaowek Reserve. In addition to the community of Kipawa itself located on the namesake lake, the municipality also includes the community of Tee Lake (originally called Gendreau at the end of the 19th century), and surrounds the Indian Reserve of Kebaowek.

Kipawa is a variant of the Algonquin word Kebaowek which means "closed water," referring to the many closed-off bays and passages of Lake Kipawa. Another theory claims that it means "getting off" or "disembarkation," or the location at which one can pick up supplies or trade.

Its main employer is the Commonwealth Plywood Company.

== History ==
The land including and surrounding Lake Kipawa and Kipawa Village has been inhabited for centuries by the Algonquin people. The first Europeans to come into the Kipawa basin were fur traders and missionaries.

The area was logged in the second half of the 19th century, and the railroad was built in the 1880s, with its stations known as Kipawa Station et Kipawa Junction.

On January 1, 1985, the Municipality of Kipawa was created out of previously unincorporated area.

== Demographics ==
In the 2021 Census of Population conducted by Statistics Canada, Kipawa had a population of 446 living in 214 of its 325 total private dwellings, a change of −10.6% from its 2016 population of 499. With a land area of 35.58 km^{2} (13.74 sq mi), it had a population density of 12.5/km^{2} (32.5/sq mi) in 2021.

Canada census – Kipawa, Quebec community profile

	2021	2016	2011
Population	446 (-10.6% from 2016)	516 (8.9% from 2011)	474 (-16.1% from 2006)
Land area	35.58 km^{2} (13.74 sq mi)	36.59 km^{2} (14.13 sq mi)	36.76 km^{2} (14.19 sq mi)
Population density	12.5/km^{2} (32/sq mi)	14.1/km^{2} (37/sq mi)	12.9/km^{2} (33/sq mi)
Median age	54.4 (M: 55.6, F: 53.2)	49.5 (M: 50.2, F: 48.5)	45.9 (M: 45.8, F: 46)
Private dwellings	325 (total) 214 (occupied)	339 (total) 229 (occupied)	276 (total) 208 (occupied)
Median household income	$80,000	$74,624	$68,984

References: 2021 2016 2011

Historical census populations – Kipawa, Quebec

Year	Pop.	±%
1986	404	—
1991	507	+25.5%
1996	549	+8.3%
2001	521	−5.1%

Year	Pop.	±%
2006	565	+8.4%
2011	474	−16.1%
2016	499	+5.3%
2021	446	−10.6%

Population figures based on revised counts.
Source: Statistics Canada

Mother tongue (2021):

- English as first language: 42.7%
- French as first language: 52.8%
- English and French as first language: 3.4%
- Other as first language: 1.1%

== See also ==
- List of anglophone communities in Quebec
- List of municipalities in Quebec
