= Fox Creek (Sugar Creek tributary) =

Stream in the US state of Missouri

Fox Creek is a stream in Harrison County, Missouri. It is a tributary of Sugar Creek.

The coordinates of the stream source are: 40°16′24″N 93°51′57″W. The coordinates of the stream mouth are: 40°11′09″N 93°49′48″W.

Fox Creek was named for the foxes which once were frequent in the area.

== See also ==
- List of rivers of Missouri
