= Lake Kipawa =

Reservoir in Quebec, Canada

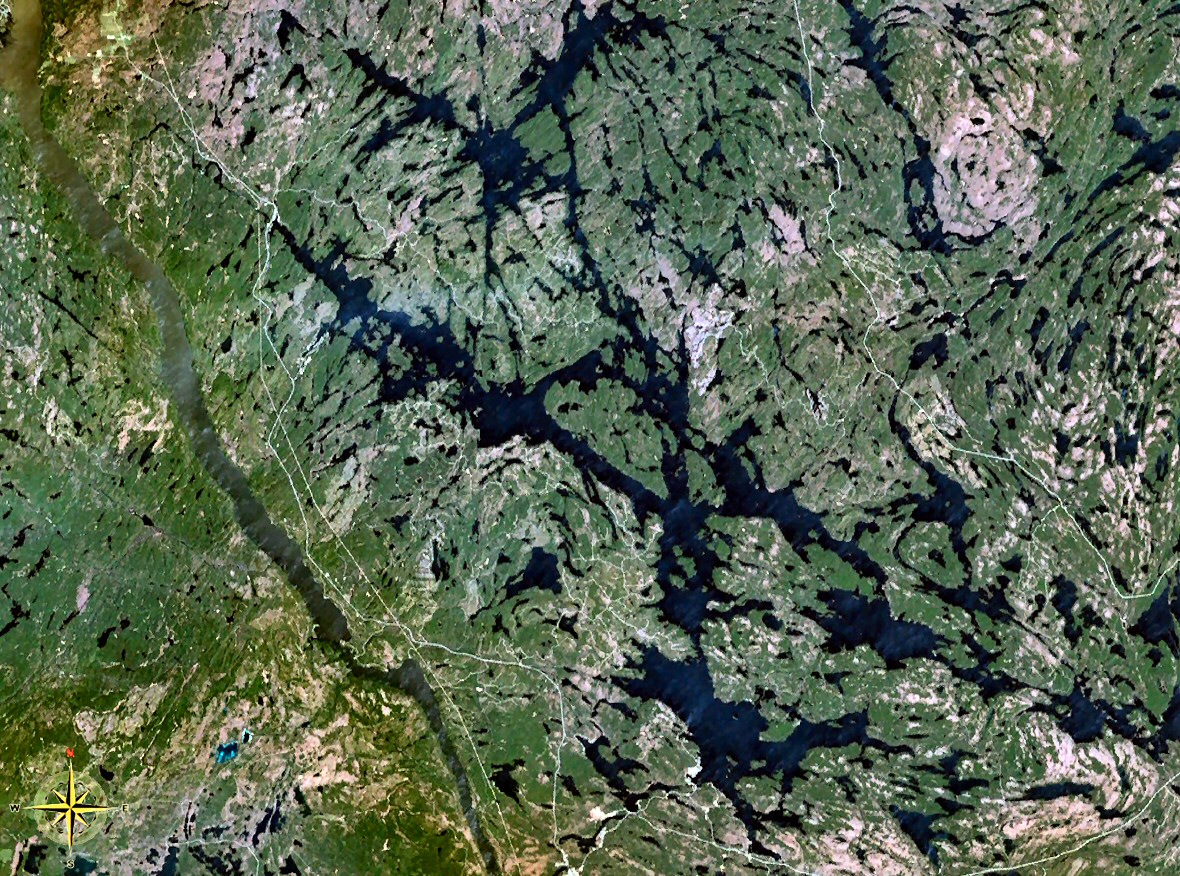
- Satellite view of Lake Kipawa

- Location within Quebec
- Location: Témiscamingue Regional County Municipality, Quebec
- Coordinates: 46°53′05″N 78°58′04″W
- Primary inflows: Kipawa River
- Primary outflows: Kipawa River, Gordon Creek
- Basin countries: Canada
- Surface area: 300 km^{2} (120 sq mi)
- Surface elevation: 268 m (879 ft)

Lake Kipawa (in French: Lac Kipawa) is a lake in far south-west Quebec, Canada, near the border with Ontario, north of Témiscaming, Quebec. Also see Kipawa River which is the only natural outflow of Kipawa Lake, Gordon Creek in Témiscaming on the south end being artificial.

Lake Kipawa is currently the source of debate among Innergex and Hydro Quebec concerning water rights for their competing hydro electric projects.

Lake Kipawa has a highly irregular shape, with deep bays (such as Chemagan, des Plongeurs, du Huard, Dorval, Pratt, des Anglais, and Campbell) and large islands (notably McKenzie and aux Ours). It forms a vast labyrinth with many other interconnecting bodies of water. Bordering the lake are the communities of Kipawa, Laniel, and the Keboawek Reserve. The lake is popular with fishermen for its walleye and northern pike abundance, as well as a supply of trout. Various lodges (such as Kipawa Lodge which is located at Edward's Narrows and Alwaki Lodge, which is located on Thompson Island) bordering the lake offer hunting and fishing tours and accommodations.

The lake's name, of Algonquin origin, has been written in many different forms before "Kipawa" became official in 1968: Kippawa, Kippewa, Kepawa, Keepawe (1884), Kipawe, Kipakowe, Kipahowe.

Lake Kipawa was the epicentre of the 2000 Kipawa earthquake.

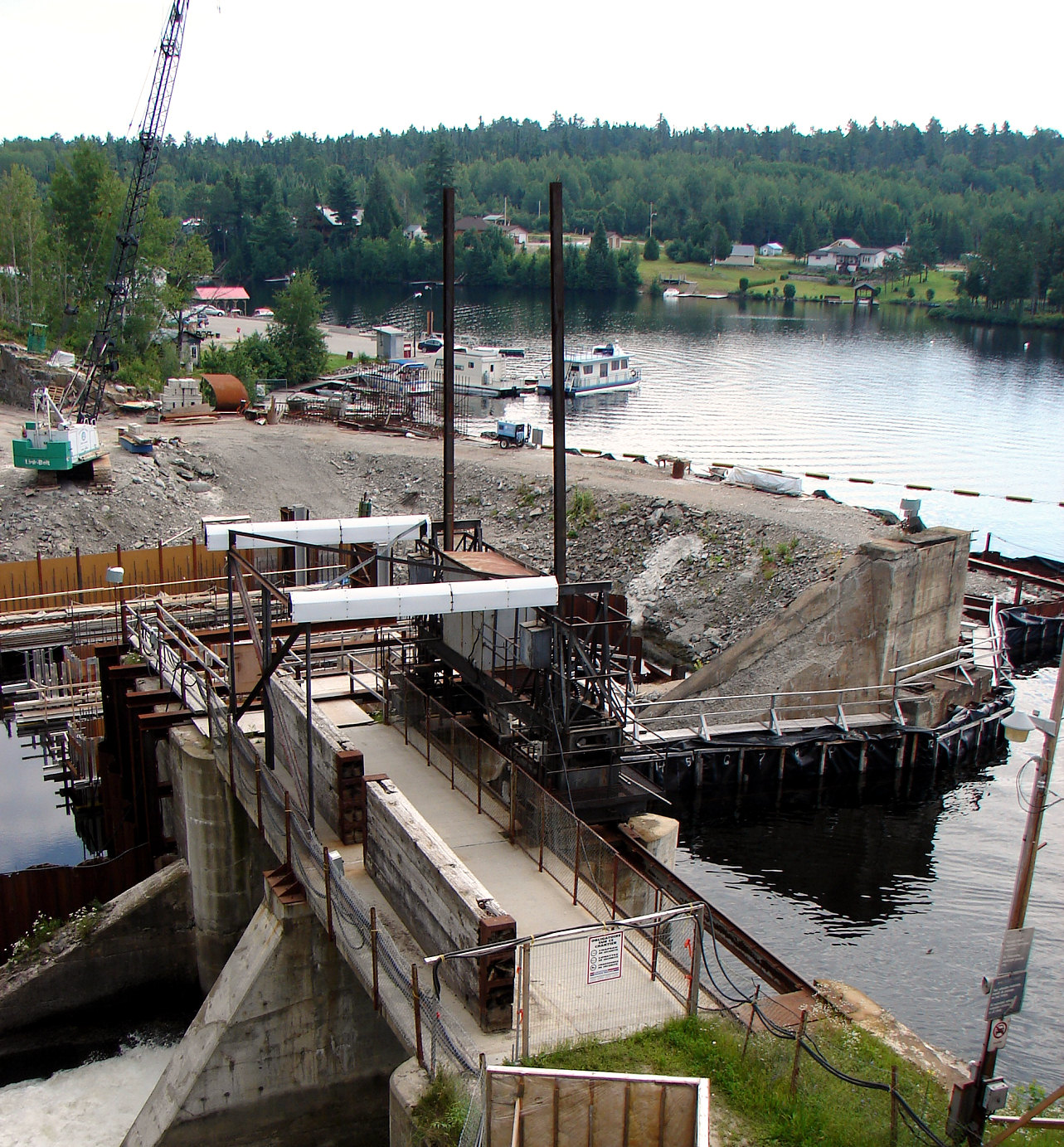
New dam of Lake Kipawa under construction at Laniel in 2007

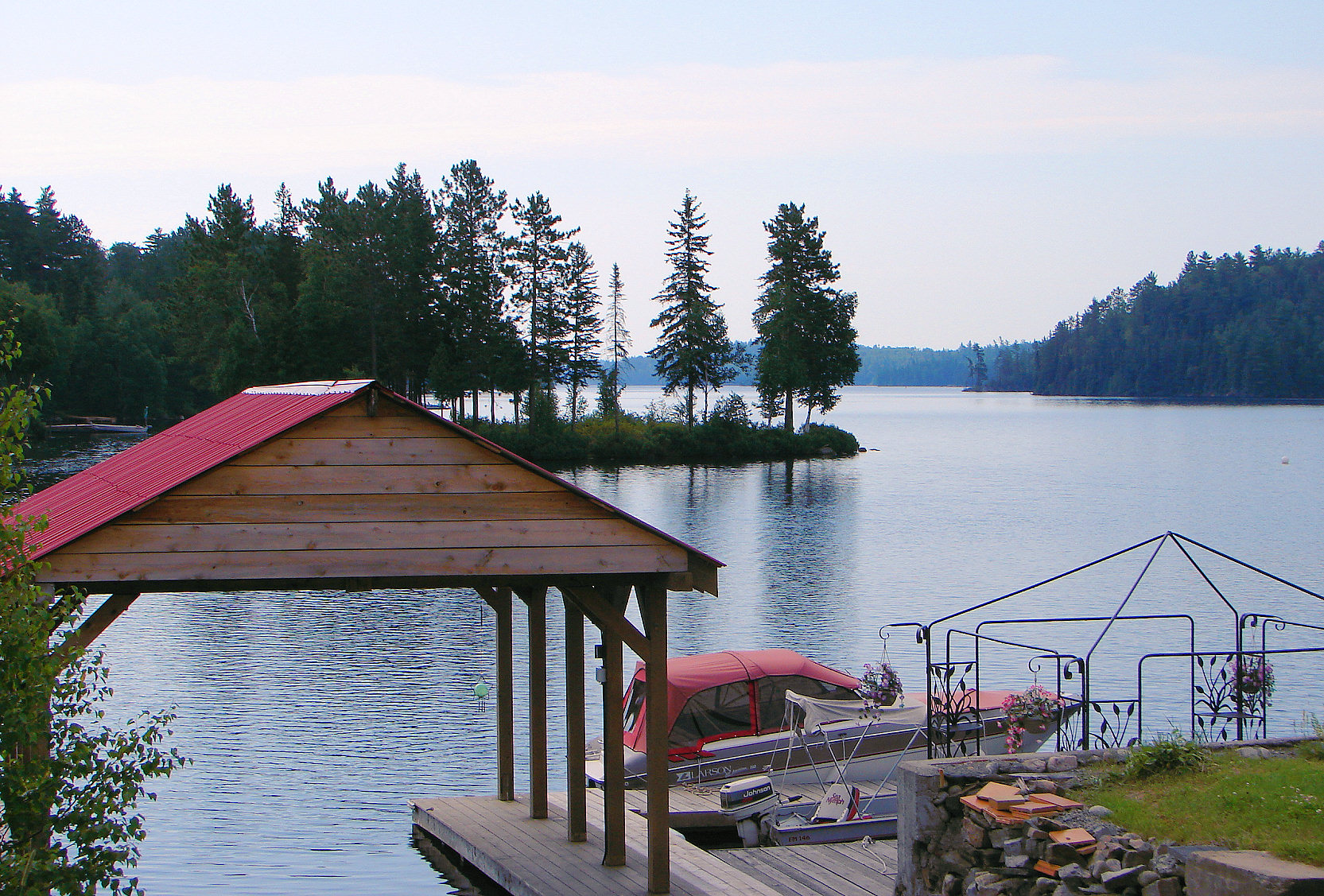
Boathouse on Lake Kipawa at Laniel

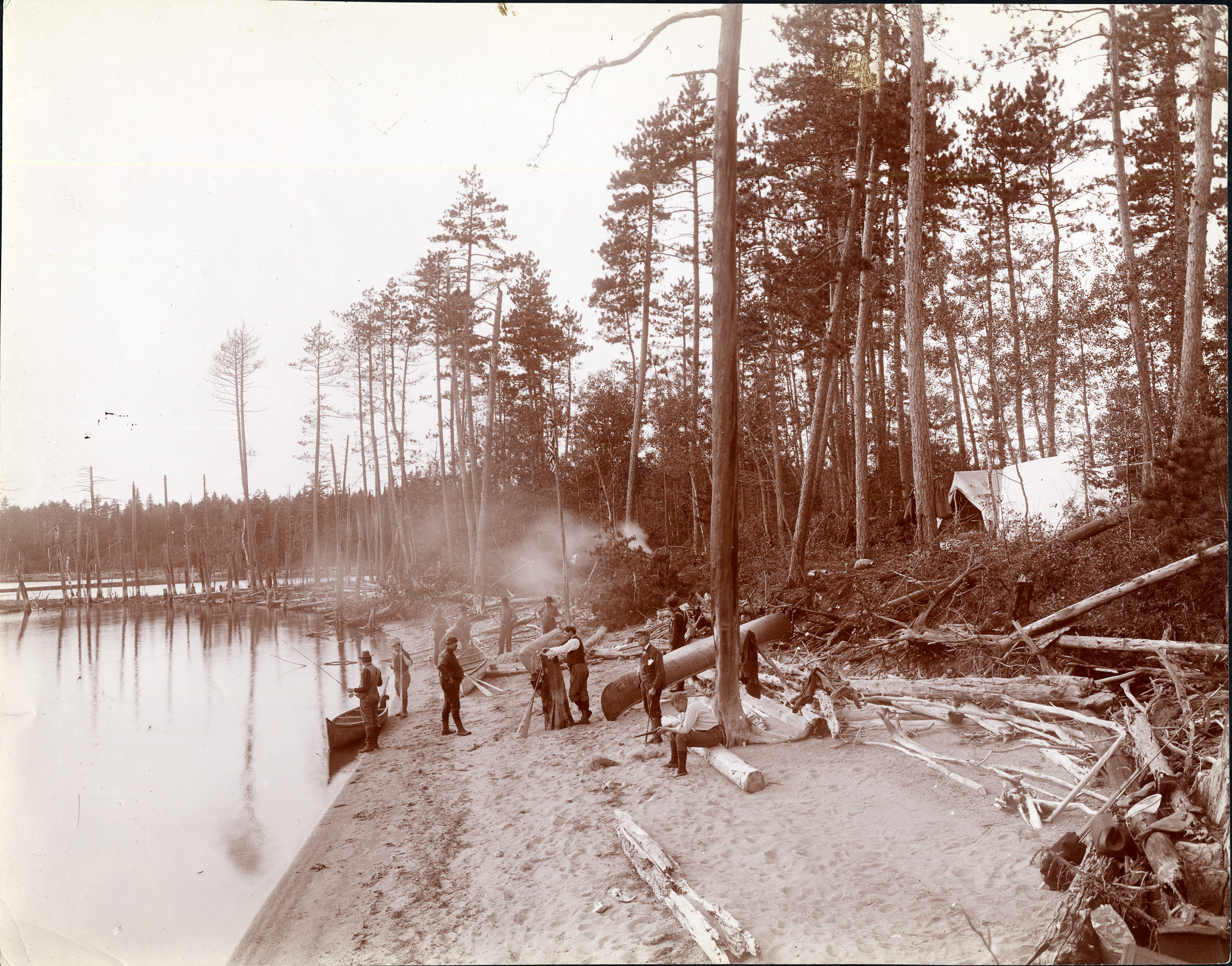
Moose hunting camp on Lake Kipawa (between 1890 and 1910)
