= Émilise Lessard-Therrien =

Canadian politician (born 1991)

- Lessard-Therrien in 2022

Co-Spokesperson for Québec Solidaire
- In office November 26, 2023 – April 29, 2024
- Preceded by: Manon Massé
- Succeeded by: Christine Labrie (interim)

Member of the National Assembly of Quebec for Rouyn-Noranda–Témiscamingue
- In office October 1, 2018 – August 28, 2022
- Preceded by: Luc Blanchette
- Succeeded by: Daniel Bernard

Personal details
- Born: November 27, 1991 (age 34) Duhamel-Ouest, Quebec, Canada
- Party: Québec solidaire
- Education: UQAM; Université du Québec en Abitibi-Témiscamingue
- Profession: Teacher, organic farmer

Émilise Lessard-Therrien (born November 27, 1991) is a Québécoise politician, who was a co-spokesperson of Québec solidaire from 2023 to 2024. She was elected to the National Assembly of Quebec in the 2018 Quebec general election. She represented the electoral district of Rouyn-Noranda–Témiscamingue as a member of Québec solidaire until her defeat in the 2022 Quebec general election.

In November 2023, Lessard-Therrien was elected co-spokesperson of Québec Solidaire at the party congress in Gatineau, defeating Ruba Ghazal and Christine Labrie. She obtained 50.3% of the votes in the second round, against 49.7% for Ghazal. After taking leave for health reasons in late March 2024, she resigned as co-spokesperson on April 29 of the same year.

She is a proponent of Quebec independence, regional decentralization and food sovereignty in Quebec. She is engaged in campaigns against arsenic pollution emitted by the copper factory Fonderie Horne in Rouyn-Noranda.

In March 2019, Lessard-Therrien in an interview expressed concern over possible land grabs in the province by Chinese investors. She said that, with climate change, Quebec would be one of the few places left with good, arable land and fresh water in a few years' time and that the Temiscamingue region had much unexploited land that was being scouted by Chinese investors. She also said "Between us, we call them predators," she said. "They are predators of agricultural land. And we see them, we feel them. And what I'm saying is that fallow land still has potential to be farmed again, but land that belongs to China may never feed Quebecers, and it's important that we be concerned now." Responding to the criticism, she acknowledged that her statement was badly formulated, and that she was critical of large investors dominating agricultural lands, no matter where they are from.

== Electoral record ==
2022 Quebec general election: Rouyn-Noranda–Témiscamingue
Party	Candidate	Votes	%	±%
Coalition Avenir Québec	Daniel Bernard	12,975	45.16	+14.82
Québec solidaire	Émilise Lessard-Therrien	8,890	30.94	-1.14
Parti Québécois	Jean-François Vachon	3,232	11.25	-7.06
Conservative	Robert Daigle	2,202	7.66	+6.79
Liberal	Arnaud Warolin	1,255	4.37	-12.02
Green	Chantal Corswarem	178	0.62	-0.72
Total valid votes		28,732	98.93	–
Total rejected ballots		310	1.07	-0.29
Turnout		29,042	64.91	-0.69
Electors on the lists		44,742	–	–
Coalition Avenir Québec gain from Québec solidaire		Swing		+7.98

2018 Quebec general election: Rouyn-Noranda–Témiscamingue
Party	Candidate	Votes	%	±%
Québec solidaire	Émilise Lessard-Therrien	9,304	32.08	+20.52
Coalition Avenir Québec	Jérémy G. Bélanger	8,798	30.33	+13.07
Parti Québécois	Gilles Chapadeau	5,311	18.31	-13.92
Liberal	Luc Blanchette	4,753	16.39	-21.59
Green	Jessica Wells	389	1.34	
Conservative	Guillaume Lanouette	253	0.87	
Citoyens au pouvoir	Fernand St-Georges	195	0.67	
Total valid votes		29,003	98.64	
Total rejected ballots		400	1.36	-0.81
Turnout		29,403	65.60	+1.35
Eligible voters		44,824		
Québec solidaire gain from Liberal		Swing		+21.06
Source(s) "Rapport des résultats officiels du scrutin". Élections Québec.
