= Gilles Baril =

Gilles Baril may refer to:

- Gilles Baril (PQ) (born 1957), Canadian businessman, journalist and former politician
- Gilles Baril (Liberal) (born 1940), Canadian politician
