= Rouyn-Noranda =

- City
- Ville de Rouyn-Noranda
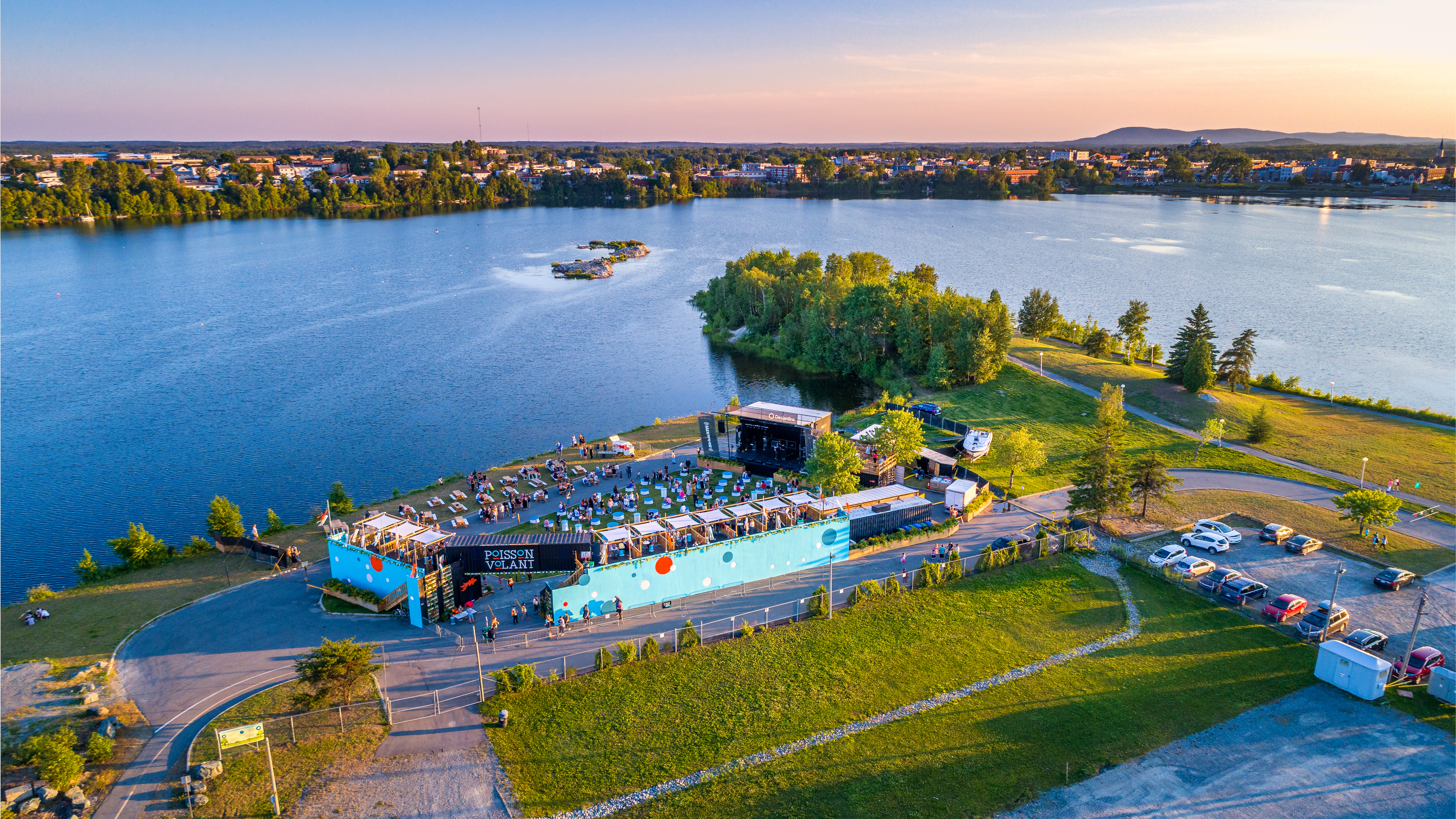
- Poisson vollant site with the Rouyn sector in the background

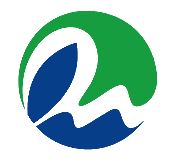
- Seal Logo
- Motto: "Fierté, Solidarité, Savoir" ("Pride, Solidarity, Knowledge")
- Location in province of Quebec

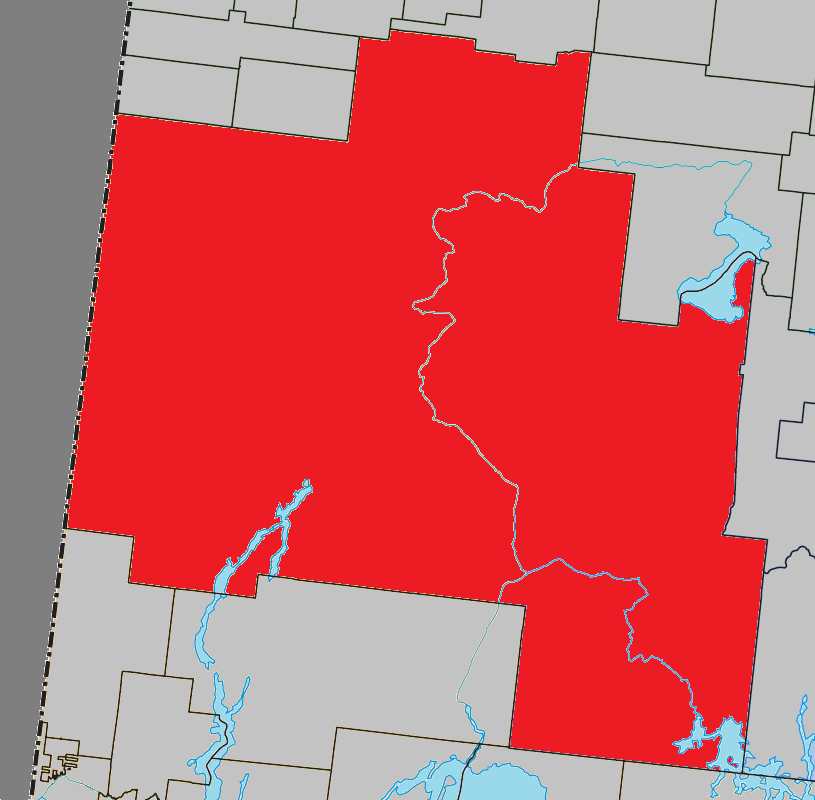
- Location with surrounding municipalities

- Location in western Quebec
- Coordinates: 48°14′N 79°01′W
- Country: Canada
- Province: Quebec
- Region: Abitibi-Témiscamingue
- RCM: None
- Founded: 1926
- Constituted: January 1, 2002

Government
  - Mayor: Gilles Chapadeau
  - Federal riding: Abitibi—Témiscamingue
  - Prov. riding: Abitibi-Est / Rouyn- Noranda–Témiscamingue

Area
  - City: 5,963.57 km^{2} (2,302.55 sq mi)
  - Urban: 24.15 km^{2} (9.32 sq mi)

Population (2021)
  - City: 42,313
  - Density: 7.1/km^{2} (18/sq mi)
  - Urban: 25,515
  - Urban density: 1,056.5/km^{2} (2,736/sq mi)
  - Change 2016-2021: ▼0.0%
  - Dwellings: 18,851
- Time zone: UTC−05:00 (EST)
  - Summer (DST): UTC−04:00 (EDT)
- Postal code(s): J9X, J9Y
- Area codes: 819/873
- Highways: R-101; R-117 (TCH); R-391; R-393
- Website: www.ville. rouyn-noranda.qc.ca

Rouyn-Noranda (French pronunciation: [ʁwɛ̃ nɔʁɑ̃da]; 2021 population 42,313) is a city on Osisko Lake in the Abitibi-Témiscamingue region of Quebec, Canada.

The city of Rouyn-Noranda is coextensive with a territory equivalent to a regional county municipality (TE) and census division (CD) of Quebec of the same name. Their geographical code is 86.

== History ==
City Hall

The city of Rouyn (named for Jean-Baptiste Rouyn, a captain in the Régiment Royal Roussillon of Louis-Joseph de Montcalm) appeared after copper was discovered in 1917. Noranda (a contraction of "North Canada") was created later around the Horne mine and foundry. Both were officially constituted as cities in 1926, then merged in 1986.

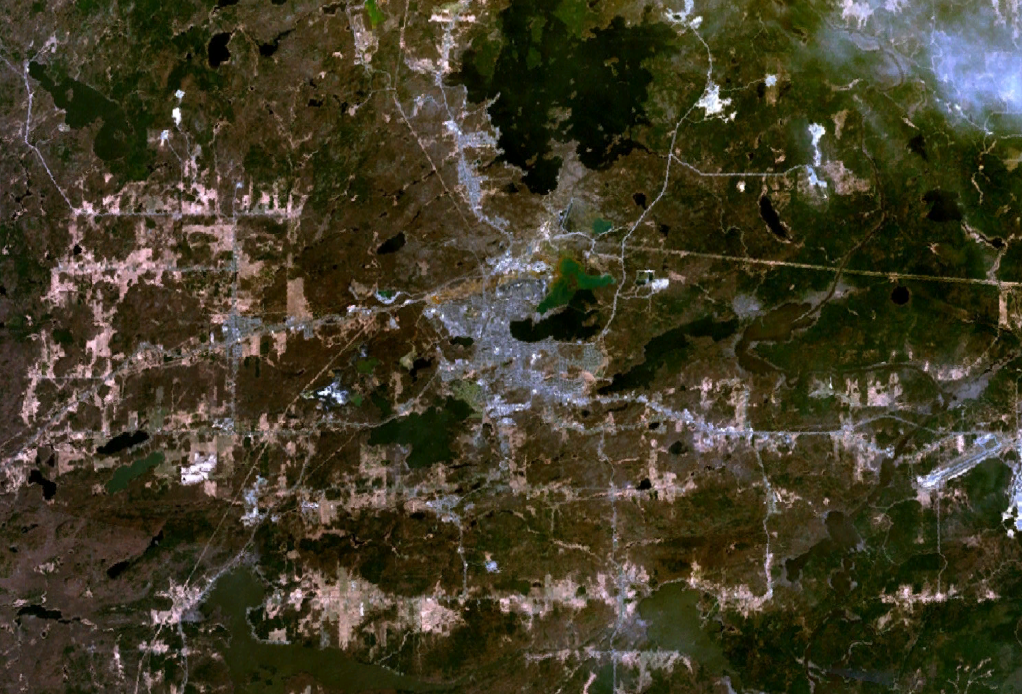
Rouyn Noranda seen from space

Since 1966, Rouyn and Noranda constitute the capital of the Abitibi-Témiscamingue region. It is also the seat of Université du Québec en Abitibi-Témiscamingue (UQAT) since 1983.

The population tends to increase or decrease dramatically depending on the economic situation. The city's population dropped by 5 per cent between the 1996 and 2001 census, before increasing slightly by 0.8 per cent for the 2006 census. This more closely parallels the demographic patterns of Northern Ontario than those of Quebec during this period. Rouyn-Noranda also has other cultural affiliations with Northern Ontario, being the only municipality in Quebec that holds a membership in the Francophone Association of Municipalities of Ontario.

The Roman Catholic Diocese of Rouyn-Noranda was established on February 9, 1974, by Pope Paul VI, with Mgr. Jean-Guy Hamelin as its first bishop. It is part of the Metropolitan Province of Gatineau. Mgr. Dorylas Moreau was appointed as bishop on November 30, 2001, replacing Mgr. Hamelin. On September 15, 2003, a decree moved the cathedral from Saint-Michel-Archange Church to Saint-Joseph Church.

== Geography ==
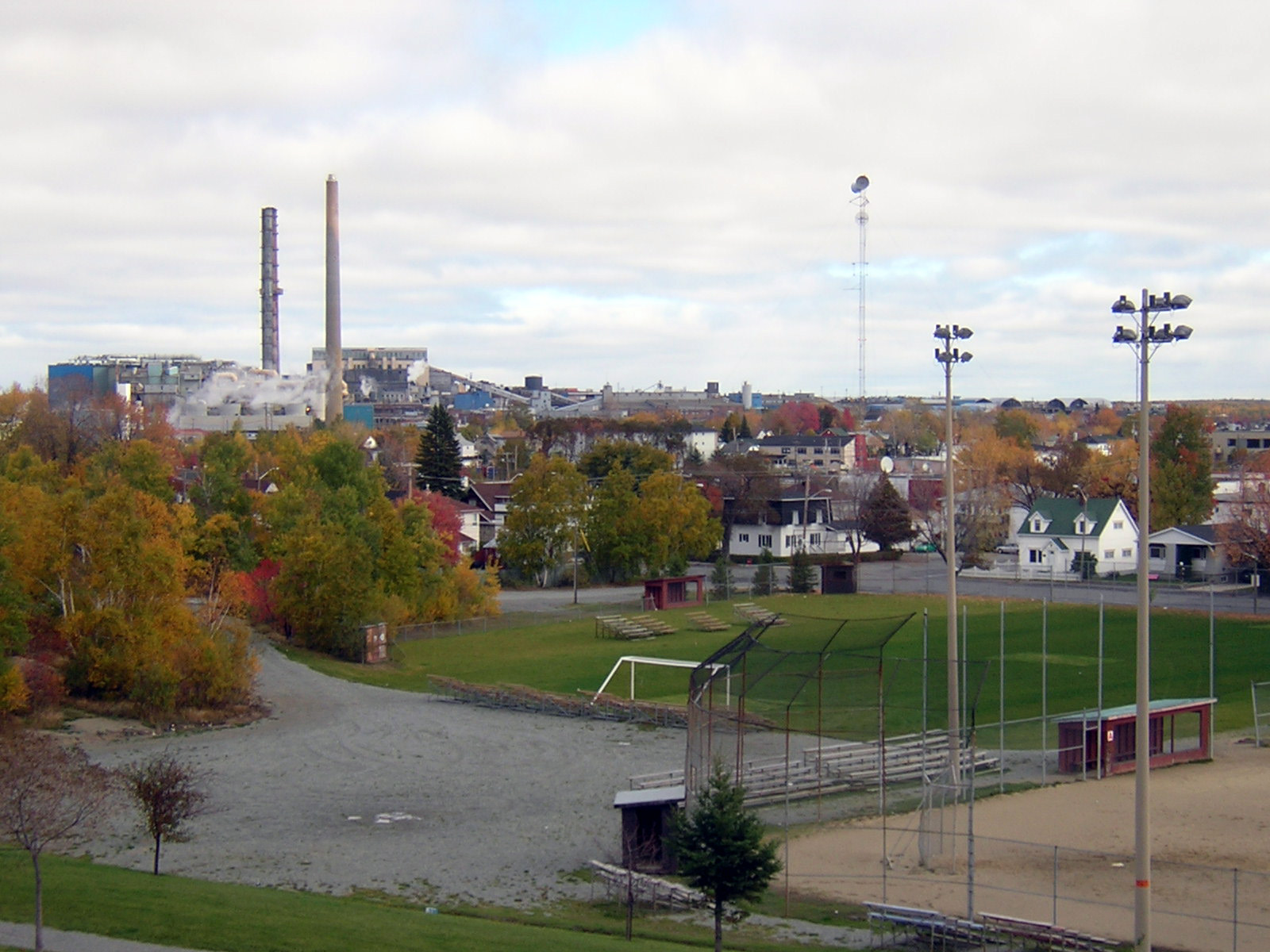
The Horne foundry seen from Chadbourne hill

As part of the 2000–2006 municipal reorganization in Quebec, on January 1, 2002, the municipalities (including unorganized territories) of the former Rouyn-Noranda Regional County Municipality amalgamated into the new City of Rouyn-Noranda. These were: Arntfield, Bellecombe, Beaudry, Cadillac, Cléricy, Cloutier, D'Alembert, Destor, Évain, Lac-Montanier, Lac-Surimau, McWatters, Mont-Brun, Montbeillard, Rapides-des-Cèdres, Rollet, and the former Rouyn-Noranda.

=== Climate ===
Rouyn-Noranda has a humid continental climate (Köppen: Dfb).

Climate data for Rouyn-Noranda
| Month | Jan | Feb | Mar | Apr | May | Jun | Jul | Aug | Sep | Oct | Nov | Dec | Year |
|---|---|---|---|---|---|---|---|---|---|---|---|---|---|
| Mean daily maximum °C (°F) | −10.1 (13.8) | −8.1 (17.4) | −1.1 (30.0) | 6.6 (43.9) | 15.8 (60.4) | 21.0 (69.8) | 23.3 (73.9) | 21.9 (71.4) | 17.6 (63.7) | 9.4 (48.9) | 1.1 (34.0) | −6.4 (20.5) | 7.6 (45.6) |
| Daily mean °C (°F) | −14.4 (6.1) | −13.1 (8.4) | −6.4 (20.5) | 1.5 (34.7) | 10.3 (50.5) | 15.8 (60.4) | 18.3 (64.9) | 16.9 (62.4) | 12.5 (54.5) | 5.5 (41.9) | −1.9 (28.6) | −10.0 (14.0) | 2.9 (37.2) |
| Mean daily minimum °C (°F) | −19.2 (−2.6) | −18.5 (−1.3) | −12.1 (10.2) | −3.5 (25.7) | 4.3 (39.7) | 9.8 (49.6) | 12.8 (55.0) | 12.0 (53.6) | 8.0 (46.4) | 2.0 (35.6) | −5.2 (22.6) | −14.0 (6.8) | −2.0 (28.4) |
| Average precipitation mm (inches) | 50.2 (1.98) | 46.9 (1.85) | 51.8 (2.04) | 60.2 (2.37) | 55.8 (2.20) | 68.9 (2.71) | 84.1 (3.31) | 73.3 (2.89) | 79.8 (3.14) | 72.0 (2.83) | 71.2 (2.80) | 63.7 (2.51) | 777.9 (30.63) |
Source: Weather.Directory

== Demographics ==
In the 2021 Census of Population conducted by Statistics Canada, Rouyn-Noranda had a population of 42,313 living in 19,282 of its 20,874 total private dwellings, a change of −0% from its 2016 population of 42,334. With a land area of 5,963.57 km^{2} (2,302.55 sq mi), it had a population density of 7.1/km^{2} (18.4/sq mi) in 2021.

Canada census – Rouyn-Noranda community profile

| | 2021 | 2016 | 2011 |
| Population | 42,313 (+0.0% from 2016) | 42,334 (+3.2% from 2011) | 41,012 (+2.7% from 2006) |
| Land area | 5,963.57 km^{2} (2,302.55 sq mi) | 6,010.50 km^{2} (2,320.67 sq mi) | 6,010.50 km^{2} (2,320.67 sq mi) |
| Population density | 7.1/km^{2} (18/sq mi) | 7.0/km^{2} (18/sq mi) | 6.8/km^{2} (18/sq mi) |
| Median age | 42 (M: 40.8, F: 43.2) | 41.9 (M: 40.8, F: 43.2) | 41.6 (M: 40.7, F: 42.5) |
| Private dwellings | 19,280 (total) | 18,851 (total) | 19,224 (total) |
| Median household income | $76,000 | $62,994 | $54,132 |

References: 2021 2016 2011

Historical Census Data - Rouyn-Noranda, Quebec
| Year | Pop. | ±% |
|---|---|---|
| 1991 | 28,958 | — |
| 1996 | 28,819 | −0.5% |
| 2001 | 28,270 | −1.9% |
| 2006 | 39,924 | +41.2% |
| 2011 | 41,012 | +2.7% |
| 2016 | 42,334 | +3.2% |
| 2021 | 42,313 | −0.0% |

Native French speakers comprise about 95% of the city's population.

Canada Census Mother Tongue - Rouyn-Noranda, Quebec
| Census | Total | French | | | English | | | French & English | | | Other | | |
| Year | Responses | Count | Trend | Pop % | Count | Trend | Pop % | Count | Trend | Pop % | Count | Trend | Pop % |
| 2021 | 41,935 | 39,975 | ▼0.9% | 95.3% | 750 | ▼7.4% | 1.8% | 385 | ▲32.8% | 0.9% | 675 | ▲26.2% | 1.6% |
| 2016 | 42,085 | 40,355 | ▲4.1% | 95.9% | 810 | ▼3.1% | 1.9% | 290 | ▲18.4% | 0.7% | 535 | ▲21.5% | 1.3% |
| 2011 | 40,200 | 38,700 | ▲1.9% | 96.3% | 835 | ▲15.2% | 2.1% | 245 | 0.0% | 0.6% | 420 | ▼11.6% | 1.0% |
| 2006 | 39,435 | 37,990 | ▲41.8% | 96.3% | 725 | ▼2.0% | 1.8% | 245 | ▲40.0% | 0.6% | 475 | ▲111.1% | 1.2% |
| 2001 | 27,930 | 26,790 | ▼0.1% | 95.9% | 740 | ▼28.2% | 2.7% | 175 | ▼39.7% | 0.6% | 225 | ▼33.8% | 0.8% |
| 1996 | 28,490 | 26,830 | n/a | 94.2% | 1,030 | n/a | 3.6% | 290 | n/a | 1.0% | 340 | n/a | 1.2% |

First language of Rouyn-Noranda's Citizens (2021)
| Language | Population | Percentage (%) |
|---|---|---|
| French | 39,975 | 95.3% |
| English | 750 | 1.8% |
| Both English and French | 385 | 0.9% |
| French and a non-official language | 115 | 0.3% |
| Arabic | 210 | 0.5% |
| Spanish | 130 | 0.3% |

== Economy ==
The unemployment rate of the region was 6.6% in 2016.

Propair has its headquarters on the property of Rouyn-Noranda Airport.

Glencore Copper Canada currently operates the Horne Smelter. The smelter is the world's largest processor of electronic scrap containing copper and precious metals. It opened in 1927 at the site of the Horne copper mine. The mine was closed in 1976, but the smelter remained in production.

Université du Québec en Abitibi-Témiscamingue is based in Rouyn-Noranda, with campuses elsewhere such as Val-d'Or.

== Arts and culture ==
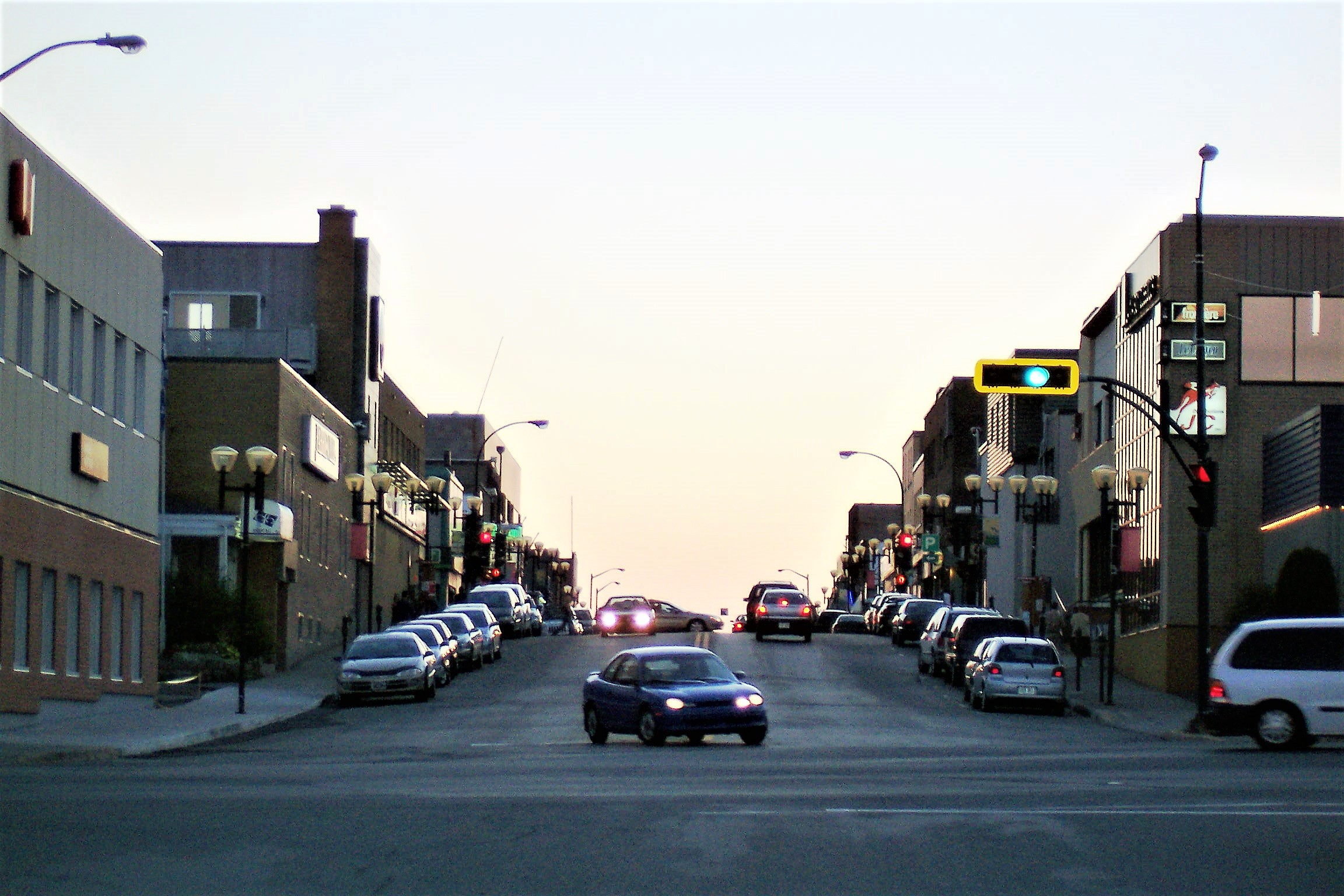
A street corner in Downtown Rouyn-Noranda

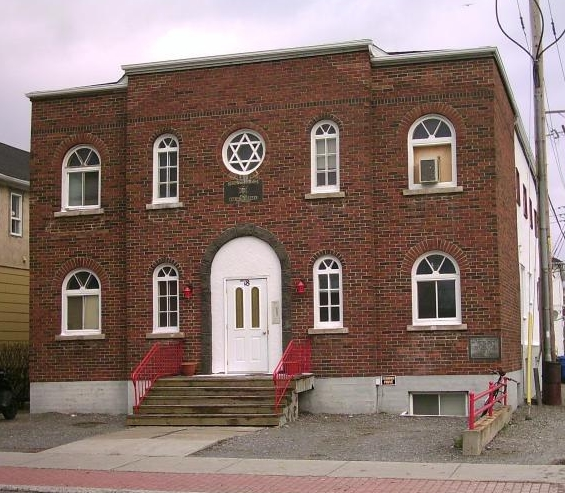
Rouyn-Noranda Synagogue

Since 1982, the city has been host to the International Cinema Festival of Abitibi-Témiscamingue and since 2003, the host of the Emerging Music Festival in Abitibi-Témiscamingue.

Notable cultural figures from Rouyn-Noranda include singer-songwriter Richard Desjardins, actors Paule Baillargeon, Anne Dorval and Bruce Greenwood, and science fiction writer Éric Gauthier.

Rouyn-Noranda is known as "La Capitale Nationale du Cuivre" (or the National Copper Capital) for its extensive copper deposits and mining/smelting activities.

== Attractions ==
St. George Russian Orthodox Church of Rouyn is a Russian Orthodox Church, with traditional architecture. It was erected between 1955 and 1957 by the Russian community, at the time about twenty families. A guided tour explains the celebration of Mass and the history of immigrant communities and their role in local history. This distinctive church paints a vivid picture of the lives of the people who suffered through the First and Second World Wars and finally came to live in Canada.

== Sports ==
The Rouyn-Noranda Huskies have played in the Quebec Maritimes Junior Hockey League since the Saint-Hyacinthe Laser relocated to the town in 1996. Rouyn-Noranda has produced a large number of NHLers for its size including former NHL stars Pierre Turgeon, Stephane Matteau, Sylvain Turgeon, Dale Tallon, Pit Martin, Jacques Laperrière, Jacques Cloutier, Dave Keon and Kent Douglas, the last two both members of the 1967 Stanley Cup Champion Toronto Maple Leafs. Former NHL players Réjean Houle, Éric Desjardins and the Bordeleau Brothers (Christian, Jean Paul and Paulin) also hail from the city. Rouyn-Noranda native Marc-André Cliche played in his first NHL game in 2010. Their most fierce rivals are the Val-d'Or Foreurs, which constitute the "Battle of the 117" since both cities are connected by Route 117.

== Government ==
Federally, Rouyn-Noranda is part of the Abitibi—Témiscamingue riding. The MP is Sébastien Lemire of the Bloc Québécois.

Provincially, Rouyn-Noranda is part of the Rouyn-Noranda–Témiscamingue riding and the Abitibi-Est riding. The MNAs are Daniel Bernard and Pierre Dufour of the Coalition Avenir Québec.

The city's mayor is Gilles Chapadeau.

Rouyn-Noranda is also a territory equivalent to a regional county municipality (TE) and census division (CD) of Quebec, coextensive with the city of Rouyn-Noranda. Its geographical code is 86.

Rouyn-Noranda is the seat of the judicial district of the same name.

== Infrastructure ==
The city is served by the Rouyn-Noranda Airport and has a small public transit system of four bus routes serving the urban area.

The primary highways through the city are the north–south Route 101 and the east–west Route 117, which is part of the Trans-Canada Highway system.

== Education ==
=== University ===
The Université du Québec en Abitibi-Témiscamingue (UQAT) began in 1970 in premises loaned by the Cégep as an extension of the Université du Québec à Trois-Rivières (UQTR), before obtaining its letters patent in 1983. Based at the Séminaire St-Michel, it moved into a new building with original architecture in 1996. It offers training in several fields, including education, civil engineering, multimedia creation, administration, social work and health at its three campuses in Rouyn-Noranda, Val-d'Or and Amos and at several other centres in Abitibi-Témiscamingue, as well as in Mont-Laurier and at the École de Technologie supérieure de Montréal, where it offers several programmes in multimedia creation. It also has two research institutes (mining and environment, forestry) and an agricultural research centre at Notre-Dame-du-Nord in Témiscamingue.

=== College ===
The Cégep de l'Abitibi-Témiscamingue (CEGEPAT), founded in 1967, serves an area of 65,143 km2, with its three regular education campuses in Rouyn-Noranda, Amos and Val-d'Or, and the continuing education centres in Ville-Marie and La Sarre.

=== Secondary ===
French High school education is provided in four public schools, École de la Grande-Ourse, École La Source, École Sacré-Coeur and École d'Iberville.

English High school education is provided in Noranda School.

=== English language education ===
Currently, English-language public education is provided by the Western Québec School Board.

== Media ==
Almost all media in Rouyn-Noranda and the nearby city of Val-d'Or serves both cities. Although the cities are far enough apart that radio and television stations in the area serve the cities from separate transmitters, almost every broadcast station in either city has a rebroadcaster in the other city. The only nominal exceptions are the cities' separate Énergie stations, although at present even these stations share the majority of their broadcast schedule.

== Sister cities ==
Rouyn-Noranda has not yet established a twinning agreement with any city.

== Notable people ==
- Anodajay, rapper and music producer
- Philippe B, songwriter
- Paule Baillargeon, actress and director
- Denise Bellamy, judge
- Yves Beauchemin, writer
- Lise Bissonnette, journalist, writer and administrator
- Bob Blackburn, sport commentator
- Yves Blais, politician
- Luc Blanchette, economist and politician
- Christie Blatchford, journalist
- William Brenton Boggs, pioneer of military and commercial aviation.
- Christian Bordeleau, hockey player
- Jean-Pierre Bordeleau, hockey player
- Paulin Bordeleau, hockey player
- Marc Bureau, politician
- Armand Caouette, politician and trade representative
- Gilles Caouette, politician
- Gilles Carle, director, screenwriter and painter
- Jacques Caron, hockey player and coach
- Marc-André Cliche, hockey player
- Jacques Cloutier, hockey player
- Roland Cloutier, hockey player
- Wayne Connelly, hockey player
- Jacques Cossette, hockey player
- Éric Desjardins, hockey player
- Richard Desjardins, songwriter and director
- Anne Dorval, actress
- Francis Ducharme, actor and dancer
- Yvan Ducharme, actor and humorist
- Salvat Etchart, writer
- John Emilius Fauquier, World War II aviator
- Antonio Flamand, politician
- Allan Furlong, politician
- Cathy Gauthier, humorist
- Éric Gauthier, writer
- Christine Girard, weightlifter
- Jim Gordon, mayor of Sudbury
- Bruce Greenwood, actor and producer
- Annie Guay, hockey player
- Chris Hayes, hockey player
- Réjean Houle, hockey player
- Peter Jensen, sport psychologist
- Denyse Julien, badminton player
- Dave Keon, hockey player
- Abraham Moses Klein, poet and writer
- Gina Kingsbury, hockey player
- Jacques Laperrière, hockey player
- Nil-Élie Larivière, politician
- Paul Larose, hockey player
- Steve Larouche, hockey player
- Marc Lemay, politician and lawyer
- Jean Lemieux, hockey player
- Jean-Louis Levasseur, hockey player
- Pit Martin, hockey player
- Stéphane Matteau, hockey player
- André Melançon, actor, screenwriter and director
- Jacques Michel, musician
- Johanne Morasse, politician
- Keke Mortson, hockey player
- Ted Ouimet, hockey player
- Gilles Perron, politician
- Valérie Plante, mayor of Montreal
- André Racicot, hockey player
- Aglaé René De Cotret, hockey player
- Gildor Roy, actor and country singer
- Jocelyne Saucier, author
- Bob Sullivan, hockey player
- Dale Tallon, hockey player
- Pierre Turgeon, hockey player
- Sylvain Turgeon, hockey player
- John C. Turmel, politician
- Rémy Trudel, politician
- Hal Willis, country singer

== See also ==
- List of regional county municipalities and equivalent territories in Quebec
- Category:People from Rouyn-Noranda
- Category:Sportspeople from Rouyn-Noranda

== References and notes ==
=== Sources ===
- Gourd, Benoit-Beaudry. "Rouyn-Noranda", in The Canadian Encyclopedia, Volume 3. Edmonton: Hurtig Publishing, 1988.
