= Diane Dallaire =

Diane Dallaire MNA
- Dallaire in 2021

Member of the National Assembly for Rouyn-Noranda–Témiscamingue
- Incumbent
- Assumed office October 5, 2026
- Preceded by: Daniel Bernard

Mayor of Rouyn-Noranda
- In office November 5, 2017 – November 2, 2025
- Preceded by: Mario Provencher
- Succeeded by: Gilles Chapadeau

Personal details
- Born: December 8, 1959 (age 66) Rouyn-Noranda, Quebec, Canada
- Party: Parti Québécois

Diane Dallaire is a Canadian politician who is Member of the National Assembly of Quebec for Rouyn-Noranda–Témiscamingue as a member of the Parti Québécois. She was the mayor of Rouyn-Noranda from 2017 to 2025.

== Electoral record ==
2026 Quebec general election: Rouyn-Noranda–Témiscamingue
** Preliminary results — Not yet official **
Party	Candidate	Votes	%	±%
Parti Québécois	Diane Dallaire	10,251	36.62	
Coalition Avenir Québec	Béatrice Déry	5,238	18.71	
Conservative	Francis Lapointe	5,121	18.29	
Québec solidaire	France Marion	3,952	14.12	
Liberal	Leanne Loney	3,176	11.35	
Parti nul	Samuel Touchette	256	0.91	
Total valid votes				
Total rejected ballots				
Turnout			63.87	
Parti Québécois gain from Coalition Avenir Québec		Swing		+20
Source: Élections Québec
