= Peter Jensen =

Peter Jensen may refer to:

== Sports ==
- Peter Jensen (psychologist) (born 1946), Canadian Olympic trainer and sports psychologist
- Peter Aagaard Jensen (born 1956), Danish sport shooter
- Peter Skov-Jensen (born 1971), Danish football player
- Peter Friis Jensen (born 1988), Danish professional football goalkeeper
- Peter Vindahl Jensen (born 1998), Danish footballer

== Other ==
- Peter Jensen (orientalist) (1861–1936), professor and German orientalist
- Peter L. Jensen (1886–1961), inventor of the first loudspeaker
- Peter Herbert Jensen (1913–1955), German physicist
- Kris Jensen (Peter Kristian Jensen, 1942), American pop musician
- Peter Jensen (bishop) (born 1943), Anglican Archbishop of Sydney, Australia
- Peter Aalbæk Jensen (born 1956), Danish film producer
- Peter Jensen (fashion designer) (born 1969), fashion designer
- Peter Boysen Jensen (1883–1959), Danish plant physiologist

== See also ==
- Peder Jensen (disambiguation)
