= Gilles Baril (Liberal) =

Canadian politician

Member of the National Assembly of Quebec for Rouyn-Noranda–Témiscamingue
- In office 1985–1989
- Preceded by: Gilles Baril
- Succeeded by: Rémy Trudel

Personal details
- Born: 8 December 1940 (age 85) Duparquet, Quebec
- Party: Liberal

Gilles Baril (born 8 December 1940) was a politician in Quebec, Canada and a Liberal member of the National Assembly of Quebec (MNA).

He was born in Duparquet, Quebec on 8 December 1940.

Baril defeated his namesake incumbent Gilles Baril in the 1985 Quebec election and became the Quebec Liberal Party Member of the National Assembly for the district of Rouyn-Noranda–Témiscamingue. He was narrowly defeated in the 1989 election, by a margin of only 66 votes.

He was a board member of the SAAQ from 1990 to 1993. He was a member of the Commission des Transports du Québec from 1993 to 1998.
