= Daniel Bernard (politician) =

Canadian politician

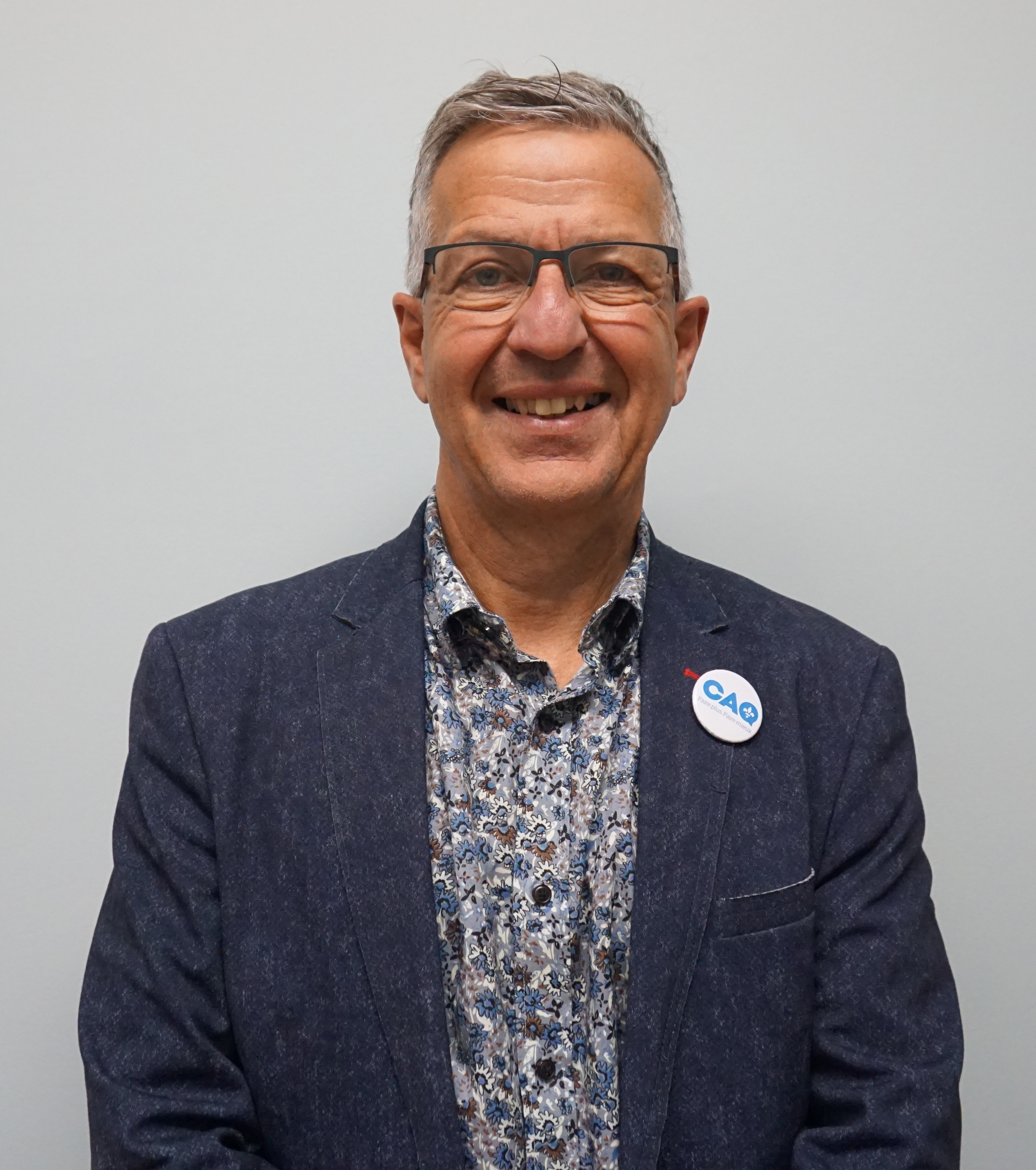
- Bernard in 2022

Member of the Legislative Assembly of Quebec for Rouyn-Noranda–Témiscamingue
- In office October 3, 2022 – August 27, 2026
- Preceded by: Émilise Lessard-Therrien
- Succeeded by: Diane Dallaire
- In office December 8, 2008 – September 4, 2012
- Preceded by: Johanne Morasse
- Succeeded by: Gilles Chapadeau
- In office April 14, 2003 – March 26, 2007
- Preceded by: Rémy Trudel
- Succeeded by: Johanne Morasse

Personal details
- Born: July 28, 1959 (age 67) Disraeli, Quebec
- Party: Coalition Avenir Québec
- Other political affiliations: Quebec Liberal Party (2003-2012)

Daniel Bernard (born July 28, 1959) is a Canadian politician, who served three non-consecutive terms as a member of the National Assembly for the electoral district of Rouyn-Noranda–Témiscamingue. First elected as a member of the Quebec Liberal Party in the 2003 Quebec general election, he served until he was defeated by Johanne Morasse of the Parti Québécois in the 2007 Quebec general election; he was then re-elected in the same district, defeating Morasse, in the 2008 Quebec general election, serving a single term and not running for re-election in the 2012 Quebec general election. In the 2022 Quebec general election, he was re-elected to the legislature as a member of the Coalition Avenir Québec.

== Biography ==
Bernard is an alumnus of the Université Laval and the Université du Québec à Montréal. At Laval, he obtained a bachelor's degree in sciences and geology in 1982 and a master's degree in structural geology in 1987. At the UQAM he received an MBA in 2000.

Bernard worked as a project engineer for the SOQUEM from 1992 to 1994, at Barrick Gold from 1994 to 1997 and Inmet Mines from 1997 to 1999. From 1999 to his election in 2003 he held managing duties at Pershimco Mining, the Quebec Mining Exploitation Association and 3E Consultant Firm in Rouyn-Noranda as well as Globex Mining Company between his two terms in 2007–08.

Bernard was briefly the Parliamentary Assistant to the Minister of Agriculture, Fisheries and Food in 2007.

He briefly sat on Rouyn-Noranda City Council, having been elected in the 2021 municipal election before being elected back to the National Assembly in 2022.

He did not seek re-election in the 2026 general election.

== Electoral record ==
=== Provincial ===
2022 Quebec general election: Rouyn-Noranda–Témiscamingue
Party	Candidate	Votes	%	±%
Coalition Avenir Québec	Daniel Bernard	12,975	45.16	+14.82
Québec solidaire	Émilise Lessard-Therrien	8,890	30.94	-1.14
Parti Québécois	Jean-François Vachon	3,232	11.25	-7.06
Conservative	Robert Daigle	2,202	7.66	+6.79
Liberal	Arnaud Warolin	1,255	4.37	-12.02
Green	Chantal Corswarem	178	0.62	-0.72
Total valid votes		28,732	98.93	–
Total rejected ballots		310	1.07	-0.29
Turnout		29,042	64.91	-0.69
Electors on the lists		44,742	–	–
Coalition Avenir Québec gain from Québec solidaire		Swing		+7.98

2008 Quebec general election
Party	Candidate	Votes	%	±%
Liberal	Daniel Bernard	10,358	42.30	+9.64
Parti Québécois	Johanne Morasse	8,604	35.14	+2.03
Action démocratique	Paul-Émile Barbeau	4,111	16.79	-10.05
Québec solidaire	Guy Leclerc	1,413	5.78	-1.61

2007 Quebec general election
Party	Candidate	Votes	%	±%
Parti Québécois	Johanne Morasse	9,481	33.11	
Liberal	Daniel Bernard	9,352	32.66	
Action démocratique	Mario Provencher	7,687	26.84	
Québec solidaire	France Caouette	2,117	7.39	
