= Quebec Route 388 =

Highway in Quebec, Canada

Route 388

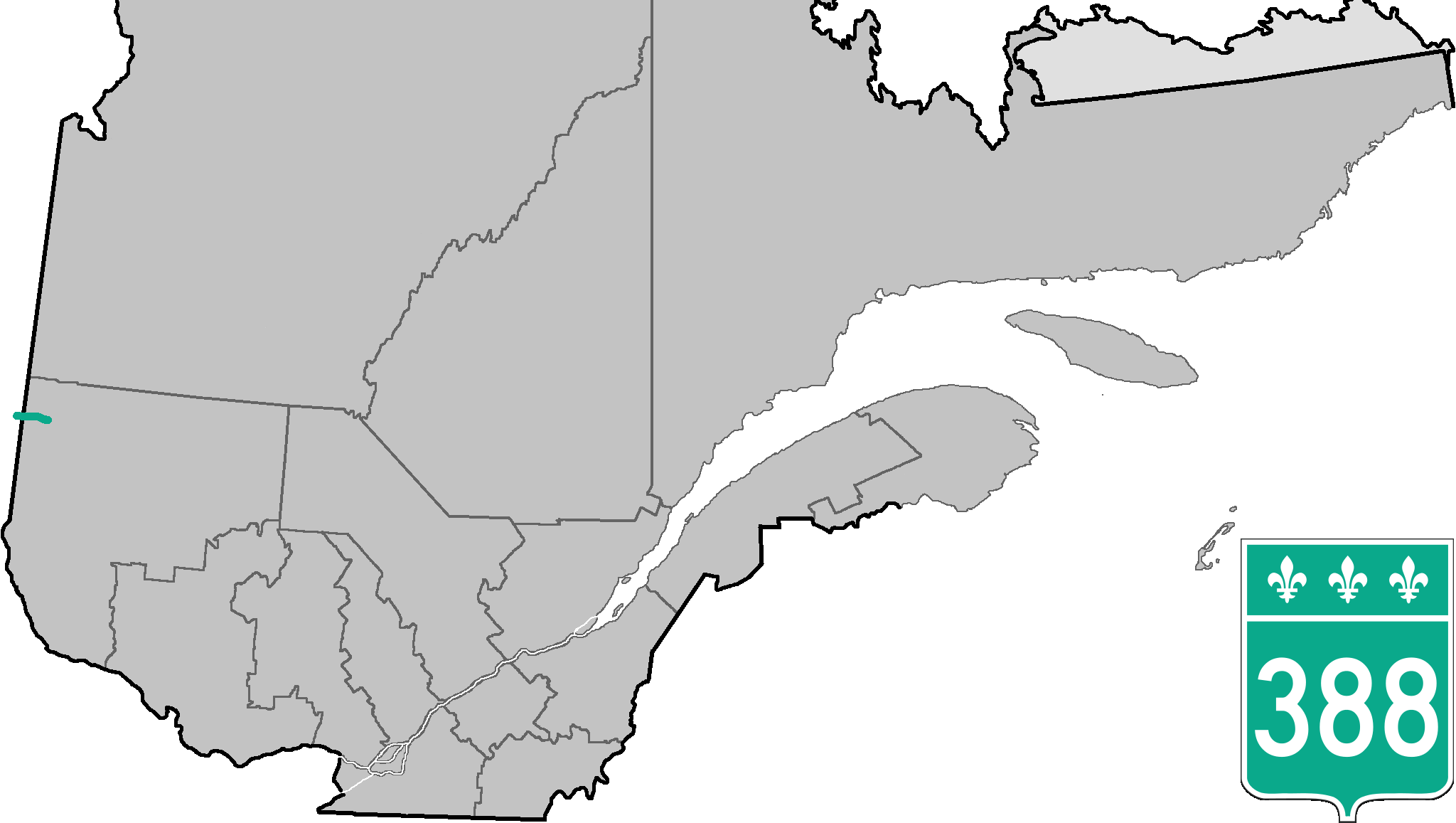

Route information
- Maintained by Transports Québec
- Length: 25 km (16 mi)

Major junctions
- West end: Highway 101 at the Quebec–Ontario border
- East end: R-393 near Duparquet

Location
- Country: Canada
- Province: Quebec

Highway system
- Quebec provincial highways; Autoroutes; List; Former
← R-386	→ R-389

Route 388 is a short provincial highway in the Abitibi-Témiscamingue region of the Canadian province of Quebec.

Approximately 25 kilometres long, the highway is located in the Abitibi-Ouest MRC. It is essentially a continuation of Highway 101 in Ontario, extending from the provincial border to Route 393 just outside Duparquet.

== Towns along Route 388 ==
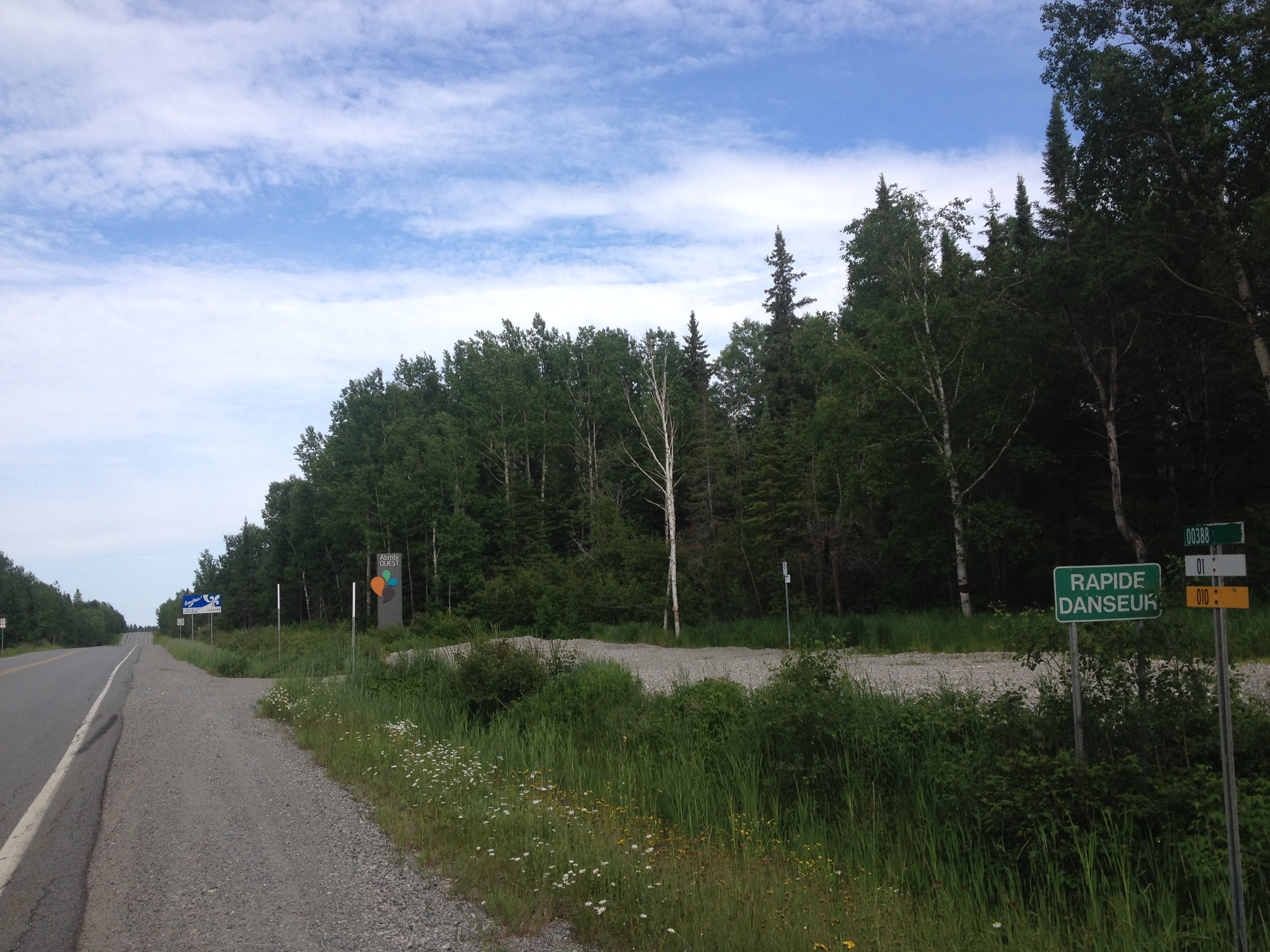
Route 388 at the junction with Ontario Highway 101

- Rapide-Danseur

== See also ==
- List of Quebec provincial highways
