= Rouyn-Noranda–Témiscamingue =

Provincial electoral district in Quebec, Canada

Coordinates: 47.05°N 78.29°W

Quebec electoral district

Provincial electoral district
- Legislature: National Assembly of Quebec
MNA
Diane Dallaire
Parti Québécois
- District created: 1980
- First contested: 1981
- Last contested: 2026

Demographics
- Electors (2014): 44,587
- Area (km²): 23,744.6
- Census division(s): Rouyn-Noranda (part), Témiscamingue (all)
- Census subdivision(s): Rouyn-Noranda (part), Béarn, Belleterre, Duhamel-Ouest, Fugèreville, Guérin, Kipawa, Laforce, Latulipe-et-Gaboury, Laverlochère-Angliers, Lorrainville, Moffet, Nédélec, Notre-Dame-du-Nord, Rémigny, Saint-Bruno-de-Guigues, Saint-Édouard-de-Fabre, Saint-Eugène-de-Guigues, Témiscaming, Ville-Marie; Kebaowek, Timiskaming First Nation; Hunter's Point, Winneway; Laniel, Les Lacs-du-Témiscamingue

Rouyn-Noranda–Témiscamingue (French pronunciation: [ʁwɛ̃ nɔʁɑ̃da temiskamɛ̃ɡ]) is a provincial electoral district in the Abitibi-Témiscamingue region of Quebec, Canada, which elects members to the National Assembly of Quebec. It notably includes large portions of the city of Rouyn-Noranda as well as the cities or municipalities of Ville-Marie, Témiscaming, Lorrainville, Saint-Bruno-de-Guigues, Notre-Dame-du-Nord and Laverlochère-Angliers. No incumbent since Rémy Trudel (who won re-election in 1998) has won re-election in the riding.

It was created for the 1981 election from parts of Rouyn-Noranda, Gatineau and Pontiac-Témiscamingue electoral districts.

In the change from the 2001 to the 2011 electoral map, its territory was unchanged.

== Members of the National Assembly ==
Legislature	Years	Member	Party
Riding created from Rouyn-Noranda, Gatineau and Pontiac-Témiscamingue
32nd	1981–1985	Gilles Baril *	Parti Québécois
33rd	1985–1989	Gilles Baril *	Liberal
34th	1989–1994	Rémy Trudel	Parti Québécois
35th	1994–1998	Rémy Trudel	Parti Québécois
36th	1998–2003	Rémy Trudel	Parti Québécois
37th	2003–2007	Daniel Bernard	Liberal
38th	2007–2008	Johanne Morasse	Parti Québécois
39th	2008–2012	Daniel Bernard	Liberal
40th	2012–2014	Gilles Chapadeau	Parti Québécois
41st	2014–2018	Luc Blanchette	Liberal
42nd	2018–2022	Émilise Lessard-Therrien	Québec solidaire
43rd	2022–2026	Daniel Bernard	Coalition Avenir Québec
44th	2026–Present	Diane Dallaire	Parti Québécois

* These are two different people with the same name

== Election results ==
2026 Quebec general election
** Preliminary results — Not yet official **
Party	Candidate	Votes	%	±%
Parti Québécois	Diane Dallaire	10,251	36.62	
Coalition Avenir Québec	Béatrice Déry	5,238	18.71	
Conservative	Francis Lapointe	5,121	18.29	
Québec solidaire	France Marion	3,952	14.12	
Liberal	Leanne Loney	3,176	11.35	
Parti nul	Samuel Touchette	256	0.91	
Total valid votes				
Total rejected ballots				
Turnout			63.87	
Parti Québécois gain from Coalition Avenir Québec		Swing		+20
Source: Élections Québec

2022 Quebec general election
Party	Candidate	Votes	%	±%
Coalition Avenir Québec	Daniel Bernard	12,975	45.16	+14.82
Québec solidaire	Émilise Lessard-Therrien	8,890	30.94	-1.14
Parti Québécois	Jean-François Vachon	3,232	11.25	-7.06
Conservative	Robert Daigle	2,202	7.66	+6.79
Liberal	Arnaud Warolin	1,255	4.37	-12.02
Green	Chantal Corswarem	178	0.62	-0.72
Total valid votes		28,732	98.93	–
Total rejected ballots		310	1.07	-0.29
Turnout		29,042	64.91	-0.69
Electors on the lists		44,742	–	–
Coalition Avenir Québec gain from Québec solidaire		Swing		+7.98

2018 Quebec general election
Party	Candidate	Votes	%	±%
Québec solidaire	Émilise Lessard-Therrien	9,304	32.08	+20.52
Coalition Avenir Québec	Jérémy G. Bélanger	8,798	30.33	+13.07
Parti Québécois	Gilles Chapadeau	5,311	18.31	-13.92
Liberal	Luc Blanchette	4,753	16.39	-21.59
Green	Jessica Wells	389	1.34	
Conservative	Guillaume Lanouette	253	0.87	
Citoyens au pouvoir	Fernand St-Georges	195	0.67	
Total valid votes		29,003	98.64	
Total rejected ballots		400	1.36	-0.81
Turnout		29,403	65.60	+1.35
Eligible voters		44,824		
Québec solidaire gain from Liberal		Swing		+21.06
Source(s) "Rapport des résultats officiels du scrutin". Élections Québec.

2014 Quebec general election
Party	Candidate	Votes	%	±%
Liberal	Luc Blanchette	10,644	37.98	+11.49
Parti Québécois	Gilles Chapadeau	9,034	32.24	-4.54
Coalition Avenir Québec	Bernard Flebus	4,839	17.27	-6.43
Québec solidaire	Guy Leclerc	3,239	11.56	+1.80
Option nationale	Ghislain Dallaire	269	0.96	-0.81
Total valid votes		28,025	97.83	–
Total rejected ballots		622	2.17	–
Turnout		28,647	64.25	-4.76
Electors on the lists		44,587	–	–
Liberal gain from Parti Québécois		Swing		

2012 Quebec general election
Party	Candidate	Votes	%	±%
Parti Québécois	Gilles Chapadeau	11,082	36.78	+1.64
Liberal	Melissa Turgeon	7,983	26.49	-15.81
Coalition Avenir Québec	Bernard Flebus	7,140	23.70	+6.91
Québec solidaire	Guy Leclerc	2,941	9.76	+3.99
Option nationale	Sébastien-L. Pageon	534	1.77	
Green	Robert Bertrand	451	1.50	
Total valid votes		30,131	98.82	–
Total rejected ballots		359	1.18	–
Turnout		30,490	69.01	
Electors on the lists		44,179	–	–
Parti Québécois gain from Liberal		Swing		+8.72

^ Change is from redistributed results. CAQ change is from ADQ.

2008 Quebec general election
Party	Candidate	Votes	%	±%
Liberal	Daniel Bernard	10,358	42.30	+9.64
Parti Québécois	Johanne Morasse	8,604	35.14	+2.03
Action démocratique	Paul-Émile Barbeau	4,111	16.79	-10.05
Québec solidaire	Guy Leclerc	1,413	5.78	-1.61

2007 Quebec general election
Party	Candidate	Votes	%	±%
Parti Québécois	Johanne Morasse	9,481	33.11	
Liberal	Daniel Bernard	9,352	32.66	
Action démocratique	Mario Provencher	7,687	26.84	
Québec solidaire	France Caouette	2,117	7.39	

== See also ==
- List of Quebec provincial electoral districts
- Canadian provincial electoral districts
