= Rapide-Danseur =

- Municipality
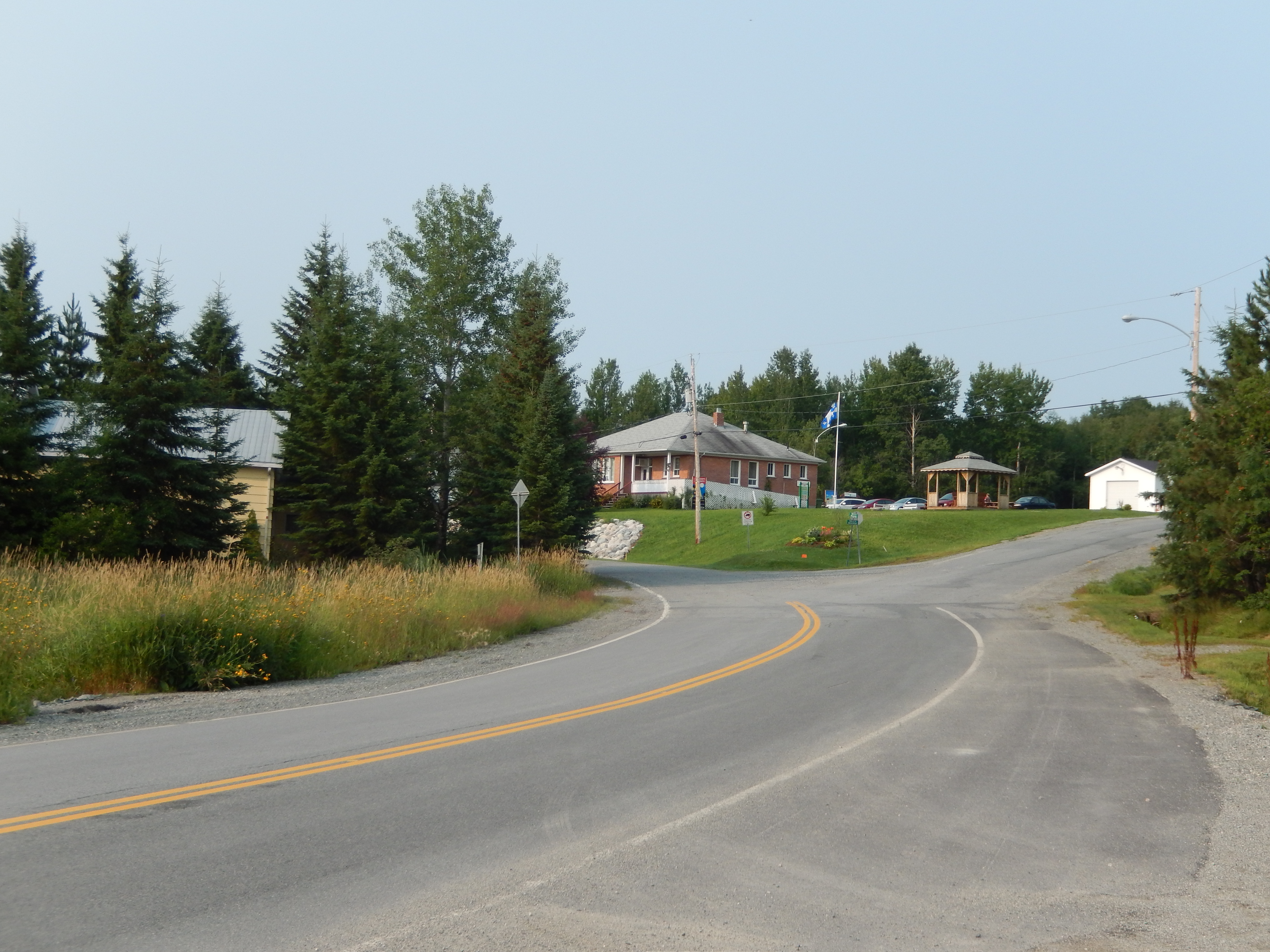

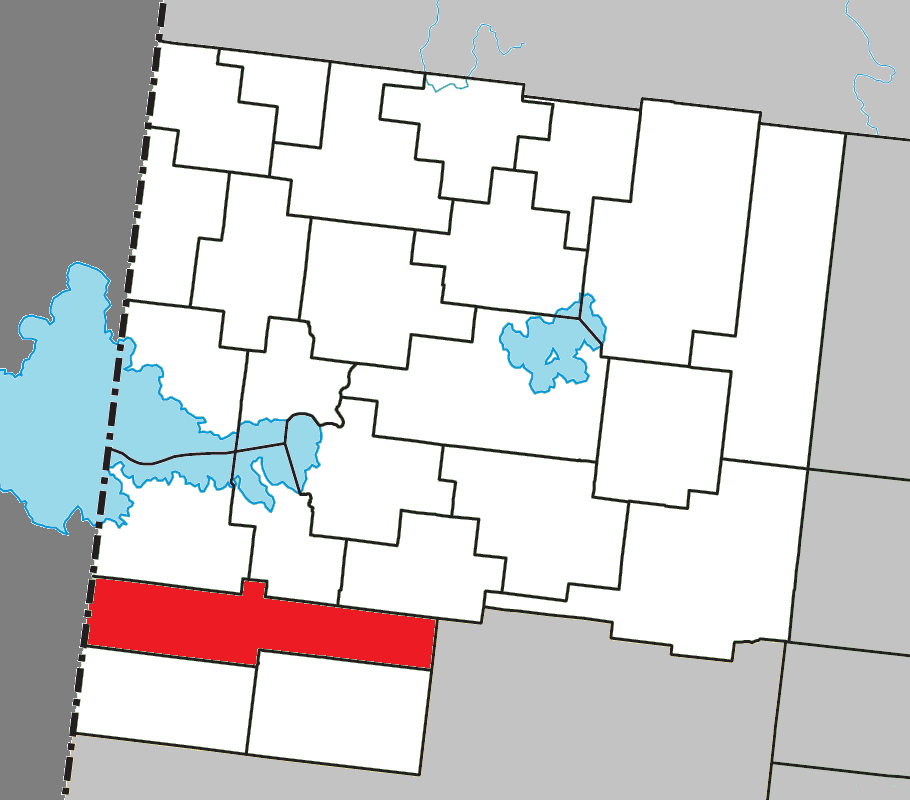
- Location within Abitibi-Ouest RCM

- Location in western Quebec
- Coordinates: 48°33′N 79°18′W
- Country: Canada
- Province: Quebec
- Region: Abitibi-Témiscamingue
- RCM: Abitibi-Ouest
- Settled: 1928
- Constituted: January 1, 1981

Government
  - Mayor: Alain Gagnon
  - Federal riding: Abitibi—Témiscamingue
  - Prov. riding: Abitibi-Ouest

Area
  - Total: 185.67 km^{2} (71.69 sq mi)
  - Land: 173.73 km^{2} (67.08 sq mi)

Population (2021)
  - Total: 380
  - Density: 2.2/km^{2} (5.7/sq mi)
  - Pop (2016-21): ▲15.9%
  - Dwellings: 209
- Time zone: UTC−5 (EST)
  - Summer (DST): UTC−4 (EDT)
- Postal code(s): J0Z 3G0
- Area code: 819
- Highways: R-388 R-393
- Website: rapide-danseur.ao.ca

Rapide-Danseur (French pronunciation: [ʁapid dɑ̃sœʁ]) is a municipality in northwestern Quebec, Canada, in the Abitibi-Ouest Regional County Municipality. It covers 173.73 km^{2} and had a population of 380 as of the 2021 Canadian census.

The municipality was incorporated on January 1, 1981. It owes its name to a waterfall found on the Duparquet River between Lake Duparquet and Lake Abitibi. The natives called it “opacicicimosik” which means “where we stop to dance, to stretch ourselves”, this after having done portage.

== Demographics ==
Canada census – Rapide-Danseur, Quebec community profile

	2021	2016	2011
Population	380 (+15.9% from 2016)	328 (+5.1% from 2011)	312 (+14.3% from 2006)
Land area	173.73 km^{2} (67.08 sq mi)	175.56 km^{2} (67.78 sq mi)	175.33 km^{2} (67.70 sq mi)
Population density	2.2/km^{2} (5.7/sq mi)	1.9/km^{2} (4.9/sq mi)	1.8/km^{2} (4.7/sq mi)
Median age	45.6 (M: 48.8, F: 40)	45.0 (M: 50.4, F: 41.5)	46.7 (M: 50.1, F: 44.5)
Private dwellings	209 (total)	195 (total)	162 (total)
Median household income	$77,500	$69,888	$.N/A

References: 2021 2016 2011

Historical Census Data - Rapide-Danseur, Quebec

Year	Pop.	±%
1981	246	—
1986	208	−15.4%
1991	206	−1.0%
1996	247	+19.9%
2001	265	+7.3%

Year	Pop.	±%
2006	273	+3.0%
2011	312	+14.3%
2016	328	+5.1%
2021	380	+15.9%

Source: Statistics Canada

Private dwellings occupied by usual residents (2021): 161 (total dwellings: 209)

Mother tongue (2021):

- English as first language: 1.3%
- French as first language: 98.7%
- English and French as first language: 0%
- Other as first language: 0%

== Government ==
Municipal council (2024):

- Mayor: Alain Gagnon
- Councillors: Donald Dubé, Lorraine Doucet-Dion, vacant, Marc Regaudie, Christiane Guillemette, Vanessa Gravel

=== Political representation ===
Rapide-Danseur federal election results
Year	Liberal		Conservative		Bloc Québécois		New Democratic		Green	
2021	19%	29	9%	14	55%	87	4%	7	4%	6
2019	19%	31	16%	26	53%	87	6%	10	5%	7
2015	24%	29	3%	4	26%	32	41%	51	4%	5
2011	4%	5	4%	5	37%	52	55%	78	1%	1
2008	21%	29	8%	11	52%	72	14%	20	4%	6
2006	8%	9	16%	19	57%	68	16%	19	4%	5
2004	23%	27	4%	5	62%	73	6%	7	5%	6

Rapide-Danseur provincial election results
Year	CAQ		Liberal		QC solidaire		Parti Québécois	
2022	24%	39	4%	7	18%	29	35%	56
2018	22%	45	9%	17	23%	47	42%	87
2014	18%	30	16%	27	15%	26	50%	86
2012	19%	29	12%	18	10%	16	56%	86

Provincially it is part of the riding of Abitibi-Ouest. In the 2022 Quebec general election the incumbent MNA Suzanne Blais, of the Coalition Avenir Québec, was re-elected to represent the population of Rapide-Danseur in the National Assembly of Quebec.

Federally, Rapide-Danseur is part of the federal riding of Abitibi—Témiscamingue. In the 2021 Canadian federal election, the incumbent Sébastien Lemire of the Bloc Québécois was re-elected to represent the population Rapide-Danseur in the House of Commons of Canada.
