= Quebec Route 386 =

Highway in Quebec, Canada

Route 386

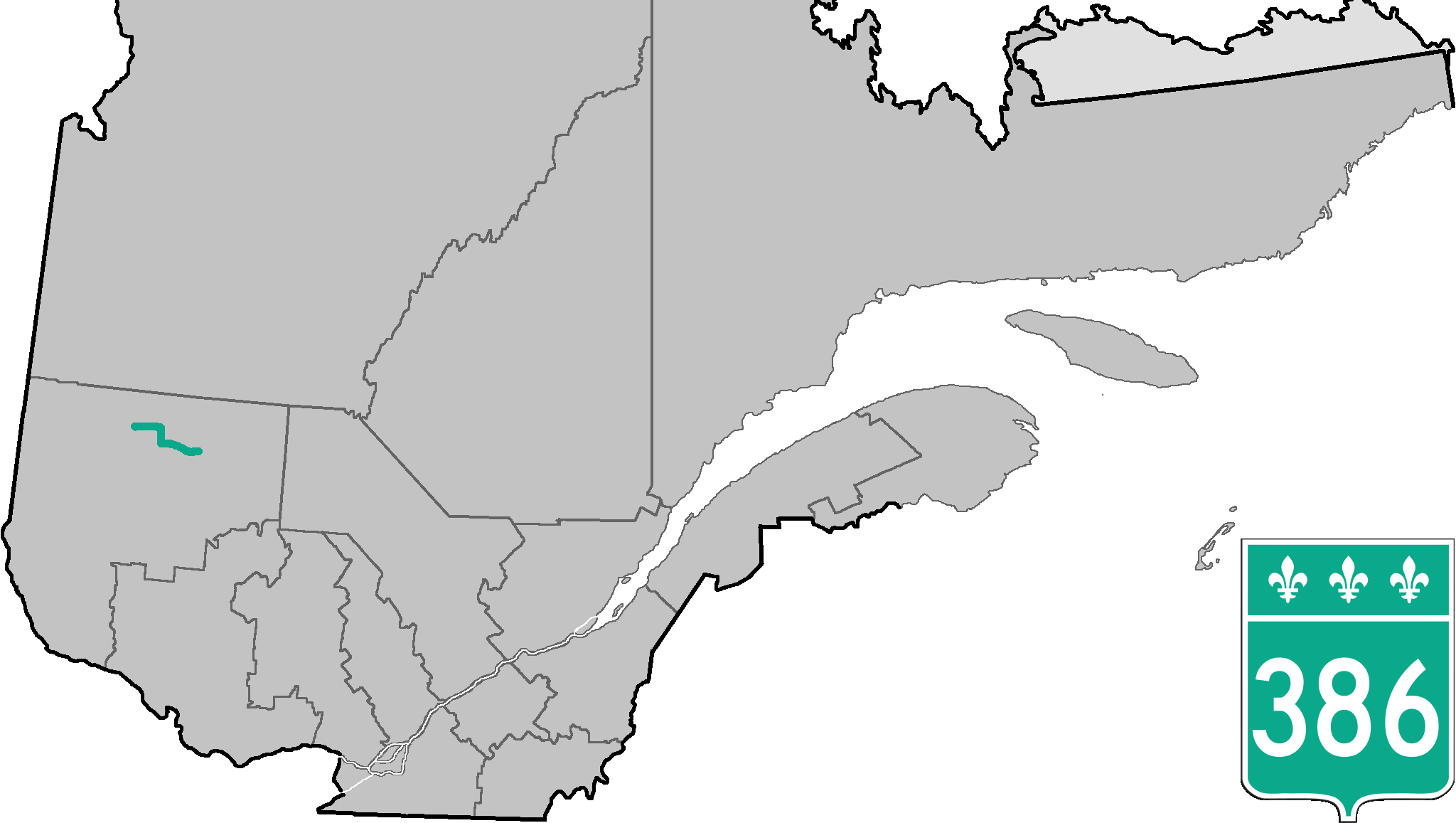

Route information
- Maintained by Transports Québec
- Length: 75 km (47 mi)

Major junctions
- West end: R-111 in Amos
- East end: R-113 in Senneterre

Location
- Country: Canada
- Province: Quebec
- Major cities: Amos, Senneterre

Highway system
- Quebec provincial highways; Autoroutes; List; Former
← R-385	→ R-388

Route 386 is a 75 km two-lane east/west highway located in the Abitibi-Témiscamingue region in Quebec, Canada. It starts at the junction of Route 111 close to Amos and ends at the junction of Route 113 in Senneterre.

== Towns along Route 386 ==
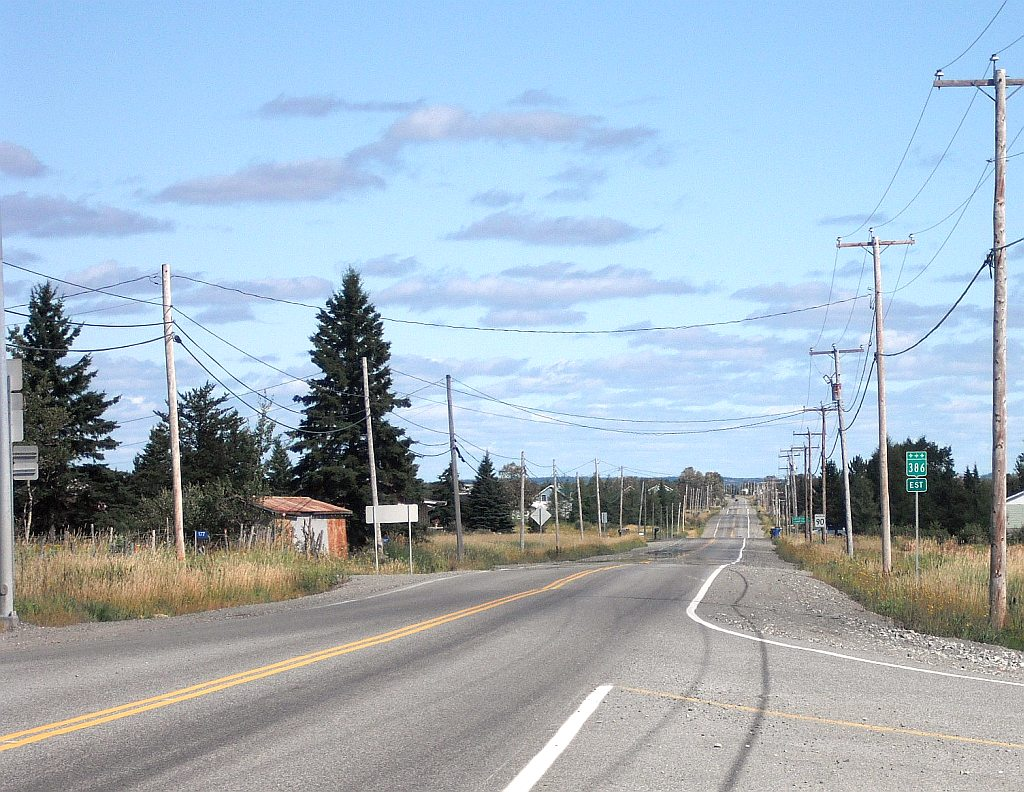
Quebec Route 386 in Amos

- Amos
- Landrienne
- Barraute
- Belcourt
- Senneterre

== See also ==
- List of Quebec provincial highways
