= Hawk Junction =

Community in Ontario, Canada

- Unincorporated community
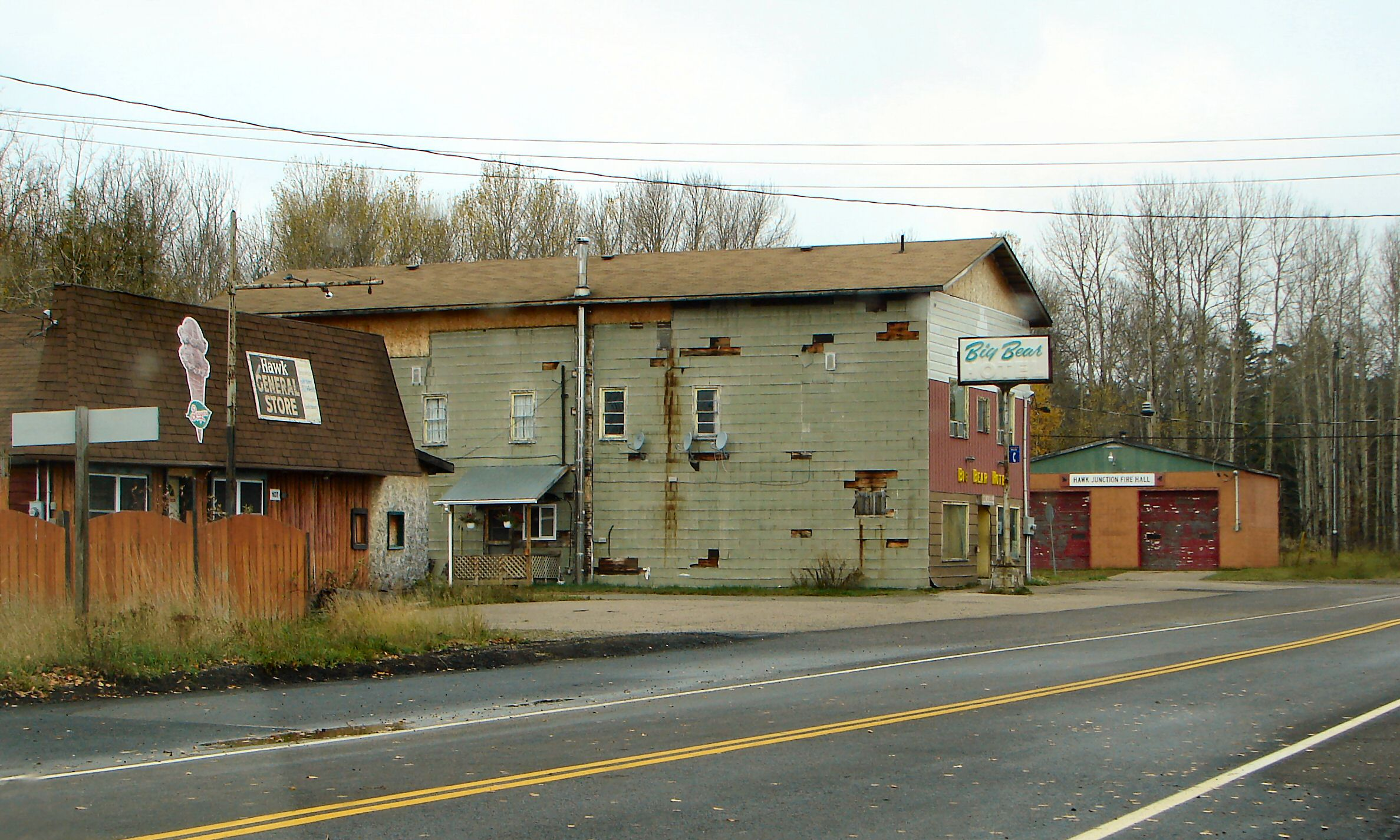

- Location within Ontario
- Coordinates: 48°05′15″N 84°33′30″W
- Country: Canada
- Province: Ontario
- District: Algoma
- Census subdiv.: Unorg. North Algoma
- Settled: 1909

Government
  - Fed. riding: Sault Ste. Marie—Algoma
  - Prov. riding: Algoma—Manitoulin

Area
  - Land: 83.35 km^{2} (32.18 sq mi)
- Elevation: 318 m (1,044 ft)

Population (2021)
  - Total: 138
  - Density: 1.7/km^{2} (4.4/sq mi)
- Time zone: UTC-5 (EST)
  - Summer (DST): UTC-4 (EDT)
- Postal code: P0S 1G0
- Area codes: 705

Hawk Junction is a community with a local services board in the Canadian province of Ontario, located just north of Highway 101, about 30 kilometres (19 mi) east of Wawa.

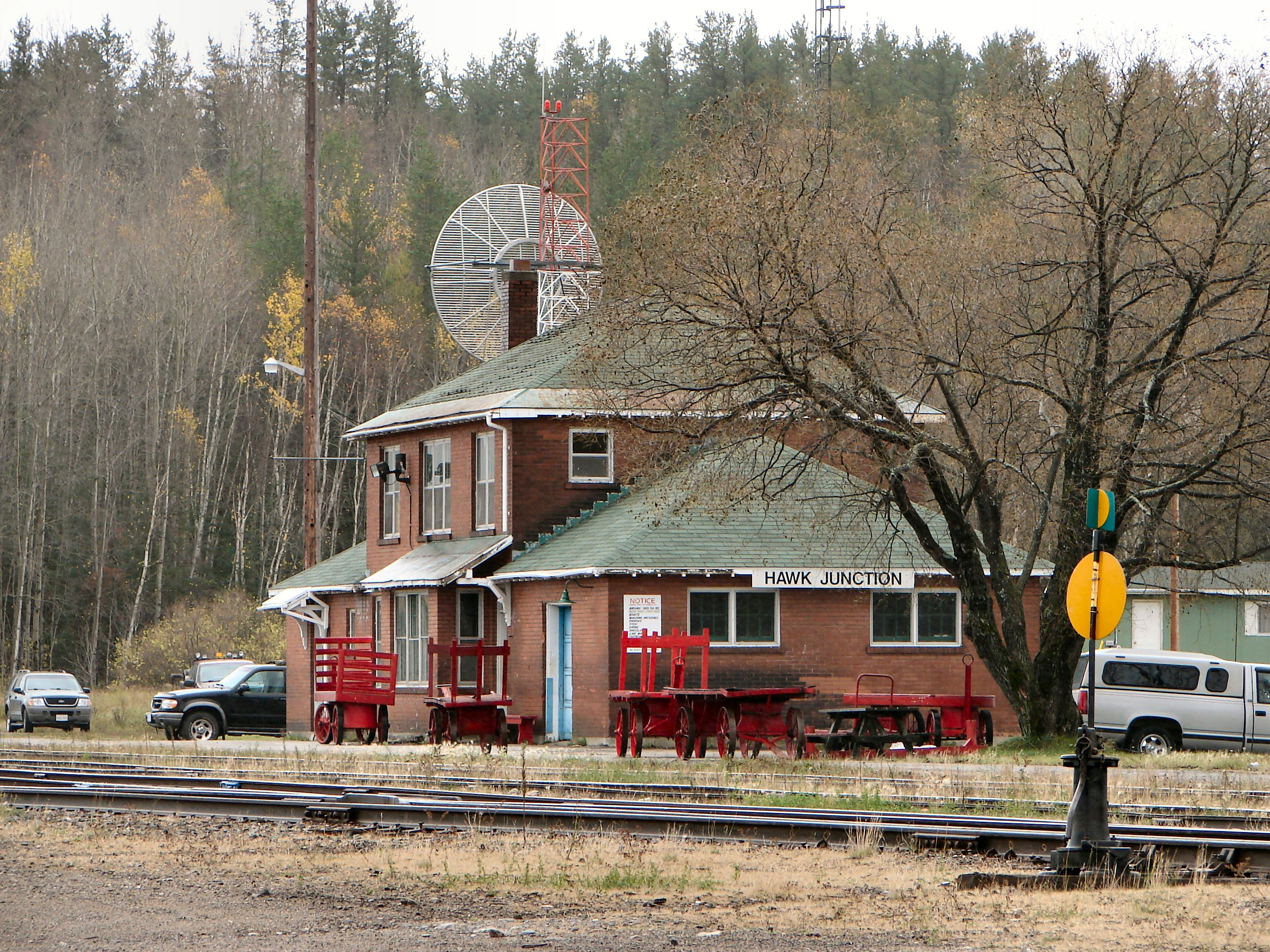
ACR station in Hawk Junction

The community was established by people of Italian, Scottish and French descent in 1909 when the Algoma Central Railway was built through the area. In 1923 and 1924, it was destroyed by fire. The community was rebuilt and is now a terminal for the Algoma Central Railway.

In September 2017, the last operating business, the Big Bear Hotel, closed, leaving Hawk Junction without any stores or services. Residents had to drive to the nearby town of Wawa for any services. The Big Bear has reopened and is serving lunch and dinner regularly. The Big Bear Hotel is now the site of the Hawk Junction Winter Craft Sale held in late November. Hawk Junction is a popular starting point for wilderness hunting and fishing trips. During the winter Hawk Junction is a major snowmobile drop off point. The Big Bear has reopened its doors under a new owner.

== Demographics ==
In the 2021 Census of Population conducted by Statistics Canada, Hawk Junction had a population of 138 living in 72 of its 109 total private dwellings, a change of −12.7% from its 2016 population of 158. With a land area of 83.35 km^{2} (32.18 sq mi), it had a population density of 1.7/km^{2} (4.3/sq mi) in 2021.

Canada census – Hawk Junction community profile

	2021	2016	2011
Population	138 (-12.7% from 2016)	158 (-16.8% from 2011)	190 (-22.1% from 2006)
Land area	83.35 km^{2} (32.18 sq mi)	83.32 km^{2} (32.17 sq mi)	83.14 km^{2} (32.10 sq mi)
Population density	1.7/km^{2} (4.4/sq mi)	1.9/km^{2} (4.9/sq mi)	2.29/km^{2} (5.9/sq mi)
Median age	60.8 (M: 59.2, F: 60.8)	57.3 (M: 57.4, F: 57.0)	53.9 (M: , F: )
Private dwellings	109 (total) 72 (occupied)	160 (total) 81 (occupied)	135 (total)
Median household income	$ n/r	$60,352

References: 2021 2016 2011

Historical census populations – Hawk Junction
Year	Pop.	±%
2006	244	—
2011	190	−22.1%
2016	158	−16.8%
2021	138	−12.7%
Source: Statistics Canada
