= Beattie Gold Mine =

Gold mine in Duparquet, Quebec, Canada

- Location in Québec, Canada

Location
- Location: Duparquet, Québec, Canada; 48°30′27″N 079°14′02″W

History
- Opened: 1933
- Closed: 1956

The Beattie Gold Mine is an abandoned gold mine in Duparquet, Quebec, Canada that began operating in 1933 and led to the founding of the town it is located in. Due to accidents claiming in total 26 lives and pollution, the installations were permanently closed in 1956. The mining concession is still active and there is talks into converting it into an open pit mine and demolish the remnants of the Beattie mine.

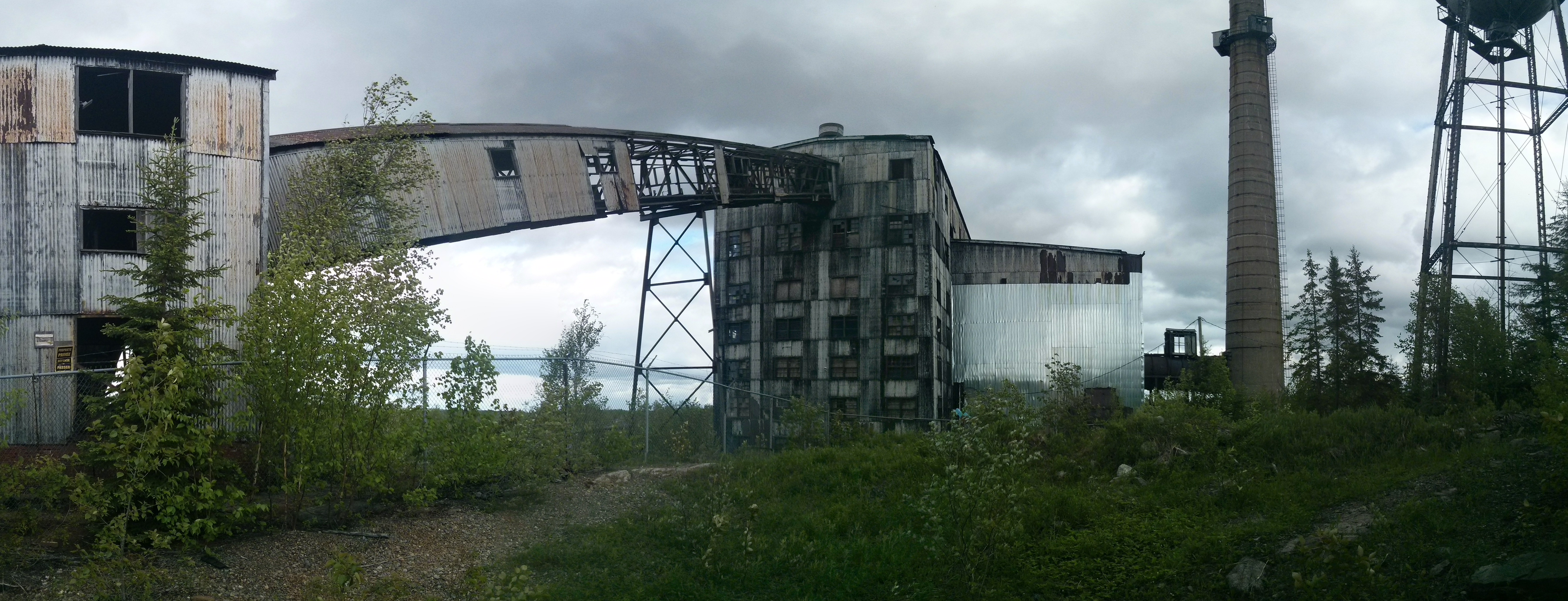

== Discovery and prospection ==
Abandoned mining equipment

The credit for the discovery of the Beattie deposit belongs to Mr. John Beattie, who has been interested in the district since 1910. He found gold in small veins in basalts on Beattie island, near the outlet of Duparquet lake, and did a considerable amount of work there, but the showings did not seem to warrant large-scale development. He then turned his attention to the mainland east of the lake, where a body of feldspar porphyry was discovered near the lake and values in gold were obtained. The first zone opened-up at the north was thoroughly drilled by the Consolidated Mining and Smelting Company, but did not prove sufficiently attractive, so their option lapsed. Further work westward, towards the west end of the porphyry' body, opened-up a wider zone in a similar position, and the assays were attractive enough to warrant a new option, which was finally taken over by Ventures Limited.

Ventures drilled this new area and obtained indications of a large tonnage of material with values considered to be commercial. The Nipissing Mining Company became associated with Ventures for a 40 per cent interest in the undertaking, and in 1932 a prospect shaft was sunk in the ore to a depth of 220 feet. The results were so encouraging that a major development was at once undertaken for an initial production of about 600 tons per day, with planned gradual expansion to 5,000 tons per day.
