= Peder Jensen =

Peder Jensen may refer to:

- Peder Are Nøstvold Jensen, Norwegian blogger who uses the alias Fjordman
- Peder Jensen (equestrian) (1897-1938), Danish equestrian
- Peder Jensen Fauchald (1791-1856), Norwegian politician
- Peder Vilhelm Jensen-Klint (1853-1930), Danish architect, designer, painter and architectural theorist

== See also ==
- Peter Jensen (disambiguation)
