= Saint-Bruno-de-Guigues =

- Municipality
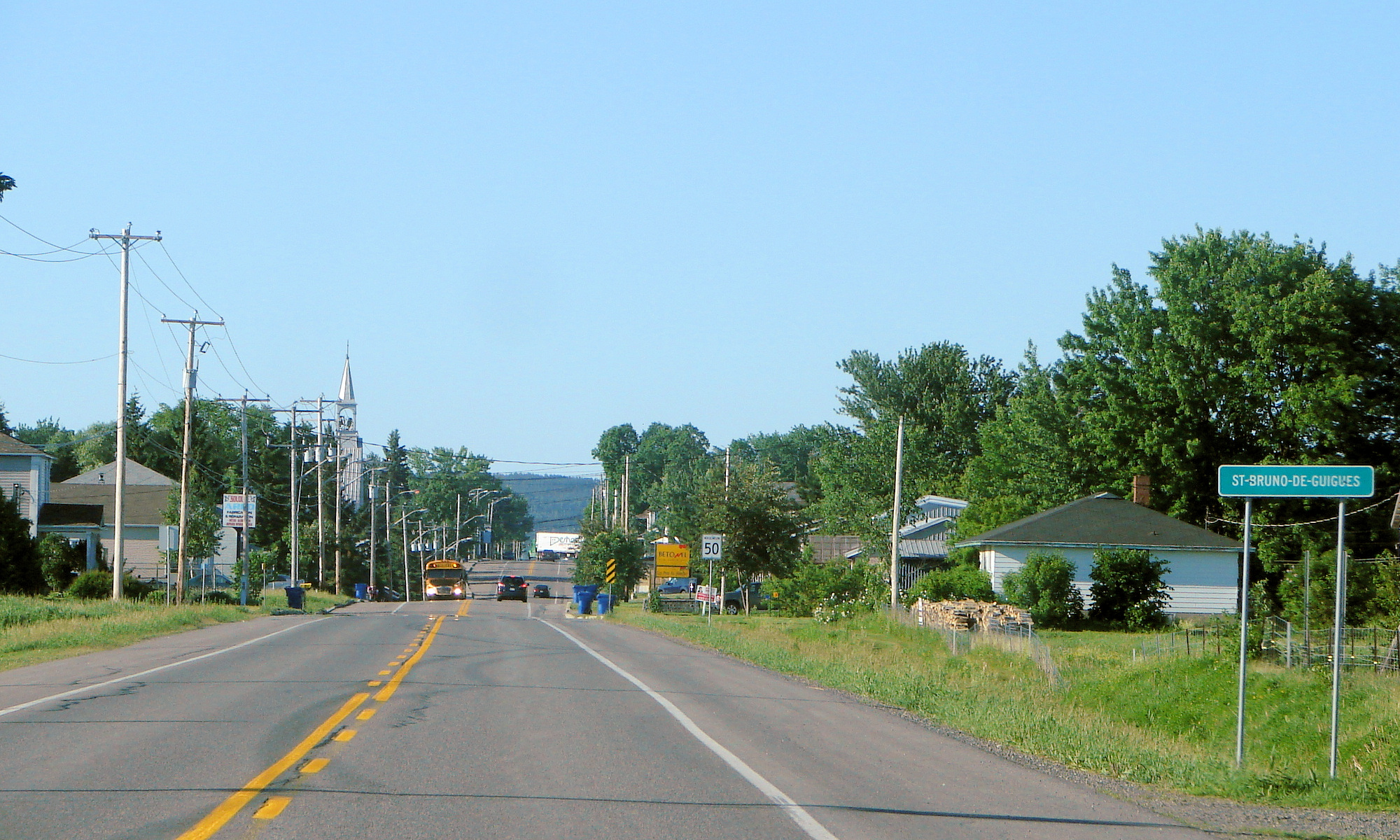

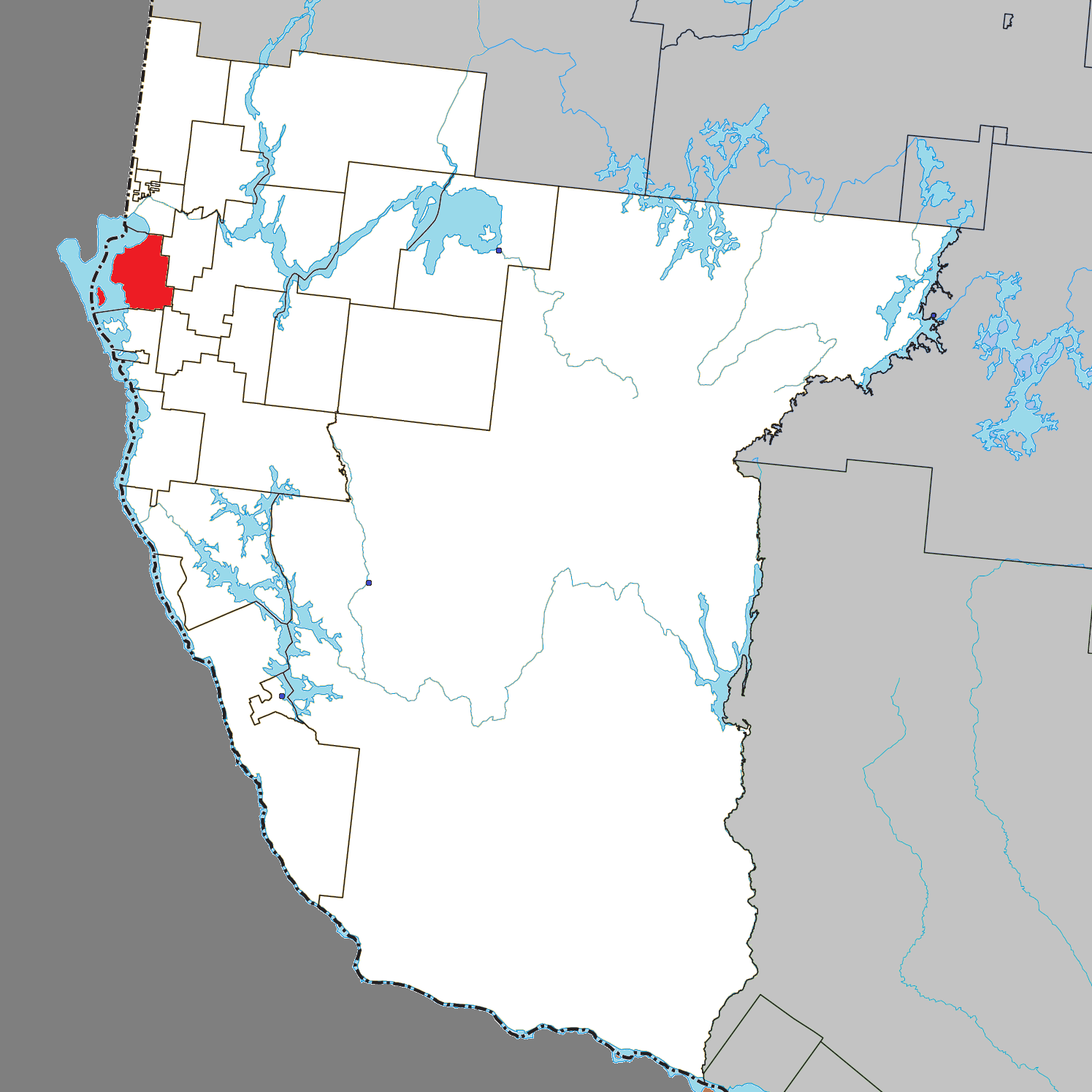
- Location within Témiscamingue RCM

- Location in western Quebec
- Coordinates: 47°28′N 79°26′W
- Country: Canada
- Province: Quebec
- Region: Abitibi-Témiscamingue
- RCM: Témiscamingue
- Settled: 1880s
- Constituted: October 3, 1912

Government
  - Mayor: Richard Robert
  - Federal riding: Abitibi—Témiscamingue
  - Prov. riding: Rouyn-Noranda–Témiscamingue

Area
  - Total: 186.46 km^{2} (71.99 sq mi)
  - Land: 125.77 km^{2} (48.56 sq mi)

Population (2021)
  - Total: 1,185
  - Density: 9.4/km^{2} (24/sq mi)
  - Pop (2016–21): ▲2.7%
  - Dwellings: 604
- Time zone: UTC−5 (EST)
  - Summer (DST): UTC−4 (EDT)
- Postal code(s): J0Z 2G0
- Area code: 819
- Website: www.guigues.ca

Saint-Bruno-de-Guigues (French pronunciation: [sɛ̃ bʁyno də ɡiɡ]), often shortened to Guigues, is a municipality in northwestern Quebec, Canada, in the Témiscamingue Regional County Municipality.

In addition to the main namesake population centre, the municipality also includes the hamlet of Pointe-Piché, located on the shores of Lake Timiskaming.

== History ==
The area was originally inhabited by Algonquin people, who had discovered a lead mine as early as the 17th century. The mine was not exploited however until circa 1850, when it was rediscovered and noted for its high silver content. The Wright mine, operating between 1885 and 1903, and from 1915 to 1952, was Canada's first silver mine.

The first settler was Édouard Piché, who arrived in 1863. A year later, he moved to the place that came to be known as Pointe Piché.

In 1881, the geographic township of Guigues was proclaimed, named in honour of Joseph-Bruno Guigues. In 1886, the parish of Saint-Bruno-de-Guigues was established. The following year, 20 families lived in Guigues Township, which grew to 300 by 1897. That same year, the township was incorporated as the Township Municipality of Guigues.

In 1912, the Township Municipality of Guigues was divided into the Parish Municipality of Saint-Bruno-de-Guigues and the Municipality of Saint-Eugène-de-Guigues. On May 6, 1995, the Parish Municipality of Saint-Bruno-de-Guigues changed statutes to become a regular municipality.

== Demographics ==
Canada census – Saint-Bruno-de-Guigues community profile

	2021	2016	2011
Population	1,185 (+2.7% from 2016)	1,154 (+4.9% from 2011)	1,100 (+2.2% from 2006)
Land area	125.77 km^{2} (48.56 sq mi)	127.70 km^{2} (49.31 sq mi)	125.34 km^{2} (48.39 sq mi)
Population density	9.4/km^{2} (24/sq mi)	9.2/km^{2} (24/sq mi)	8.8/km^{2} (23/sq mi)
Median age	44.8 (M: 44.4, F: 44.8)	41.1 (M: 41.1, F: 41.0)	42.0 (M: 39.4, F: 44.2)
Private dwellings	604 (total) 497 (occupied)	613 (total) 471 (occupied)	540 (total) 449 (occupied)
Median household income	$78,000	$65,984	$59,704

References: 2021 2016 2011

Historical census populations – Saint-Bruno-de-Guigues

Year	Pop.	±%
1901	603	—
1911	1,624	+169.3%
1921	1,426	−12.2%
1931	1,312	−8.0%
1941	1,199	−8.6%
1951	1,364	+13.8%
1956	1,422	+4.3%

Year	Pop.	±%
1961	1,476	+3.8%
1966	1,519	+2.9%
1971	1,328	−12.6%
1976	1,148	−13.6%
1981	1,134	−1.2%
1986	1,081	−4.7%
1991	1,069	−1.1%

Year	Pop.	±%
1996	1,117	+4.5%
2001	1,129	+1.1%
2006	1,076	−4.7%
2011	1,100	+2.2%
2016	1,154	+4.9%
2021	1,185	+2.7%

Source: Statistics Canada

Mother tongue (2021):

- English as first language: 1.7%
- French as first language: 95.4%
- English and French as first language: 1.3%
- Other as first language: 1.7%

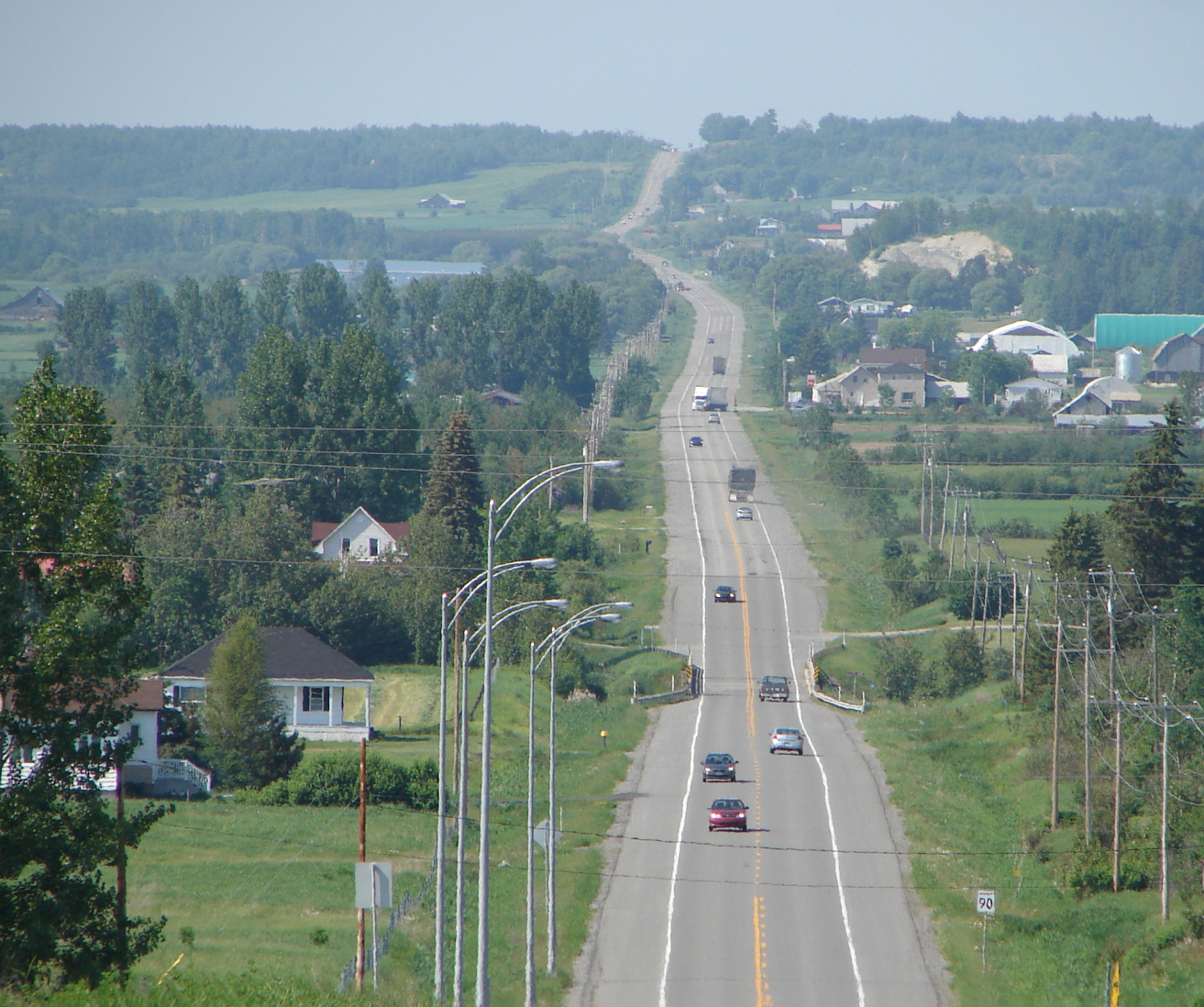
Highway 101 through Saint-Bruno-de-Guigues

== Government ==
List of former mayors:

- Gérard Pétrin (...–2009)
- Joanne Larochelle (2009–2013)
- Donald Alarie (2013–2015)
- Carmen Côté (2016–2021)
- Richard Robert (2021–present)

== See also ==
- List of municipalities in Quebec
