= Luc Blanchette =

Canadian politician in Quebec

Member of the National Assembly of Quebec for Rouyn-Noranda–Témiscamingue
- In office April 7, 2014 – August 29, 2018
- Preceded by: Gilles Chapadeau
- Succeeded by: Émilise Lessard-Therrien

Personal details
- Born: 25 February 1960 (age 66) Cap-de-la-Madeleine, Quebec
- Party: Quebec Liberal Party

Luc Blanchette is a Canadian politician in Quebec, who was elected to the National Assembly of Quebec in the 2014 election. He represented the electoral district of Rouyn-Noranda–Témiscamingue as a member of the Quebec Liberal Party. He was initially appointed Minister for Mines and Minister responsible for the Abitibi-Témiscamingue region and the Nord-du-Québec region, and then on August 20, 2016, he left the Mines portfolio and became Minister of Forests, Wildlife and Parks. He was defeated in the 2018 election.
