= Duparquet =

- City
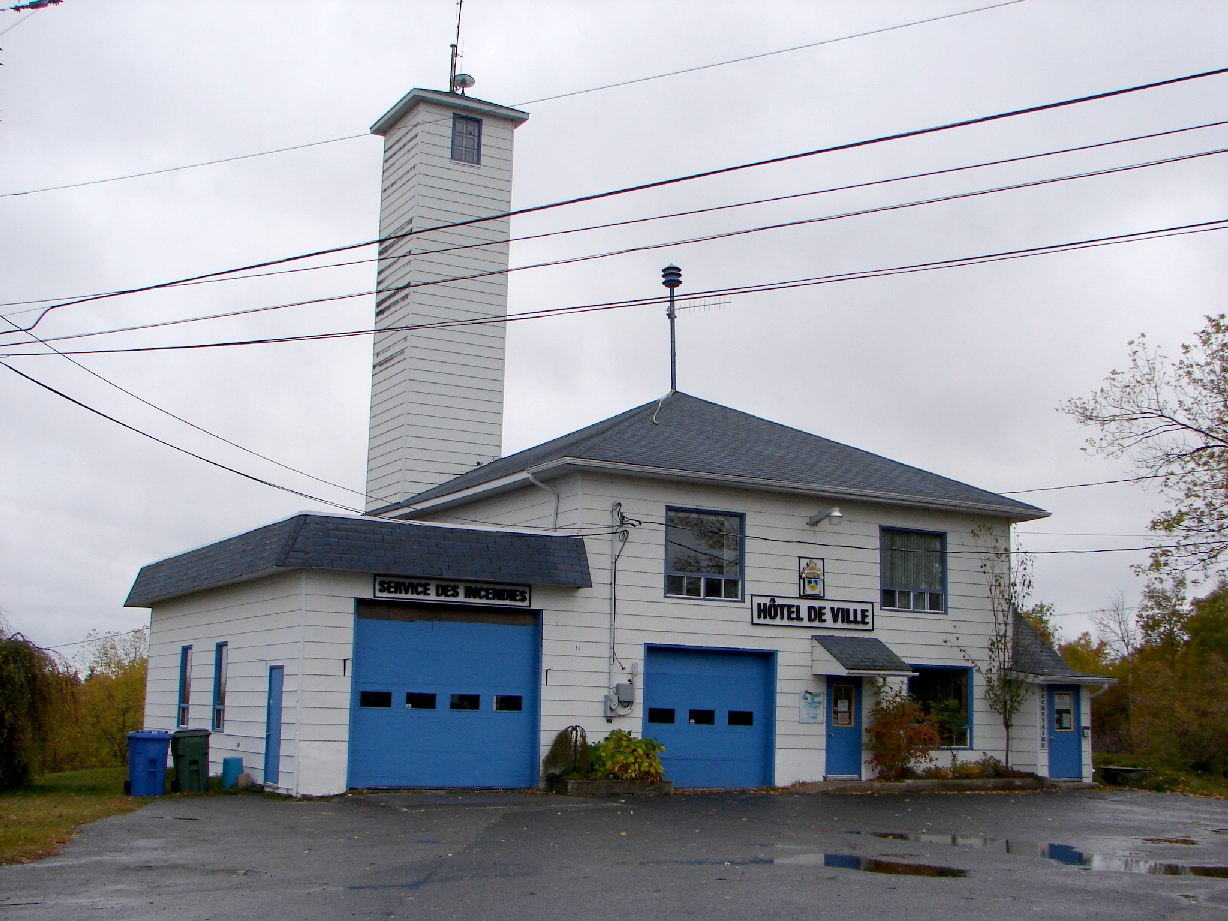
- Town Hall of Duparquet

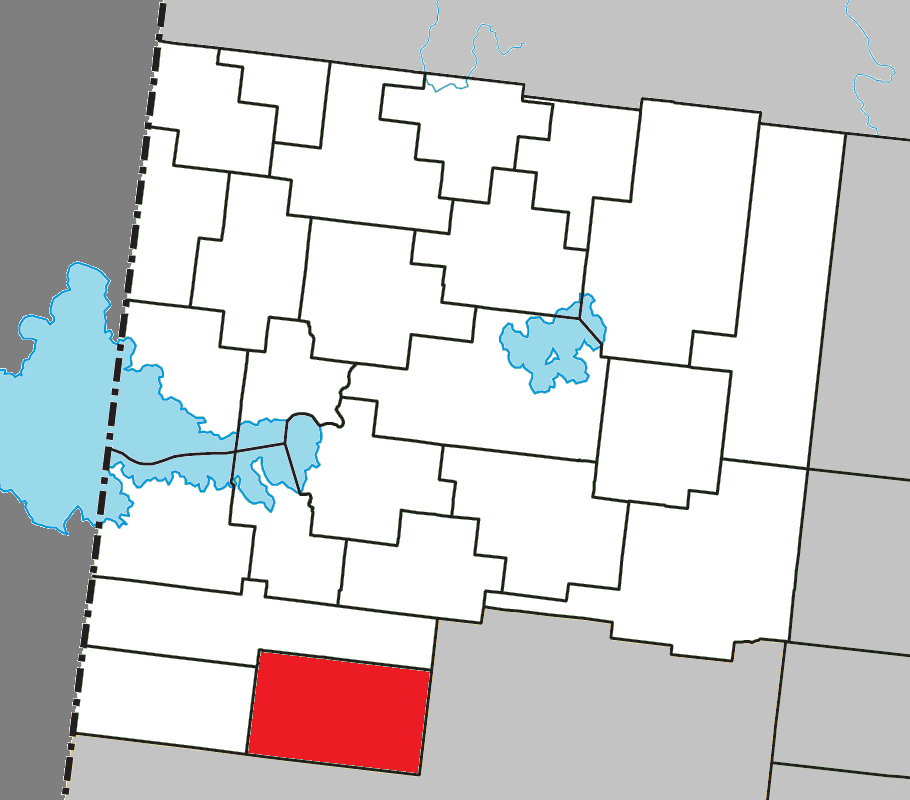
- Location within Abitibi-Ouest RCM

- Location in western Quebec Duparquet (Canada)
- Coordinates: 48°30′N 79°14′W
- Country: Canada
- Province: Quebec
- Region: Abitibi-Témiscamingue
- RCM: Abitibi-Ouest
- Constituted: April 13, 1933

Government
  - Mayor: Denis Blais
  - Federal riding: Abitibi—Témiscamingue
  - Prov. riding: Abitibi-Ouest

Area
  - Total: 156.36 km^{2} (60.37 sq mi)
  - Land: 121.17 km^{2} (46.78 sq mi)

Population (2021)
  - Total: 716
  - Density: 5.9/km^{2} (15/sq mi)
  - Pop 2016-2021: ▲7.5%
  - Dwellings: 389
- Time zone: UTC−05:00 (EST)
  - Summer (DST): UTC−04:00 (EDT)
- Postal code(s)/: J0Z 1W0
- Area code: 819
- Highways: R-388 R-393
- Website: duparquet.ao.ca/fr/

Duparquet (French pronunciation: [dypaʁkɛ]) is a city in northwestern Quebec, Canada, in the MRC d'Abitibi-Ouest of the Abitibi-Témiscamingue region. It covers 157.4 km^{2} (60.8 sq mi) and had a population of 716 as of the Canada 2021 Census. It was named to tribute Jean-Annet Chabreuil Du Parquet, a grenadier captain of the La Sarre Regiment, that was part of Louis-Joseph de Montcalm's army.

== History ==
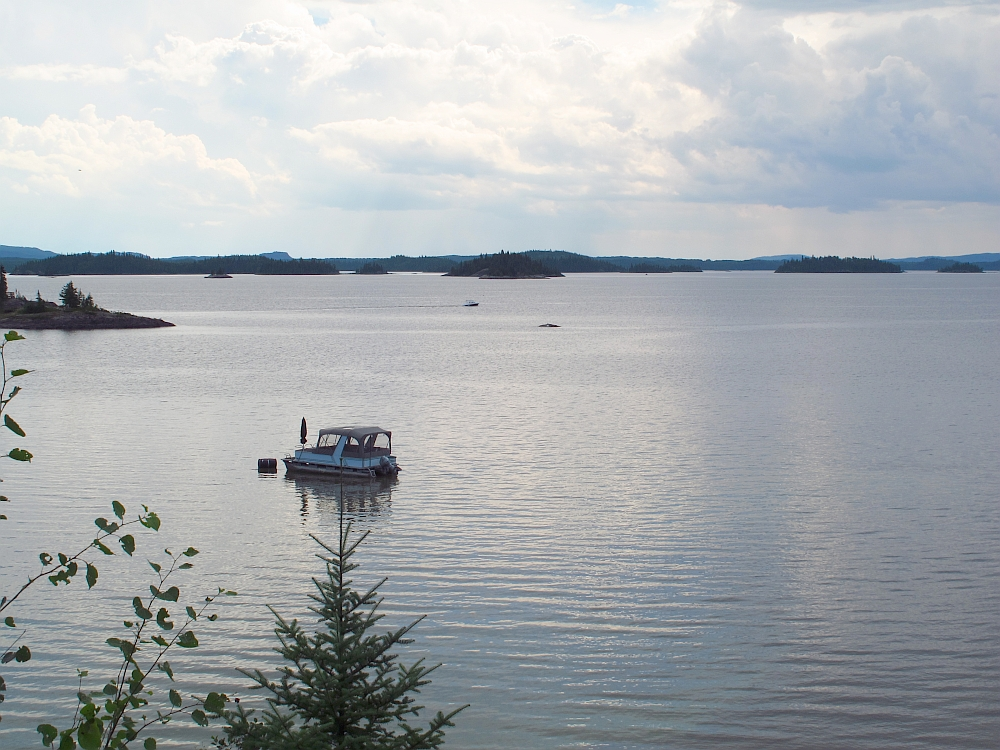
A view of Lake Duparquet from Chemin du Lac, a waterfront road in Duparquet

In 1912, a rich gold vein was discovered near Lake Duparquet by a prospector named Beattie. He set up the Beattie Gold Mine company that began operation in 1933. That same year, the new community forming at the mine was incorporated as Ville de Duparquet, named after the geographic township in which it is located. The township was named in 1916 in honour of Jean-Annet Chabreuil Du Parquet, a grenadier captain of the La Sarre Regiment, that was part of General Montcalm's army.

After producing 1 million ounces of gold and killing at least 27 miners, including 4 in a landslide on 9 July 1946, the mine closed in 1956. But the owners of the mining rights are currently considering reopening it as an open-pit mine.

== Demographics ==
In the 2021 Census of Population conducted by Statistics Canada, Duparquet had a population of 716 living in 342 of its 389 total private dwellings, a change of 7.5% from its 2016 population of 666. With a land area of 121.17 km^{2} (46.78 sq mi), it had a population density of 5.9/km^{2} (15.3/sq mi) in 2021.

Canada census – Duparquet community profile

	2021	2016	2011
Population	716 (+7.5% from 2016)	666 (1.4% from 2011)	657 (2.8% from 2006)
Land area	121.17 km^{2} (46.78 sq mi)	123.57 km^{2} (47.71 sq mi)	123.63 km^{2} (47.73 sq mi)
Population density	5.9/km^{2} (15/sq mi)	5.4/km^{2} (14/sq mi)	5.3/km^{2} (14/sq mi)
Median age	48.4 (M: 50.0, F: 45.2)	50.9 (M: 51.2, F: 50.2)	48.3 (M: 48.3, F: 48.2)
Private dwellings	389 (total) 342 (occupied)	389 (total)	359 (total)
Median household income	$73,500	$62,464	$.N/A

References: 2021 2016 2011

Historical Census Data - Duparquet, Quebec

Year	Pop.	±%
1941	1,384	—
1951	1,485	+7.3%
1956	1,114	−25.0%
1961	978	−12.2%
1966	913	−6.6%
1971	786	−13.9%

Year	Pop.	±%
1976	642	−18.3%
1981	581	−9.5%
1986	640	+10.2%
1991	680	+6.2%
1996	738	+8.5%
2001	675	−8.5%

Year	Pop.	±%
2006	639	−5.3%
2011	657	+2.8%
2016	666	+1.4%
2021	716	+7.5%

Source: Statistics Canada

Mother tongue (2021):

- English as first language: 0.7%
- French as first language: 98.6%
- English and French as first language: 0%
- Other as first language: 0%

== Government ==
=== Municipal council ===
As of 2023:

- Mayor: Denis Blais
- Councillors: Donald Baril, Marlene Doroftei, Claudette Macameau, Véronique Drouin-Lecompte, Chantal Provencher, Solange Gamache
- General Director: Chantal Poirier

== Notable people ==
- Tim Horton, hockey player and entrepreneur, lived in Duparquet as a child
- Johanne Morasse (born March 12, 1957), a Quebec politician and teacher
- Walter Ostanek, polka musician and "Canada's Polka King"
- Elmer "Moose" Vasko, Chicago Black Hawks player during the 1960s.
