= Gilles Chapadeau =

Canadian politician

His Worship Gilles Chapadeau

Mayor of Rouyn-Noranda
- Incumbent
- Assumed office November 2025
- Preceded by: Diane Dallaire

MNA for Rouyn-Noranda–Témiscamingue
- In office September 2012 – 2014
- Preceded by: Daniel Bernard
- Succeeded by: Luc Blanchette

Personal details
- Party: Parti Québécois

Gilles Chapadeau is a Canadian politician, who was a Parti Québécois member of the National Assembly of Quebec for Rouyn-Noranda–Témiscamingue from 2012 to 2014.

He was elected in the 2012 Quebec general election, but was defeated in 2014 and 2018.

Chapadeau was elected mayor of Rouyn-Noranda in the 2025 municipal elections, without any opposition.
