= Johanne Morasse =

Canadian politician and teacher

MNA for Rouyn-Noranda–Témiscamingue
- In office April 25, 2007 – November 5, 2008
- Preceded by: Daniel Bernard
- Succeeded by: Daniel Bernard

Personal details
- Born: March 12, 1957 (age 69) Duparquet, Quebec
- Party: Parti Québécois
- Profession: teacher

Johanne Morasse (born March 12, 1957, in Duparquet, Quebec) is a Quebec politician and teacher. She was a Member of National Assembly of Quebec for the riding of Rouyn-Noranda–Témiscamingue in the Abitibi-Témiscamingue region from 2007 to 2008. She represents the Parti Québécois.

Morasse holds a bachelor's degree in political science from Université Laval. She went to the University of British Columbia and obtained a master's degree in forestry. She also went to study in Finland and received a doctorate in forestry and agriculture from the University of Helsinki.

She worked at the Faculty of Forestry and Geometrics at the Université Laval as a teacher, lecturer and research assistant. She also worked as a teaching assistant at the University of British Columbia. She was also a forestry engineer consultant and the Director of the Centre technologique des résidus industriels (Industrial Residual Technology Center). She was also an administration member at the Université du Québec en Abitibi-Témiscamingue and was treasurer of the Regional Economique Development Council of the Abitibi-Témiscamingue.

Morasse won the seat in the 2007 elections by defeating Liberal incumbent MNA Daniel Bernard.

== Election results ==
2008 Quebec general election
Party	Candidate	Votes	%	±%
Liberal	Daniel Bernard	10,358	42.30	+9.64
Parti Québécois	Johanne Morasse	8,604	35.14	+2.03
Action démocratique	Paul-Émile Barbeau	4,111	16.79	-10.05
Québec solidaire	Guy Leclerc	1,413	5.78	-1.61

2007 Quebec general election
Party	Candidate	Votes	%	±%
Parti Québécois	Johanne Morasse	9,481	33.11	
Liberal	Daniel Bernard	9,352	32.66	
Action démocratique	Mario Provencher	7,687	26.84	
Québec solidaire	France Caouette	2,117	7.39	
