= Gilles Baril (PQ) =

Canadian businessman and politician

Member of the National Assembly of Quebec for Rouyn-Noranda–Témiscamingue
- In office 1981–1985
- Preceded by: District was created
- Succeeded by: Gilles Baril

Member of the National Assembly of Quebec for Berthier
- In office 1994–2002
- Preceded by: Albert Houde
- Succeeded by: Marie Grégoire

Personal details
- Born: 24 March 1957 (age 69) Saint-Eugène-de-Guigues, Quebec, Canada
- Party: Parti Québécois
- Profession: politician, administrator

Gilles Baril (born 24 March 1957) is a Canadian businessman, journalist and former politician in Quebec, Canada. He was a Parti Québécois member of the National Assembly of Quebec (MNA).

== Early life and education ==
Born in Saint-Eugène-de-Guigues, Quebec, Baril has a B.A. in Journalism and Political Science from the University of Moncton.

== Political career ==
He defeated incumbent Camil Samson in 1981 and became the Parti Québécois Member of the National Assembly for the district of Rouyn-Noranda–Témiscamingue at the age of 24. He became parliamentary assistant in 1984. In the 1985 election, he was defeated by another Gilles Baril, the candidate of the Quebec Liberal Party.

From 1990 to 1994, Baril was Director of Pavillon du Nouveau Point de vue, an addiction intervention center. He also had a career in the media. Baril made a political comeback in 1994, when he was elected to the legislature in the district of Berthier. He served as a parliamentary assistant and was re-elected in 1998. From 1998 to 2002, Baril was a Member of the Cabinet of Premiers Lucien Bouchard and Bernard Landry. He also was his party's campaign manager.

In 2002 though, he resigned and left politics, after allegations of corruption were made against him and lobbying firm Oxygène 9. From 2002 to 2005, Baril was in charge of the Hydro-Québec International office in Santiago, Chile. After Hydro Québec International, Baril is a vice president in Quebec engineering and construction company DESSAU.

== Electoral record (partial) ==
1998 Quebec general election: Berthier
Party	Candidate	Votes	%	±%
Parti Québécois	Gilles Baril	20,074	53.58	−0.08
Liberal	Sylvie Thouin	11,710	31.26	−5.04
Action démocratique	Robert Robitaille	5,113	13.65	+5.31
Socialist Democracy	François Rivest	297	0.79	–
Natural Law	Louise Roy	268	0.72	+0.01
Total valid votes		37,462	98.59	–
Rejected and declined votes		535	1.41	–
Turnout		37,997	79.51	−2.51
Electors on the lists		47,790	–	–
Source: Official Results, Le Directeur général des élections du Québec.
