= Peter Jensen (psychologist) =

Canadian Olympic trainer and sports psychologist

Peter Jensen is a Canadian Olympic trainer and sports psychologist. He has worked with Olympians for over 20 years; the 2010 Vancouver Winter Games was his seventh Olympics.

== Career ==
Jensen is a sports psychologist who has worked frequently with professional Canadian sports teams. Writing in July 2012 for Torstar News Services, journalist Steve Milton stated that Jensen was "the first sports psychologist officially connected to a Canadian national team (figure skating)".

A native of Toronto, Jensen was raised in a small Quebecan mining city (Rouyn-Noranda) and played several sports including baseball, hockey, and football. He attributed his interest in sports psychology to his youth when he "had a very excitable personality, and learned that my excitability got in the way of performing at my best in certain situations". Jensen has worked as a sports psychologist for the Canadian Olympics team. In a 2010 article for CBC Sports, journalist Nancy Wilson wrote that Jensen had helped Olympians for over 20 years, noting that the 2010 Vancouver Winter Games marked the seventh Olympics he was involved in. Since the 1984 Olympics, he has assisted his country's athletes at each subsequent Olympics.

In the 1986 World Figure Skating Championships in Geneva, figure skater Brian Orser was the favorite to earn what would have been his first world title though ultimately did not because of a suboptimal performance. After the championship, Orser contacted Jensen, asking Jensen to be his sports psychologist. Jensen helped Orser relax and focus on the competition by dealing with family issues beforehand and taking lengthy pre-competition walks. One year after Geneva, Orser received a gold medal in the 1987 World Figure Skating Championships in Cincinnati. In a 1988 interview with the Toronto Star, Orser, who won the silver medal for Canada in that year's Winter Olympics, said, "Peter Jensen is of major importance to my success here because he helps me maintain my mind-set". Orser and Jensen worked together to help Orser overcome stress and distraction. Instead of shunning the media, Orser chose to have daily press conferences.

At the 1988 Calgary Olympics, Jensen received more than 160 entreaties from journalists for interviews. The interest in the innovative field of sports psychology stemmed from people's interest in the inner mechanisms of a sportsperson's brain. In a 2008 interview with The Hamilton Spectator's Donna Spencer, Jensen said he failed to reply to the entreaties owing to his desire to work in the background.

Jensen served as the athletic director of Glendon College, York University's satellite campus. In 1988, he managed Collingwood's Centre for High Performance. In 1991, he established the consulting company Performance Coaching.

During the 2008 IIHF Women's World Championship, Jensen worked with the Canada women's national ice hockey team, counseling them whenever they had emotional issues. The players sometimes were reluctant to discuss troubles with the coach because the troubles occasionally involved their standing in the team. The players were comfortable with talking to him because he gave them no pressure; he was not their coach, their parents, or Hockey Canada. Before the team traveled to Harbin, People's Republic of China for the world championship, he told the players about how to overcome the difficulties inherent in a change of environment: much traveling and a new time zone. After the team landed in China, he lectured to them about Chinese history to aid them in acclimating to the overseas environment. When the hockey coach noticed a player who seemed downcast, the coach would point out the player to Jensen, implicitly suggesting that he talk with her. Jensen said that he would not disclose the content of his discussions with players because he held trust and confidentiality to be of paramount importance. Becky Kellar-Duke, the team's assistant captain, praised Jensen for helping players "not get so overwhelmed by some of the things". In his 2010 interview with Wilson, he said a "winning mindset" was distinguished by four attributes: "imagery, perspective, time management and focus".
