= Arthur =

Masculine given name

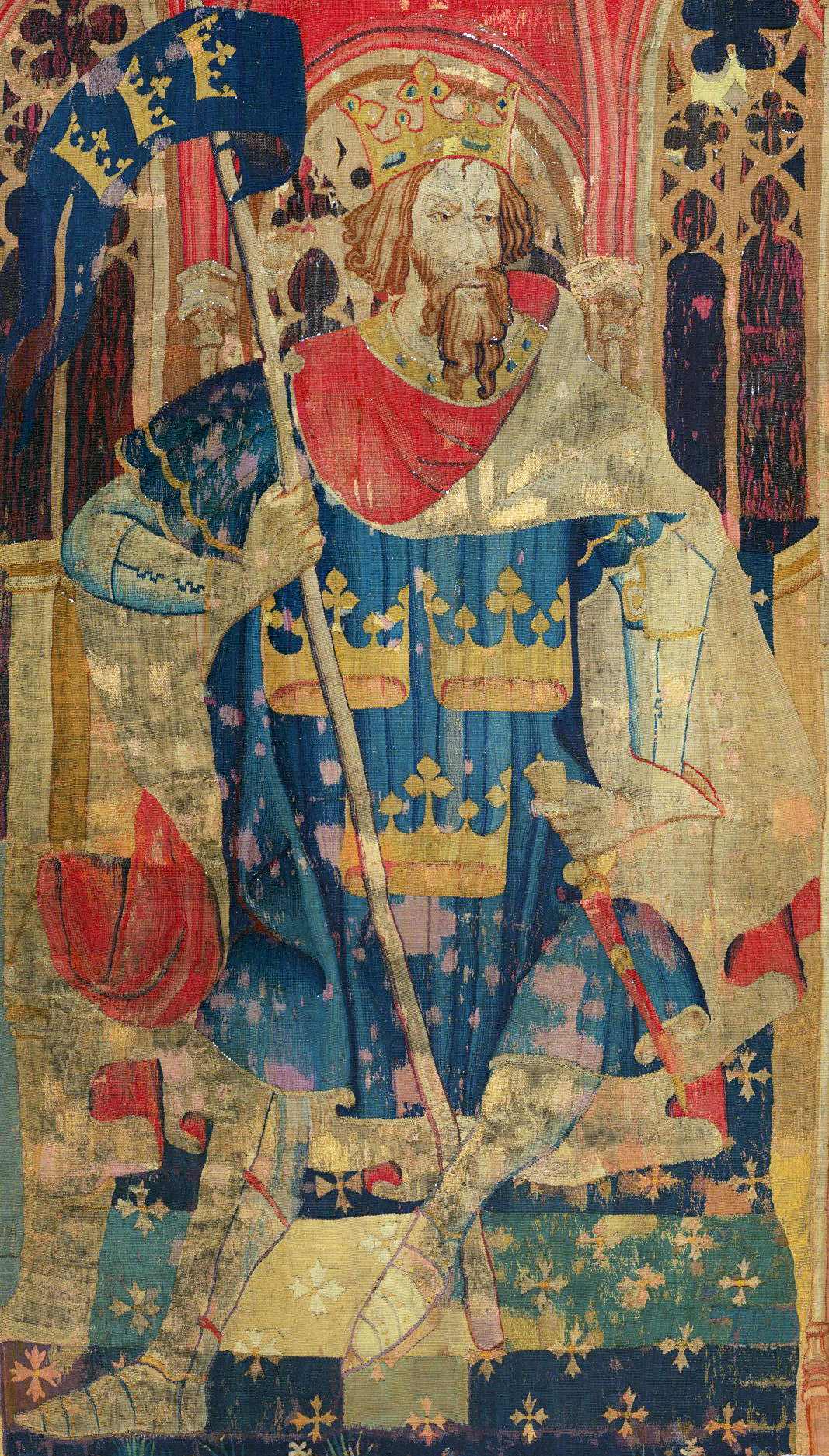
- The folk hero King Arthur popularized the name.
- Pronunciation: English: /ˈɑːrθər/ AR-thər; Welsh: [ˈɑrθɨr] German: [ˈaʁtuːɐ̯] Dutch: [ˈɑrtyːr] French: [aʁtyʁ]
- Gender: Male
- Language: Welsh, Brythonic, Celtic, Latin

Other names
- See also: Artur, Art, Artie (short form), Arturo, Artturi or/and Arttu (Finnish variant)

Arthur is a masculine given name of uncertain etymology. Its popularity derives from it being the name of the legendary hero King Arthur.

A common spelling variant used in many Slavic, Romance, and Germanic languages is Artur. In Spanish and Italian, a common spelling variant used is Arturo.

== Etymology ==
The earliest attestation of the name Arthur is in the early 9th century Welsh-Latin text Historia Brittonum, where it refers to a circa 5th century Romano-British general who fought against the invading Saxons, and who later gave rise to the famous King Arthur of medieval legend and literature. A possible earlier mention of the same man is to be found in the epic Welsh poem Y Gododdin by Aneirin, which some scholars assign to the late 6th century, though this is still a matter of debate and the poem only survives in a late 13th century manuscript entitled the Book of Aneirin. A 9th-century Breton landowner named Arthur witnessed several charters collected in the Cartulary of Redon.

The Irish borrowed the name by the late 6th century (either from an early Archaic Welsh or Cumbric form Artur), producing Old Irish Artúr (Latinized as Arturius by Adomnán in his Life of St. Columba, written circa 697–700), The earliest historically attested bearer of the name is a son or grandson of Áedán mac Gabráin (died 609).

The exact origins of the name Arthur remains a matter of debate. Some claim that it derives from the Roman nomen gentile (family name) Artorius. Artorius itself is of obscure and contested etymology; some have proposed a Messapic or Etruscan origin. Nevertheless, according to etymologist Kemp Malone "the theory that derives Arthur from Artorius is left unsupported by any evidence worthy of the name".

According to the linguist and Celticist Stefan Zimmer, it is possible that Artorius has a Celtic origin, being a Latinization of the hypothetical name *Artorījos, derived from the patronym *Arto-rīg-ios, meaning "Son of the Bear/Warrior-King". *Arto-rīg-ios is unattested, but the root, *arto-rīg, "bear/warrior-king", is the source of the Old Irish personal name Artrí, while the similar *Arto-maglos, "bear-prince", produced names in several Brittonic languages. According to Zimmer's etymology, the Celtic short compositional vowel -o- was lengthened and the long -ī- in the second element of the compound -rījos was shortened by Latin speakers, under the influence of Latin agent nouns ending in -tōr (and their derivatives in -tōrius). Some scholars have noted that the legendary King Arthur's name only appears as Arthur, Arthurus, or Arturus in early Latin Arthurian texts, never as Artōrius (although the Classical Latin Artōrius became Arturius in some Vulgar Latin dialects). However, this may not say anything about the origin of the name Arthur, as Artōrius would regularly become Art(h)ur when borrowed into Welsh.

The commonly proposed derivation from Welsh arth "bear" + (g)wr "man" (earlier *Arto-uiros in Brittonic) is not possible for phonological and orthographic reasons; notably that a Brittonic compound name *Arto-uiros should produce Old Welsh *Artgur (where -u- represents the short vowel /u/) and Middle/Modern Welsh *Arthwr and not Arthur (where -u- is a long vowel /ʉː/) In Welsh poetry the name is always spelled Arthur and is exclusively rhymed with words ending in -ur—never words ending in -wr—which confirms that the second element cannot be [g]wr "man").

An alternative theory, which has gained limited acceptance among scholars, derives the name Arthur from the Latin Arcturus (the brightest star in the constellation Boötes, near Ursa Major or the Great Bear), which is the latinisation of the Greek Ἀρκτοῦρος (Arktouros) and means Bear Guardian from ἄρκτος (arktos "bear") and οὖρος (ouros "watcher/guardian"). This form, Arcturus would have become Art(h)ur when borrowed into Welsh, and its brightness and position in the sky led people to regard it as the "guardian of the bear" and the "leader" of the other stars in Boötes.

== Translations ==
- Albanian: Artur
- Amharic: አርተር
- Arabic: أرثر, ارثور, ارتور
- Armenian: Արթուր (Art'ur)
- Azerbaijani: Artur
- Basque: Artur, Artza
- Bengali: আর্থার (Ārthāra)
- Breton: Arzhur
- Bulgarian: Артур (Artur)
- Catalan: Artur, Artús
- Celtic: Arto, Artto
- Chechen: Артур (Artur)
- Chinese: Simplified: 亚瑟 (Yàsè), 阿瑟 (Āsè), 阿图尔 (Ātúěr) Traditional: 亞瑟 (Yàsè), 阿瑟 (Āsè), 阿圖爾 (Ātúěr)
- Croatian: Artur
- Czech: Artuš, Artur
- Danish: Arthur
- Dutch: Arthur, Artuur
- Estonian: Artur, Ats
- English: Arthur
- Finnish: Artturi, Arttu, Arto, Artto
- French: Arthur
- Galician: Artur, Artús
- Georgian: ართური (Arturi)
- German: Artur, Arthur
- Greek: Αρθούρος (Arthouros/Artouros)
- Gujarati: આર્થર (Ārthara)
- Hebrew: ארתור (Artur)
- Hindi: आर्थर (aarthar)
- Hungarian: Artúr
- Icelandic: Arthur
- Indonesian: Arthur
- Inuktitut: ᐋᑐᕐ (aatur)
- Irish: Artúr
- Italian: Arturo (common name), Artù (the Briton king)
- Japanese: アーサー (Āsā) (in katakana)
- Kannada: ಆರ್ಥರ್‌ (Ārthar‌)
- Korean: 아서 (Aseo), 아써 (Asseo), 아더 (Adeo)
- Kurdish: ئارتەر
- Latin: Arturus/Arthurus, Artorius/Arturius
- Latvian: Artūrs
- Lithuanian: Artūras
- Malayalam: ആർതർ (ārtar)
- Maldivian: އަރތަރ
- Maltese: Arturu, Turu
- Manx: Artair
- Nāhuatl: Arthur
- Norman: Èrthu
- Norwegian: Artur
- Ossetian: Артур (Artur)
- Patois: Aata
- Persian: آرتور
- Polish: Artur
- Portuguese: Artur, Arthur (archaic spelling, common in Brazil)
- Punjabi: Gurmukhi script: ਆਰਥਰ (Ārathara), Shahmukhi script: آرتھر
- Romanian: Arthur, Artur
- Russian: Артур (Artur)
- Serbian: Артур (Artur)
- Sinhalese: ආතර් (ātar)
- Slovak: Artúr, Artuš
- Slovenian: Artur
- Spanish: Arturo
- Swedish: Artur
- Tatar: Artur (Артур)
- Thai: อาร์เธอร์ (Xār̒ṭhexr̒)
- Turkish: Artur
- Ukrainian: Артур (Artur)
- Urdu: آرتھر
- Uzbek: Artur
- Welsh: Arthur

== People and fictional characters ==
=== Kings and princes ===
==== Legendary ====
- King Arthur, legendary king in Arthurian legend

==== Brittany ====
- Arthur I, Duke of Brittany (1187–1203), claimant to the English throne.
- Arthur II, Duke of Brittany (1261–1312)
- Arthur III, Duke of Brittany (1393–1458)

==== Great Britain ====
- Arthur, Prince of Wales (1486–1502), elder son of Henry VII of England
- Prince Arthur, Duke of Connaught and Strathearn (1850–1942), seventh child and third son of Queen Victoria
- Prince Arthur of Connaught (1883–1938), son of Prince Arthur, Duke of Connaught and Strathearn

=== Notable people ===
- Arthur or Arthur Melo (born 1996), Brazilian footballer
- Arthur (footballer, born 2003) (Arthur Augusto de Matos Soares), Brazilian footballer
- Arthur (footballer, born 2005) (Arthur Wenderroscky Sanches), Brazilian footballer
- Arthur "Man" Agee Jr., American former Chicago-area high school basketball player
- Arthur Folasa Ah Loo (died 2025), Samoan fashion designer
- Arthur Ahmed (born 1970), Ghanaian politician
- Arthur Albiston (born 1957), Scottish footballer
- Arthur Alexander (1940–1993), American soul singer and songwriter
- Arthur Antunes Coimbra (born 1953), Brazilian footballer, commonly known as Zico
- Arthur Ashe (1943–1993), American tennis player
- Arthur Askey (1900–1982), English comedian
- Artur Awejde (1838–1863), Polish commissioner of Augustów Voivodeship during the January Uprising
- Arthur Balfour (1848–1930), earl of Balfour, British politician, and prime minister under Edward VII
- Arthur Harold Beal (1896–1992), creator of Nitt Witt Ridge
- Arthur Berloget, also known as "The Countess", a 19th-century French transgender woman who was a singer, writer, and courtesan
- Arthur James "Daddy" Black (1877– 1932), American businessman
- Art Blakey (1919–1990), American jazz drummer and bandleader
- Arthur Blok (1882–1974), English first administrative head of the Technion – Israel Institute of Technology
- Arthur Bluethenthal (1891–1918), American football player
- Arthur Blythe (1940–2017), American jazz saxophonist and composer
- Arthur Bradfield (1892–1978), English cricketer
- Arthur Bramley (1929–2021), English footballer
- Arthur Brauss (1936–2025), German actor
- Arthur Bremer (born 1950), American attempted assassin of George Wallace
- Arthur Buck (born 1935), Canadian politician
- Arthur Beecher Carles (1882–1952), American modernist painter
- Art Carney (1918–2003), American actor
- Arthur Cayley (1822–1895), British mathematician
- Sir Arthur C. Clarke (1917–2008), British writer
- Arthur Cohn (1927–2025), Swiss film producer
- Arthur Compton (1892–1962), American physicist
- Sir Arthur Conan Doyle (1859–1930), British writer
- Arthur Conley (1946–2003), American soul singer
- Arthur Brynley Creber (1909-1966), Welsh cricketer
- Arthur Currie (1875–1933), Canadian Army officer
- Arthur Danto (1924–2013), American philosopher and art critic
- Arthur Darvill (born 1982), British actor and musician
- Arthur Marcelles de Silva (1879–1957), Sri Lankan Sinhala surgeon
- Arthur Delaporte (born 1991), French politician
- Arthur Wentworth Hamilton Eaton (1849–1937), Protestant Episcopal clergyman and writer
- Sir Arthur Eddington (1882–1944), British astrophysicist
- Arthur F. Ells (1879–1963), justice of the Connecticut Supreme Court
- Sir Arthur Evans (1851–1941), British archaeologist
- Arthur Fenner (1745–1805), fourth Governor of Rhode Island
- Arthur Fils (born 2004), French tennis player
- Arthur Frommer (born 1929), American travel writer and publisher
- Arthur Burdett Frost (1851–1928), American illustrator, graphic artist, painter and comics writer
- Arthur J. Gallagher, founder of Arthur J. Gallagher & Co.
- Art Garfunkel (born 1941), American entertainer
- Arthur Gatter (1940–1990), German serial killer
- Arthur de Gobineau (1816–1882), French polemicist and political and historical writer
- Arthur Godfrey (1903–1983), American radio and television personality
- Arthur Goldberg (1908–1990), American politician and judge
- A. O. Granger (1846–1914), American industrialist and soldier
- Arthur Greiser (1897–1946), German Nazi SS officer executed for war crimes
- Arthur Guinness (1725–1803), Irish brewer
- Arthur Hailey (1920–2004), British novelist
- Arthur Hands (1894–1965), British photographer
- Arthur Harvey (disambiguation), several people
- Arthur H. Healey (1920–2003), justice of the Connecticut Supreme Court
- Arthur Lawrence Hellyer Jr. (1923–2018), American radio host
- Art Heyman (1941–2012), American NBA basketball player
- Arthur Holden (born 1959), Canadian voice actor
- Arthur Holmes (1890–1965), English geologist
- Arthur Honegger (1892–1955), Swiss composer
- Arthur James Johnes (1809–1871), English judge
- Arthur J. Jones (born 1948), American neo-Nazi politician
- Arthur Kennedy (1914–1990), American actor
- Arthur Koestler (1905–1983), British writer
- Arthur Kornberg (1918–2007), American biochemist
- Arthur Laffer (born 1940), American economist
- Arthur Leclerc (born 2000), Monégasque racing driver
- Arthur Lee (1945–2006), American musician
- Arthur Lethbridge (known as Ivor Moreton) (1908–1984), British singer and pianist
- Arthur Liebehenschel (1901–1948), German commandant at the Auschwitz and Majdanek concentration camps executed for war crimes
- Art Linkletter (1912–2010), Canadian-born American radio and television personality
- Arthur Loveridge (1891–1980), British herpetologist
- Arthur Lydiard (1917–2004), New Zealand runner and athletics coach
- Arthur MacArthur Jr., (1845–1912), American soldier
- Arthur "Harpo" Marx (1888–1964), American comedian and musician
- Arthur Marshall (disambiguation), several people
- Arthur Meighen (1874–1960), Canadian prime minister in the 1920s
- Arthur Miley (born 1993), American football player
- Arthur Miller (1915–2005), American playwright
- Arthur Ngirakelsong (1941–2022), chief justice of the Supreme Court of Palau
- Arthur O'Shaughnessy (1844–1881), British poet and herpetologist
- Arthur Parker (disambiguation), several people
- Arthur Uther Pendragon (born 1954), British neo-druid leader
- Arthur Piedfort (born 2005), Belgian footballer
- Art Potter (1909–1998), Canadian ice hockey administrator
- Arthur Prysock (1924–1997), American jazz and R&B singer
- Arthur Ranasinghe, Sri Lankan civil servant
- Arthur M. Recht (1938–2018), justice of the Supreme Court of Appeals of West Virginia
- Arthur Rimbaud (1854–1891), French poet
- Arthur Rödl (1898–1945), German Nazi SS commandant of the Gross-Rosen concentration camp
- Arthur J. Rosier (1880–1932), American politician
- Arthur J. Samberg (1941–2020), American businessman
- Arthur Scargill (born 1938), British miners' union leader
- Arthur M. Schlesinger, Jr. (1917–2007), American historian
- Arthur Moritz Schoenflies (1853–1928), German mathematician
- Arthur Schopenhauer (1788–1860), German philosopher
- Arthur Seyss-Inquart (1892–1946), Austrian Nazi politician
- Arthur "Buddy" Schumacher (1916–1925), boy who was found murdered in 1925
- Art Shamsky (born 1941), American baseball player and manager
- Arthur Shapiro (disambiguation), several people
- Arthur Shawcross (1945–2008), American cannibalistic serial killer and rapist
- Arthur Shuttlewood (1920–1996), British ufologist
- Arthur Donaldson Smith (1866–1939), American explorer
- Sir Arthur Sullivan (1842–1900), English composer
- Arthur Swift (1810–1855), American politician
- Art Tatum (1909–1956), American jazz pianist
- Arthur Tracy (1899–1997), American singer and actor
- Arthur Treacher (1894–1975), English actor
- Arthur Vandenberg (1884–1951), American politician
- Arthur Warbrick (1863–1902), New Zealand rugby footballer
- Arthur Wellesley (1769–1852), British Army officer and statesman
- Arthur Wijewardena (1887–1964), Chief Justice of Sri Lanka from 1949-1950
- Arthur A. Wilson, Anglo-Indian cinematographer
- Arthur Wong (born 1956), Hong Kong cinematographer, actor and film director
- Arthur Yap (1943–2006), Singaporean poet, writer and painter

=== Fictional characters ===
- Arthur "Artie" Bucco, a character on The Sopranos
- Arthur Dent, the main character of The Hitchhiker's Guide to the Galaxy series
- Arthur Fowler, a character in soap opera EastEnders
- Arthur Fonzarelli, a character in the American TV sitcom Happy Days
- Arthur Morgan, the main character of the video game Red Dead Redemption 2
- Arthur Read, the main character in Arthur (TV series)
- Arthur Weasley, a character in the Harry Potter book series

== See also ==
- Artur
- Arturo
- MacArthur (disambiguation)
- Macarthur (disambiguation)
- McArthur (disambiguation)
