= List of lakes in Val-des-Monts, Quebec =

This is a list of the 138 lakes in the municipality of Val-des-Monts, in Les Collines-de-l'Outaouais Regional County Municipality, in the Canadian province of Quebec.

== A ==
- Lac Achigan
- Lac de l'Aigle
- Lac Armida
- Lac des Atacas

== B ==
- Lac Barnes
- Lac à Barnet
- Lac du Barrage
- Lac Bastien
- Lac Bataille
- Lac Benoît
- Lac au Billots
- Lac Blair
- Lac Blueberry
- Lac Bois Franc
- Lac du Bois franc (Hardwood Lake)
- Lac Bonin
- Lac Bonsall
- Lac de la Boue
- Lac Bout à Bout
- Lac Bran de Scie
- Lac Brassard
- Lac du Brochet
- Lac Buckes
- Lac à Butor

== C ==
- Lac de la Campe d'Ours
- Lac du Castor
- Lac aux Castors (Beaver Lake)
- Lac Central
- Lac Champeau
- Lac du Chantier Brûlé
- Lac Charbonneau
- Lac au Chevreuil
- Lac Chevreuil
- Lac du Chevreuil
- Lac aux Chutes
- Lac Clair
- Petit lac Clair
- Lac Claude
- Lac Coco
- Lac Colbert
- Lac Corrigan
- Lac Corriveau
- Lac Croche

== D ==
- Lac Dam (Lac Dame)
- Petit lac de la Dame
- Lac Davis
- Lac Dodds
- Lac Donavan
- Lac Dycie

== E ==
- Lac de l'Écluse
- Lac Edges
- Lac Edwards (Quebec)
- Lac Ellsworth
- Lac des Épinette
- Lac à l'Eau Claire (Val-des-Monts)
- Lac à l'Eau Rouge

== F ==
- Lac Faguette
- Lac Farley
- Petit lac Farley
- Lac Fauteux (Lac à Hynes)
- Lacs à Foins
- Lac Forked
- Lac à Freeburg

== G ==
- Lac Galipeau
- Lac Gardiner
- Lac Gauvin
- Lac Gilmour
- Lac Girard
- Lac du Gouvernement
- Lac Grand (Quebec)
- Lac Grondin

== H ==
- Lac la Héronnière
- Lac Houston
- Lac Huot
- Petit lac Huot

== I ==
- Lac Indian

== J ==
- Petit lac Joe

== L ==
- Lac Lachaîne
- Lac Létourneau
- Lac Lockhart
- Lac de la Loutre (Lac aux Cèdres)
- Lac Lynch

== M ==
- Lac à Manuel
- Lac du Marbre
- Lac Maria-Goretti
- Petit lac à Martin
- Lac Maskinongé
- Lac des Mauves
- Lac McArthur (Val-des-Monts)
- Lac Mcfee
- Petit lac Mcfee
- Lac McGarry
- Lac McGlashan
- Lac McGregor
- Baie McLaren
- Lac McLaren
- Lac McLeod
- Lac McMullin
- Lac McNab
- Lac Morel
- Lac Murray

== N ==
- Lac Nadeau
- Lac Newcombe
- Lac Newton
- Lac Noir (Val-des-Monts)

== O ==
- Lac Orange

== P ==
- Lac Paquin
- Lac à Patry
- Petit lac à Pelissier
- Lac Pennock
- Lac à la Perdrix
- Lac Perdu
- Lac Pipe

== R ==
- Lac du Ravage
- Lac Rencurel
- Lac Rhéaume
- Lac Robinson

== S ==
- Lac Saint-Antoine
- Lac Saint-Germain
- Lac Saint-Pierre (Val-des-Monts)
- Lac Sainte-Hélène
- Lac Sanscartier
- Lac Scattergood
- Petit lac à Serpent
- Lac Sheridan
- Lac Star
- Lac Sucker (Lac Louise)

== T ==
- Lac Tenpenny
- Lac Terreur
- Lac à Thom
- Lac de la Truite Maigre
- Lac à la Truite
- Petit lac à la Truite
- Lacs Twin (Lacs Jumeaux)

== U ==
- Lac de l'Union

== V ==
- Lac Vert (Val-des-Monts)

== W ==
- Lac Wallingford
- Lac Waters
- Lac Wright

== See also ==
- List of lakes of Quebec
- List of rivers of Quebec
- Geography of Quebec
