= McArthur Lake =

McArthur Lake and variations may refer to:

== Canada ==
- Lake McArthur (British Columbia), a lake in Yoho National Park
- McArthur Lake (Northwest Territories), a lake east of Great Slave Lake
- McArthur Lake (Ontario), a lake south of the city of Timmins
- McArthur Lake (Saskatchewan), a lake east of Pelican Narrows, Saskatchewan
- Lac McArthur (Val-des-Monts), a lake in Quebec

== United States ==
- McArthur Lake (Idaho), a reservoir in Idaho
  - McArthur Lake Wildlife Corridor, a wildlife corridor in Idaho
  - McArthur Lake Wildlife Management Area, a protected area in Idaho
- McArthur Lake (Fort Bragg), a reservoir in North Carolina

== See also ==
- List of lakes named McArthur, includes variations such as "MacArthur's Lake" in Australia
- McArthur (disambiguation)
