= Artūras =

Artūras is a Lithuanian masculine given name. It is a cognate of the English language name Arthur. Notable people with the name include:

- Artūras Barysas (1954–2005), Lithuanian "counter-culture" actor, singer, photographer, and filmmaker
- Artūras Dubonis (born 1962), Lithuanian historian
- Artūras Gudaitis (born 1993), Lithuanian basketball player
- Artūras Jomantas (born 1985), Lithuanian basketball player
- Artūras Karnišovas (born 1971), retired Lithuanian professional basketball player
- Artūras Kasputis (born 1967), retired track and road cyclist from Lithuania
- Artūras Milaknis (born 1986), Lithuanian basketball player
- Artūras Paulauskas (born 1953), Lithuanian politician
- Artūras Rimkevičius (born 1983), Lithuanian footballer
- Artūras Skučas (born 1961), writer and military man of Lithuania
- Arturas Veta, Soviet sprint canoeist
- Artūras Zuokas (born 1968), Lithuanian journalist, businessman, leader of the Liberal and Centre Union political party
