= List of lakes named McArthur =

McArthur Lake, MacArthurs Lake or MacArthur's Lake is the name of several lakes in Australia, Canada and the United States:

List of lakes named McArthur
Country	State / Province	Coordinates	Name	Notes
Australia	Victoria	34.741364°S 142.15541°E	MacArthur's Lake	Small seasonal lake in the Raak Plain boinka. In January the water table is 2 to 13 centimetres (0.79 to 5.12 in) below the lake floor. Salinity in the lake rises from 149,000 mg/L in July to 206,000 mg/L in September due to evaporative concentration.
Canada	British Columbia	51.332477°N 16.337908°W	Lake McArthur	In the Yoho National Park, 1.5 kilometres (0.93 mi) long and 85 metres (279 ft) deep.
Canada	Northwest Territories	61.578051°N 106.829679°W	McArthur Lake	On the Taltson River in the Northwest Territories. About 12 miles (19 km) long from east to west. Apparently the lake that the explorer Samuel Hearne named "Clowey Lake".
Canada	Nova Scotia	45.763415°N 61.24624°W	MacArthurs Lake	In Inverness County, just west of Big Brook Road. Drains into Big Brook. A railway line runs along its east shore between the lake and the road. It is at an elevation of 111 metres (364 ft).
Canada	Nova Scotia	45.787801°N 60.302678°W	MacArthurs Lake	In Cape Breton Regional Municipality. It is just north of MacMullin Lake, to which it is connected by a channel, and south of Figure of Eight Lake. It lies to the west of Grand Mira North Road. It has been described as "a beautiful pond". Like MacMullin Lake it is part of the Framboise River watershed. It is at an elevation of 31 metres (102 ft).
Canada	Nova Scotia		McArthur's Lake	An 1884 report mentions McArthur's Lake on the Pugwash River of Nova Scotia, formed by a dam to provide power for McArthur's saw mill. The dam had no ladder, so fish could not make their way up the river, and the lake was heavily polluted by sawdust.
Canada	Ontario	48.206111°N 81.215555°W	McArthur Lake	About 40 kilometres (25 mi) south of the city of Timmins. The lake has a rocky shoreline with three main bays and thirteen islands. The west side has more than 20 camps and cottages. Used for kayaking, boating and fishing for walleye and northern pike.
Canada	Quebec	45.7080555°N 75.6702778°W	Lac McArthur	In the Outaouais region of Quebec. Fed by the Rivière Blanche from Lac Saint-Pierre and empties into Lac Grand to the southeast.
Canada	Quebec	45.8447°N 75.8586°W	Lac McArthur	Also in the Outaouais, at an elevation of 333 metres (1,093 ft). Near to Denholm and the Réserve écologique André-Linteau.
Canada	Saskatchewan	57.7625°N 105.051944°W	McArthur Lake	The term "McArthur Lake" is sometimes used to refer to the McArthur River uranium mine, operated by Cameco. However, this "lake" is not recognized in the official Gazetteer of Canada as of 1998.
Canada	Saskatchewan	52.564332°N 104.353997°W	McArthur Lake	To the east of Pleasantdale, Saskatchewan. The surrounding area is mainly agricultural land.
Canada	Saskatchewan	55.25008°N 102.4004°W	McArthur Lake	About 30 kilometres (19 mi) east of Pelican Narrows at an elevation of 328 metres (1,076 ft). The lake is near Attitti Lake. McArthur Lake, Robbestad Lake and the northern part of Kakinagimak Lake drain northward via the Nemei River into Churchill River.
United States	Idaho	48.513894°N 116.449696°W	McArthur Lake	On Deep Creek. The riparian zones are protected by the 1,207 acres (488 ha) McArthur Lake Wildlife Management Area.
United States	North Carolina	35.3413°N 78.0147°W	McArthur Lake	Small lake in Goldsboro, North Carolina.
United States	North Carolina	35.1833°N 79.2576°W	McArthur Lake	Fort Bragg, North Carolina. Has a length of 1,137 feet (347 m), covers 29 acres (12 ha) and has an average depth of about 10 feet (3.0 m). Fish include largemouth bass, bluegill, redear sunfish, warmouth, flier, pickerel and bullhead catfish.

== Gallery ==
MacArthurs Lake locations in Nova Scotia
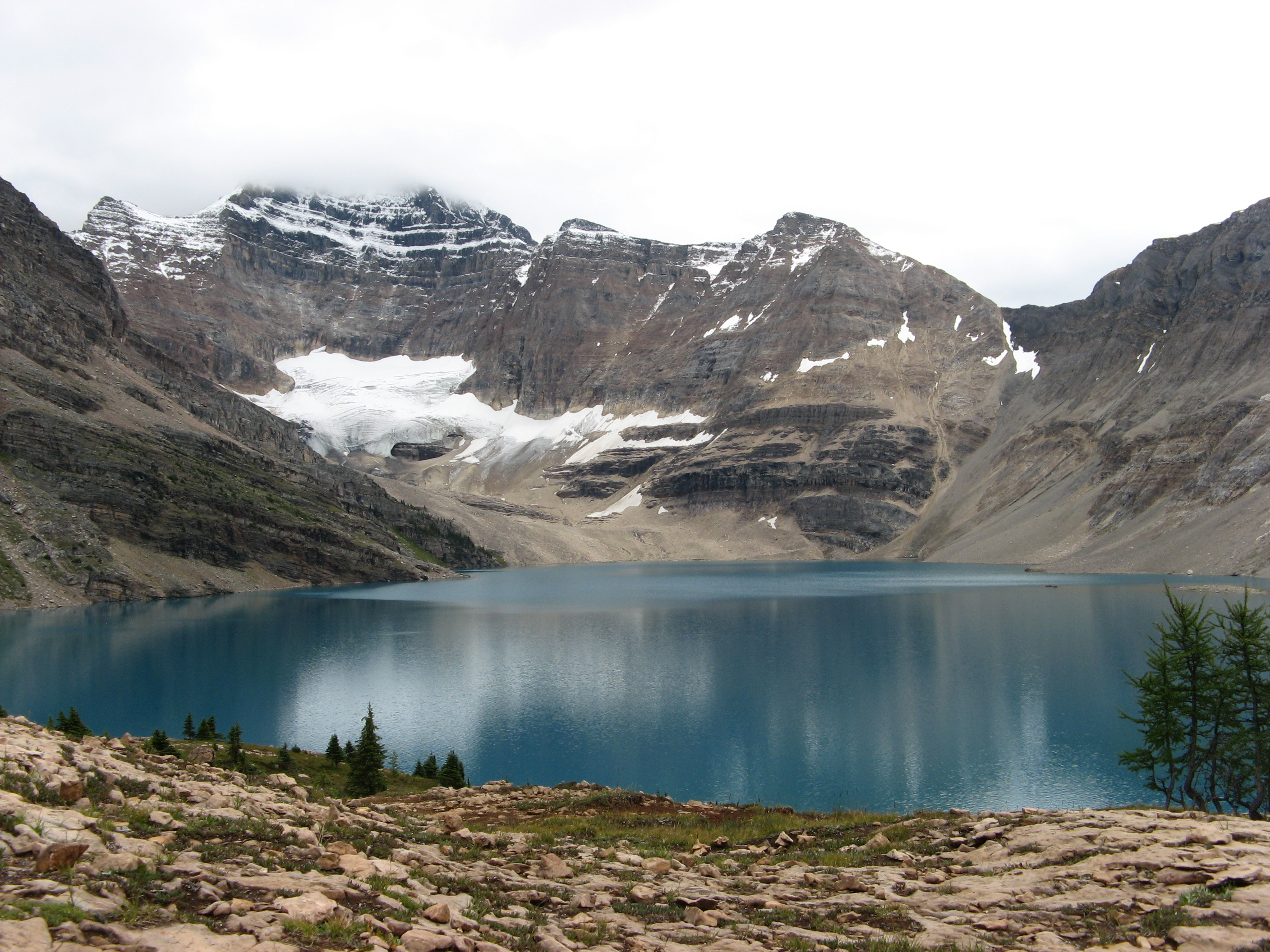
Lake McArthur, Yoho National Park

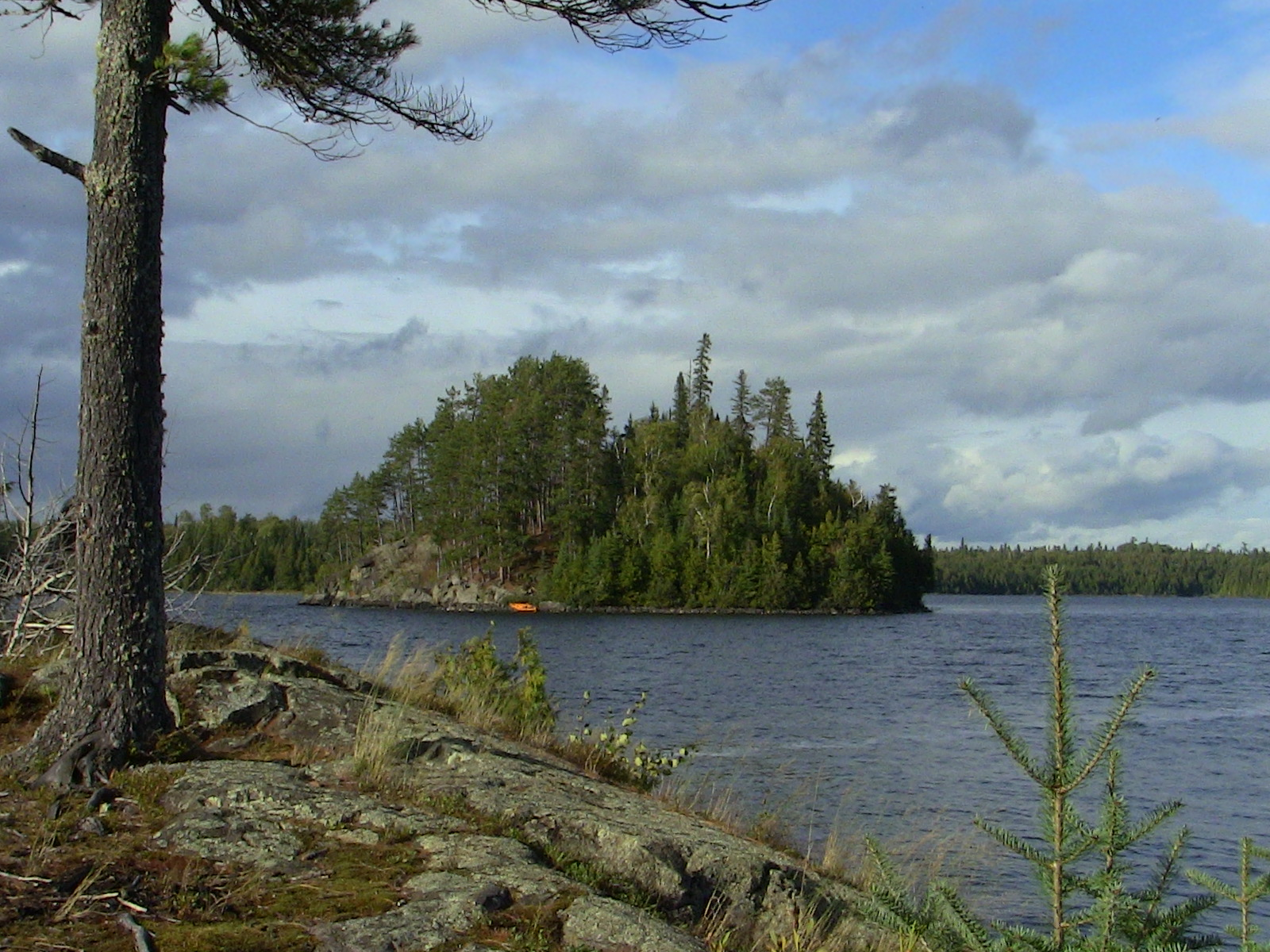
McArthur Lake, Ontario

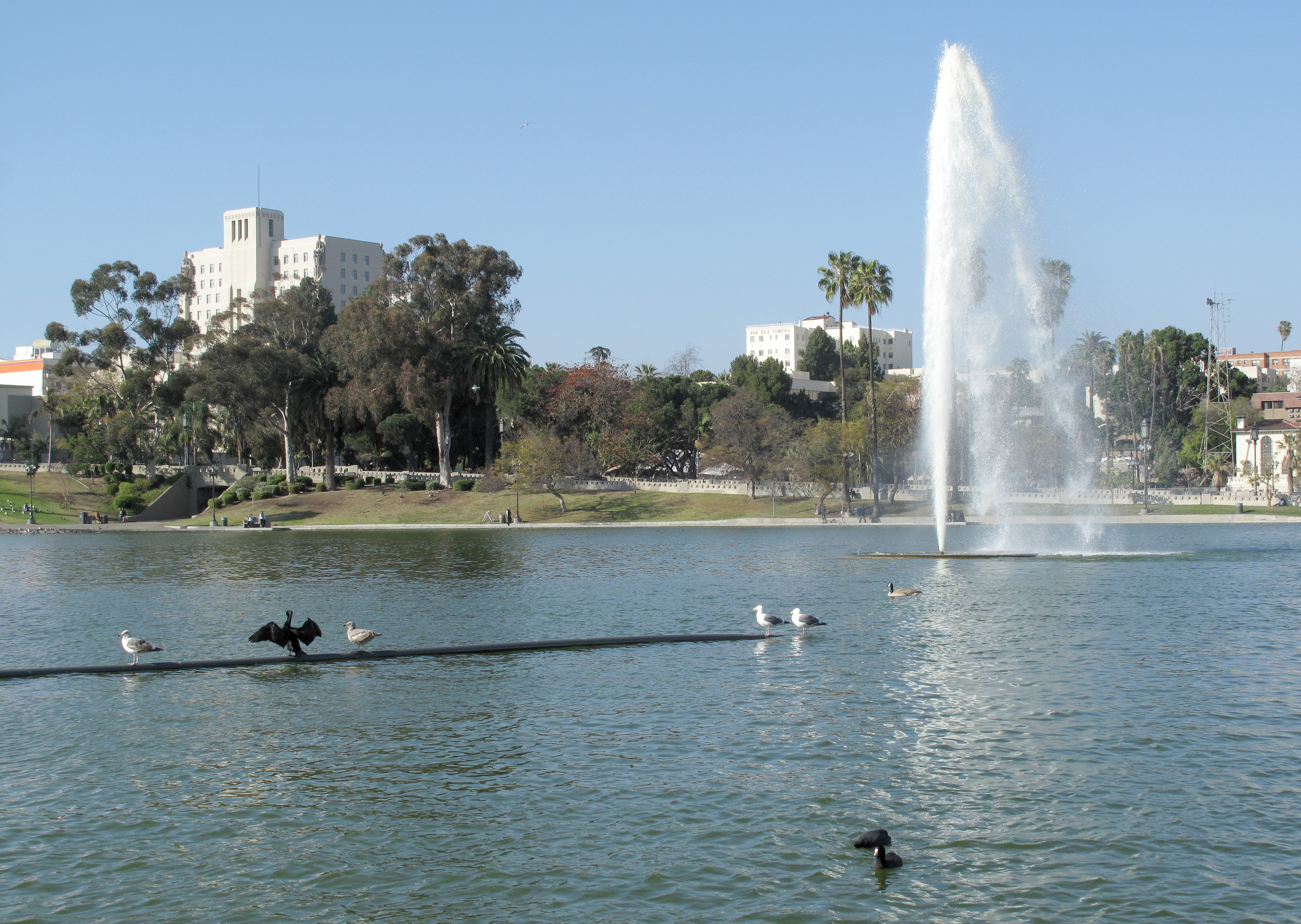
The lake in MacArthur Park, Los Angeles

== Sources ==
- Faubert, Victor Maurice (2008), MacArthurs Lake
- Fuller, W. A. (September 1999), "Samuel Hearne's Track: Some Obscurities Clarified", Arctic, 52 (3), Arctic Institute of North America, doi:10.14430/arctic931, JSTOR 40511778
- Garcier, Romain (Autumn 2009), "The nuclear 'renaissance' and the geography of the uranium fuel cycle", Geography, 94 (3), Geographical Association, JSTOR 41555382
- Lac McArthur (PDF) (in French), Fédération des Lacs de Val-des-Monts
- Leigh (18 November 2013), "The Hike To Lake McArthur, Lake O'Hara Region, Yoho NP", hikebiketravel.com
- Macumber, Phillip G. (1991), Interactions between groundwater and surface systems in northern Victoria., Department of Conservation and Environment, State of Victoria, ISBN 0724197168
- "McArthur Lake", Mapio
- McArthur Lake Wildlife Management Area, Idaho Fish and Game Watchable Wildlife Program
- Vieth, Fred. H.D. (1884), Report upon the Condition of the Rivers in Nova Scotia (PDF)
