= Raak Plain boinka =

Raak Plain Boinka
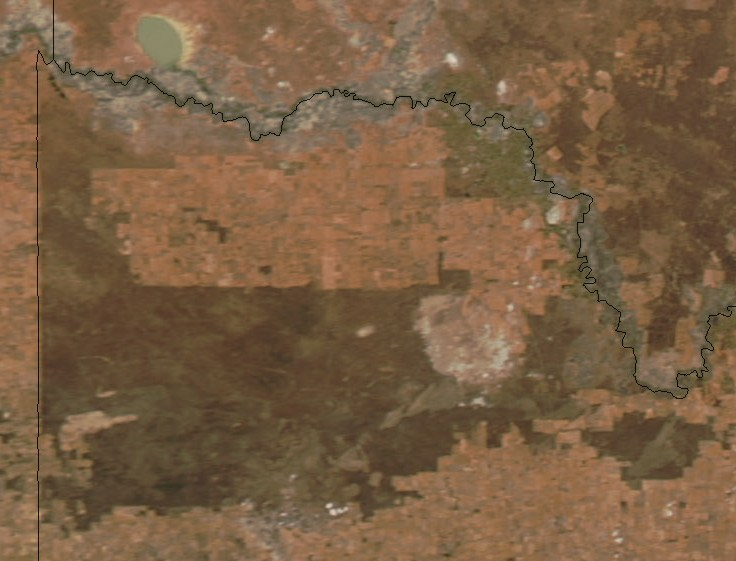
- NASA image. The darker green area to the west and center is the Murray-Sunset National Park. To its east the roughly circular light-colored area is the Raak boinka. East of this is the Hattah-Kulkyne National Park and the Murray River.

- Coordinates: 34.637916564°S 141.966812133°E
- Country: Australia
- State: Victoria
- Region: Murray Mallee

Area
  - Total: 400 km^{2} (150 sq mi)

The Raak Plain Boinka is a wilderness area in the state of Victoria, Australia. The boinka (Note: A "boinka" is a landform complex where groundwater is discharged, and may include dunes, gypsum flats and salt lakes. Boinkas occupy shallow depressions in flat, semi-arid areas.) groundwater discharge complex is a shallow depression within a region of Mallee dune fields, and contains gypsum flats and salinas, pools of salty water that are mainly fed by groundwater. The distinctive flora of the boinka is largely intact and includes several threatened species.

== Location ==
The Raak Plain boinka (Note: Phillip Macumber uses the term "Raak boinka" for the whole complex and limits the term "Raak Plain" to the extensive gypsum flat of the western quarter of the boinka. Others use the term "Raak Plain Boinka" for the whole discharge system.) is the largest boinka in the Murray River basin at about 500 square kilometres (190 sq mi), and is an excellent example of a rare type of geological formation. It is 16 kilometres (9.9 mi) northwest of Hattah, Victoria. The boinka complex lies to the east of the Sunset Strip, a NE-SW trending elevated block on the west of the Danyo Fault. The boinka is north of Mount Cowra and Wymlet. The Calder Highway running from north to south through Nowingi defines the eastern boundary. The Hattah-Kulkyne National Park lies to the east of the highway. The boinka lies within part of the Murray Mallee plain. There is a fringe of Lowan Mallee along its south edge.

== Terrain ==
Raak Plains and Pink Lakes, further west in Murray-Sunset National Park, are outstanding examples of the boinka landform complex of sandplains, gypsum flats, gypsite hills, salinas (Note: There is little agreement about the terminology that should be used to describe evaporitic inland basins, which include a wide variety of hydrologic and geologic conditions. Terms used in the United States include playa, salina, alkali lake, salt lake, playa lake, dry lake, salt pan and wetland. Michael R. Rosen states that in Australia "salt pan" means "playa" while "Salina" refers to a coastal salt lake, usually wet. Phillip G. Macumber in his major study of Interactions between groundwater and surface systems in northern Victoria (1991) says a halite salina is an ephemerally wet playa lake. This article follows Macumber and uses the terms "lake" or "salina" for the saline lakes in the boinka.) and source-bordering dunes. The country is extremely rugged, and contains a system of saline blue lakes formed by water that discharges from below ground. The discharge complex, which Phillip Macumber calls the "Raak boinka", is a broad depression with a distinctive outer boundary and markedly different appearance from the aeolian Mallee landscapes that surround it. It includes dunes and islands of sand and gypsum clay, plains of sand, clay and limestone, gypsum flats and halite salinas in the lowest parts.

The depression is bounded by the 40 metres (130 ft) contour. The floor of the boinka is 15 to 20 metres (49 to 66 ft) below the Mallee dunefields that surround it. In the west there is a sharply defined boundary between the gypsum flats and salinas of the boinka and the dune fields. To the east the boundary is less distinct as aeolian sands from within the boinka merge into the linear dunefields. The plain includes a number of islands that rise above the flats, and are parts of the linear dunefield that were cut off from the Mallee as the discharge zone expanded. There are small salinas to the west of the plain, near the rim of the basin.

The Raak Plain holds the largest groundwater discharge in the state. There are more than 50 naturally "playas", or saline lakes, and gypseous saltmarsh plains. Probably most of the reflux brine was collected when the climate was wetter than it is today, and most recharge now comes from the main Raak salina when it is filled with rainwater. MacArthur's Lake is an example of a small salina in the southeast of the Raak boinka. It is covered with a shallow sheet of water in the winter, but dries out in warmer weather. Salinity in the lake rises from 149,000 mg/L in July to 206,000 mg/L in September due to evaporative concentration. By January the water table is 2 to 13 centimetres (0.79 to 5.12 in) below the lake floor. The salinity of the lake water is about 3.5 times that of the groundwater.

The Raak boinka is underlain by Blanchetown Clay. Soils are mostly loose red-brown sands that form dunes in the central part of the plain. Seasonally saturated saline soils predominate in a large part of the west of the plain. The ages of source bordering gypsum dunes in the Raak boinka have been determined using Optically stimulated luminescence (OSL). They were formed between 20,000 and 35,000 years ago, and between 70,000 and 85,000 years ago. One of the dunes was dated to around 127,000 years ago.

== Human presence ==
There are a number of Aboriginal cultural heritage sites in the boinka, including large sites with artifacts, ovens and middens. Velesunio shells dated to around 7,650 years ago have been found at an aboriginal campsite near the west of the Raak boinka, along with many artifacts and hearths. The shells indicate the presence of fresh water nearby. However, even though the Mallee was wetter at the time, it is underlaid by groundwater brines, so pools would have been salty. Possibly the freshwater was found in dune soaks, where rainwater filtering through the dune is trapped by a clay layer at its base. Another explanation could be that the shells were brought from a larger Hattah Lake system immediately to the east of the Raak boinka.

Some of the land is freehold, and some is State Forest used for grazing and salt mining under lease. About 18% of the boinka is used for grazing, mostly around Nowingi in the northeast. Gypsum is mined in Victoria for use as soil conditioner and for plaster and plasterboard in the construction industry. Brunswick Plaster Mills used to operate a railway to transport gypsum from the Raak Plain to the Victorian Railways interchange siding at Nowingi. The rusty remains of a fuel tanker truck that blew up when transporting diesel to the Brunswick Plaster Mills gypsum mine can still be seen on the northern edge of the Raak Plain.

== Environment ==
The west of the boinka is contained within the east of the Murray-Sunset National Park. The Raak Plain Reference Area, covering 15.43 square kilometres (5.96 sq mi) of the plain, has been designated IUCN category Ia (Strict Nature Reserve) as of 1996. It is managed by the Department of Environment, Land, Water and Planning of the State of Victoria. The Raak Plain Reference Area is within the Murray-Sunset National Park.

Annual rainfall is about 250 millimetres (9.8 in), and annual evaporation is about 2,500 millimetres (98 in), with groundwater outcrop making up the difference. Since the natural salinity of the region makes in unsuitable for agriculture, about 82% of the original habitat remains. The natural vegetation is diverse and includes Samphire (Tecticornia) and Low Chenopod Shrubland. Threatened birds include Regent parrot (Polytelis anthopeplus monarchoides) and Malleefowl (Leipoa ocellata). Threatened plants include Bead Glasswort (Tecticornia flabelliformis), Purple Swainson-pea (Swainsona purpurea), Mallee Hemichroa (Hemichroa diandra) and Spiked Pigweed (Dysphania simulans). A Directory of Important Wetlands in Australia lists about 40 individual wetlands totalling more than 600 hectares (1,500 acres).

The Raak Plain is threatened by rabbits, which selectively graze saplings of the buloke woodland communities and thus prevent regeneration. The ground-dwelling threatened Mallee birds are the target of predation by foxes. In 2004 there was controversy over a proposal for an industrial waste storage site near Mildura on the edge of the plain, which could contaminate the groundwater.

== Sources ==
- Bennet, Martin (September 2010), "Raak Plain Truck Wreck", DeviantArt
- Dwyer, Sean; Leamon, Amy (17 March 2017), 6 – Raak Plain: Regional Catchment Strategy Implementation Plan (PDF), Mallee Catchment Management Authority
- Eggleton, Richard A., ed. (2001), THE REGOLITH GLOSSARY: surficial geology, soils and landscapes (PDF), Cooperative Research Centre for Landscape Evolution and Mineral Exploration, ISBN 0-7315-3343-7
- Hattah-Kulkyne National Park and Murray-Kulkyne Park Visitor Guide (PDF), Parks Victoria
- Macumber, Phillip G. (1991), Interactions between groundwater and surface systems in northern Victoria., Department of Conservation and Environment, State of Victoria, ISBN 0724197168
- Mallee Invasive Plants and Animals Management Strategy, Mallee Catchment Management Authority, 19 March 2012, ISBN 978-1-920777-22-7
- Mallee Parks Management Plan (PDF), Parks Victoria, September 1996
- Mehlman, David (7 September 2017), "Y 109 Known as 'The Thing'", DeviantArt
- Munro, Catharine (28 August 2004), Salt of the earth, The Age Company Ltd.
- Murray-Sunset National Park, Parks Victoria
- Raak Plain in Australia, Protected Planet
- Rosen, Michael R. (1 January 1994), Paleoclimate and Basin Evolution of Playa Systems, Geological Society of America, ISBN 978-0-8137-2289-4
- Smith, Barton Leslie (2004), Optically Stimulated Luminescence Dating of Quaternary Landforms in the Murray Basin, Southeastern Australia, La Trobe University
- "Uses of Public Land", River Red Gum Forests Investigation (PDF) (Discussion Paper), Victorian Environmental Assessment Council, 2006
