= Skučas =

Skučas is a surname. Notable people with the surname include:

- Artūras Skučas (born 1961), Lithuanian writer
- Kazys Skučas (1894–1941), Lithuanian politician and
- Kęstutis Skučas (born 1967), Lithuanian athlete
- Žygimantas Skučas (born 1992), Lithuanian basketball player
