= MacArthur =

MacArthur or Macarthur may refer to:

== Arts and media ==
- INSS MacArthur, a fictional starship featured in the science fiction novel The Mote in God's Eye
- MacArthur (1977 film), a movie biography of General of the Army Douglas MacArthur
- MacArthur (1999 film), a two-part television documentary film about Douglas MacArthur
- Macarthur (novel), a novel by Bob Ong

== People ==
- Clan Arthur (also known as Clan MacArthur), a Scottish clan
- MacArthur (surname), people with the surname MacArthur

== Places ==
=== Australia ===
- Macarthur, Australian Capital Territory, a suburb of Canberra, ACT, Australia
- Macarthur, New South Wales, a region of south-western Sydney, NSW, Australia
- Macarthur, Victoria, a town in the Western District of the state of Victoria, Australia

=== Other countries ===
- MacArthur, Leyte, a municipality in the province of Leyte, Philippines
- MacArthur, West Virginia, a census-designated place in the state of West Virginia, U.S.

== Sport ==
- Macarthur Rams FC, an Australian semi-professional football club based in Campbelltown, New South Wales, Australia
- Macarthur FC, an Australian professional football club based in South Western Sydney, New South Wales

== Other uses ==
- Division of Macarthur, an electoral division in regional New South Wales, Australia
- Fort MacArthur, a former military base in Los Angeles, US
- Long Island MacArthur Airport, Suffolk County, New York, US
- MacArthur Center, shopping mall in Norfolk, Virginia, US
- MacArthur Foundation, private, independent grantmaking institution
  - MacArthur Fellows Program, fellowship/grant awarded by the MacArthur Foundation
- MacArthur Freeway, segment of Interstate 580
- MacArthur Highway, a highway in the Philippines
- Macarthur railway station, a train station in Macarthur, NSW, Australia
- UWS Macarthur, a former campus of Western Sydney University

== See also ==
- General MacArthur, Eastern Samar, a municipality in the Philippines
- John D. MacArthur Beach State Park, West Palm Beach, Florida
- McArthur (disambiguation)
- MacArthur Boulevard (disambiguation), multiple uses
- MacArthur Park, western Los Angeles, California
  - "MacArthur Park" (song), a song based on the Los Angeles park
