= McArthur =

McArthur may refer to:

== People ==
- McArthur (surname)

== Geography ==
- McArthur, Arkansas, an unincorporated town in Desha County
- McArthur, California, in Shasta County
- McArthur, Modoc County, California
- McArthur, Ohio
- McArthur Basin, a large intracratonic sedimentary basin in northern Australia
- McArthur Lake (disambiguation)
- McArthur River, Northern Territory, Australia
- McArthur River uranium mine, Saskatchewan, Canada
- McArthur River zinc mine, Northern Territory, Australia
- McArthur Township, Logan County, Ohio

== Ships ==
- USC&GS McArthur (1874)
- NOAAS McArthur (S 330) (formerly USC&GS McArthur)
- NOAAS McArthur II (R 330)
- MV McArthur, a private maritime security ship in service since 2007

== Other uses ==
- "McArthur" (song), by Hardy, Eric Church, Morgan Wallen and Tim McGraw
- McArthur Court, an arena at the University of Oregon campus in Eugene
- McArthur Glen Designer Outlet Wales, a commercial development consisting of around 90 different stores

== See also ==
- MacArthur (disambiguation)
