= Val-des-Monts =

- Municipality
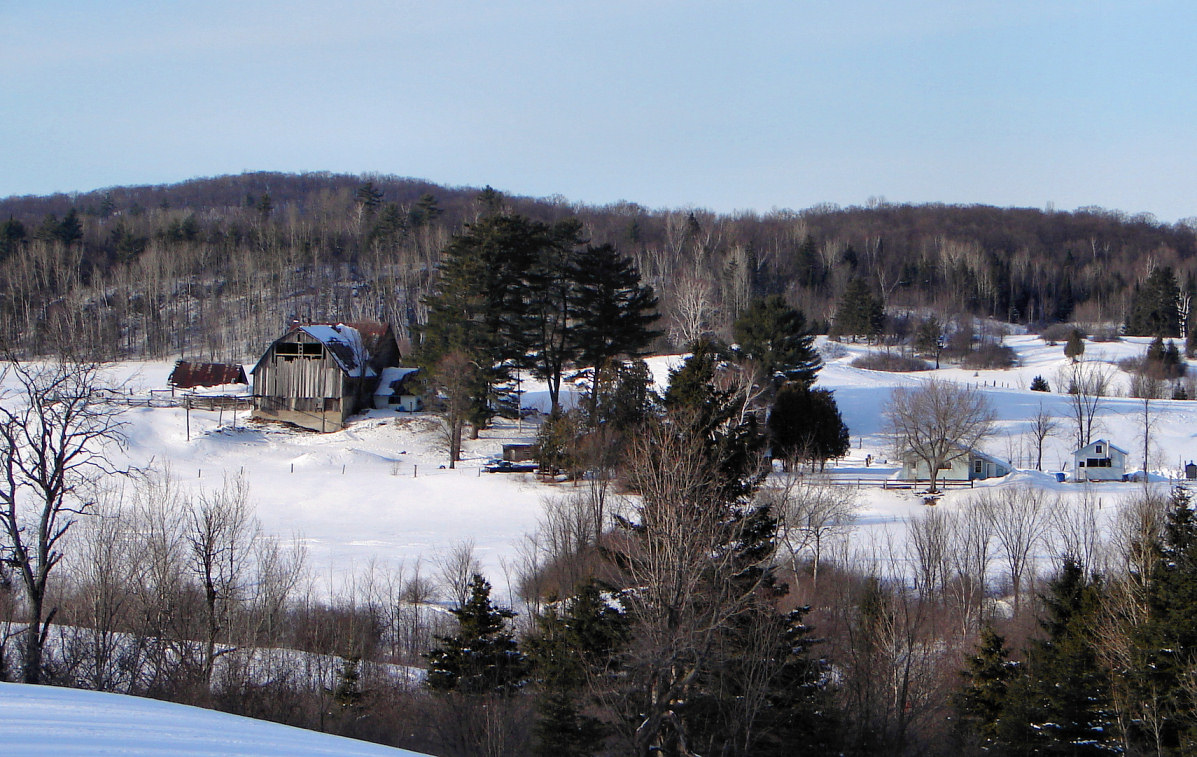
- Rural neighborhood in Val-des-Monts

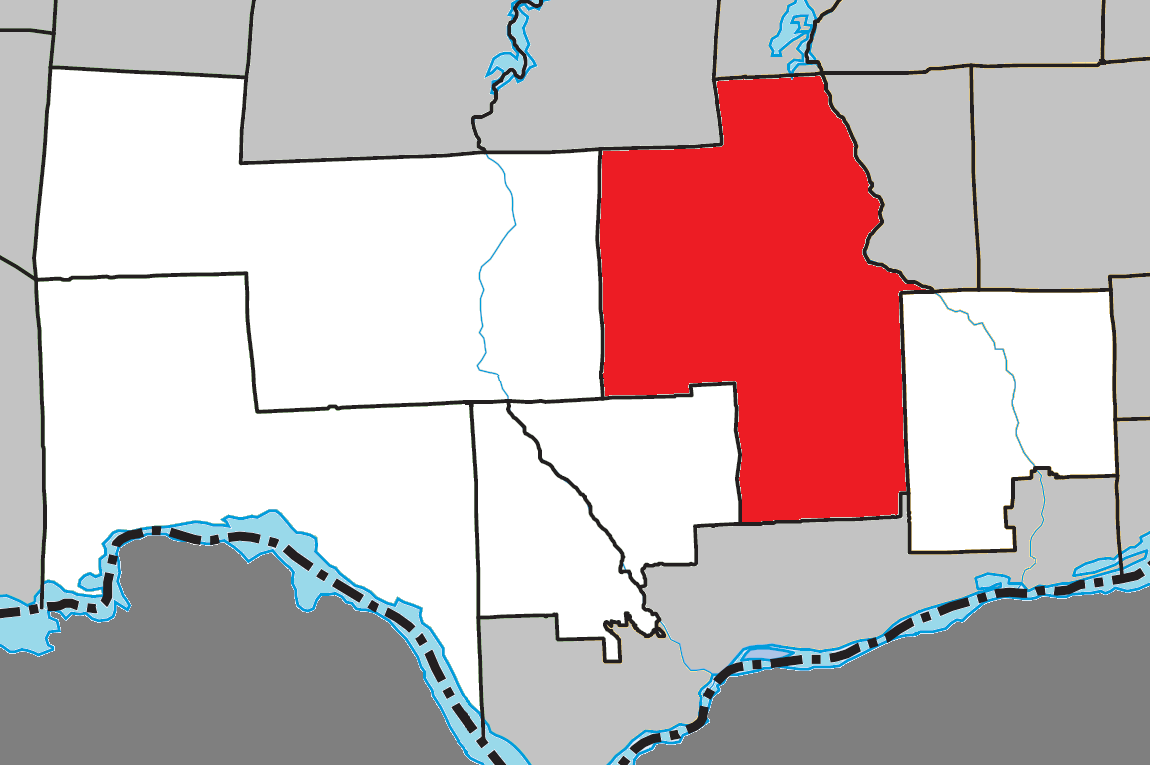
- Location within Les Collines-de-l'Outaouais RCM

- Location in western Quebec
- Coordinates: 45°39′N 75°40′W
- Country: Canada
- Province: Quebec
- Region: Outaouais
- RCM: Les Collines-de-l'Outaouais
- Constituted: January 1, 1975

Government
  - Mayor: Joëlle Gauthier
  - Federal riding: Argenteuil—La Petite-Nation
  - Prov. riding: Gatineau

Area
  - Total: 481.40 km^{2} (185.87 sq mi)
  - Land: 434.77 km^{2} (167.87 sq mi)

Population (2021)
  - Total: 13,328
  - Density: 30.7/km^{2} (80/sq mi)
  - Pop 2016-2021: ▲15.1%
  - Dwellings: 7,002
- Time zone: UTC−05:00 (EST)
  - Summer (DST): UTC−04:00 (EDT)
- Postal code(s): J8N 4E9
- Area code: 819
- Highways: R-307; R-366
- Website: www.val-des-monts.net

Val-des-Monts (French pronunciation: [val de mɔ̃]) is a municipality in the Outaouais region of Quebec, Canada, located about 40 km (25 mi) north of Ottawa, Ontario. It has a population of 13,328 residents in 2021. Formed in 1975 by the merger of the towns of Perkins, Saint-Pierre-de-Wakefield and Poltimore, it consists mainly of farms and mountainous forests. Many of its residents commute to Ottawa or Gatineau for work. Due to its numerous lakes, its population is boosted during summers by people living in cottages. Most of the people in Val-des-Monts live in the village of Perkins.

== Toponymy ==
The name of Val-des-Monts is from the French words Val which means "small valley" and Monts which means "mounts". This name is a reference to the fact that the territory of the municipality includes several valleys and mountains.

== Geography ==
The municipality of Val-des-Monts is located at approximately 10 km north of Gatineau and 220 km west of Montreal. It is part of Les Collines-de-l'Outaouais Regional County Municipality within Outaouais region. It is also part of the National Capital Region which includes Ottawa and Gatineau as well as some adjacent municipalities.

The territory of Val-des-Monts is composed mainly of lakes, farming lands and forests. The largest lakes are McGregor, Grand, l'Écluse and Newcombe.

The municipality of Val-des-Monts shares its borders with the municipalities of Denholm and Bowman to the north, Notre-Dame-de-la-Salette and L'Ange-Gardien to the east, La Pêche to the west, and Cantley and Gatineau to the south.

The two main highways crossing Val-des-Monts are provincial highways 307 and 366. The municipal road network includes more than 270 km of roads.

== History ==
The first settlers of the territory of Val-des-Monts arrived during the 19th century. From 1878 the region was booming economically, thanks to the discovery of phosphate. From 1892 the phosphate production began decreasing while the mica production began to develop. The Blackburn brothers' mine that was located to the northeast of Perkins was recognized as the biggest mica mine in Canada. At end of the 1910s the mica production was falling. At this time, after having exploited the mining and forestry resources, the inhabitants started to leave the region.

The municipality of Val-des-Monts was created in 1975 by the merging of the municipalities of Perkins, Saint-Pierre-de-Wakefield and Poltimore. Nowadays it is mainly the attraction of living around the lakes that is drawing a large part of the population.

On June 23, 2010, at 1:41 p.m. ET, a magnitude 5.0 earthquake hit Val-des-Monts. The earthquake was felt as far away as Montreal, Boston and Cleveland.

== Demographics ==
Historical census populations – Val-des-Mont, Quebec
Year	Pop.	±%
1986	4,353	—
1991	5,551	+27.5%
1996	7,231	+30.3%
2001	7,842	+8.4%
2006	9,539	+21.6%
2011	10,420	+9.2%
2016	11,582	+11.2%
2021	13,328	+15.1%

Canada census – Val-des-Monts community profile

	2021	2016	2011
Population	13,328 (15.1% from 2016)	11,582 (11.2% from 2011)	10,420 (9.2% from 2006)
Land area	434.77 km^{2} (167.87 sq mi)	441.84 km^{2} (170.60 sq mi)	439.12 km^{2} (169.55 sq mi)
Population density	30.7/km^{2} (80/sq mi)	26.2/km^{2} (68/sq mi)	23.7/km^{2} (61/sq mi)
Median age	40.4 (M: 41.2, F: 40.0)	40.2 (M: 40.6, F: 39.8)	40.0 (M: 40.4, F: 39.5)
Private dwellings	7,002 (total)	6,418 (total)	5,972 (total)
Median household income	$101,000	$83,872	$79,816

References: 2021 2016 2011

=== Languages ===
According to the 2021 Canadian Census by Statistics Canada, 62% of Val-des-Monts' population speak both official languages of Canada while 32% speak only French and 6% speak only English.

At home, 84% speak only French, 13% only English, and 2% both English and French. Beside the language spoken the most often at home, 6% also speak English and 3% also speak French.

Among the population who worked, 68.9% use French most often at work, 24.5% English, and 6.5% both English and French. Beside the language spoken the most often at work, 34.9% also use English and 15.6% also use French.

Canada Census Mother Tongue - Val-des-Monts, Quebec
Census	Total	French			English			French & English			Other		
Year	Responses	Count	Trend	Pop %	Count	Trend	Pop %	Count	Trend	Pop %	Count	Trend	Pop %
2021	13,325	11,150	▲10.9%	83.7%	1,485	▲28.6%	11.1%	375	▲114.3%	2.8%	265	▲65.6%	2.0%
2016	11,580	10,055	▲12.6%	86.8%	1,155	▼4.5%	10.0%	175	▲29.6%	1.5%	160	▲39.1%	1.4%
2011	10,420	8,930	▲9.7%	85.7%	1,210	▲6.1%	11.6%	135	▲68.8%	1.3%	115	▼34.3%	1.1%
2006	9,540	8,140	▲19.3%	85.3%	1,140	▲33.3%	11.9%	80	▼20.0%	0.8%	175	▲191.7%	1.8%
2001	7,845	6,825	▲14.6%	87.0%	855	▼24.0%	11.0%	100	▼4.8%	1.3%	60	▲71.4%	0.8%
1996	7,230	5,955	n/a	82.4%	1,125	n/a	15.6%	105	n/a	1.5%	35	n/a	0.5%

== Local government ==
Val-des-Monts federal election results
Year	Liberal		Conservative		Bloc Québécois		New Democratic		Green	
2021	39%	2,349	17%	997	24%	1,457	10%	586	2%	148
2019	46%	2,726	13%	762	24%	1,401	9%	543	7%	388

Val-des-Monts provincial election results
Year	CAQ		Liberal		QC solidaire		Parti Québécois	
2018	43%	2,066	25%	1,196	16%	758	11%	518
2014	16%	771	57%	2,784	7%	320	20%	948

Currently, Val-des-Monts is a part of the federal electoral district of Argenteuil—La Petite-Nation, after the 2022 Canadian federal electoral redistribution. The municipality formed the riding Pontiac and has been represented by Sophie Chatel of the Liberal Party in the 44th Parliament of Canada. Provincially, Val-des-Monts is part of the Gatineau electoral district and is represented by Robert Bussière of the Coalition Avenir Québec since 2018.

== Mayors ==
List of mayors of Val-des-Monts since 2005 and the year of their election:

- Marc Carrière (2005)
- Jean Lafrenière (2008 and 2009)
- Jacques Laurin (2013 and 2017)

== Tourism ==
Val-des-Monts is part of the Outaouais touristic region. The main touristic attractions are outdoors activities, campgrounds and snowmobile trails. The municipality is also known for fishing since it has 125 lakes suitable for fishing.

Every year since 2011, Val-des-Monts has hosted a country music festival.

== Gallery ==
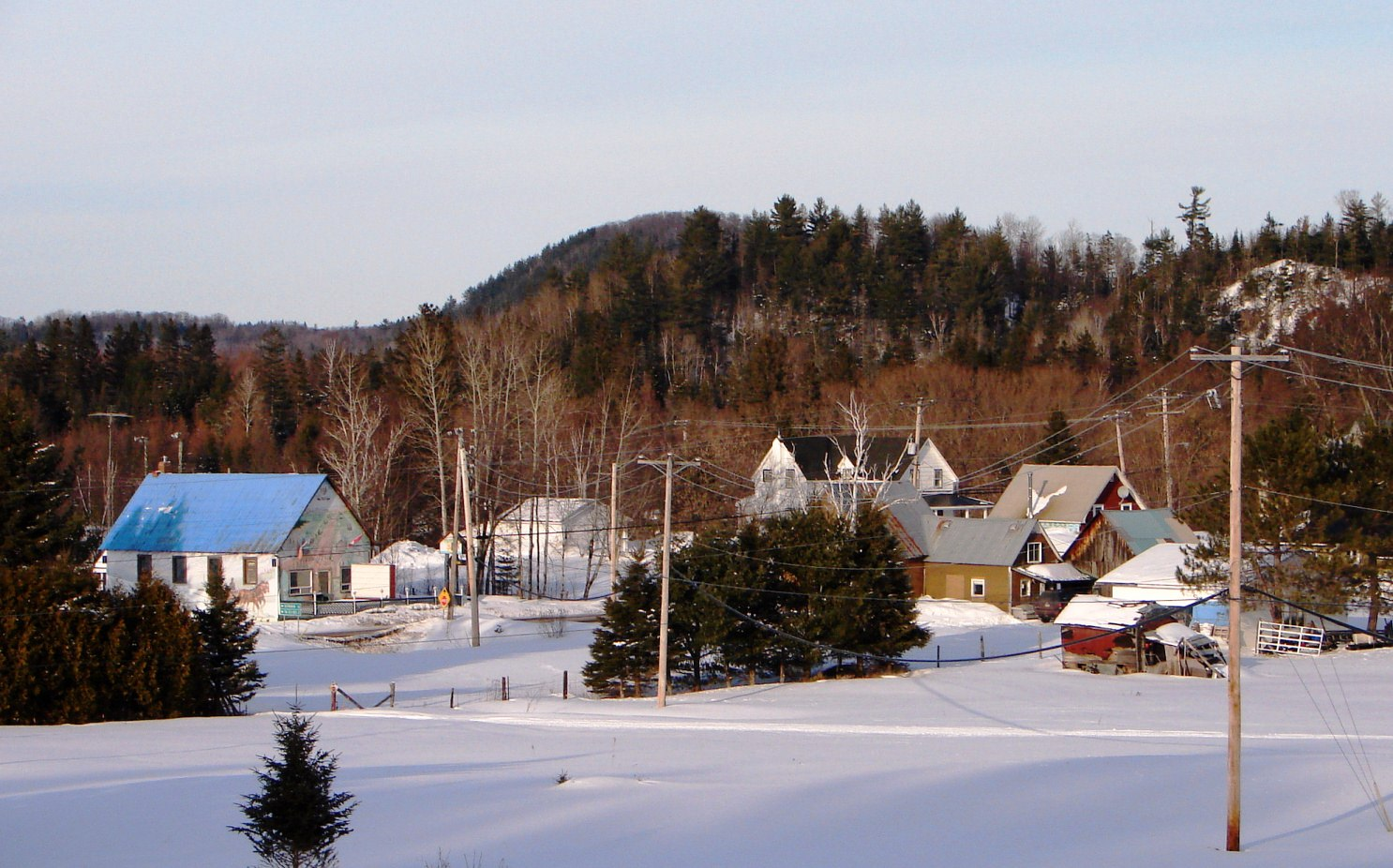
Poltimore

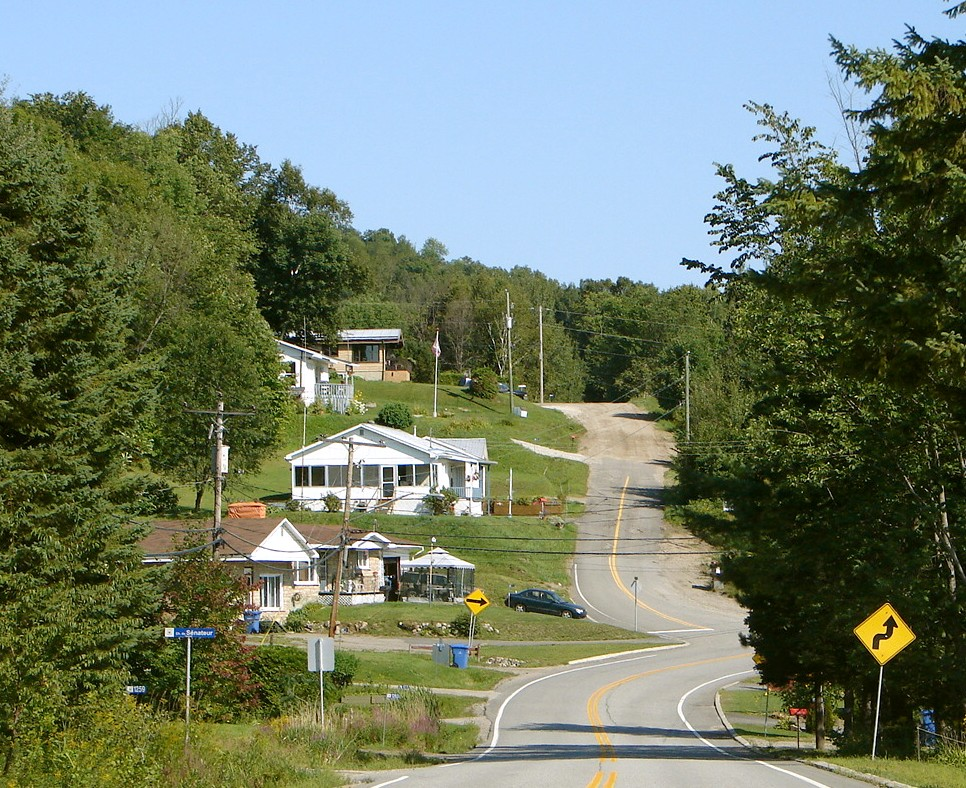
St-Pierre-de-Wakefield

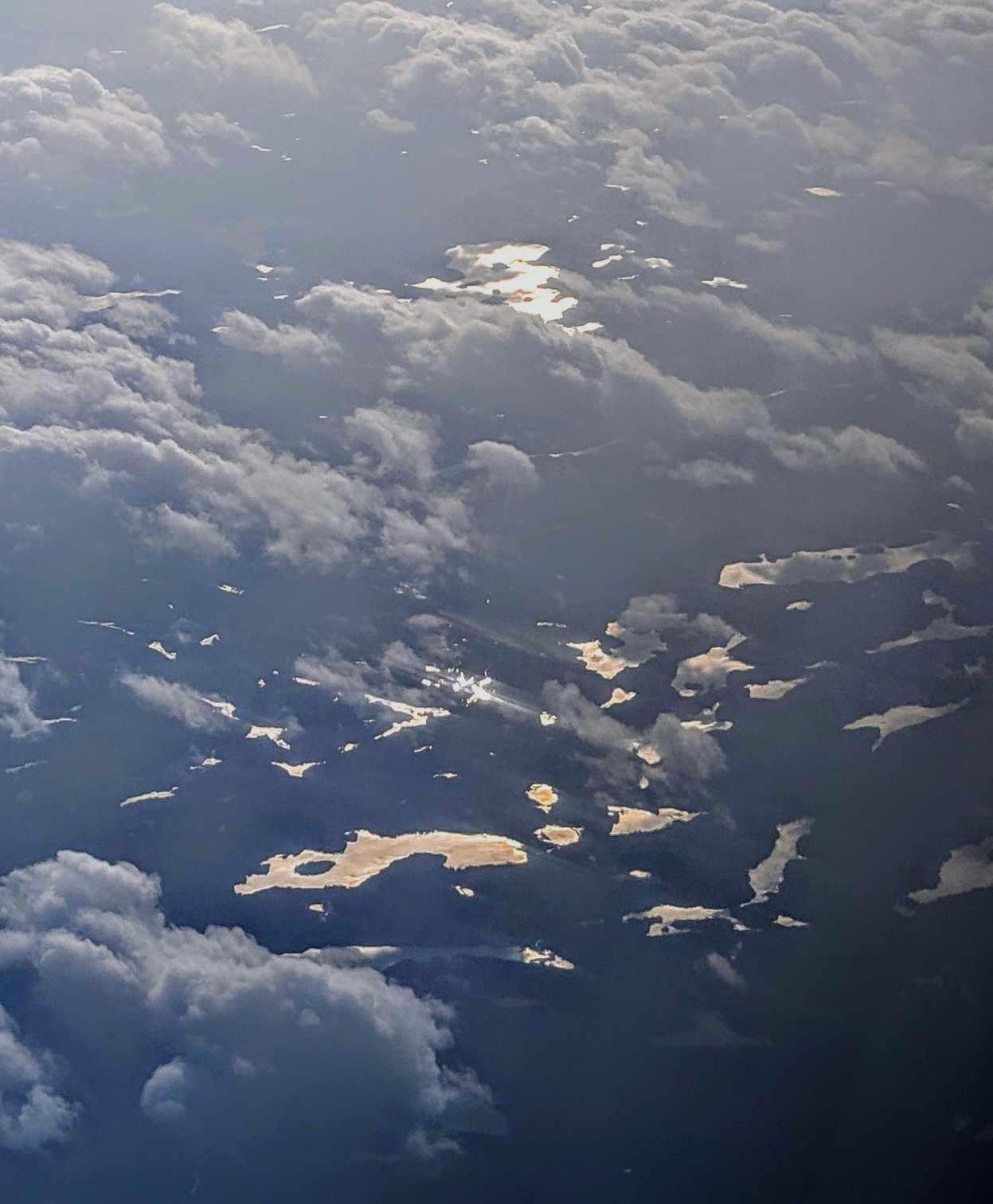
Lac Clair and other lakes

== See also ==
- List of anglophone communities in Quebec
- List of lakes in Val-des-Monts, Quebec
- List of municipalities in Quebec
