= Alexander McArthur (disambiguation) =

Alexander McArthur (1814–1909) was an Irish-born Australian and British businessman and politician.

Alexander McArthur may also refer to:

- Alex McArthur (born 1957) an American actor
- Alexander McArthur, unemployed worker and co-author of 1935 novel No Mean City

== See also ==
- McArthur (surname)
- Laurie McArthur (Lawrence Alexander McArthur, 1930–1996), Australian politician, son of Alexander McArthur
