= Artūrs =

Masculine given name

Artūrs or Arturs is a given name. Notable people with the name include:

- Arturs Alberings (1876–1934), former Prime Minister of Latvia
- Artūrs Ausējs (born 1990), Latvian basketball player
- Artūrs Bērziņš (born 1988), Latvian basketball player
- Artūrs Brūniņš (born 1982), Latvian basketball player
- Artūrs Cavara (1901–1979), Latvian operatic tenor
- Artūrs Garonskis (born 1957), Latvian and Soviet rower
- Artūrs Irbe (born 1967), Latvian and Soviet ice hockey goaltender
- Artūrs Karašausks (born 1992), Latvian footballer
- Arturs Krišjānis Kariņš (born 1964), Latvian politician
- Artūrs Kulda (born 1988), Latvian ice hockey player
- Artūrs Kupaks (born 1973), Latvian ice hockey player
- Artūrs Kurucs (born 2000), Latvian basketball player
- Artūrs Rubiks (born 1970), Latvian politician
- Artūrs Silagailis (born 1987), Latvian football defender
- Artūrs Šilovs (born 2001), Latvian ice hockey goaltender
- Artūrs Skrastiņš (born 1974), Latvian actor
- Arturs Sproģis (1904–1980), Latvian colonel and commander of the Soviet partisans during the occupation of Latvia by Nazi Germany in World War II
- Artūrs Štālbergs (born 1984), Latvian basketball player
- Artūrs Strautiņš (born 1998), Latvian basketball player
- Artūrs Strēlnieks (born 1985), Latvian basketball player
- Artūrs Vaičulis (born 1990), Latvian footballer
- Artūrs Vāvere (born 1965), Latvian sexologist
- Artūrs Visockis-Rubenis (born 1985), Latvian basketball coach
- Artūrs Žagars (born 2000), Latvian basketball player
- Artūrs Zakreševskis (born 1971), Latvian footballer
- Artūrs Zjuzins (born 1991), Latvian football midfielder
