= Arthur Parker =

Arthur Parker may refer to:

- Arthur C. Parker (1881–1955), archaeologist
- Arthur Jeph Parker (1923–2002), set decorator
- Arthur L. Parker (1885–1945), American businessman and inventor
- Arthur Parker (footballer, born 1878) (1878–?), English footballer
- Arthur Parker (footballer, born 2006), English footballer
