= McArthur (surname) =

McArthur is a surname of Scottish and Irish origin. It comes from the Celtic personal name Arthur. It denotes the 'son of Arthur', which means noble one.

Notable people with the surname include:

- Alexander McArthur (disambiguation)
- Barry McArthur (born 1947), English footballer
- Bruce McArthur (born 1951), Canadian serial killer
- Charles McArthur (1844–1910), British maritime insurance specialist and Liberal Unionist politician from Liverpool, MP between 1897 and 1910
- Daniel McArthur (1867–1943), Scottish footballer
- Duncan McArthur (1772–1839), 11th Governor of Ohio
- Duncan McArthur (Canadian politician) (1885–1943), politician in Ontario
- Frederick John McArthur, Canadian politician
- Gale McArthur (1929–2020), All-American basketball player
- James McArthur (born 1987), Scottish footballer
- John McArthur (1826–1906), Union general during the American Civil War
- Katherine McArthur (born 1971), American astronaut
- Kathleen McArthur (1915–2000), Australian environmental activist
- Ken McArthur (1881–1960), South African athlete
- Lewis A. McArthur (1883–1951), American businessman, geographer and author
- Lewis Linn McArthur (1843–1897), American newspaper publisher and Oregon Supreme Court Justice
- Michael McArthur, American singer-songwriter, guitarist, and record producer
- Nancy McArthur (1931–2020), American children's author
- Piera McArthur (1929–2025), British-born New Zealand painter
- Reginald McArthur (1954–2018), American singer, member of the R&B group the Controllers
- Stewart McArthur (born 1937), Australian politician
- Wally McArthur (disambiguation)
- William Pope McArthur (1814–1850), a United States Coast Survey officer
- William S. McArthur (born 1951), American astronaut

== See also ==
- Clan Arthur
- MacArthur (surname)
