= Artūrs Vāvere =

Latvian sexologist (born 1965)

- Born: March 17, 1965 (age 60); Riga, Latvia
- Occupation: sexologist

Artūrs Vāvere (born March 17, 1965, in Riga is a Latvian sexologist.

In 1997 Dr. Vāvere became head of the civic organization "The Latvian Association for Safe Sex". With the support of the European Union the association started free testing for HIV/AIDS. In 1998, with the help of the Soros Fund, the Latvian AIDS internet portal www.aids.lv was opened.

Since 1998 Dr. Vāvere has turned his attention to issues of men's sexual equality in Latvia. He publishes the booklets Man at the Age of Puberty and A Man. Since 2000 he has been head of the Institute of Men's Sexual Health.
