= Artūras Barysas =

Lithuanian actor (1954–2005)

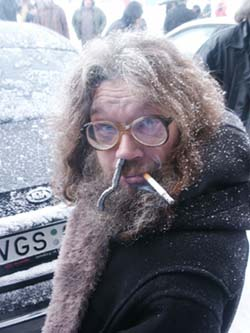
- Barysas "Baras" in 2004
- Born: May 10, 1954; Panevėžys, Lithuania
- Died: January 27, 2005 (aged 50); Vilnius, Lithuania
- Occupations: Filmmaker, artist, musician
- Spouse: Nijolė Barysienė
- Children: 1
- Writing career
- Genre: Cinema
- Notable awards: Už nuopelnus scenai (2006)
- Movement: Avant-garde cinema

Artūras Barysas "Baras" (May 10, 1954 – January 28, 2005) was a Lithuanian actor, singer, photographer, and filmmaker, known as a member of the counter-culture and the father of modern Lithuanian avant-garde.

== Biography ==
As a teenager moved from Panevėžys to Vilnius, where finished the school 22 in Antakalnis. In 8th grade entered moviemaking circle in a Pioneers Palace. After the school attempted to enter Moscow institute of cinematography, but was rejected because of strong myopia.

In Soviet period lived on sight-disability pension and reselling of rare books and Western music records. Actively participated in underground culture of Lithuania. In late years suffered from alcoholism. He died in his sleep.

== Film works ==
The debut film Alchemy, made by Barysas and his class-mates, won a prise of Moscow festival of amateur filmmakers. After the school Barysas entered the Lithuanian union of amateur filmmakers, where he administrated festivals and presented Lithuanians at festivals in other republics of USSR.

The position of official amateur allowed to evade censure, but at the same time to reach an audience in regular festivals all over USSR. Thus the Barysas' film He is wanted shows hippies, transvestite and nude scenes and Her love tells about gerontophilic relations, all of which was not allowed in Soviet professional movies. The filmmakers union also provided cameras and other gear.

After the end of Soviet era, with popularisation of video-cameras, Barysas left the filmmaking and switched to music career in post-punk band I.V.T.K.Y.G.Y.G..

== Music career ==
He was a vocalist of an avant-garde band I.V.T.K.Y.G.Y.G. (Ir Visa Tai Kas Yra Gražu Yra Gražu, "And Everything That Is Beautiful, Is Beautiful").

== Roles ==
Barysas often played the main roles in his own films (He is wanted, B. and Ch., This sweet word). In 1989 he also performed the main character in Vidmantas Gaigalas' film The only child (Vienturtis).

== Filmography ==
- 2003: I dream and am (Sapnuoju ir esu)
- 2000: Perception (Suvokimas; A. Barysas, Artūras ir Rimas Šlipavičiai, Andrius Radziukynas; 15 min.)
- 1984: Men (Vyrai; A. Barysas, A. Pročkys; lost)
- 1984: Car incident (Autoavarija; A. Barysas, A. Pročkys; lost)
- 1983: Features to a portrait of an artist (Štrichai aktoriaus portretui; A. Barysas, A. Pročkys, V. Blažys; 5 min.)
- 1982: Obvious and yet incredible (Akivaizdu, bet neįtikėtina; A. Barysas, A. Pročkys; 6 min.)
- 1982: Two in the forest (Dviese miške; A. Barysas, G. Zinkevičius, E. Lapinskas; 7 min.)
- 1982: Intelektuali popietė (A. Barysas, A. Pročkys; 2 min.)
- 1982: About those two from there (Apie tuos du iš ten; A. Barysas, Ž. Jelinskas, A. Pročkys; 13 min.)
- 1981: Essay (Esė; A. Barysas, J. Štrengė; 5 min.)
- 1981: Reason (Prasmė; A. Barysas, J. Čergelis, A. Pročkys; 4 min.)
- 1981: Applause lingers a moment (Aplodismentai trunka akimirką; A. Barysas, A. Pročkys; 8 min.)
- 1980: He's wanted (Jo ieško; A. Barysas, A. Slavinskas, J. Čergelis, A. Pročkys, A. Vaitkus, A. Kulikauskas, G. Zinkevičius; 38 min.)
- 1980: We (Mes; A. Barysas, A. Pročkys, A. Slavinskas, E. Lapinskas; 8 min.)
- 1979: Dokumentalnij film (A. Barysas, J. Čergelis; 3 min.)
- 1979: Better than paradise, worse than hell (Geriau už rojų, blogiau už pragarą; A. Barysas, A. Slavinskas, J. Čergelis; 3 min.)
- 1979: Her love (Jos meilė; A. Barysas, A. Slavinskas, J. Čergelis, A. Rečiūnas; 25 min.)
- 1979: A day of centuries (Diena iš šimtmečių; A. Barysas, A. Rečiūnas; 10 min; neišlikęs)
- 1978: Snow (Sniegas; A. Barysas, A. Vaitkus, J. Čergelis, A. Slavinskas; 3 min.)
- 1978: A joke about a meter (Anekdotas apie metrą; A. Barysas, A. Vaitkus; 2 min.)
- 1978: To speak only truth (Sakyti tik tiesą; A. Barysas, D. Buklis; 3 min.)
- 1978: B and Ch (B ir Č; A. Barysas, J. Čergelis; 12 min.)
- 1978: Fifteenth time (Penkioliktą kartą; lost)
- 1977: This sweet word (Tas saldus žodis; A. Barysas, D. Velička; 1 min.)
- 1977: Rimas, Renata, Romas (A. Barysas, A. Vaitkus; 4 min.)
- 1975: Those who don't know should ask those who know (Tie, kurie nežinote, paklauskite kitų; A. Barysas, S. Mackonis, J. Čergelis, A. Slavinskas; 5 min.)
- 1975: Stay at our slope (Pasibūkit mūsų kloniuos; lost)
- 1974: I vote for love (Balsuoju už meilę; A. Barysas, J. Čergelis; 5 min.)
- 1974: A thin one (Laina; A. Barysas, J. Čergelis; 6 min.)
- 1974: Green meadow (Žalias laukas; A. Barysas, J. Čergelis; 1 min.)
- 1972: Two times two (Du kart du; A. Barysas, D. Buklys, R. Vikšraitis; 4 min.)
- 1972: Victims of fashion (Madų aukos; A. Barysas, D. Buklys; 6 min.)
- 1972: A golden fish (Auksinė žuvelė; lost)
- 1972: Citius, altius, fortius (lost)
- 1972: The Earth, planet of humans (Žemė – žmonių planeta; lost)
- 1971: Salt and apples (Druska ir obuoliai; A. Barysas, D. Buklys, S. Šimkus; 3 min.)
- 1971: Falling (Kritimas; A. Barysas, D. Buklys, S. Šimkus; 3 min.)
- 1971: I hit the target (Kliudžiau; lost)
- 1970: To live (Gyventi; A. Barysas, D. Buklys, S. Šimkus; lost)
- 1970: Alchemy (Alchemija; A. Barysas, Donatas Buklys, Sigitas Šimkus; 3 min.)
