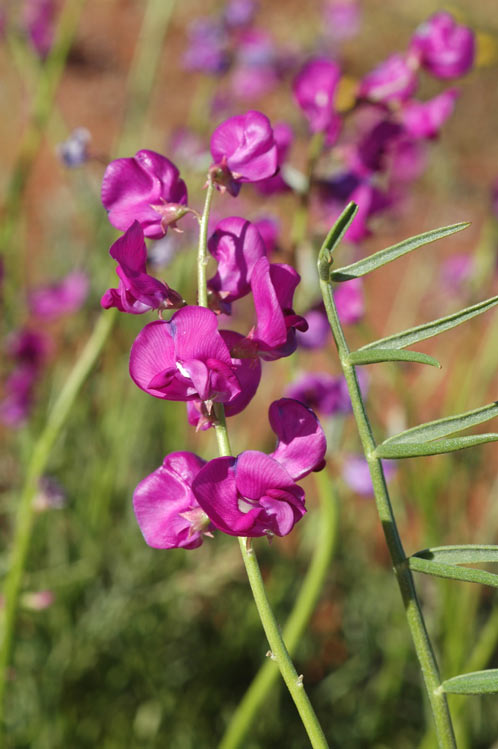
- Near Yalgoo

Scientific classification
- Kingdom: Plantae
- Clade: Tracheophytes
- Clade: Angiosperms
- Clade: Eudicots
- Clade: Rosids
- Order: Fabales
- Family: Fabaceae
- Subfamily: Faboideae
- Genus: Swainsona
- Species: S. purpurea

Binomial name
- Swainsona purpurea (A.T.Lee) Joy Thomps.

Synonyms
- Swainsona stipularis var. longialata A.T.Lee; Swainsona stipularis var. purpurea A.T.Lee

= Swainsona purpurea =

Species of legume

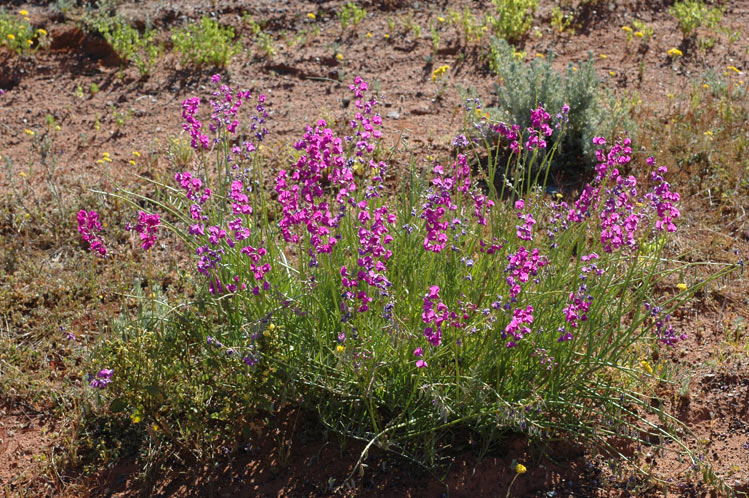
Habit near Yalgoo

Swainsona purpurea, commonly known as purple Swainson-pea or purple Darling pea, is a species of flowering plant in the family Fabaceae and is endemic to arid areas of inland Australia. It is an erect or spreading annual or perennial plant with imparipinnate leaves with 3 to 11 mostly linear or elliptic leaflets, and racemes of 3 to about 20 purple flowers.

== Description ==
Swainsona purpurea is an erect or spreading perennial or annual plant, that typically grows to a height of up to 30–50 cm (12–20 in) and has softly-hairy stems. The leaves are imparipinnate, mostly 30–120 mm (1.2–4.7 in) long with 3 to 11 linear or elliptic leaflets, the leaflets mostly 10–30 mm (0.39–1.18 in) long and 1–5 mm (0.039–0.197 in) wide. The flowers are arranged in racemes 50–300 mm (2.0–11.8 in) long of 3 to about 20, on a peduncle 0.5–4 mm (0.020–0.157 in) wide, each flower usually 12–14 mm (0.47–0.55 in) long. The sepals are joined at the base, forming a tube 1.5–2.5 mm (0.059–0.098 in) long with lobes much shorter than the sepal tube. The petals are purple, the standard petal mostly 10–15 mm (0.39–0.59 in) long and about as wide, the wings mostly 10–15 mm (0.39–0.59 in) long, and the keel about 10–13 mm (0.39–0.51 in) long and 3–5 mm (0.12–0.20 in) deep. Flowering occurs from August to October, and the fruit is a spindle-shaped to elliptic pod 10–60 mm (0.39–2.36 in) long with the remains of the style 6–8 mm (0.24–0.31 in) wide.

== Taxonomy and naming ==
This species was first formally described in 1948 by Alma Theodora Lee who gave it the name Swainsona stipularis var. purpurea in Contributions from the New South Wales National Herbarium. In 1990 Joy Thompson raised it to species status as S. purpurea in the journal Telopea. The specific epithet (purpurea) means "purple".

== Distribution and habitat ==
Swainsona purpurea grows in low-lying areas or on dunes, often near the edges of salt lakes and is widespread in inland Western Australia and South Australia, and in adjacent areas of the Northern Territory, Queensland and the far west of New South Wales.
