= Arthur Shapiro =

Arthur Shapiro may refer to:

- Arthur Shapiro (ecologist) (born 1946), professor of evolution and ecology at UC Davis
- Arthur Shapiro (vision scientist) (born 1964), American vision scientist known for creating optical illusions
- Arthur K. Shapiro (1923–1995), American psychiatrist known for his work on Tourette syndrome
- Arthur L. Shapiro (1942–1985), American lawyer and murder victim
- Artie Shapiro (1916–2003), American jazz bassist
