= Arthur "Daddy" Black =

American businessman and racketeer

Arthur James "Daddy" Black
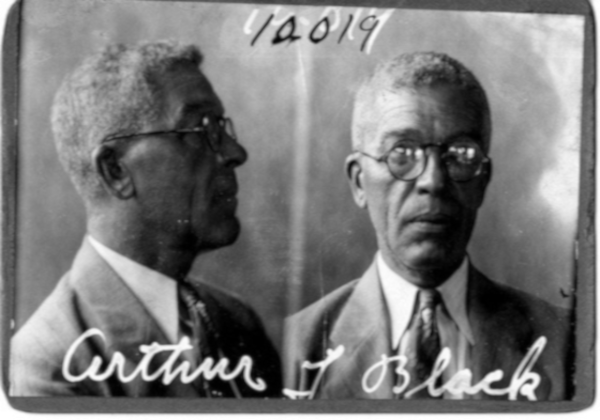
- Mugshot of Arthur James Black, a.k.a Daddy Black, 1932
- Born: July 24, 1877; Charleston, South Carolina
- Died: September 24, 1932 (aged 55)
- Occupations: manager and owner of two baseball teams
- Known for: the frontman for a numbers syndicate

Arthur James "Daddy" Black (July 24, 1877 – September 24, 1932) was a black businessman who came to prominence in Providence, Rhode Island in the 1920s as the manager and owner of two local baseball teams but also as the frontman for a numbers syndicate. In 1932, he was shot in his home by gunman. His death was originally thought to be as a result of a turf war, however, five men confessed to a robbery scheme. The subsequent murder trial was one of the most reported in Rhode Island history.

== Biography ==
Black was born on 24 July 1877 in Charleston, South Carolina. His family migrated to Rhode Island. His mother, Phebe, placed him and his three siblings in the Quaker-founded Shelter for Colored Children due to her financial and health issues. Within three years, her situation improved, and the four children returned to her care.

=== Reform School ===
In his late teens, Arthur was a cadet at the then-celebrated reform school, Sockanosset School for Boys. The paramilitary institution focused on education and vocational training (masonry, carpentry, blacksmithing, printing) to prepare boys for work after release. In 1896, the Deputy Superintendent appointed him to the rank of first Corporal of Company C. Many graduates transitioned directly into military service.

=== Navy Career ===
At age 19, he joined the United States Navy in 1899 at the start of the Spanish-American War. He served as a mess attendant and coal passer on the battleship Massachusetts. He transferred to the Pacific Fleet flagship, USS Brooklyn, which oversaw relief efforts in Hong Kong during the Boxer Rebellion. His 20-year Navy career took him all over the world. Still, the majority of his service was in the Atlantic and the West Indies, including Guantanamo Bay, Cuba, where he served as a Chief Machinist Mate. He also reportedly served at the Gatun Locks of the Panama Canal during construction. In 1919, he retired and returned to Providence, Rhode Island.

=== Prominent Businessman ===
During the 1920s, Black came to public attention as a businessman and the manager of the all-white Providence Monarchs baseball club.

In 1922, the Providence Journal reported on a minor traffic collision involving Black that was resolved amicably. Around the same time, he also gained publicity for exposing a corrupt policeman, who was subsequently suspended and tried for soliciting a bribe.

By the late 1920s, his influence extended into politics as well as business. In 1927, Rhode Island's Democratic State Central Committee appointed him to organize black voters for the Smith-Robinson ticket.

He applied his skills as a machinist to the building trades. Arthur joined the International Union of Steam and Operating Engineers in July 1925. He served on the stiff-leg crane teams at two Rhode Island architectural icons; the Industrial National Bank Building, and the Mount Hope Bridge. During his tenure he served as a walking agent of the Local 57. It is rumored that he aspired to a leadership position with a direct challenge of President and Business Manager, John A. White. He allowed his membership to lapse in 1932.

=== Baseball Owner ===
Arthur Black invested in semi-professional baseball clubs as early as 1924. Incorporation papers list him as a part-owner of the Cleveland Colored Giants, alongside white owners. In 1926, he acquired the Monarchs, a predominantly Irish team of the West End of Providence. In 1931, Black bought the Providence Colored Giants from his friend, and sports promoter, Daniel Whitehead. The team were often dubbed the "Daddy Black Giants." Under Black's ownership, the Providence Colored Giants was a formidable team. Black attracted top players to the team because he offered a weekly salary rather than a share of gate receipts. Players included Oliver "Ghost" Marcell, Luther Farrell, and Jesse Hubbard.

In 1931, the Giants earned the league title in the Boston Twilight League and helped dedicate Boston's first African American-owned sports venue, Lincoln Park. However, Black didn't make much money with the team and eventually sold it back to Whitehead.

=== Numbers racket ===
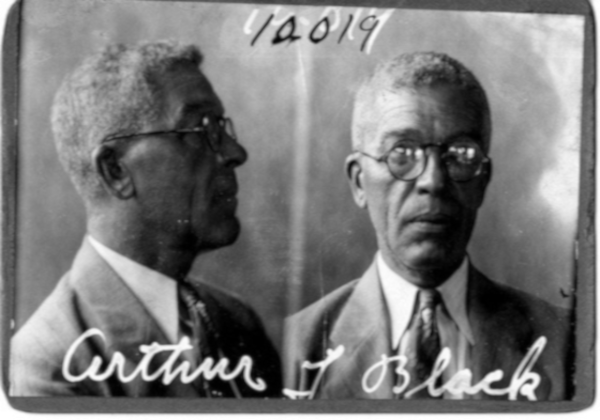
A daguerreotype mugshot of Arthur James Black, a.k.a. Daddy Black. Arrest, July 1932, Lottery Kingpin.

In the 1930s, Black was being referred to in the press as a "numbers king." Although, investigative journalist determined that he was only the frontman for two white men who actually owned and operated the syndicate.

In 1932, violence increased in Providence among rival gambling groups. The police raided Black's home as part of a crackdown on gang activity and illegal lotteries. In one raid, officers confiscated more than $5,000 in cash and charged Black and several associates with lottery-related offenses. The violent "numbers war" also attracted police and federal investigations into tax evasion and organized crime.

In one case, the Providence Sunday Journal described how Black personally paid the $75 fine for a "numbers runner".

Black was shot and killed on the evening of September 24, 1932, at his home office at 160 Cranston Street, Providence, when men entered his home and opened fire. His bodyguard was injured when he tried to protect Black. Black's wife called the police but Black died 45 minutes later at a local hospital.

Black was survived by his wife, two sisters and a brother. Black's funeral drew thousands in a large outpouring of grief. He was buried in his naval uniform, the uniform of a chief machinist's mate.

Black's widow, Luella, later lost a legal battle for an insurance payout, with the state supreme court ruling that his death had been the result of a crime.

== Trial ==
Black's murder drew significant public attention. The police initially suspected rival gangs were trying to seize control of Black's territory. However, when they questioned six suspects, five confessed to traveling to Providence to rob him. A sixth was charged as an accessory.

The subsequent trial was one of the most sensational in Rhode Island history. On November 15, 1932, the jury visited the crime scene. A number of eyewitnesses identified Webster Barnwell, as the actual defendant who fired the fatal shot. The defense argued that the police had coerced the confessions with physical threats and promises of leniency. The defense also asserted that the accused didn't intend to rob Black, but only wanted to ask for jobs. The jury found the five men guilty of first-degree murder and the sixth guilty of accessory. In December 1932, the judge sentenced all six to life imprisonment.

Black's killers were later paroled or had their sentences commuted by Governor J. Howard McGrath in 1945. Later news articles report that one of Black's former associates, Enrico Tameleo, went on to become prominent in the Patriarca crime family.

== Legacy ==
A year after his death, the local Elks lodge dedicated a tablet in Black's honor.
