= Arthur Parker (footballer, born 1878) =

English footballer

Personal information
- Date of birth: 1878
- Place of birth: Cleethorpes, England
- Position: Full-back

Senior career*
Years	Team	Apps	(Gls)
1895–1896	Grimsby Rovers		
1896–1898	Humber Rovers		
1898	Grimsby Town	1	(0)
1898–1???	Humber Rovers		
- * Club domestic league appearances and goals

Arthur Parker (1878 – after 1897) was an English professional footballer who played as a full-back.
