= MacArthur (surname) =

MacArthur or Macarthur is a surname, originating with the Scottish Clan MacArthur and now spread through English-speaking countries.

Notable people with the surname include:

== Business ==
- Catherine T. MacArthur (1909–1981), American businesswoman, philanthropist, wife of John D. MacArthur
- Elizabeth Macarthur (1766–1850), Australian businesswoman
- Hannibal Hawkins Macarthur (1788–1861), Australian businessman and politician
- J. Roderick MacArthur (1920–1984), American businessman and philanthropist
- John Macarthur (wool pioneer) (1767–1834), Australian businessman, politician, and soldier
- John D. MacArthur (1897–1978), American businessman and philanthropist

== Entertainment ==
- Charles MacArthur (1895–1956), American playwright and screenwriter
- James MacArthur (1937–2010), American actor
- Mary MacArthur (1930–1949), American actress

== Literature ==
- John F. MacArthur (1939–2025), American evangelical minister and author
- John R. MacArthur (born 1956), American journalist

== Military ==
- Arthur MacArthur, Jr. (1845–1912), American military leader and father of Douglas MacArthur
- Arthur MacArthur III (1876–1923), American naval officer and brother of Douglas MacArthur
- Douglas MacArthur (1880–1964), American military leader and U.S. Army General of the Army
- Edward Macarthur (1789–1872), Anglo-Australian general and administrator
- George MacArthur-Onslow (1875–1931), Australian general
- James Macarthur-Onslow (1867–1946), Australian general, politician and company director
- John Knox MacArthur (1891–1918), American military pilot

== Politics ==
- Arthur MacArthur, Sr. (1815–1896), American lawyer, judge, and politician
- Douglas MacArthur II (1909–1997), American diplomat
- James Macarthur (politician) (1798–1867), Australian pastoralist and politician in the colony of New South Wales

== Sports ==
- Clarke MacArthur born 1985), Canadian hockey player
- Ellen MacArthur (born 1976), British yachtswoman
- Mac MacArthur (1862–1932), Scottish baseball player

== Science ==
- John Stewart MacArthur (died 1920), chemist from Glasgow
- Robert MacArthur (1930–1972), American ecologist
- William Macarthur (1800–1882), Australian botanist and vigneron
- Judy MacArthur Clark, British veterinarian

== Other people ==
- Jean MacArthur (1898–2000), second wife of Douglas MacArthur
- David Macarthur, Australian professor of philosophy, University of Sydney
- Valena C. Jones (1872–1917) née Valena Cecilia MacArthur, American educator

== See also ==
- Arthur (surname)
- McArthur (surname)
