= Lac à la Perdrix =

Lake in Quebec, Canada

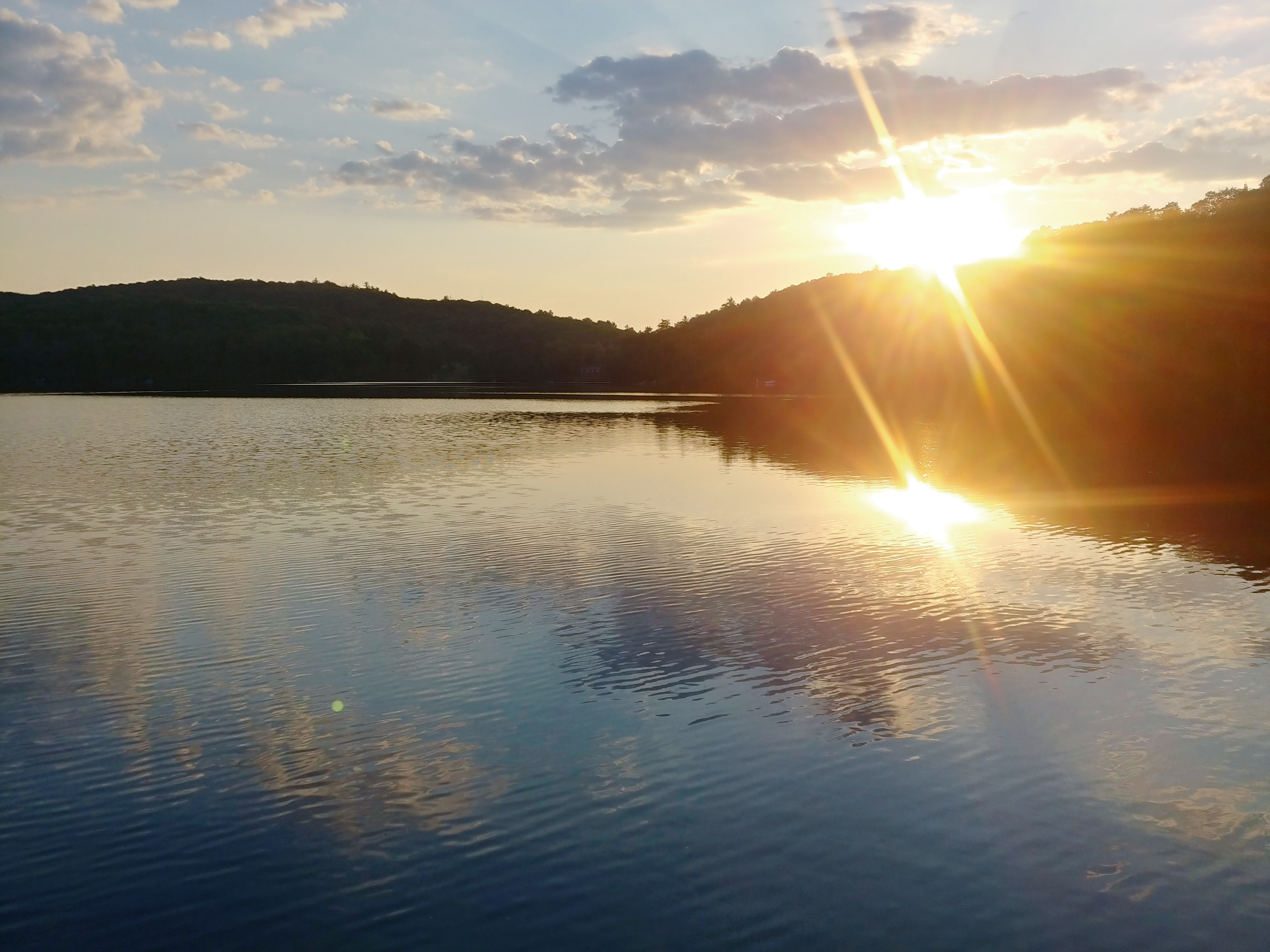

- Location within Quebec
- Location: Cantley, Quebec
- Coordinates: 45°35′37″N 75°41′05″W
- Basin countries: Canada
- Surface area: 0.44 km^{2} (0.17 sq mi)

Lac à la Perdrix is a lake in Cantley, Quebec, Canada, near the border with Ontario, north of Ottawa. It is about 15-20 minutes from Ottawa.
