= Wally McArthur =

Wally McArthur is the name of:

- Wally McArthur (footballer) (1912–1980), English Association (soccer) footballer
- Wally McArthur (rugby league) (1933–2015), Australian rugby league footballer
