= L'Ange-Gardien, Outaouais =

L'Ange-Gardien
- Municipality
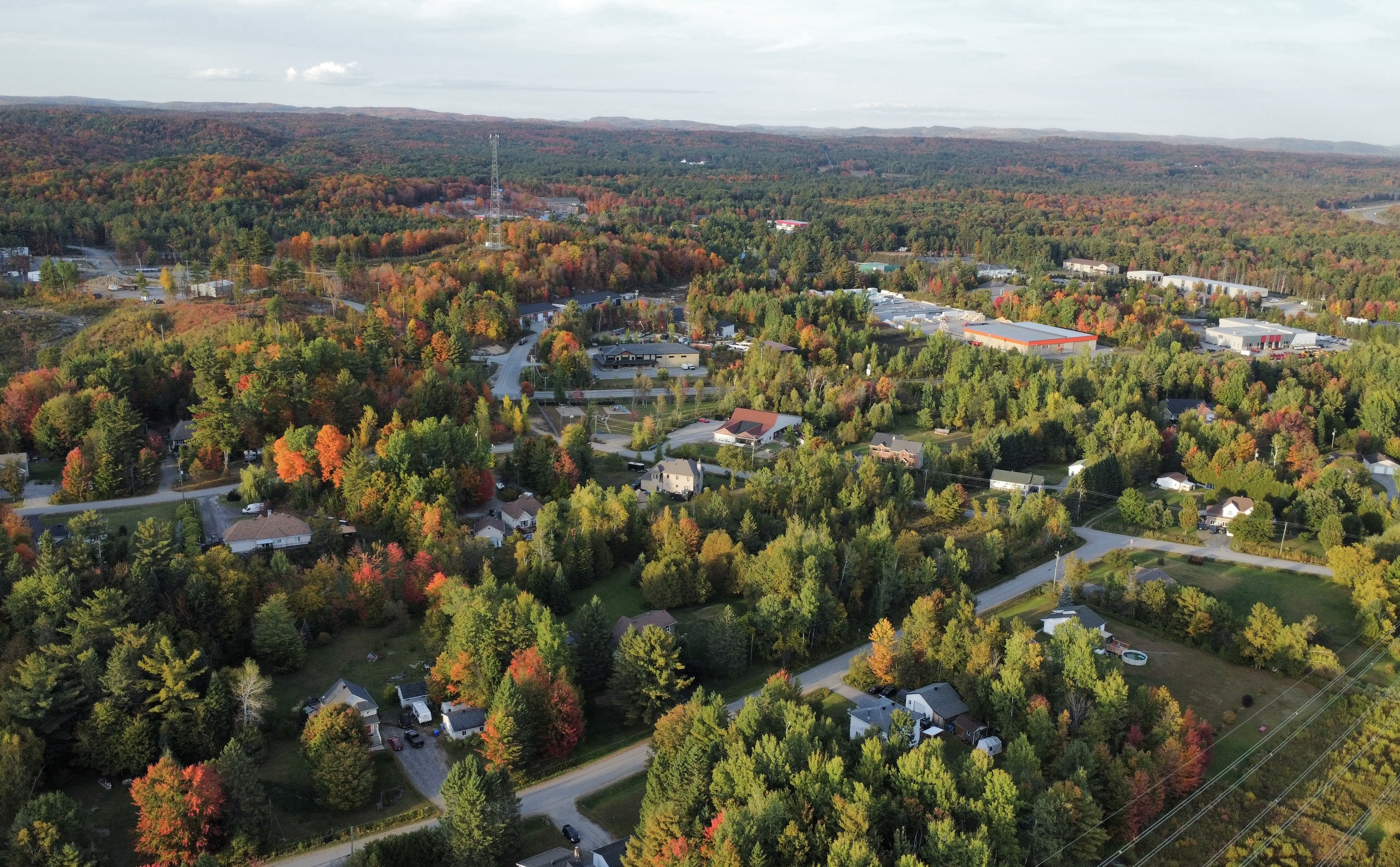
- Aerial View of L'Ange-Gardien

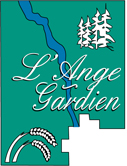
- Coat of arms

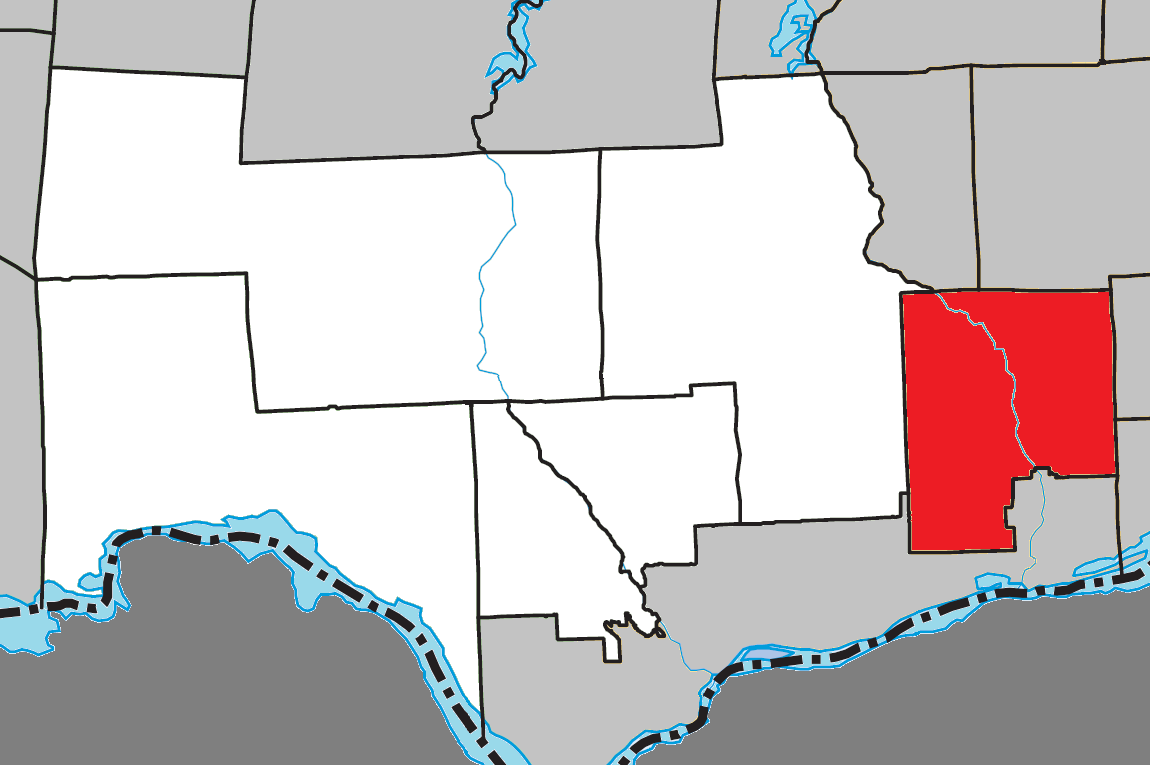
- Location within Les Collines-de-l'Outaouais RCM

- Location in western Quebec
- Coordinates: 45°35′N 75°27′W
- Country: Canada
- Province: Quebec
- Region: Outaouais
- RCM: Les Collines-de-l'Outaouais
- Constituted: May 17, 1979

Government
  - Mayor: Marc Louis-Seize
  - Federal riding: Argenteuil—La Petite-Nation
  - Prov. riding: Papineau

Area
  - Total: 224.15 km^{2} (86.54 sq mi)
  - Land: 216.05 km^{2} (83.42 sq mi)

Population (2021)
  - Total: 6,102
  - Density: 28.2/km^{2} (73/sq mi)
  - Pop 2016–2021: ▲11.7%
  - Dwellings: 2,288
- Time zone: UTC−5 (EST)
  - Summer (DST): UTC−4 (EDT)
- Postal code(s): J8L 0K8
- Area code: 819
- Highways: R-309; R-315

L'Ange-Gardien (French pronunciation: [lɑ̃ʒ ɡaʁdjɛ̃]; French for "the guardian angel") is a municipality in the Outaouais region of Quebec, Canada. It constitutes the easternmost part of Les Collines-de-l'Outaouais Regional County Municipality, north of the Buckingham Sector of the City of Gatineau.

The municipality straddles both sides of the Du Lièvre River. The following communities and villages are within its boundaries:

- Glen Almond
- Neilon
- Ribot

== History ==
In 1861, a parish municipality was formed and named L'Ange-Gardien. In 1869, a post office serving the parish and village was established. In 1881, it was separated from Buckingham Canton and formed into a parish municipality. In 1915, the village of Angers was separated from L'Ange-Gardien.

On January 1, 1975, L'Ange-Gardien, Buckingham, Masson, Notre-Dame-de-la-Salette, Angers, Buckingham-South-East, and Buckingham-South-West were merged to form the City of Buckingham, but because of adverse public reaction, the merger did not last long. On January 1, 1980, the former municipalities of West Buckingham, Buckingham Township, and L'Ange-Gardien Parish were reorganized into the Municipality of L'Ange-Gardien.

== Demographics ==
Canada census – L'Ange-Gardien community profile

	2021	2016	2011
Population	6,102 (+11.7% from 2016)	5,464 (8.2% from 2011)	5,051 (16.2% from 2006)
Land area	216.05 km^{2} (83.42 sq mi)	218.25 km^{2} (84.27 sq mi)	218.49 km^{2} (84.36 sq mi)
Population density	28.2/km^{2} (73/sq mi)	25.0/km^{2} (65/sq mi)	23.1/km^{2} (60/sq mi)
Median age	42.0 (M: 42.4, F: 41.6)	39.0 (M: 39.0, F: 39.0)	39.9 (M: 40.0, F: 39.9)
Private dwellings	2,288 (total) 2,176 (occupied)	2,058 (total)	1,952 (total)
Median household income	$118,000	$93,440	$87,509

References: 2021 2016 2011

Historical census populations – L'Ange-Gardien, Quebec
Year	Pop.	±%
1986	2,121	—
1991	2,815	+32.7%
1996	3,521	+25.1%
2001	3,610	+2.5%
2006	4,348	+20.4%
2011	5,051	+16.2%
2016	5,464	+8.2%
2021	6,102	+11.7%

Mother tongue:

- English as first language: 8.5%
- French as first language: 88.5%
- English and French as first language: 1.6%
- Other as first language: 1.2%

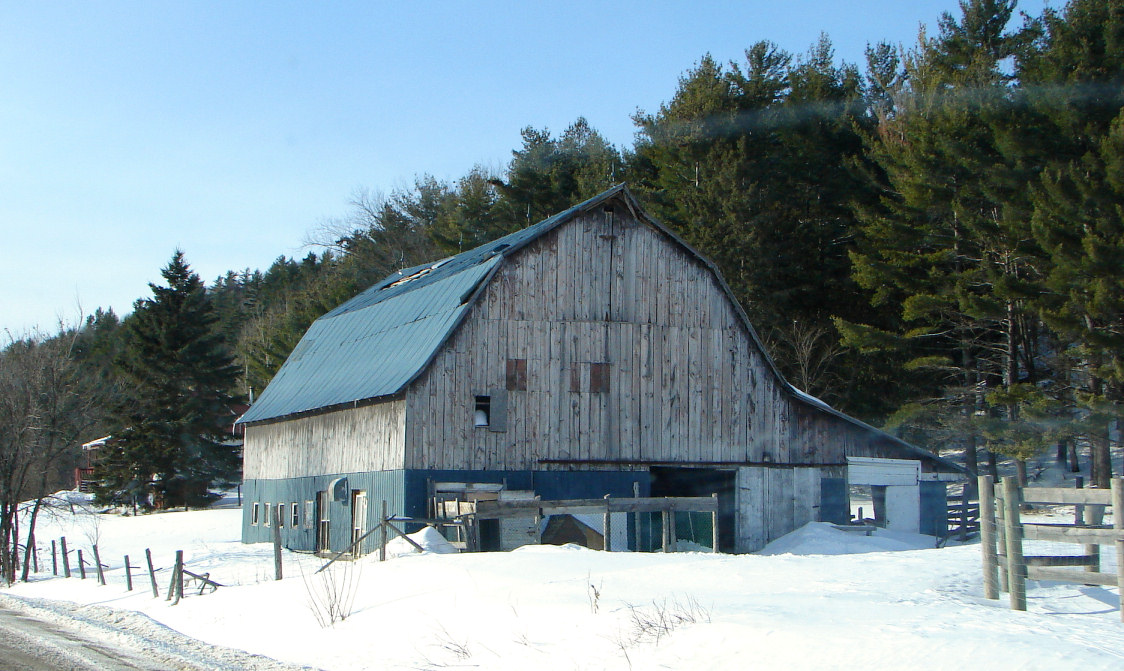
Barn in L'Ange-Gardien

== See also ==
- List of anglophone communities in Quebec
- List of municipalities in Quebec
