= Lac McArthur (Val-des-Monts) =

Lake in Quebec, Canada

- McArthur Lake
- Location in Quebec
- Location: Val-des-Monts, Les Collines-de-l'Outaouais, Quebec, Canada
- Coordinates: 45.7080555°N 75.6702778°W
- Surface elevation: 163 m (535 ft)

Lac McArthur (McArthur Lake) is a lake in the Outaouais region of Quebec, Canada, not far north of Ottawa.

== Location ==
Lac McArthur (EHEZQ) is in Val-des-Monts, Les Collines-de-l'Outaouais, Quebec, at 45.7080555°N 75.6702778°W. It is fed by the Rivière Blanche from Lac Saint-Pierre and empties into Lac Grand to the southeast. The lake is at an elevation of 163 metres (535 ft). The lake association is a member of the Federation of Lakes of Val-Des-Monts, a voluntary organization that works to protect water quality in the region. In 1990 Air Wapus Enr. was granted a license to operate a domestic air charter service from a base at Lac McArthur between 15 May and 15 October each year, however this license ended in 2001.

== Water quality ==
Water quality measurements were taken in mid-June, July and August 2015. Average total phosphorus concentration was 4.4 μg/L, so the lake is classed as oligotrophic, or poor in nutrients. The average concentration of chlorophyll in the lake was 1.50 μg/L, which indicates that the biomass of microscopic algae suspended in water is low and confirms the oligotrophic classification. The average concentration of dissolved organic carbon in the lake was relatively low at 2.98 mg/L. The lake is not shown on the list of lakes affected by cyanobacteria (blue green algae) blooms between 2004 and 2014.

== Sources ==
- Decision No. 168-A-1990, Canadian Transportation Agency
- Decision No. 168-A-2001, Canadian Transportation Agency
- Federation of Lakes, Federation of Lakes of Val-Des-Monts
- Lac McArthur (PDF) (in French), Fédération des Lacs de Val-des-Monts
- Lac McArthur, Natural Resources Canada
- Lac McArthur Topo Maps, Yellow Maps
