= Arthur Hands =

British photographer (1894–1965)

Arthur Hands (1894–1965) was a British photographer.

He was based in Wanstead, Essex (now London), and ran what had been his father's photographic studio on Wanstead High Street. The Arthur Hands Archive, c. 1890 to 1930 includes the work of his father.

He photographed Winston Churchill in the 1920s when he was Chancellor of the Exchequer.

His work is in the permanent collections of the Imperial War Museum, Victoria and Albert Museum, the Churchill Archives, and the Essex Archives.
