= Arthur Harvey (disambiguation) =

Arthur Harvey (1895–1976), was an American writer, businessman, oil pioneer, major, and a World War I and II veteran

Arthur Harvey may also refer to:

- Arthur E. Harvey (1884–1971), American architect
- Arthur George Harvey (1866–1927), New Zealand doctor
- Arthur Harvey (Australian politician) (1827–1902), politician in the colony of South Australia
- Arthur Vere Harvey, Baron Harvey of Prestbury (1906–1994), Royal Air Force officer and British Conservative politician
