= Les Collines-de-l'Outaouais Regional County Municipality =

Les Collines-de-l'Outaouais
- Regional county municipality
- Coordinates: 45°33′N 75°52′W
- Country: Canada
- Province: Quebec
- Region: Outaouais
- Effective: December 4, 1991
- County seat: Chelsea

Government
  - Type: Prefecture
  - Prefect: Marc Carriere

Area
  - Total: 2,199.30 km^{2} (849.15 sq mi)
  - Land: 1,912.05 km^{2} (738.25 sq mi)

Population (2021)
  - Total: 53,657
  - Density: 28.1/km^{2} (73/sq mi)
  - Change 2016-2021: ▲11%
  - Dwellings: 24,627
- Time zone: UTC−5 (EST)
  - Summer (DST): UTC−4 (EDT)
- Area code: 819
- Website: www.mrcdescollinesdeloutaouais.qc.ca

Les Collines-de-l'Outaouais (French pronunciation: [le kɔlin də lutawɛ], "The hills of the Outaouais") is a regional county municipality in the Outaouais region of western Quebec, Canada. The region nearly encircles the City of Gatineau, which is to the south. Its administrative seat is in Chelsea, Quebec.

It was created in January 1991 when the Communauté régionale de l'Outaouais (Outaouais Regional Community) was split into Les Collines-de-l'Outaouais RCM and the Communauté urbaine de l'Outaouais (Outaouais Urban Community, now City of Gatineau). The region is home to the majority of Gatineau Park. It is bisected by the Gatineau River which flows from north to south. The Ottawa River forms the southwestern boundary.

== Subdivisions ==
There are six subdivisions within the RCM:

Municipalities (6)

- Cantley
- Chelsea
- L'Ange-Gardien
- La Pêche
- Pontiac
- Val-des-Monts

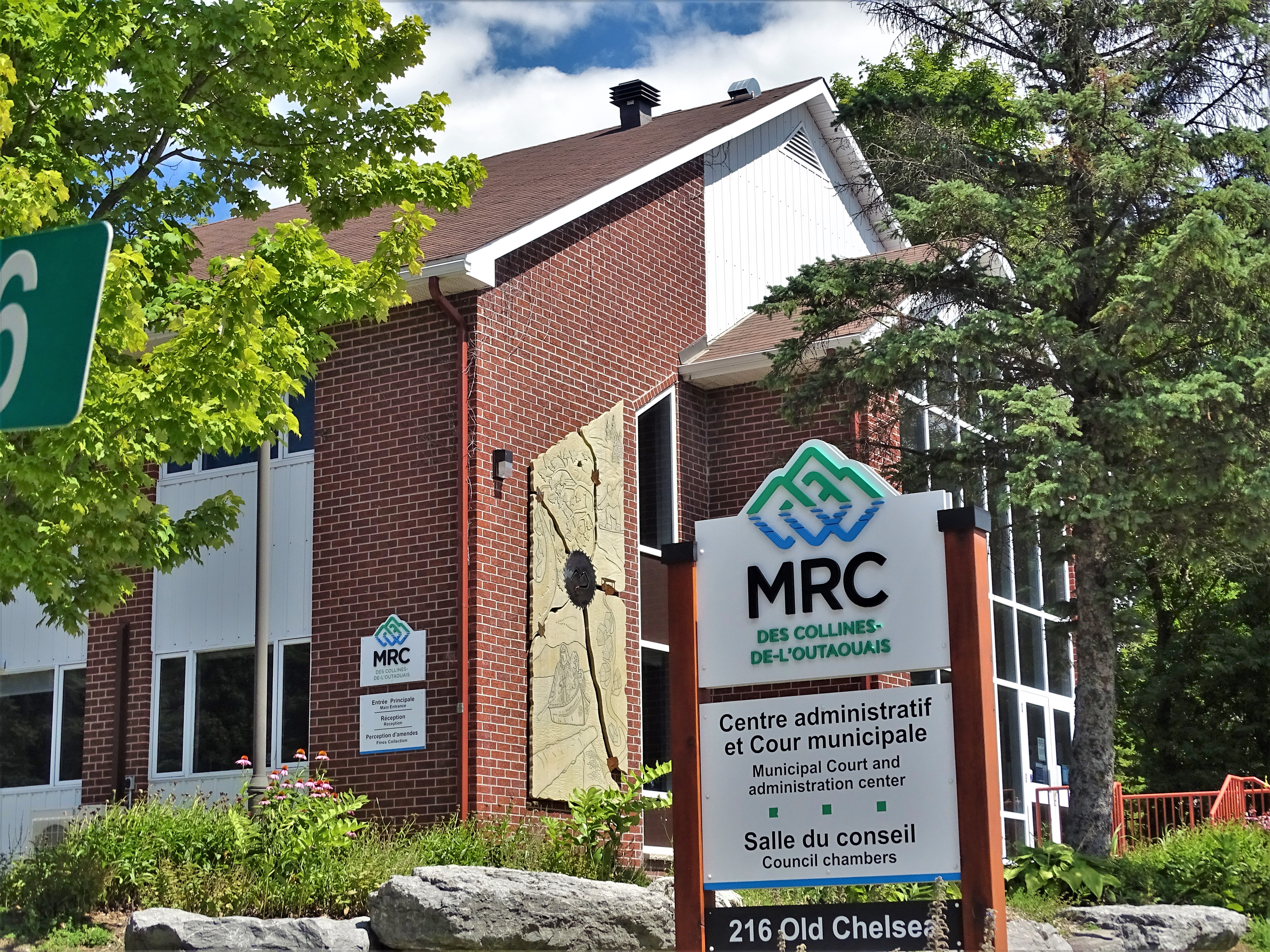
The administrative office and municipal court of the RCM is located in Old Chelsea.

== Demographics ==
Canada census – Les Collines-de-l'Outaouais community profile

	2021	2016	2011
Population	54,498 (+11.0% from 2016)	49,094 (5.8% from 2011)	46,393 (10.4% from 2006)
Land area	2,025.38 km^{2} (782.00 sq mi)	2,051.77 km^{2} (792.19 sq mi)	2,048.24 km^{2} (790.83 sq mi)
Population density	26.9/km^{2} (70/sq mi)	23.9/km^{2} (62/sq mi)	22.7/km^{2} (59/sq mi)
Median age	42.0 (M: 42.4, F: 41.6)	41.8 (M: 42.1, F: 41.5)	40.4 (M: 40.6, F: 40.1)
Private dwellings	25,105 (total) 21,103 (occupied)	23,164 (total)	22,056 (total)
Median household income	$110,000	$90,482	$85,789

References: 2021 2016 2011

Historical census populations
Year	Pop.	±%
1986	20,355	—
1991	28,894	+42.0%
1996	33,680	+16.6%
2001	35,188	+4.5%
2006	42,005	+19.4%
2011	46,393	+10.4%
2016	49,094	+5.8%
2021	54,498	+11.0%

=== Ethnicity ===
Source: 2021 Census

- 92.0% White
- 4.9% Indigenous
- 3.1% Visible Minority

== Transportation ==
=== Access routes ===
Highways and numbered routes that run through the municipality, including external routes that start or finish at the county border:

- Autoroutes
  - A-5
  - A-50
- Principal highways
  - R-148
- Secondary highways
  - R-307
  - R-309
  - R-315
  - R-366
- External routes
  - None

== See also ==
- List of regional county municipalities and equivalent territories in Quebec
