= McArthur Lake (Ontario) =

Lake in Ontario, Canada

McArthur Lake, Ontario
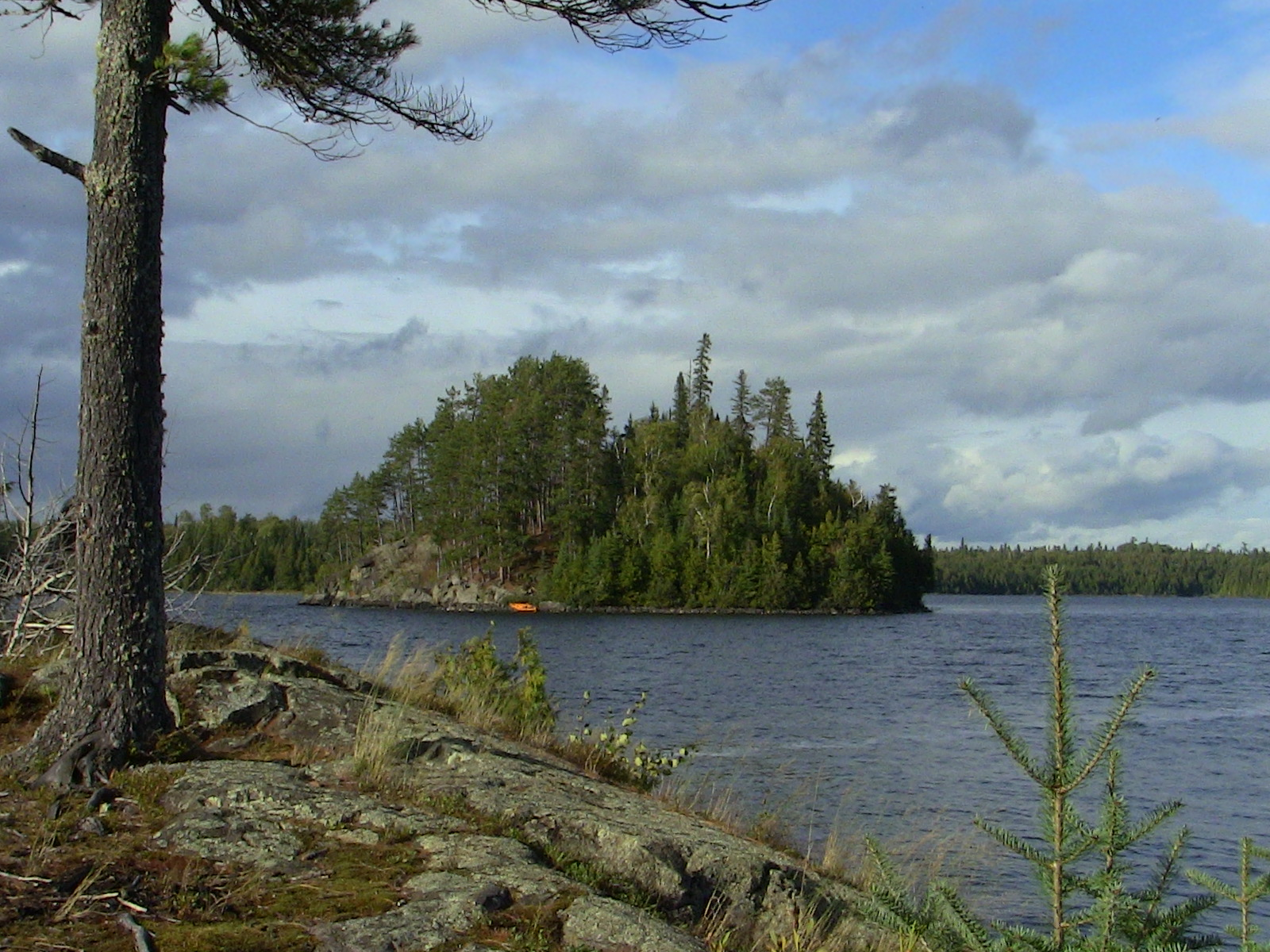
- Sharprock Island as viewed from Olyjian Isle in central McArthur Lake

- Location in Ontario
- Location: Timiskaming District, Ontario, Canada
- Coordinates: 48.2061111°N 81.2155556°W

McArthur Lake is a lake in Ontario, Canada to the south of the city of Timmins. The lake has a rocky shoreline and 13 islands. It is used for recreation in the summer, but freezes in the winter. Due to the harsh climate most of the trees around the lake are conifers. The rocks around the lake have potential for nickel extraction.

== Geography ==
McArthur Lake (FCEHV) is located in Timiskaming District, about 40 kilometres (25 mi) south of the city of Timmins. Most of the lake lies in McArthur township, but the eastern part extends into Douglas Township.

It has an elevation of 333 metres (1,093 ft) above sea level. It has an area of about 2,569,000 square metres (27,650,000 sq ft), with an average depth of 14 feet (4.3 m) and a maximum depth of 50 feet (15 m). It has a volume of 11,085,000 cubic metres (391,500,000 cu ft).

Islands in the lake include:

- McArthur Island
- Sharprock Island
- Blueberry Island
- Hidden Island
- Delta Island
- Shadfly Island
- Olyjian Isle
- Diorite Island
- Midway Island
- Crayfish Island
- Cat Island
- Maziic Island
- Outset Island

Some of the bays in the lake include:

- Leech Bay
- East Bay
- Theriault Bay
- False Bay
- Interior Bay

== Climate ==
The lake is in the Hemiboreal climate zone. Annual average temperature is 1 °C (34 °F). The warmest month is July, when the average temperature is 16 °C (61 °F), and the coldest is January, with an average temperature of −18 °C (0 °F). Annual average rainfall is 904 millimetres (35.6 in). The wettest month is August, with an average of 128 millimetres (5.0 in) and the driest in February, with 11 millimetres (0.43 in).

== Environment ==
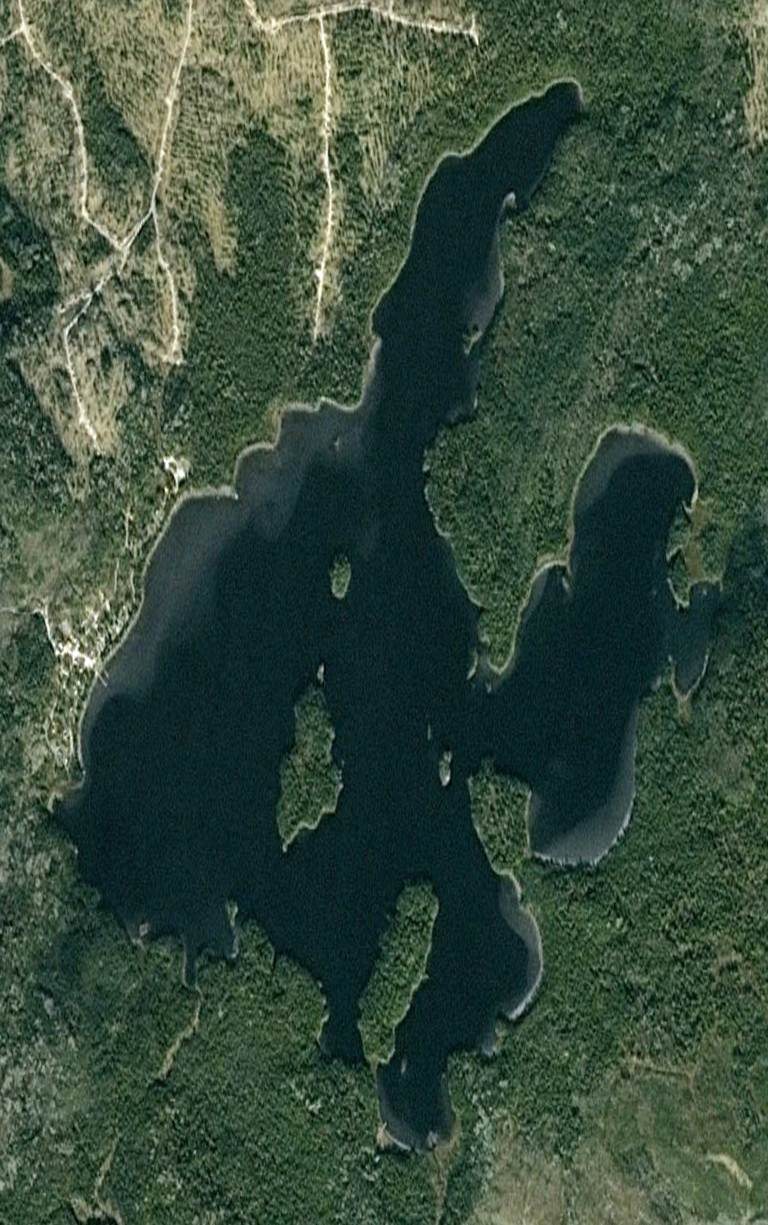
Satellite view

McArthur Lake has a rocky shoreline with three main bays and thirteen islands. The west side of the lake has more than 20 camps and cottages. It is used for kayaking, boating and fishing for walleye and northern pike. The lake is frozen over during the winter. In July surface water temperatures may reach 25 °C (77 °F). Trees include cedars and poplars, balsam firs and pines of various types, but few deciduous trees.

Total phosphorus concentration was measured at two sites in the lake in 2004–2007. Average levels were:

Date	West end, deep spot μg/L	Mid-lake μg/L
31 May 2004	6.69	6.52
16 May 2005	6.09	5.41
17 May 2007	7.28	6.63

Since these all levels are below 10 μg/L the lake is considered oligotrophic and unlikely to experience nuisance algal blooms.

== Geology ==
The lake lies in a zone of ultramafic metavolcanic rocks (Komatiites) known as the Tisdale Assemblage. The southwest corner crosses a northwesterly trending quartz-bearing diorite sill of intermediate intrusive rocks. The southern part of the lake is crossed by two diabase dikes of the Sudbury dike swarm. The dykes have 12% plagioclase, 20% tremolite, 35% clinopyroxene, 8% chlorite, 18% sericite, 3% magnetite and 2% calcium-garnet. Outcrops of high magnesium ultramafic rocks of the Goose Lake Formation are found south and northwest of the lake.

In the south of the lake, gold is reported to be found, although exploration work has consisted almost entirely of trenching. The lake is mostly contained within the McArthur Lake Nickel Property owned by Eloro Resources Ltd.. Eloro acquired this property, which covers about 30 square kilometres (12 sq mi), in 2007 via claim staking after an airborne geophysical survey showed magnetic continuity with the Texmont nickel-bearing lithologies to the south.

== See also ==
- List of lakes in Ontario

== Sources ==
- "Dataset Index", NEO: NASA Earth Observations, NASA, archived from the original on 2021-10-26
- Breaks, F.W. (1978), Geology of the Horwood Lake Area, Ontario Ministry of Natural Resources
- Houlé, M.G. (2007), Precambrian geology of McArthur Township; Ontario (PDF) (Preliminary Map P.3583, scale 1:20 000), Geological Survey
- McArthur Lake, Natural Resources Canada
- "McArthur Lake", Mapio
- McArthur Lake Nickel Property, Eloro Resources Ltd.
- McArthur Lake (Stn 3064, Site Id 2), Ontario Ministry of the Environment and Climate Change, 25 January 2016
- McArthur Lake (Stn 3064, Site Id 2), Ontario Ministry of the Environment and Climate Change, 25 January 2016
- Peel, M. C.; Finlayson, B. L.; McMahon, T. A. (11 October 2007), "Updated world map of the Köppen-Geiger climate classification", Hydrol. Earth Syst. Sci., 11 (5): 1633–1644, doi:10.5194/hess-11-1633-2007
- "McArthur Lake Topo Maps", Yellow Maps
- "Rainfall (1 Month - TRMM)", NEO: NASA Earth Observations, NASA, archived from the original on 2019-04-19
- Tabatabai, Mehran (1978-06-15), "Petrography and geochemistry of the McArthur Township area, Ontario", M.Sc. Earth Sciences
