= Lac Grand (Quebec) =

Lake in Val-des-Monts, Quebec, Canada

- Location within Quebec
- Location: Val-des-Monts, Quebec
- Coordinates: 45.681°N 75.653°W
- Lake type: Glacial
- Primary outflows: Narrows into Lac Dam
- Basin countries: Canada
- Surface area: 3.77 km^{2} (1.46 sq mi)
- Max. depth: 40 m (130 ft)
- Surface elevation: 160 m (520 ft)
- Frozen: only frozen in winter
- Islands: Ile-des-Peres
- Settlements: Val-des-Monts

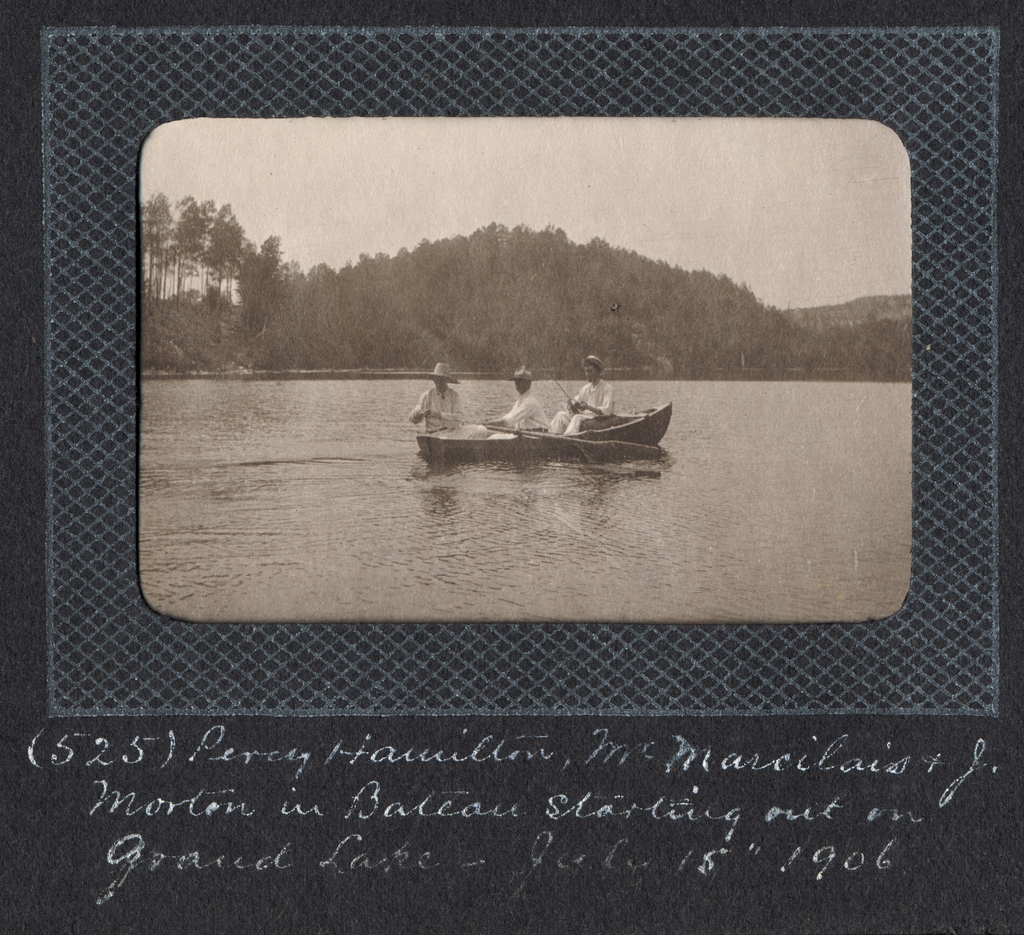
Percy Hamilton, Mr Marcilais & J. Morton boating on Lac Grand, July 15, 1906

Lake Grand (Lac Grand) is a private lake in the Outaouais region of Quebec, Canada. It covers an area of about 377 hectares and lies at an elevation of 160 m (520 ft) above sea level. There are no settlements on the lake, although it has many cottages on its shore. Despite having many cottages, some permanent residents live on the lake. Watersports such as waterskiing and sailing are popular among residents of the lake although the lake is mostly shallow. Other popular recreation includes fishing and swimming and paddle-boarding.

The lake community recently published a book for lake residents entitled "The Grand Experience", covering the history and geography of the lake.

== Geography ==
The lake consists of four main bays, two in the south, two in the north. The main section of the lake is where it reaches its deepest depths, going as deep as 40 metres below the surface, which is slightly deeper than significantly larger Lake Winnipeg. There are many islands in Lac Grand, the largest being Ile-Des-Peres in Priest's Bay.

Lac Grand has two inflows, including a stream and waterfall from Lac McArthur and a narrow section of water from Lac Vert. Lac Grand's only outflow is into Lac Dam (sometimes spelled Lac Dame), which flows into Lac Brassard and finally Lac McGregor.

There are several minerals to be found in the area, the most prominent being mica, both blue and black in colour, but green, caramel and black serpentine as well as olivine can be found as well.

== History ==
The lake used to be the location of a mica mine.
