= Artūras Skučas =

Artūras Antanas Skučas (born March 7, 1961) is a writer and military man of Lithuania. He was trained as an architect and is employed as an officer in the Lithuanian army.

He was the editor of Sąjūdžio Žinios, the first non-governmental periodical publication in what was then still Soviet-occupied Lithuania. He was one of the founders of the Savanoriai (the volunteer military). He created, and was the director of, the Apsaugos Skyrius, the first non-Soviet controlled and entirely new intelligence and protective force within the then de facto boundaries of the Soviet Union.

He has published two books of poetry. The latest, Einu/The Roadling (2006), is Lithuanian with an English translation. In 2006 Skučas had his first exhibition of photographs and his second in 2007.

He is married to Eglė (Martinaitytė) Skučienė and is the father of four children.
