= RADARSAT =

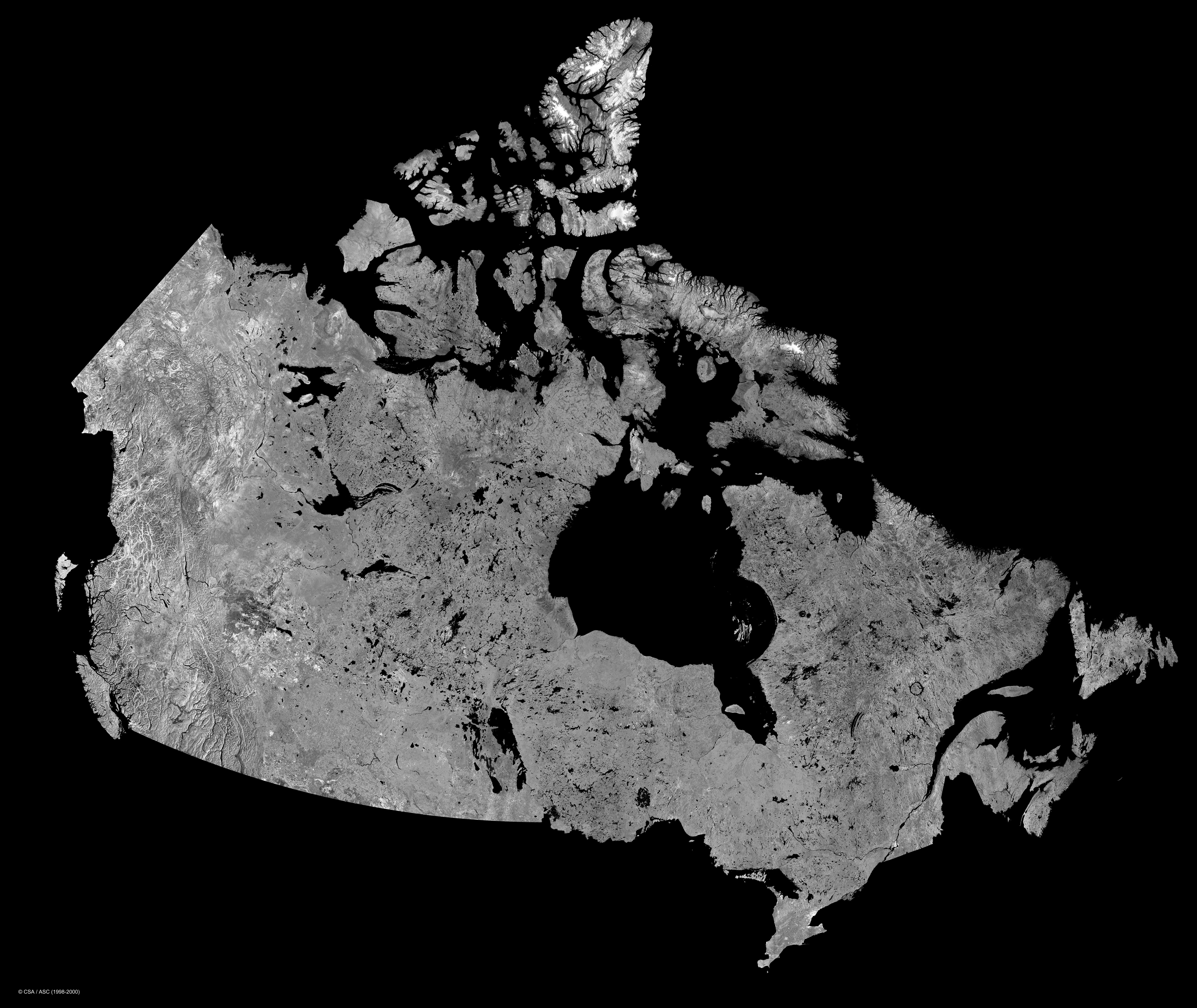
RADARSAT 1000m resolution map of Canada

RADARSAT is a Canadian remote sensing Earth observation satellite program overseen by the Canadian Space Agency (CSA). The program has consisted of:

- RADARSAT-1 (1995–2013)
- RADARSAT-2 (2007–)
- RADARSAT Constellation (2019-)

== Overview ==
=== RADARSAT-1 ===
The RADARSAT-1 project consisted of collaboration between the Canadian federal government and provinces, the United States, and the private sector. RADARSAT-1 was launched by NASA on November 4, 1995, although it was owned and controlled by the Canadian Space Agency. The project had a projected lifetime of 5 years, but operated for 18 years before failing in 2013. The goal of this project was to produce a satellite for earth observation by way of a Synthetic Aperture Radar, which is an advanced radar sensor and powerful microwave instrument capable of producing high quality images of the Earth during day or night and across a wide range of weather conditions including cloud cover, smoke, and haze. As a result of the versatility of RADARSAT-1, it has proven highly beneficial to both commercial and scientific users.

=== RADARSAT-2 ===
RADARSAT-2 was constructed with several improvements over the RADARSAT-1 project, making it one of the most advanced radar imaging satellites in the world. Some of the improvements over RADARSAT-1 include increased spatial resolution, multiple polarization filters, solid state recorders, and GPS receivers on board.

=== RADARSAT Constellation ===
RADARSAT Constellation was constructed in order to make improvements on the previous model (RADARSAT-2). This rendition will use a constellation of three small satellites to provide greater coverage while minimizing service interruptions. This system allows for one of the three satellites to pass over an exact location every 4 days in comparison to the 24 day time frame of its predecessors. RADARSAT Constellation has an orbit around Earth at 600 km making a full pass every 96 minutes with each of the three satellites separated by a span of 32 minutes. The mission aims to aide with disaster management as well as monitor ecosystems.

== RADARSAT International ==
RADARSAT International (RSI) was formed in 1989 to market, process, and distribute data from RADARSAT-1. It was owned by a consortium of aerospace companies consisting of MDA, Spar Aerospace, COM DEV International, and Lockheed Martin.

RSI provided Earth-observation data and derived information products from RADARSAT-1 along with data from other commercially available Earth-observation satellites including Landsat 4, Landsat 5, Landsat 7, IKONOS, IRS, ERS, QuickBird, and ENVISAT.

In 1999, MDA completed a buyout of the other RSI shareholders and incorporated the company as MDA Geospatial Services Inc. (MDA GSI), a wholly owned subsidiary.

MDA GSI holds the operating license for RADARSAT-2 under contract from the Canadian Space Agency.

== Main users of RADARSAT data ==
The Canadian Ice Service (CIS) is one of the largest processors of the RADARSAT data. Once the CIS has processed the data at the Canadian Center for Data Processing (CCTD) in Gatineau, Quebec, it is then provided to clients such as the Canadian Coast Guard (CCG). Since RADARSAT data is readily available in near-real time, it is one of the best source of information to use for coastal monitoring, ship detection and maritime ice navigation.

== See also ==
- RADARSAT Constellation
- Polar Epsilon
