= Gatineau Satellite Station =

Canadian satellite station located in Cantley, Québec

The Gatineau Satellite Station is a Canadian satellite station located in Cantley near Gatineau, in the province of Québec. Like the Prince Albert Radar Laboratory, it was originally a military Radar station, operated by the Canadian Defence Research Telecommunications Establishment (DRTE), a division of the Canadian Defense Research Board. With the two satellites / radar stations, it is possible to monitor the whole airspace over Canada, as well as parts from the USA and Alaska.

== Tasks and equipment ==
The plant, which is still operated today, is primarily used as an earth station. It has a large factory building and a 13-meter-diameter satellite antenna, replacing two old 10-meter-diameter antennas in June 2014.

Used as earth station for the following satellites:

- Formerly:
  - ERS-2
  - Envisat
  - RADARSAT-1
- Current:
  - Landsat 7
  - RADARSAT-2
  - RADARSAT Constellation
