= Cantley, Quebec =

Cantley
- Municipality
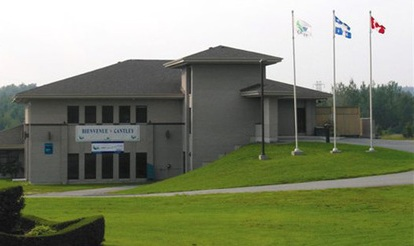
- Cantley Town Hall

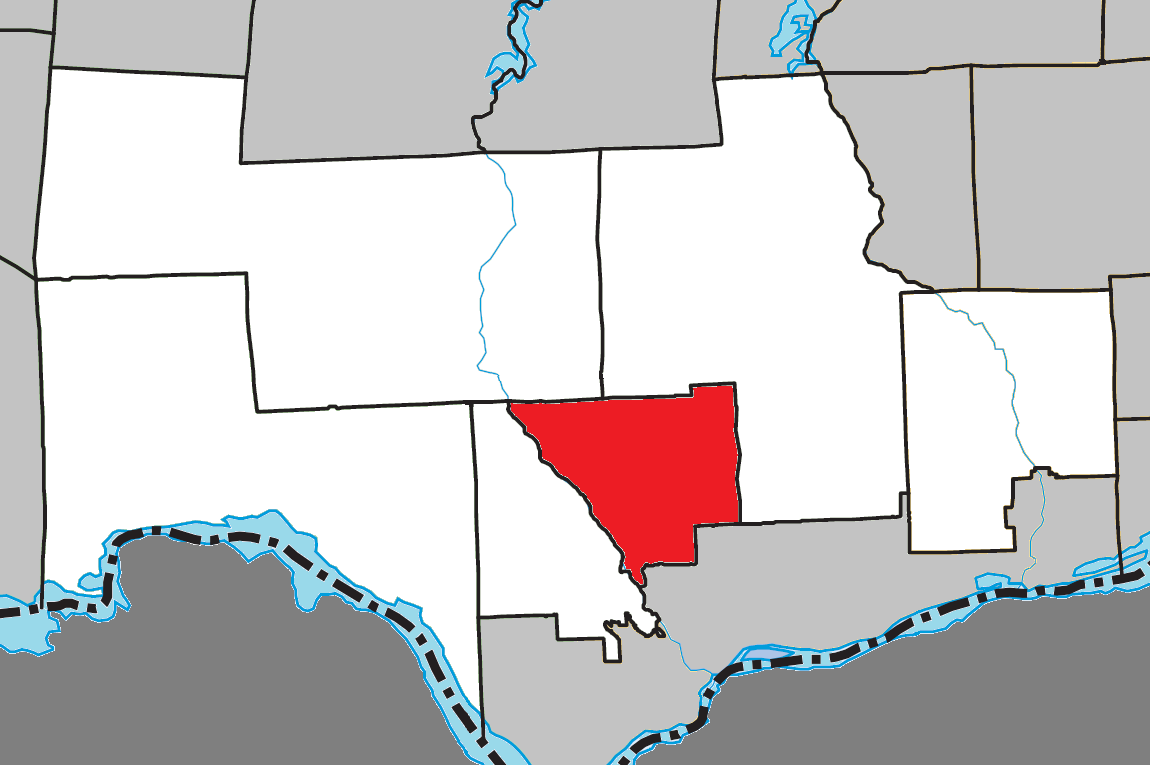
- Location within Les Collines-de-l'Outaouais RCM

- Location in western Quebec
- Coordinates: 45°34′N 75°47′W
- Country: Canada
- Province: Quebec
- Region: Outaouais
- RCM: Les Collines-de-l'Outaouais
- Constituted: January 1, 1989

Government
  - Mayor: Nathalie Bélisle
  - Federal riding: Pontiac
  - Prov. riding: Gatineau

Area
  - Total: 133.85 km^{2} (51.68 sq mi)
  - Land: 126.24 km^{2} (48.74 sq mi)

Population (2021)
  - Total: 11,449
  - Density: 90.8/km^{2} (235/sq mi)
- Time zone: UTC−05:00 (EST)
  - Summer (DST): UTC−04:00 (EDT)
- Postal code(s): J8V 2Z9
- Area code: 819
- Highways: R-307
- Website: www.cantley.ca

Cantley is a rural municipality in Quebec, Canada, north of the city of Gatineau, east of the Gatineau River, located within Canada's National Capital Region approximately 17 km (11 mi) from Parliament Hill. Cantley is one of six municipalities within the Collines-de-l'Outaouais Regional County Municipality. Its roots are in farmland and mining, but recent housing projects since its creation in 1989 have resulted in a high rate of population growth. The population at the 2021 Canadian Census was 11,449, an increase of 7.0% from the 2016 population of 10,699. French is the first language of 86.7% of Cantley's residents.

== History ==
The town of Cantley was founded in the early 1830s by Colonel Cantley, a subordinate of Colonel John By during the period that included the birth of the city of Bytown (now Ottawa). During this time, Colonel Cantley went north and set foot in land several kilometres from Bytown where he remained until his death. Andrew Blackburn and his 2 sons arrived in 1829. Others were to follow, but a large contingent of Irish Catholics in the 1840s was to give the area its distinctly Irish, or Hibernian, character. In the 1850s, the area started to develop with the construction of its post office in honour of Cantley and a mass arrival of Irish descendants. Education started to play a role in the same period when a Roman Catholic chapel and school were built as a result of the increasing number of residents in the area. Another school was built on a farmer's land in 1858. Farming, logging and lumber milling were early industries. Later developments, especially mica and phosphate mines after 1885 and the influx of cottagers and city dwellers to the sprawling suburbia, were to change the demographic characteristics of the area. French Canadians are now the dominant ethnic group.

In 1925, two hydroelectric dams were constructed along the Gatineau River, making them the biggest economic and industrial project of the town's history. These are now known today as the Chelsea and Rapides-Farmers Hydroelectric Stations (Centrale Chelsea and Centrale Rapides-Farmers). The latter station is now within the city of Gatineau limits.

The Mont Cascades resort opened in 1976 and represents a major part of the town's recreational and touristic assets.

Previously, Cantley was a rural village within Touraine, previously Hull-Est, until the merger that created the original city of Gatineau in 1975. This move proved highly unpopular with Cantley's rural residents who worked to petition the provincial government to recreate an independent municipality. In 1989, Cantley became an independent rural community.

Cantley is also home to the Gatineau Satellite Station owned by Natural Resources Canada, providing ground reception facilities for satellites such as Radarsat-2 and Radarsat Constellation.

== Demographics ==
Canada census – Cantley community profile

| | 2021 | 2016 | 2011 |
| Population | 11,449 (+7.0% from 2016) | 10,699 (8.2% from 2011) | 9,888 (24.8% from 2006) |
| Land area | 126.12 km^{2} (48.70 sq mi) | 128.36 km^{2} (49.56 sq mi) | 129.96 km^{2} (50.18 sq mi) |
| Population density | 90.8/km^{2} (235/sq mi) | 83.4/km^{2} (216/sq mi) | 76.1/km^{2} (197/sq mi) |
| Median age | 40.0 (M: 40.0, F: 39.6) | 38.1 (M: 38.7, F: 37.5) | 36.3 (M: 36.7, F: 36.0) |
| Private dwellings | 4,289 (total) 4,109 (occupied) | 3,988 (total) | 3,580 (total) |
| Median household income | $131,000 | $110,327 | $96,835 |

References: 2021 2016 2011

Historical census populations – Cantley, Quebec
| Year | Pop. | ±% |
|---|---|---|
| 1986 | 3,536 | — |
| 1991 | 4,424 | +25.1% |
| 1996 | 5,443 | +23.0% |
| 2001 | 5,898 | +8.4% |
| 2006 | 7,926 | +34.4% |
| 2011 | 9,888 | +24.8% |
| 2016 | 10,699 | +8.2% |
| 2021 | 11,449 | +7.0% |

Mother tongue:

- English as first language: 10.6%
- French as first language: 84.5%
- English and French as first language: 1.6%
- Other as first language: 2.9%

== Government ==
Cantley is governed by a seven member council consisting of six councillors, each representing a district, and the mayor. The districts and current councillors are as follows:

| District | District Name | Councillor |
|---|---|---|
| Mayor | Cantley | Nathalie Bélisle |
| 1 | District des Monts | Meaghan Massey |
| 2 | District des Prés | Frédérique Laurin |
| 3 | District de la Rive | Alexandre Khan |
| 4 | District du Parc | Jean-Baptiste Michon |
| 5 | District des Érables | Matthieu Hack |
| 6 | District des Lacs | Isabelle St-Louis |

== Transportation ==
Cantley's main artery is Route 307 also known as Montée de la Source (formerly known as la rue Principale) which is the extension of Rue Saint-Louis in Gatineau. Major collector roads include Chemin du Mont-Cascades, Chemin Ste-Élisabeth, Montée des Érables and Montée St-Amour. Most of the roads in the town connect to Route 307 and most of them are dead-ends. There are very few that connect to secondary roads.

Since June 15, 2015, Transcollines has provided public transportation services in Cantley, replacing the previous Société de transport de l'Outaouais (STO) routes. As of May 2023, Route 931 provides weekday peak period service between Cantley and the De La Gappe Rapibus station with connections to Ottawa and the Hull and Gatineau sectors of Gatineau. Route 932 provides weekday peak period service between Cantley and the Cégep de l'Outaouais' Gabrielle-Roy campus via the STO Galéries de Hull Rapibus station. The Transcollines On Demand service is available at other times, including evenings, weekends and statutory holidays. Park and Ride lots are available on rue Hogan (at Montée de la Source), at the Town Hall (rue River), on rue Mont-Joel (at rue Marsolais) and on rue Denis (at Parc Denis).

== Recreation ==
Chemin du Mont-Cascades gives access to the Mont Cascades Ski Resort and Waterpark, as well as the Mont Cascades Golf Club. The waterpark is the largest in the Outaouais region while the Ski Resort offers 20 ski trails. The main chalet of the resort burned down on August 1, 2021, with no casualties reported. Cantley is also home to Nakkertok, the largest cross-country ski club in the National Capital Region. Cantley is centrally located with easy access to many recreational activities within the National Capital Region. These include the Gatineau Park, ski resorts such as Sommet Edelweiss (Edelweiss Valley) and Vorlage in La Pêche (Wakefield), Camp Fortune in Chelsea and Mont Ste-Marie in Lac Ste-Marie. Cantley has also a number of parks located across its territory.

== Education ==
The Commission Scolaire des Draveurs has three French-language primary schools in Cantley: École Sainte-Élisabeth, École de la Rose-des-Vents, and École de l'Orée-des-Bois. The latter being beside each other.

English language education is provided by the Western Québec School Board. Students attend school in neighbouring communities, such as Chelsea or Gatineau, since there are no English-language schools in Cantley.

== Cantley dry materials dump issue ==
From 2005 to 2007 controversy arose concerning a dry materials dump located in the northern end of the town. Nearby residents complained about toxic pollutants generated by the dump that caused effects on their health. Many residents and mayor Steve Harris firmly requested the closure of the dump. In late 2005, a fire broke out underneath the material for several weeks and caused an evacuation of the nearby residents. The fire was initially thought to be caused by combustible fuel, but according to the owners of the dump, a criminal act may have been involved.

Several lawsuits were planned by residents against the owner and on July 11, 2006, the town went to court against the dump for a compensation of over $55,000 for the fire and cover costs for the evacuation process and firefighters salary. Tensions rose once more when the owner, Gilles Proulx, launched a $750,000 lawsuit against a local couple. Proulx claimed that the couple had made comments against his reputation.

The Quebec Ministry of Environment forced the owners to adopt measures to reduce the amount of toxic pollutants and gave them several delays to comply. About a year later, it received a second warning and was given another 10-day notice to meet the Ministry's standards or it would be forced to shut down its operations.

On September 21, 2006, the Minister Claude Béchard ordered its closure but as the owners challenged the decision to court, it was re-opened occasionally. The site is currently not in operation as the case is still under study by a provincial court, but the Tribunal administratif du Québec said in October 2007 that they supported the Minister's decision. An appeal to that decision did not lead to changes, and the landfill operator further appealed to the Quebec Superior Court, to no avail.

Due to its closure, it created a significant waste problem across the region as only one landfill site remains in operation in Val-des-Monts. Many businesses are forced to travel longer for waste disposals while costs skyrocketed. On occasion, various materials were dumped in many fields and lands.

== Twin city ==
- Ornans, France

== See also ==
- List of anglophone communities in Quebec
- List of municipalities in Quebec
