= Joseph-Barthélemi Merleau =

Canadian politician

Joseph-Barthélemi Merleau (January 18, 1891 – February 13, 1954) was a Canadian lumber merchant and politician in Quebec. He represented Gatineau in the Legislative Assembly of Quebec from 1935 to 1936.

The son of Léon-Herménégilde Merleau, a merchant, and Helen Skeehan, he was born in Lac-Sainte-Marie and was educated at the College of the Clerics of Saint Viator in Outremont. Merleau served as mayor of Gracefield from 1933 to 1937.

He was elected to the Quebec assembly in 1935, then was defeated by Georges-Adélard Auger when he ran for reelection in 1936.

From 1938 to 1942, Merleau worked in expropriation in the Eastern Townships. From 1942 to 1952, he was assistant controller for the Quebec Department of Revenue.

He was married twice: first to Veronica Stella Grace in 1912 and then to Janet Mildred Amy Laylor Gosselin in 1943.

He died in Kazabazua at the age of 63.
