= David Florida Laboratory =

Canadian Space Agency's spacecraft assembly center

Coordinates: 45.347094°N 75.886250°W

The David Florida Laboratory is the Canadian Space Agency's spacecraft assembly, integration and testing centre, in Shirleys Bay, just west of central Ottawa. It is operated by the Canadian Space Agency and rented out to Canadian and foreign aerospace and telecommunications companies and organizations for qualifying space bound equipment such as communication or scientific satellites, or components made to be placed on satellites or installed in a space station. The laboratory was named to honour C. David Florida, a leading Canadian pioneer in space research.

Officially opened in September 1972, the lab has been expanded over the years to accommodate the demand for its services. There are many support facilities such as storage areas, clean rooms, electrodynamic shakers, anechoic chambers, space (thermal and vacuum) simulation chambers and in-house mechanical, electrical and electronic shops.

In the past the David Florida Laboratory has tested satellites for Brazil, Indonesia, and the European Space Agency. Inmarsat has designated it as their authorized antenna test house. It has also tested Canadian satellites such as RADARSAT-1 and previously tested the Special Purpose Dexterous Manipulator (Dextre) which now forms part of the Mobile Servicing System of the International Space Station. It completed work on the Orbiter Boom Sensor System which first flew on Shuttle Discovery during STS-114. The Laboratory worked on RADARSAT-2 prior to launch in 2007.

Recently the David Florida Laboratory has completed the integration and environmental testing of the Maritime Monitoring and Messaging Microsatellite (M3MSat). This is a technology demonstration satellite that will be used to assess the utility of having in space an Automatic Identification System (AIS) for reading signals from vessels to better manage transport in Canadian waters. M3MSat was scheduled to be launched in 2015.

In March 2024, the government announced that the laboratory would close by March 31, 2025. On June 27, 2025, MDA Space announced that it would take over operation of the laboratory under a temporary occupancy licence.
