= Joseph-Célestin Nadon =

Canadian politician

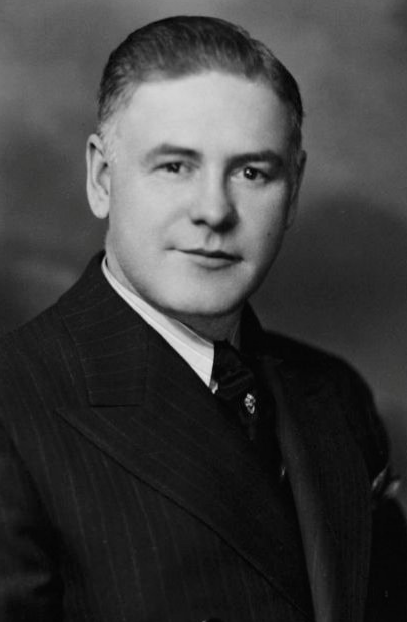

Member of the Canadian Parliament for Gatineau
- In office 1949–1953
- Preceded by: Léon-Joseph Raymond
- Succeeded by: Rodolphe Leduc

Member of the Legislative Assembly of Quebec for Gatineau
- In office 1939–1948
- Preceded by: Georges-Adélard Auger
- Succeeded by: Gérard Desjardins

Personal details
- Born: 11 January 1899 Sainte-Famille-d'Aumond, Quebec
- Died: 17 December 1953 (aged 54) Maniwaki, Quebec
- Party: Liberal
- Other political affiliations: Quebec Liberal Party
- Spouse: Lucienne Roy
- Relations: Alphonse Fournier, cousin

Joseph-Célestin Nadon (11 January 1899 – 17 December 1953) was a Canadian provincial and federal politician.

He entered politics as a municipal councillor in Maniwaki from 1928 to 1934 and was mayor from 1935 to 1939. In 1939, he was elected to the Legislative Assembly of Quebec for the riding of Gatineau. A Liberal, he was re-elected in 1944 and was defeated in 1948. In a 1949 by-election, he was elected to the House of Commons of Canada for the riding of Gatineau. A Liberal, he was re-elected in 1953 and died shortly after in December.
