= Réjean Lafrenière =

Canadian politician (1935–2016)

Réjean Lafrenière MNA

Member of the National Assembly of Quebec for Gatineau
- In office September 25, 1989 – March 26, 2007
- Preceded by: Michel Gratton
- Succeeded by: Stéphanie Vallée

Personal details
- Born: August 31, 1935
- Died: April 30, 2016 (aged 80)
- Party: Quebec Liberal Party

Réjean Lafrenière (31 August 1935 – 30 April 2016) was a Canadian politician who was a member of the National Assembly of Quebec for the Liberal Party of Quebec from 1989 to 2007. Prior to that, he was mayor of Lac-Sainte-Marie, Quebec from 1967 to 1989.

First elected in the 1989 election, he was re-elected in 1994, 1998, 2003. He did not run for re-election in 2007.
