= Denholm, Quebec =

Denholm
- Municipality
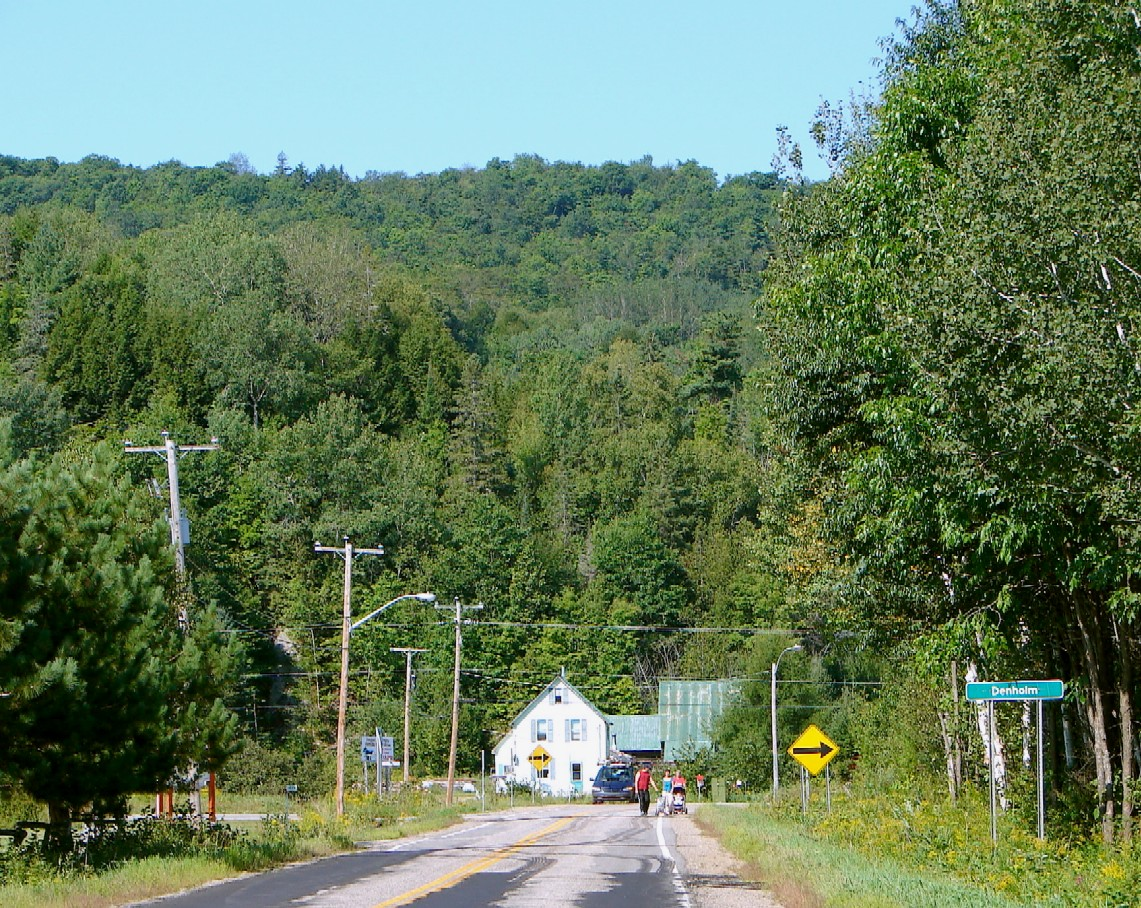

- Location in western Quebec
- Coordinates: 45°49′N 75°45′W
- Country: Canada
- Province: Quebec
- Region: Outaouais
- RCM: La Vallée-de-la-Gatineau
- Constituted: February 27, 1924

Government
  - Mayor: Denis Marcoux
  - Federal riding: Pontiac—Kitigan Zibi
  - Prov. riding: Gatineau

Area
  - Total: 199.50 km^{2} (77.03 sq mi)
  - Land: 181.14 km^{2} (69.94 sq mi)

Population (2021)
  - Total: 546
  - Density: 3.1/km^{2} (8.0/sq mi)
  - Pop (2016–21): ▲8.1%
  - Dwellings: 561
- Time zone: UTC−5 (EST)
  - Summer (DST): UTC−4 (EDT)
- Postal code(s): J8N 9C8
- Area code: 819
- Website: denholm.ca

Denholm is a municipality in La Vallée-de-la-Gatineau Regional County Municipality, Quebec, Canada, 40 kilometres (25 mi) north of Gatineau. Its territory is along the eastern shores of Lake Sainte Marie, part of the Gatineau River.

Denholm is a popular location for cottage vacationing and noted for its outdoor sport and recreation opportunities, such as fishing and hunting. There are several businesses and summer camps catering to these activities.

== Geography ==
Denholm's territory is characterized as a harmonious alternation between gently rolling hills (part of the Gatineau Hills) and numerous glacial lakes, such as Cardinal, Normandeau, Plomb, Priest, Rond, and Sam Lakes. Its highest point is located in the western portion near the Gatineau River, reaching 472 meters (1,549 ft).

Lac McArthur is in Denholm at 45.8447222°N 75.8586111°W, at an elevation of 333 metres (1,093 ft). It is near to the Réserve écologique André-Michaux. Lac McArthur is downstream from Lac du Chevreuil to the east, and drains into Lac Holme to the north. The Lac du Plomb road runs along its east shore.

== History ==
Permanent settlement of the area began between 1851 and 1861. The boundaries of this township were shown on a map of 1863 by Étienne-Eugène Taché. The Denholm Township was proclaimed in 1869, taking its name from a Scottish village located north-east of Hawick in Roxburghshire.

The Township Municipality of Denholm was formed in 1924 and its post office was established in 1951.

During the second decade of the 20th century, Denholm's development was boosted due to the presence of asbestos, serpentine, and calcite mines. Although mining activity no longer exists today, the largest sheet of mica ever mined in the world came from one of these mines.

On October 11, 2003, the Township Municipality of Denholm changed its statutes and became the Municipality of Denholm.

On May 23, 2010, the City Hall was destroyed by fire. Most records were salvaged and the municipal offices were temporarily moved next door to the Volunteer Fire Hall. The municipal employees proposed that they remain in the Fire Hall despite the cramped conditions in order to save money until the new City Hall is rebuilt and use the savings to renovate the Volunteer Fire Hall which had been neglected over the years.

In 2012 the administration part of City Hall was constructed and functional in 2013.

By spring 2016, the replacement Community Hall had been constructed at 419 Chemin du Poisson Blanc, coordinates 45.816667 deg North, -75.75 deg West. There is a large parking lot convenient to the doors, and it is often used as a rally point for visitors and tourists before heading north on Chemin de Poisson Blanc.

== Demographics ==
Historical census populations – Denholm, Quebec

Year	Pop.	±%
1976	180	—
1981	280	+55.6%
1986	368	+31.4%
1991	409	+11.1%
1996	493	+20.5%

Year	Pop.	±%
2001	526	+6.7%
2006	604	+14.8%
2011	572	−5.3%
2016	505	−11.7%
2021	546	+8.1%

Source: Statistics Canada

Private dwellings occupied by usual residents (2021): 274 (out of 561 total)

Languages:

- French as first language: 67.3%
- English as first language: 29.7%
- French and English as first language: 2%

== Politics ==
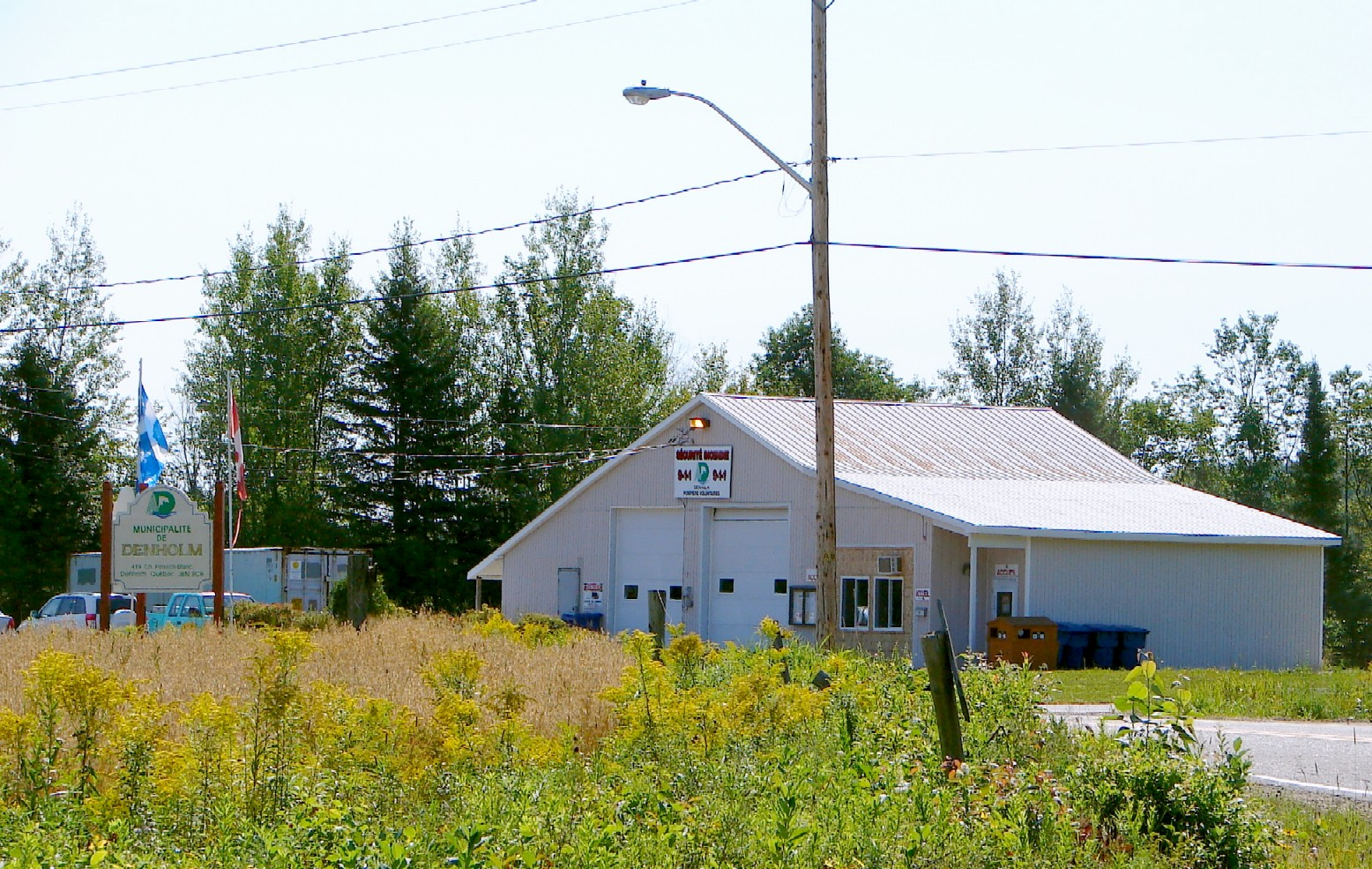
Temporary Municipal offices in Fire Hall

Denholm is part of the Pontiac federal electoral district and represented by Will Amos, Liberal Party of Canada.

Provincially, it is part of Gatineau electoral district and represented by Robert Bussière, member of the Coalition Avenir Québec.

List of former mayors:

- Gerald McMilland(1957-1979)
- Luc Thériault (1979-1998)
- Pierre Nelson Renaud (1998-2003)
- Colette Boisvert-Canavan (2003–2005)
- Gary Armstrong (2005–2009)
- Pierre Nelson Renaud (2009–2013)
- Gaétan Guindon (2013–2024)
- Pierre Nelson Renaud (2024- present)

== See also ==
- List of anglophone communities in Quebec
