= Ridha Touzi =

Electrical engineer

Ridha Touzi is an electrical engineer at the Canada Centre for Remote Sensing in Ottawa, Ontario. He was named a Fellow of the Institute of Electrical and Electronics Engineers (IEEE) in 2015 for his contributions to the design and calibration of polarimetric synthetic aperture radar.
