= Canada Centre for Mapping and Earth Observation =

Branch of Natural Resources Canada's Earth Science Sector

The Canada Centre for Mapping and Earth Observation (CCMEO), formerly Canada Centre for Remote Sensing (CCRS), is a branch of Natural Resources Canada's Earth Science Sector. It was created in 1970 with Lawrence Morley as the first Director General. The department also works closely with the private sector, especially with the development of GIS software.

== Responsibilities ==
The responsibilities of the CCRS are to provide remotely sensed geographical information to decision makers, related industries and the general public. The Centre constructs remote sensing technology and applications. It is also working closely with other departments for the Canadian Geospatial Data Infrastructure, which helps distribute acquired information.

The CCRS also has the responsibility of maintaining the Atlas of Canada. The Atlas is a summary of the information acquired that is released to the general public.

The CCRS operates two remote sensing ground stations, the Gatineau Satellite Station and the Prince Albert Satellite Station.

== Sub-units ==
The department is coordinated into the following sub-units.

- Applications Division
- Data Acquisition Division
- Director General's Office
- Earth Observation and GeoSolutions Division
- GeoAccess Division
- Geomatics Canada - Geodetic Survey Division

== Selected Programs ==
GlobeSAR was a very important Program that propelled Canada and the Canada Centre for Remote Sensing as a key contributor to the international Earth Observation Community, and positioned companies such as Radarsat International Inc (now part of MacDonald Detwiller and Associates) and Intermap (formerly Intera) as key commercial partners in providing data and services based on Synthetic Aperture Radar imagery. The GlobeSAR program included the collection of airborne Synthetic Aperture Radar (SAR) imagery in Europe, the Middle East, Africa, and the Asia/Pacific region. The primary purpose of GlobeSAR was to strengthen the capability of the participating countries to use radar data in resource management applications, and to prepare for the use of data from the Canadian Radarsat-1 satellite which was launched in 1995. Canadian scientists and experts traveled throughout the world to collect, process and distribute the data to collaborating scientists in host countries. A series of training seminars were held over the course of several years, which greatly contributed to improving awareness and also developing applications of Synthetic Aperture Radar imagery.
