= Norman Moody =

British-Canadian electrical engineer (1915–2004)

Norman Moody (December 22, 1915 – October 23, 2004) was a British-Canadian electrical engineer.

Moody was born in Herne Bay in England. He was raised during the Great Depression and was unable to attend higher education. His first job in the electronics field was as a radio repair service in a major London department store. Around 1935, he joined Halcyon Radio, initially working on radio receiver design, but later moving to the company's experimental television department, becoming the senior engineer. He met his future wife, Joan, while working at Halcyon. He moved for one year to the television department of Burndept Radio.

In May 1940, he was asked to join a team developing aircraft interception (AI) radar systems at St Athen. Here he joined a team including two other engineers who would also later move to Canada, Bennett Lewis of Cambridge, and J. Rennie Whitehead from Manchester. Due to ongoing political issues and delays in the AI radar program, shortly after arriving the group was reorganized and they were sent to Worth Matravers where they worked under Freddie C. Williams.

During his time at Worth Matravers, Moody led development of the Phantastron and Sanatron circuits, which produced highly accurate time "ticks" that were used to measure distances on radar displays. This was a key advance that allowed the construction of the range gate that selected targets only within a selected range from the station. The selected target could then be automatically followed, greatly reducing operator workload. The basic concept would later be known as radar lock-on, but was referred to in the UK as lock-follow. In 1948, Williams and Moody co-wrote and article on these and other developments, leading to Moody winning the Institution of Electrical Engineers' Kelvin Award that year.

After a brief period working at Standard Telecommunication Laboratories, in 1947 he emmegrated to Canada to join the National Research Council's Chalk River Laboratories, where Bennett Lewis had moved during the war. He led a program developing electronic systems for atomic instrumentation. In 1951 he was ordered to return to the UK in secret to develop systems to measure gamma ray releases of atomic bombs, and was present at the UK's first nuclear test, Operation Hurricane, in 1952. He returned to Chalk River later in the year.

Among the Canadian members of the Hurricane team was Omond Solandt. On returning to Canada, Solandt invited Moody to head a new circuitry design department within the Defence Research Telecommunication Establishment in Ottawa. The department would develop a number of advanced systems over the next decades, including Doppler radar systems and the ionospheric measurement system used on the Alouette 1, the first Canadian satellite. He also began the program, mainly under David Florida, that designed and built the DRTE Computer.

In 1958, Arthur Porter became the dean of Engineering Department at the University of Saskatchewan. At a party that October, Porter had a conversation with William Feindel, which led to Porter becoming interested in the topic of measuring blood flow in the carotid artery. Porter had worked with Moody at Worth Matravers in 1943, and was aware of his work since in instrumentation, and invited him to Saskatchewan to develop such a device. The position of head of electrical engineering was vacant, so Porter invited Moody to take the position. However, Moody had no university education or degrees, which led to problems with the university president, John Spinks. Eventually the impasse was solved by granting Moody an honorary Bachelor of Engineering degree, and Moody joined the university in 1959.

In 1961, Porter was offered the position to start a new industrial engineering department at the University of Toronto. He found a similar interest in collaboration between engineering and medicine, especially as Ian Dalton of the engineering department had been working at the Hospital for Sick Children on heart-lung machines. This led to the formation of the Institute of Biomedical Electronics in July 1962, with Moody joining as the Director.

Porter stepped down from the Director position in 1975, and retired early in 1977, selling his Toronto home and cottage in Picton, Ontario, moving west to Victoria, BC. He worked part-time at the University of Victoria as an adjunct professor of physics. During his spare time he took up horology and constructed several complex clocks, including an improved model of the Congreve clock.

Norman Moody was made a Fellow of the Institution of Electrical Engineers in 1962, and elected as a Fellow of the Royal Society of Canada in 1972.
