= Marc McDermott (viral meme) =

Canadian mechanic who became a viral meme

Marc McDermott is a Canadian mechanic who made an illegal garbage dump on his property and became a viral meme in Quebec for stating that he had the right to do so ("J'ai l'doua"; "I have the right") .

== Biography ==
Marc McDermott lives in Cantley, Quebec, Canada, near Gatineau. He was homeless at 10 years old. He did not go to school. He eventually became a mechanic, and a friend for whom McDermott worked let him sleep at his upstair office. He has daughter who was 12 years old in 2017, whom he raised alone.

McDermott came to public eye after he started dumping garbage on his private property in Cantley without permission from the municipality around 2011. For months trucks came to the garbage dump during the night to dump trash. The pile of trash reached 7 meters in height at some places and was spread over almost 400 meters. McDermott claimed that he did nothing illegal, and that the pile was only of branches, dirt and concrete. However one of his neighbor claimed that there was also plastic and metal waste. The municipality attempted to resolve issues diplomatically with McDermott for around a year with no success, and it thus wished to go to court on the matters.

He was the subject of a news report in 2011, in which he claimed that he had the right ("J'ai l'doua", or in proper French "J'ai le droit") to do these activities. He thus became a viral meme.

In 2017, McDermott asked users to stop spreading the meme, and to stop making goods using his image. The phenomenon was likened to bullying and intimidation by the newspaper Le Quotidien. By then, some people asked for selfies with McDermott when crossing path with him.

In 2018, a Facebook page was made for Marc McDermott, claiming that he was a candidate for the Conservative Party of Quebec with the slogan « En 2018, vous avez “l’doua” au changement » ("In 2018, you have 'the right' to change"). It was fake.

In 2023, one of his houses burned down. No one was wounded, but McDermott lost the revenue from renting the place. He did not have insurance.
