= Polar Epsilon =

Polar Epsilon is a Canadian Forces project to provide enhanced all-weather day and night surveillance capabilities utilizing imagery from the RADARSAT-2 earth observation satellite. The project includes two new ground stations, one at each coast. Data is primarily used to support military operations, but can also be accessed by other departments or agencies.

== History ==
The Polar Epsilon project was approved on May 30, 2005. It uses information from RADARSAT-2, launched in December 2007, to produce imagery for Canadian military commanders to use in order to conduct operations in their areas of responsibility. The RADARSAT-2 information is used in many ways, including surveillance of Canada's Arctic region and maritime approaches, the detection of vessels, and support to CF operations globally. The implementation phase of Polar Epsilon began in March 2009 with the design and construction phase of two new RADARSAT-2 ground stations, by MacDonald Dettwiler and Associates (MDA), one on the east coast in Masstown, N.S., and the other on the west coast in Aldergrove, B.C. The ground stations will be wholly owned and operated by the Government of Canada and are expected to be operational by March 2011. Completion of the Polar Epsilon project is expected by late 2011.

The three satellites forming the RADARSAT Constellation launched on June 12, 2019, providing continuity of data for Polar Epsilon.
