= Stéphanie Vallée =

Canadian lawyer and politician

The Honourable Stéphanie Vallée

Member of the National Assembly of Quebec for Gatineau
- In office 26 March 2007 – 1 October 2018
- Preceded by: Réjean Lafrenière
- Succeeded by: Robert Bussière

Personal details
- Born: 24 September 1971 (age 54) Sherbrooke, Quebec, Canada
- Party: Quebec Liberal Party
- Profession: Lawyer, negotiator
- Portfolio: Education, Recreation, Sport, Family

Stéphanie Vallée (born 24 September 1971) is a French-Canadian politician, lawyer and negotiator in Quebec. She was a member of the National Assembly of Quebec (MNA) for the provincial riding of Gatineau from 2007 to 2018, as a member of the Quebec Liberal Party. Since 2014 she served as Minister of Justice for Quebec, but decided to leave electoral politics as of the 2018 provincial general election.

== Biography ==
Vallée studied at the University of Ottawa and obtained a bachelor's degree in civil law.

After working as an intern for two years, Vallée was a lawyer in Maniwaki for nearly 12 years, becoming a member of the Barreau du Quebec in 1995, and serving as a Member of the Conseil du Barreau of the former city of Hull. She also worked as a chief negotiator at the federal Department of Indian Affairs. In the 2007 election, she stood as the Liberal candidate for Gatineau, replacing outgoing incumbent MNA Réjean Lafrenière, who did not seek re-election.

In the election, she easily defeated five other candidates, including the Parti Québécois's Therese Yiel-Dery, Action democratique du Quebec's Martin Otis, the Green Party's Gail Walker (a former federal candidate), Quebec Solidaire's Carmen Boucher and the Marxist–Leninist candidate Lisa Leblanc. She was named the Parliamentary Secretary for the Minister of Education, Sport and Leisure, portfolios under the responsibility of Michelle Courchesne.

She was re-elected in 2012 and again in 2014. In 2014, she was named Minister of Justice and Minister responsible for the Outaouais.

Heavily involved in cultural affairs, she is a member of the Administration of the Gatineau Valley's Maison de la Culture. She has also worked as an administrator at a local community radio station CHGA-FM.

== Electoral record ==
2008 Quebec general election: Gatineau
Party	Candidate	Votes	%	±%
Liberal	Stéphanie Vallée	14,566	59.80	
Parti Québécois	Thérèse Viel-Déry	7,167	29.42	
Action démocratique	Serge Charette	2,318	9.52	
Marxist–Leninist	Benoit Legros	306	1.26	
Total valid votes		24,357	100.00	
Rejected and declined votes		423		
Turnout		24,780	49.48	
Electors on the lists		50,076		
Source: Official Results, Government of Quebec
