= David Logue =

David Logue MNA

Member of the National Assembly for Gatineau
- Incumbent
- Assumed office October 5, 2026
- Preceded by: Robert Bussière

Personal details
- Born: Maniwaki, Quebec, Canada
- Party: Liberal

David Logue is a Canadian politician who is a candidate for the National Assembly of Quebec for Gatineau in the 2026 Quebec general election as a member of the Quebec Liberal Party.
