= Gatineau Hills =

Hills in Quebec, Canada

Coordinates: 45°34′N 75°57′W

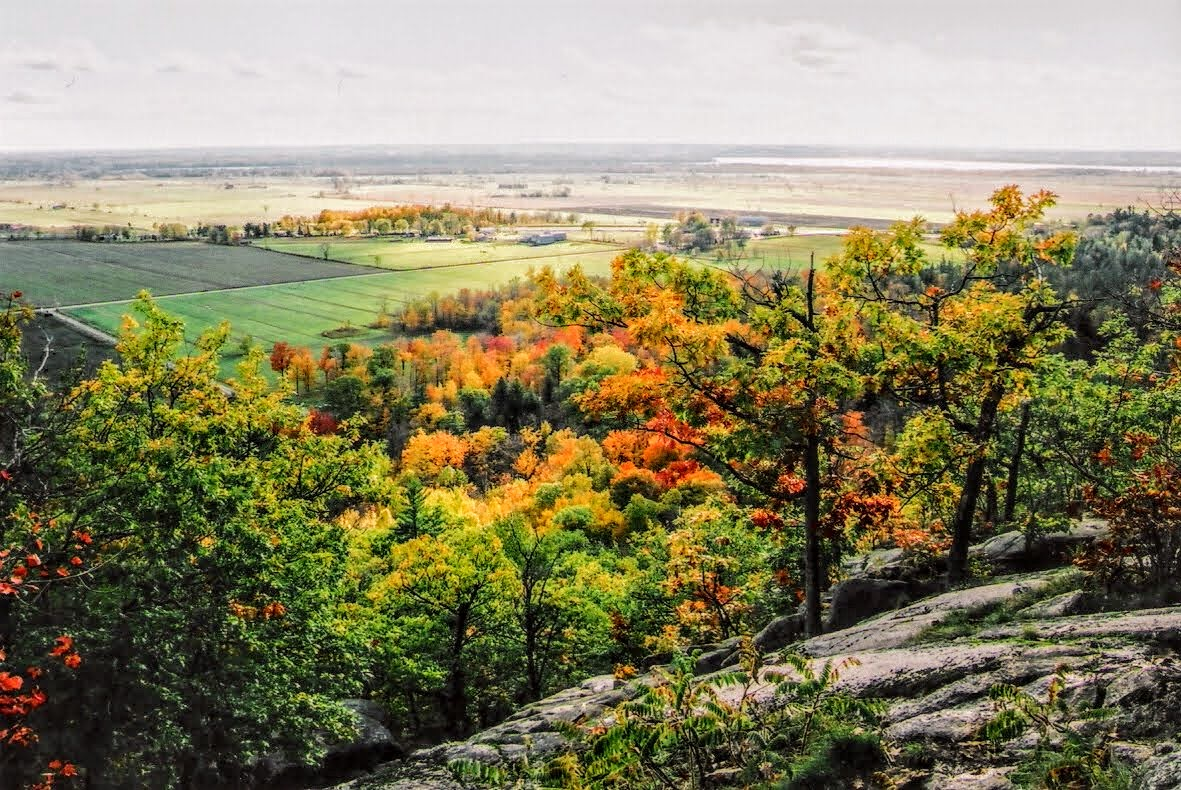
The view from Luskville Falls in the Gatineau Hills

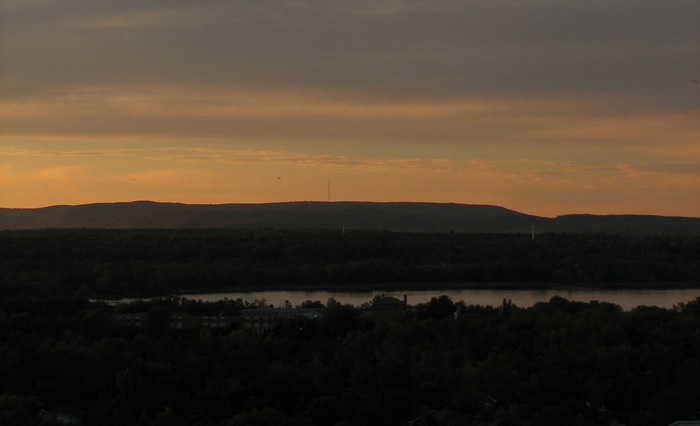
Gatineau Hills across Ottawa west end and Ottawa river

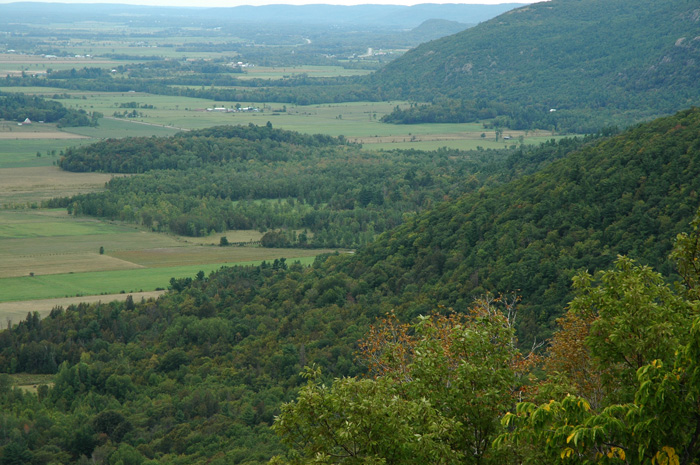
Ottawa valley at the skirts of the Gatineau Hills

The Gatineau Hills (French: Collines de la Gatineau) are a geological formation in Canada that makes up part of the southern tip of the Canadian Shield, and acts as the northern shoulder of the Ottawa Valley. They are also the foothills of the Laurentian Mountains which stretch east through Quebec, beginning north of Montreal and joining up with others into Vermont and New Hampshire.

== Geology ==
The geology of Gatineau Park, which encompasses these foothills, is related to the Eardley Escarpment, which is a fault line that lies along the southern edge of the hills. This escarpment makes the park an attractive location for rock climbers and hikers, offering a beautiful view of the relatively flat fields below, which extend to the Ottawa River. The Eardley Escarpment is part of the northern side of the Ottawa-Bonnechere Graben, which is an ancient rift valley.

== History ==
The Algonquin people settled in the Ottawa valley more than 4,000 years ago. French explorers arrived in the early seventeenth century. The Gatineau Hills' pine forests were logged extensively in the early 1800s, with many roads built for mining and farming. The deforestation raised increasing concern from the public. Historical records show interest for the creation of a wilderness park in the Gatineau Hills in 1903; many reports, plans and actions were made over the years to protect the area until it became as it looks today.

== Tourism ==
The Gatineau Hills are also a popular skiing destination, serving the neighbouring communities of Ottawa, Ontario and Gatineau, Quebec. Gatineau Park contains over 190 km of cross-country trails, and plays host to the annual Gatineau Loppet competition. Downhill skiing is available at locations including Camp Fortune, Mont Cascades, Mont Ste. Marie, Edelweiss, and Vorlage. The hills are small compared to the ski areas in the northeast, such as Mont Tremblant and Mont-Sainte-Anne, or in Vermont, New Hampshire and New York.

The location of the hills are also useful for communications, and Ryan Tower, a prominent communications tower at Camp Fortune, provides a large portion of the area's broadcast television and radio signals.

The area is a prime tourist attraction, particularly during the month of October when the foliage is turning colour. Photographs and paintings of the area are a popular tourist item.

The Gatineau Hills are located in the city of Gatineau, and in Les Collines-de-l'Outaouais Regional County Municipality, Quebec.
