= André-Michaux Ecological Reserve =

Ecological reserve in Quebec, Canada

- Réserve écologique André-Michaux
- IUCN category Ia (strict nature reserve)
- Location within Quebec
- Nearest city: Denholm, Quebec, Canada
- Coordinates: 45.8334°N 75.8869°W
- Area: 450 ha (1,100 acres)
- Established: 12 May 1993

The André-Michaux Ecological Reserve, or Réserve écologique André-Michaux, is an ecological reserve in Quebec, Canada. It protects a variety of vegetation types typically of the Canadian Shield.

== Location ==
The Réserve écologique André-Michaux is at 45.8334°N 75.8869°W, with an average elevation of 336 metres (1,102 ft). It is south of Île du Plomb, west of Denholm and east of Martindale. It is about 6 kilometres (3.7 mi) northeast of the municipality of Low, in La Vallée-de-la-Gatineau Regional County Municipality. It covers 450 hectares (1,100 acres) beside the Gatineau River. It is named in honour of the botanist and horticulturist André Michaux (1746-1803) who worked and published in Quebec and Europe.

== Terrain ==
The site is typical of the Canadian Shield highlands, with elevations ranging from 140 to 424 metres (459 to 1,391 ft). Rocks are paragneiss, amphibolites and granites. Surface deposits are mainly tills. Soils include Dystric Brunisols, Humo-Ferric podzols and lithosols on the rocky ridges.

== Ecology ==
The reserve protects representative ecosystems of the Lower Gatineau ecological region, including stands of maple-basswood and maple-yellow birch. Depending its location on the slopes the vegetation may be xeric, swampy, or a range of intermediate groups. Xeric vegetation on the upper slopes with convex forms includes white pine and red pine, with red oak in the driest places, and stunted red oak in extremely arid places. On poorly drained flat land there is fir / white spruce, sphagnum and black ash / grey alder. There are grasses and swamp shrubs along the edges of lakes. In the intermediate areas of moderate drainage there are maple / basswood groves, and some drier varieties such as red oak or bur oak, maple / yellow birch, and hemlock. Galearis spectabilis may also be found. Fauna include white-tailed deer, beaver, heron, ruffed grouse and black duck.

== Sources ==
- "Réserve écologique André-Michaux", Mapcarta
- Réserve écologique André-Michaux (in French), Quebec: Ministère du Développement durable, de l'Environnement et de la Lutte contre les changements climatiques
