= Prince Albert Radar Laboratory =

The Prince Albert Radar Laboratory (PARL) was a radar research facility operated by the Defence Research Telecommunications Establishment (DRTE), part of the Canadian Defence Research Board. Its primary purpose was to test long-range radio propagation and radar techniques in the presence of the aurora borealis. This was part of a greater ABM effort being carried out in concert with the United States Air Force, and PARL operated along with two similar instruments at the Rome Air Development Centre and MIT Lincoln Laboratory. The site continues to operate today, used as a satellite downlink station known as the Prince Albert Satellite Station (PASS).

The original study that led to PARL came about as the side effect of questions about the effects of the aurora on radar systems. There was some concern that the aurora could shield incoming reentry vehicles from observation until they were too low to be effectively attacked by the long range interceptor missiles then being designed (Nike Zeus). The United States Air Force sent a request to Peter Forsyth for further information. Forsyth had done extensive research on the aurora while earning his PhD at the University of Saskatchewan, Saskatoon, including the first observations using radar.

Forsyth was invited to a meeting at Rome, the outcome eventually led to an agreement whereby two radars would be sent to Canada, one would be placed in Churchill, Manitoba where the aurora is often at its maximum, while another would be located a distance away at a lower "grazing angle" in order to compare the returns from two different locations. Finding a suitable location was not difficult; they wanted a site near Saskatoon so travel from the University would not be onerous, but one that would have line-of-sight visibility of Churchill. At first a site outside Dundurn was considered, but eventually Prince Albert was selected instead. This may have had a lot to do with Prince Albert being in the home riding of the Prime Minister, John Diefenbaker.

After a visit to Millstone Hill Observatory, where the Lincoln Lab was developing what would become the BMEWS radar, a suitable lab for the Prince Albert site was selected. The Millstone Hill site used a prefab steel building, but a Canadian equivalent was selected in its place, and construction on the "silo" for the radar started while the buildings arrived and were assembled.

The BMEWS radar operated on a frequency of 448 MHz with a peak design power of 2.5 MW and maximum average power of 100 kW. The output was fed via waveguide to an 84 foot parabolic reflector mounted on an altazimuth mount. It was equipped with a conical scanning feed, providing higher resolution and making automatic tracking easier.

Limited operations started in 1959. The official opening was on June 6, 1959, by John Diefenbaker. For this event, a recorded message by U.S. President Dwight D. Eisenhower was to be broadcast from the Millstone Hill site, reflected off the Moon, and received at PARL. After some tense debugging prior to the attempt, the "trick" went off without a hitch.

The main purpose of the instrument was radar observation of the aurora, which started in January 1960 and were carried out for some time. Rockets fired from the Churchill Rocket Research Range, often Black Brants, were tracked by PARL at angles similar to those that the BMEWS radar would be tracking over-pole missile launches from its sites in Alaska and Greenland. PARL also tracked Arcas rockets fired from Cold Lake. In order to support this work, an experimental computer built at the DRTE in Ottawa, known only as the DRTE Computer, was adapted to create the Digital Analyzer and Recorder, or DAR.

The site was also used as a space radar system, starting a satellite tracking program in February 1960. The radar was used to track the decay of several satellites, including Sputnik 3, 4 and 5, Delta 2, and Epsilon 2. Sputnik 4 was the first test of the Vostok spacecraft; after launch its orbital period was 91.27 minutes, but on May 19 the PARL staff noted that the period was 94.26 minutes and it had been joined by seven new objects. It is assumed this was due to an explosion. PARL also used the Echo 1 satellite in a repetition of the earlier Moon-bounce experiments.

After being operational only a short time, on January 31, 1961 a major fire broke out that destroyed the buildings. Contrary to the findings of the government, the "equivalent" building did not have nearly the same fireproofing as the US design, and the fire proved unstoppable. Some of the equipment was saved, and replacements forthcoming, and the radar was soon in operation again. DAR was one of the instruments lost in the 1961 fire, and a replacement had to be built, arriving in 1962.

PARL later served a number of roles. For some time it was the major Canadian ground receiving station for satellite communications, both for US satellites, and the Canadian Alouette 1. The DRTE Computer was used in this role too, calculating the path of the satellite over the PARL site, allowing the radar dish to be steered into the proper location to receive the signals from the quickly moving source. In 1968 the distance from the Algonquin Radio Observatory to the PARL site was measured to 2,143 km +/- 20 m.

Today the Prince Albert Satellite Station is operated by Canada Centre for Remote Sensing a branch of Natural Resources Canada as a ground station for the following satellites:

- Landsat-8
- RADARSAT-2
- NEOSSat
- SCISAT
