= John S. MacDonald =

Canadian engineer, businessman, and academic (1936–2019)

John Spencer MacDonald, OC (August 13, 1936 – December 26, 2019) was a Canadian engineer, businessman, and academic. He was co-founder of MacDonald, Dettwiler and Associates (MDA), an aerospace, information systems, and technology company. MacDonald served as the chancellor at the University of Northern British Columbia from 2010 through 2016.

== Early life and education ==
MacDonald was born in Prince Rupert, British Columbia in 1936 to Neil and Alice MacDonald. His father was a Scottish immigrant and the captain of a BC Fisheries inspection vessel responsible for inspecting offshore fishing fleets throughout the north coast of BC. As a child, John was exposed to marine radio technologies at a neighbour's basement shop and discovered that he had a natural aptitude for the systems. By the age of 16 he was spending his summer months traveling up and down the coast fixing radios on the various fleets and tourist boats.

Upon graduation from high school he moved to Vancouver, British Columbia to attend the school of Applied Science at the University of British Columbia (UBC), where he graduated with a bachelor's degree with honours in electrical engineering in 1959. Following his program at UBC, he was accepted to the engineering program at the Massachusetts Institute of Technology (MIT), where he earned a master's degree in 1961 and PhD in electrical engineering in 1964.

== Career ==
As an undergraduate student at UBC, MacDonald spent his first three summers on a survey crew in Northern British Columbia. After his fourth and fifth years he worked as a student engineer at Atomic Energy of Canada Limited's Chalk River Laboratories in Ontario, where he met his future wife, Alfredette, before moving to Boston to attend MIT.

Upon graduation from MIT, where he had worked as a teaching assistant and discovered an aptitude for teaching, MacDonald aspired to be a professor at the prestigious school. He was offered a position as an assistant professor at MIT and spent a year in this role when he was approached by UBC to join the staff of the electrical engineering department there, which he accepted. In 1965 he moved his young family back to Vancouver and started his career as a professor at UBC. By 1968 he was feeling the urge to try his hand at entrepreneurship and, with his friend and colleague, Vern Dettwiler, founded MacDonald, Dettwiler and Associates in the basement of his Vancouver home in 1969 while continuing to serve as a professor at UBC. By 1973, the demands of his role at MDA caused him to leave the university and work full time with the fledgling technology company. He served as president and CEO of MDA until 1982, and as chairman of the board from 1982 to 1998. In addition to professorships in electrical engineering at MIT and UBC, MacDonald has served in an advisory capacity to the government and on the board of directors of numerous companies.

In 2001, MacDonald co-founded Day4 Energy, a company that designed, manufactured and sold high performance solar electric modules. Day4 Energy went on to have one of the largest IPOs in Canada in 2007, at over $100 million and grew to almost 300 employees. In 2014, MacDonald retired from Day 4 Energy.

== Honours ==
MacDonald was named an Officer of the Order of Canada in November 1988 and invested in April 1989.

In 2008 MacDonald was awarded the British Columbia Technology Industry Association (BCTIA) Impact Award for Person of the Year in recognition of his contributions to science and the BC High Technology Industry. Day4 Energy also won the Impact Award for Emerging Company of the Year.

He was a Fellow of the Institute of Electrical and Electronics Engineers (IEEE), founding Fellow of the Canadian Academy of Engineering, and Fellow of the Canadian Aeronautics and Space Institute

MacDonald died on 26 December 2019 at the age of 83.
