= Mont Ste. Marie =

Privately owned ski resort in Quebec, Canada

Coordinates: 45°56′28″N 75°52′26″W

Mont Ste. Marie Ski Resort
- Interactive map of Mont Ste. Marie Ski Resort
- Location: Lac-Sainte-Marie, Quebec, Canada
- Vertical: 1,000 ft (300 m)
- Top elevation: 1,600 ft (490 m)
- Base elevation: 592 ft (180 m)
- Skiable area: 100 acres (0.40 km^{2})
- Trails: 20
- Lift system: 3 (2 chairlifts, 1 surface lifts)
- Lift capacity: 5,900/hr
- Snowfall: 170 cm (67 in)
- Night skiing: No Night Skiing
- Website: Mont Ste. Marie

Mont Ste. Marie is a privately owned ski resort 1 hour north of Ottawa in Lac-Sainte-Marie, Quebec, Canada. It was pioneered as a ski area by John Clifford (1923–2002) and 50 investors, mostly Anglophone, in the 1960s. Much later, from 1997 and 2002, Mont Ste. Marie was owned by Intrawest, a real estate development corporation, known for such places as Tremblant, Quebec, and Whistler Blackcomb, B.C., and little was done to improve Mont-Ste.-Marie.

== Stats ==
- Vertical: 288.6 vertical meters
- Number of Trails: 20
- Skiable Acreage: 100
- Total Lifts: 3 (Two High-Speed quads and 1 surface lift)
- Lift Capacity per hour: 5,900
- Snowmaking: snowmaking is possible with 200 state of the art snowguns (100% of skiable terrain is covered by snowmaking)
- Total operating days for winter season: 125 (average)
- Average annual snowfall: 300 cm

== Real Estate ==
- Residence du Cheval Blanc
- Private Homes throughout

== See also ==
- Calabogie Peaks
- Camp Fortune
- Mount Pakenham
