= Gatineau (provincial electoral district) =

Provincial electoral district in Quebec, Canada

Quebec electoral district
- Coordinates: 45.640°N 75.912°W

Provincial electoral district
- Legislature: National Assembly of Quebec
MNA
David Logue
Liberal
- District created: 1930
- First contested: 1931
- Last contested: 2026

Demographics
- Population (2006): 65,419
- Electors (2012): 55,883
- Area (km²): 15,565.1
- Pop. density (per km²): 4.2
- Census division(s): Gatineau, La Vallée-de-la-Gatineau, Les Collines-de-l'Outaouais
- Census subdivision(s): Gatineau (part), Aumond, Blue Sea, Bois-Franc, Bouchette, Cantley, Cayamant, Chelsea, Déléage, Denholm, Egan-Sud, Gracefield, Grand-Remous, Kazabazua, La Pêche, Lac-Sainte-Marie, Low, Maniwaki, Messines, Montcerf-Lytton, Sainte-Thérèse-de-la-Gatineau, Val-des-Monts, Kitigan Zibi, Lac-Rapide, Cascades-Malignes, Dépôt-Échouani, Lac-Lenôtre, Lac-Moselle, Lac-Pythonga

Gatineau (French pronunciation: [ɡatino]) is a provincial electoral district in the Outaouais region of Quebec, Canada, that elects members to the National Assembly of Quebec. It includes parts of the city of Gatineau, as well as Val-des-Monts, Cantley, and La Pêche.

The district was created from parts of Hull for the 1931 election.

In the transition from the 2001 to the 2011 electoral map, it gained Val-des-Monts from the Papineau electoral district but lost some territory to the Chapleau electoral district.

== Members of the Legislative Assembly / National Assembly ==
Legislature	Years	Member	Party
Riding created from Hull
18th	1931–1935	Augustin-Armand Legault	Liberal
19th	1935–1936	Joseph Barthélemi Merleau	Liberal
20th	1936–1939	Georges-Adélard Auger	Union Nationale
21st	1939–1944	Joseph-Célestin Nadon	Liberal
22nd	1944–1948	Joseph-Célestin Nadon	Liberal
23rd	1948–1952	Gérard Desjardins	Union Nationale
24th	1952–1956	Gérard Desjardins	Union Nationale
25th	1956–1960	Gérard Desjardins	Union Nationale
26th	1960–1962	Gérard Desjardins	Union Nationale
27th	1962–1966	Roy Fournier	Liberal
28th	1966–1970	Roy Fournier	Liberal
29th	1970–1972	Roy Fournier	Liberal
29th	1972–1973	Michel Gratton	Liberal
30th	1973–1976	Michel Gratton	Liberal
31st	1976–1981	Michel Gratton	Liberal
32nd	1981–1985	Michel Gratton	Liberal
33rd	1985–1989	Michel Gratton	Liberal
34th	1989–1994	Réjean Lafrenière	Liberal
35th	1994–1998	Réjean Lafrenière	Liberal
36th	1998–2003	Réjean Lafrenière	Liberal
37th	2003–2007	Réjean Lafrenière	Liberal
38th	2007–2008	Stéphanie Vallée	Liberal
39th	2008–2012	Stéphanie Vallée	Liberal
40th	2012–2014	Stéphanie Vallée	Liberal
41st	2014–2018	Stéphanie Vallée	Liberal
42nd	2018–2022	Robert Bussière	Coalition Avenir Québec
43rd	2022–2026	Robert Bussière	Coalition Avenir Québec
44th	2026–Present	David Logue	Liberal

== Election results ==
2026 Quebec general election
** Preliminary results — Not yet official **
Party	Candidate	Votes	%	±%
Liberal	David Logue	15,547	41.67	+22.11
Parti Québécois	Raphaël Déry	8,308	22.27	+12.56
Conservative	Ogbognon Bertin Oboussou	6,303	16.89	+6.13
Coalition Avenir Québec	William Robertson	3,988	10.69	–36.05
Québec solidaire	Emmanuelle Tremblay	2,903	7.78	–4.32
Climat Québec	Pierre Brabant	265	0.71	N/A
Total valid votes		37,314	99.01	+0.05
Total rejected ballots		374	0.99	–0.05
Turnout		37,688	60.84	+2.05
Electors on the lists		61,945		
Liberal gain from Coalition Avenir Québec		Swing		+4.78
Source: Élections Québec

2022 Quebec general election
Party	Candidate	Votes	%	±%
Coalition Avenir Québec	Robert Bussière	17,055	46.74	+5.00
Liberal	Caryl Green	7,137	19.56	-10.93
Québec solidaire	Laura Avalos	4,415	12.10	-0.83
Conservative	Joëlle Jammal	3,927	10.76	+8.77
Parti Québécois	Raphaël Déry	3,542	9.71	+0.70
Canadian	Danilo Velasquez	327	0.90	–
Démocratie directe	Robert Dupuis	88	0.24	–
Total valid votes		36,491	98.96	–
Total rejected ballots		383	1.04	-0.21
Turnout		36,874	58.79	-1.00
Electors on the lists		62,726	–	–
Coalition Avenir Québec hold		Swing		+7.96

2018 Quebec general election
Party	Candidate	Votes	%	±%
Coalition Avenir Québec	Robert Bussière	14,586	41.74	+27.73
Liberal	Luce Farrell	10,654	30.49	-31.09
Québec solidaire	Milan Bernard	4,517	12.93	+6.85
Parti Québécois	Jonathan Carreiro-Benoit	3,148	9.01	-8.5
Green	Jasper Boychuk	1,271	3.64	
Conservative	Mario Belec	697	1.99	
Marxist–Leninist	Alexandre Deschênes	71	0.2	
Total valid votes		34,944	98.75	
Total rejected ballots		441	1.25	
Turnout		35,385	59.78	
Eligible voters		59,189		
Coalition Avenir Québec gain from Liberal		Swing		+29.41
Source(s) "Rapport des résultats officiels du scrutin". Élections Québec.

2014 Quebec general election
Party	Candidate	Votes	%	±%
Liberal	Stéphanie Vallée	22,852	61.58	+15.91
Parti Québécois	Cédric Sarault	6,497	17.51	–9.84
Coalition Avenir Québec	André Paradis	5,198	14.01	–4.77
Québec solidaire	Alexis Harvey	2,255	6.08	+1.61
Option nationale	Marcel Vaive	160	0.43	–0.58
Marxist–Leninist	Alexandre Deschênes	146	0.39	+0.15
Total valid votes		37,108		
Liberal hold		Swing		+12.88

2012 Quebec general election
Party	Candidate	Votes	%	±%
Liberal	Stéphanie Vallée	16,835	45.67	–14.13
Parti Québécois	Maude Tremblay	10,083	27.35	–2.07
Coalition Avenir Québec	Michel Halloran	6,923	18.78	+9.26
Québec solidaire	Francis Da Silva-Casimiro	1,648	4.47	
Green	Brandon Bolduc	913	2.48	
Option nationale	Nicholas Lepage	372	1.01	
Marxist–Leninist	Yvon Breton	87	0.24	–1.02
Total valid votes		36,861		
Liberal hold		Swing		–6.03
Change for Coalition Avenir Québec is based on Action démocratique results

2008 Quebec general election
Party	Candidate	Votes	%	±%
Liberal	Stéphanie Vallée	14,566	59.80	+14.85
Parti Québécois	Thérèse Viel-Déry	7,167	29.42	+5.59
Action démocratique	Serge Charette	2,318	9.52	-11.79
Marxist–Leninist	Benoit Legros	306	1.26	+0.78

2007 Quebec general election
Party	Candidate	Votes	%	±%
Liberal	Stéphanie Vallée	13,602	44.95	-15.74
Parti Québécois	Thérèse Viel-Déry	7,210	23.83	-0.71
Action démocratique	Martin Otis	6,447	21.31	+8.44
Green	Gail Lemmon Walker	1,958	6.47	-
Québec solidaire	Carmen J. Boucher	896	2.96	+1.40*
Marxist–Leninist	Lisa Leblanc	146	0.48	+0.13

* Increase is from UFP

2003 Quebec general election
Party	Candidate	Votes	%	±%
Liberal	Réjean Lafrenière	16,481	60.69	-0.84
Parti Québécois	Dominique Bedwell	6,663	24.54	-6.29
Action démocratique	Brian Gibb	3,494	12.87	+6.90
UFP	Julie Mercier	423	1.56	-
Marxist–Leninist	Françoise Roy	95	0.35	+0.05

1998 Quebec general election
Party	Candidate	Votes	%	±%
Liberal	Réjean Lafrenière	18,481	61.53	-3.52
Parti Québécois	Eric Singh	9,259	30.83	-1.15
Action démocratique	Dominic Desrochers	1,794	5.97	-
Natural Law	Yvan Dolan	208	0.69	-0.19
Socialist Democracy	Benoît Giguère	202	0.67	-
Marxist–Leninist	Françoise Roy	90	0.30	-

1995 Quebec referendum
Side	Votes	%
Non	25,254	70.10
Oui	10,774	29.90

1994 Quebec general election
Party	Candidate	Votes	%	±%
Liberal	Réjean Lafrenière	19,046	65.05	+9.05
Parti Québécois	Richard Pinard	9,363	31.98	-0.78
Lemon	Viviane Paré	609	2.08	-
Natural Law	Deborah C. Abécassis	259	0.88	-

1992 Charlottetown Accord referendum
Side	Votes	%
Oui	16,508	58.87
Non	11,534	41.13

1989 Quebec general election
Party	Candidate	Votes	%	±%
Liberal	Réjean Lafrenière	12,179	56.00	-9.23
Parti Québécois	Jocelyne Gadbois	7,125	32.76	+4.15
Unity	Ivan Rathwell	2,446	11.25	-

1985 Quebec general election
Party	Candidate	Votes	%	±%
Liberal	Michel Gratton	13,571	65.23	+10.67
Parti Québécois	Cléo Fournier	5,952	28.61	-15.19
Progressive Conservative	Joseph Mayer	673	3.23	-
New Democrat	Luc Villemaire	532	2.56	-
Christian Socialist	Nathalie Simon	78	0.37	-

1981 Quebec general election
Party	Candidate	Votes	%	±%
Liberal	Michel Gratton	12,244	54.56	+5.58
Parti Québécois	André Racine	9,828	43.80	+17.22
Union Nationale	Gérald Archambault	369	1.64	-17.61

1980 Quebec referendum
Side	Votes	%
Non	26,807	74.98
Oui	8,943	25.02

1976 Quebec general election
Party	Candidate	Votes	%	±%
Liberal	Michel Gratton	13,444	48.98	-21.17
Parti Québécois	Marc-André Tardif	7,296	26.58	+10.17
Union Nationale	Jacques-H. Crépeau	5,285	19.25	+15.41
Ralliement créditiste	Gérard Ouellet	1,425	5.19	-5.01

== See also ==
- List of Quebec provincial electoral districts
- Canadian provincial electoral districts
