= Augustin-Armand Legault =

Canadian politician

Augustin-Armand Legault (October 12, 1884 – December 19, 1934) was a Canadian lawyer, educator and politician in Quebec. He represented Gatineau in the National Assembly of Quebec from 1931 to 1934 as a Liberal.

The son of Augustin Legault and Edwidge Drouin, he was born in Saint-Hermas. Legault was educated at the École normale Jacques-Cartier in Montreal, at Bridgetown Collegiate Institute and Chatham Collegiate Institute. He taught schools in Quebec, Ontario, Manitoba, Saskatchewan and Alberta. He studied law at McGill University and the Université Laval and articled with Joseph-Léonide Perron. He was called to the Bar of Quebec in 1915 and practised in Maniwaki.

In 1921, he married Irène Roy.

Legault ran unsuccessfully as an independent Liberal in the Hull riding in 1927. He was elected as a Liberal in 1931 for Gatineau.

He served as mayor of Maniwaki from 1920 to 1927 and 1930 to 1934, dying in office during his final term. He was prefect for Hull County from 1925 to 1927.

His brother-in-law Alphonse Fournier was a member of the Canadian House of Commons.

Legault died in office in Maniwaki at the age of 50.
