= Robert Bussière =

Canadian politician

Member of the National Assembly of Quebec for Gatineau
- In office October 1, 2018 – August 27, 2026
- Preceded by: Stéphanie Vallée
- Succeeded by: David Logue

Personal details
- Born: 1955 (age 70–71) Otter Lake, Quebec
- Party: Coalition Avenir Québec

Robert Bussière is a Canadian politician, who was elected to the National Assembly of Quebec in the 2018 provincial election. He represented the electoral district of Gatineau as a member of the Coalition Avenir Québec. He did not seek re-election in the 2026 general election.

Prior to his election to the legislature, Bussière served as mayor of La Pêche from 1997 to 2017. He served on municipal council from 1989 to 1997 and was the Warden of the Les Collines-de-l'Outaouais Regional County Municipality from 2009 to 2017.

== Electoral record ==
=== Provincial ===
2022 Quebec general election: Gatineau
Party	Candidate	Votes	%	±%
Coalition Avenir Québec	Robert Bussière	17,055	46.74	+5.00
Liberal	Caryl Green	7,137	19.56	-10.93
Québec solidaire	Laura Avalos	4,415	12.10	-0.83
Conservative	Joëlle Jammal	3,927	10.76	+8.77
Parti Québécois	Raphaël Déry	3,542	9.71	+0.70
Canadian	Danilo Velasquez	327	0.90	–
Démocratie directe	Robert Dupuis	88	0.24	–
Total valid votes		36,491	98.96	–
Total rejected ballots		383	1.04	-0.21
Turnout		36,874	58.79	-1.00
Electors on the lists		62,726	–	–
Coalition Avenir Québec hold		Swing		+7.96

2018 Quebec general election: Gatineau
Party	Candidate	Votes	%	±%
Coalition Avenir Québec	Robert Bussière	14,586	41.74	+27.73
Liberal	Luce Farrell	10,654	30.49	-31.09
Québec solidaire	Milan Bernard	4,517	12.93	+6.85
Parti Québécois	Jonathan Carreiro-Benoit	3,148	9.01	-8.5
Green	Jasper Boychuk	1,271	3.64	
Conservative	Mario Belec	697	1.99	
Marxist–Leninist	Alexandre Deschênes	71	0.2	
Total valid votes		34,944	98.75	
Total rejected ballots		441	1.25	
Turnout		35,385	59.78	
Eligible voters		59,189		
Coalition Avenir Québec gain from Liberal		Swing		+29.41
Source(s) "Rapport des résultats officiels du scrutin". Élections Québec.
