= Mount Pakenham =

Ski hill in Ontario, Canada

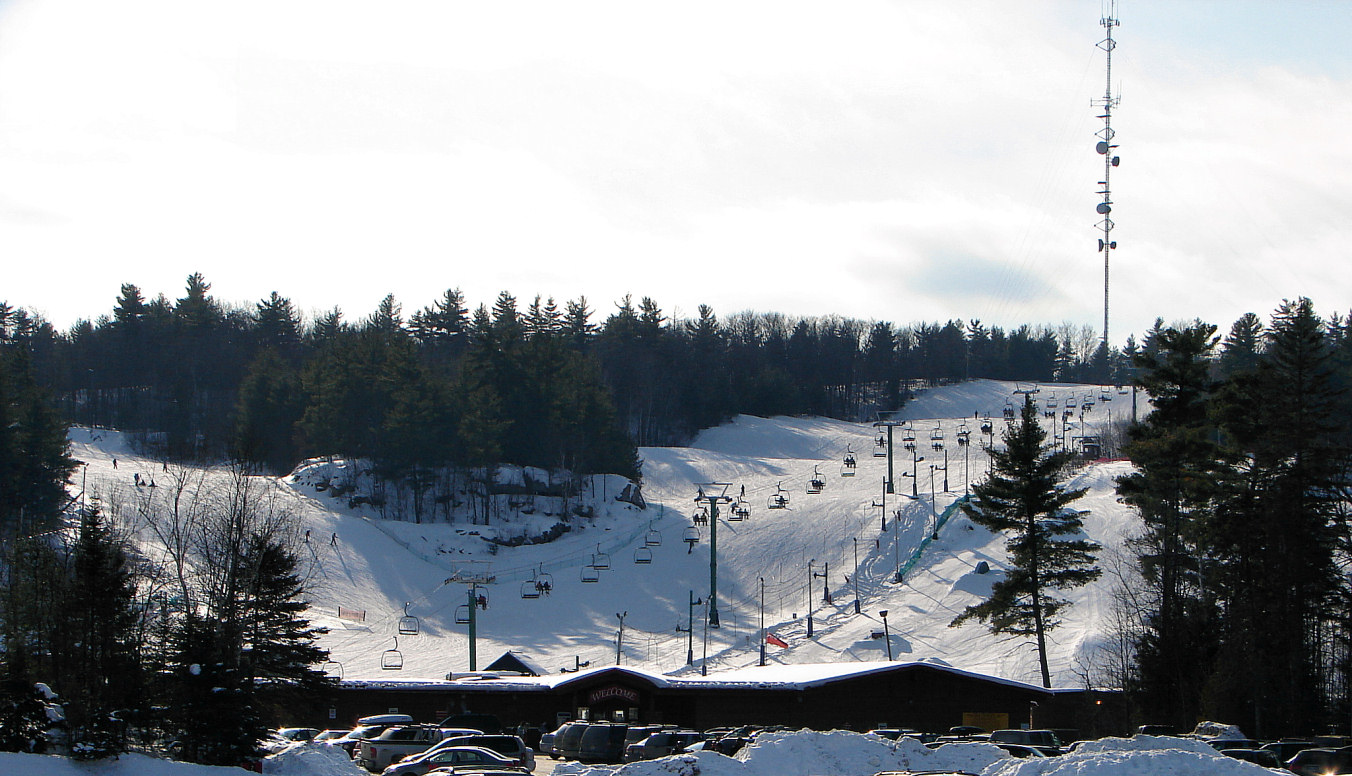

- Location within Southern Ontario Location within Ontario
- Location: Ontario, Canada
- Nearest city: Ottawa, Ontario
- Coordinates: 45°19′14″N 76°20′17″W
- Vertical: 85 m (280 ft)
- Top elevation: 220 m (730 ft)
- Base elevation: 140 m (450 ft)
- Skiable area: 22.3 ha (55 acres)
- Trails: 10
- Lift system: 2 working quad chairs 1 rope tow 1 carpet tow 1 handle tow
- Snowfall: up to 60 in (150 cm)
- Website: www.mountpakenham.com

Mount Pakenham is a ski hill to the south-west of Ottawa, Ontario, Canada, near the town of Pakenham.

== See also ==
- Calabogie Peaks – nearby ski resort
- Camp Fortune
- List of ski areas and resorts in Canada
