= Radarsat-1 =

Canadian Earth observation satellite (1995–2013)

RADARSAT-1
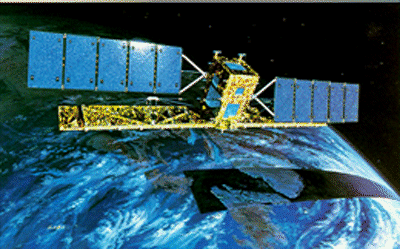
- RADARSAT-1 satellite
- Mission type: Earth observation
- Operator: Canadian Space Agency
- COSPAR ID: 1995-059A
- SATCAT no.: 23710
- Website: www.asc-csa.gc.ca/eng/satellites/radarsat1/
- Mission duration: 5 years (planned); 17 years, 4 months, 24 days (achieved)

Spacecraft properties
- Bus: RADARSAT
- Manufacturer: MDA (formerly Spar Aerospace); Ball Aerospace
- Launch mass: 2,750 kg (6,060 lb)
- Power: 2.1 kW

Start of mission
- Launch date: 4 November 1995, 14:22 UTC
- Rocket: Delta II 7920-10
- Launch site: Vandenberg, SLC-2W
- Contractor: Boeing

End of mission
- Last contact: 29 March 2013

Orbital parameters
- Reference system: Geocentric orbit
- Regime: Low Earth orbit
- Perigee altitude: 793 km (493 mi)
- Apogee altitude: 821 km (510 mi)
- Inclination: 98.60°
- Period: 100.70 minutes

RADARSAT-1 was Canada's first commercial Earth observation satellite. It utilized synthetic aperture radar (SAR) to obtain images of the Earth's surface to manage natural resources and monitor global climate change. As of March 2013, the satellite was declared non-operational and is no longer collecting data.

== Mission ==
RADARSAT-1 was launched at 14:22 UTC on 4 November 1995, from Vandenberg Air Force Base in California, into a Sun-synchronous orbit (dawn-dusk) above the Earth with an altitude of 798 km (496 mi) and inclination of 98.60°. Developed under the management of the Canadian Space Agency (CSA) in co-operation with Canadian provincial governments and the private sector, it provided images of the Earth for both scientific and marketing purposes. RADARSAT-1's images were useful in many fields, including agriculture, cartography, hydrology, forestry, oceanography, geology, ice and ocean monitoring, arctic surveillance, and detecting ocean oil slicks.

== History ==
The Canadian Space Agency (CSA) RADARSAT-1 project was conceived in the early 1980s and included discussions with NASA.

NASA provided the Delta II launch vehicle to launch RADARSAT-1 and access to the NASA Deep Space Network (NASA DSN) in exchange for access to its data. Estimates are that the project, excluding launch, cost CA$620 million. The Canadian federal government contributed about CA$500 million, the four participating provinces (Québec, Ontario, Saskatchewan and British Columbia) about CA$57 million, and the private sector about CA$63 million.

RADARSAT International, Inc. (RSI), a Canadian private company, was created in 1989 to process, market and distribute RADARSAT-1 data. (RADARSAT International, Inc. (RSI) was later acquired by MacDonald Dettwiler and Associates.) In 2006, RSI was rebranded MDA Geospatial Services International or MDA GSI.

== Payload ==
RADARSAT-1 used a synthetic aperture radar (SAR) sensor was designed under the leadership of Dr. Peter Wood and built by Canadian Astronautics Limited (CAL) in Ottawa, to image the Earth at a single microwave frequency of 5.3 GHz, in the C band (wavelength of 5.6 cm). The SAR support structure was designed and manufactured by Northrop Grumman Astro Aerospace and deployed to 15 m (49 ft) in length on orbit. Unlike optical satellites that sense reflected sunlight, SAR systems transmitted microwave energy towards the surface and recorded the reflections. Thus, Radarsat-1 imaged the Earth, day or night, in any atmospheric condition, such as cloud cover, rain, snow, dust or haze.

Each of RADARSAT-1's seven beam modes offered a different image resolution. The modes included Fine, which covers an area of 50 × 50 km (31 × 31 mi) (2,500 km^{2} (970 sq mi)) with a resolution of 10 m (33 ft); Standard, which covered an area of 100 × 100 km (62 × 62 mi) (10,000 km^{2} (3,900 sq mi)) and had a resolution of 30 m (98 ft); and ScanSAR wide, which covered a 500 × 500 km (310 × 310 mi) (250,000 km^{2} (97,000 sq mi)) area with a resolution of 100 m (330 ft). RADARSAT-1 also had the unique ability to direct its beam at different angles.

== Orbit ==
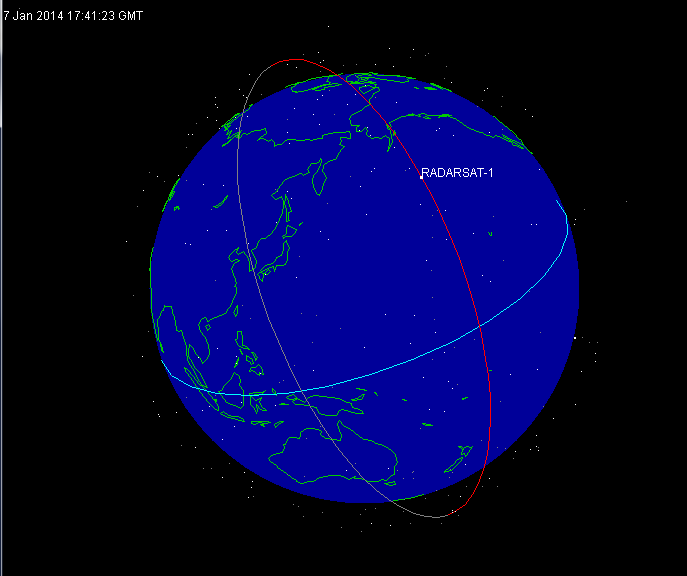
Orbital trace of Radarsat-1

With an orbital period of 100.70 minutes, RADARSAT-1 circled the Earth 14 times a day. The orbit path repeated every 24 days, meaning that the satellite was in exactly the same location and could take the same image (same beam mode and beam position) every 24 days. This was useful for interferometry and detecting changes at that location that took place during the 24 days. Using different beam positions, a location could also be scanned every few days.

RADARSAT-1 was a right-looking satellite, meaning that the microwave beam transmits and receives on the right side of the satellite, relative to its orbital path. As it descends in its orbit from the North Pole, it faces west, and when it ascends from the South Pole, it faces east. Locations could therefore be imaged from opposite sides. Combined with the different beam modes and positions, this provided users with many possible perspectives from which to image a location.

== End of service ==
On 4 November 2010, RADARSAT-1 celebrated its 15-year service anniversary. It outlived its planned five-year lifetime by a wide margin. Radarsat-2 was launched on 14 December 2007 from Baikonur, Kazakhstan

RADARSAT-1 covered the Arctic daily, and most of Canada every 72 hours depending on instrument orientation and mode. It covered the entire Earth every 24 days.

On 29 March 2013, RADARSAT-1 experienced a technical problem. The Canadian Space Agency (CSA) assembled a team of engineers, who conducted an extensive investigation. Following numerous attempts to resolve the problem, the CSA, in consultation with its commercial data distributor MDA Geospatial Services Inc. concluded that RADARSAT-1 was no longer operational.

== See also ==
- RADARSAT-2
- RADARSAT Constellation
