= Gérard Desjardins =

Canadian politician

Gérard Desjardins (June 27, 1909 – December 25, 1962) was a Canadian politician in Quebec. He represented

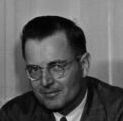
Gérard Desjardins, 1948

Gatineau in the Quebec National Assembly from 1948 to 1962 as a Union Nationale member.

The son of Ovila Desjardins, a farmer, and Alma Miron, he was born in Lac-des-Écorces. He was educated there and went on to earn a commercial diploma from the Séminaire Saint-Joseph in Mont-Laurier. From 1927 to 1934, he was a clerk for the Canadian International Paper Company; in 1934, he was transferred to their office in Maniwaki where he later became responsible for accounting, working there until 1948. In 1943, he opened an insurance office in Maniwaki.

In 1936, Desjardins married Germaine Courchaine.

He was elected to the Quebec assembly in 1948 and was reelected in 1952, 1956 and 1960. Desjardins was defeated by Roy Fournier when he ran for reelection in 1962. he died in Maniwaki later that year at the age of 53.
