= Vorlage (ski hill) =

Coordinates: 45°38′45″N 75°56′04″W

Vorlage is a ski hill located at the village of Wakefield, within the municipality of La Pêche, Quebec, in the Gatineau Hills north of Ottawa, Ontario. It consists of 18 runs, 13 of which have night skiing. It was opened in 1941 and has a terrain park.

== See also ==
- List of ski areas and resorts in Canada
