= Michel Gratton (politician) =

Canadian engineer and politician (1939–2025)

Michel Gratton (February 1, 1939 – August 3, 2025) was a Canadian civil engineer and member of the National Assembly of Quebec.

== Life and career ==
The son of Aurèle Gratton and Germaine Trépanier, he was born in Hull, Quebec (now Gatineau, Quebec). Gratton received his primary schooling at Laverdure and Larocque schools in Hull and attended secondary school at the University of Ottawa. He continued his education at the University of Ottawa and McGill University, receiving a bachelor's degree in civil engineering. Gratton pursued post-graduate studies in natural gas technology at the Illinois Institute of Technology and in public relations and general management at the American Management Association in New York City.

From 1960 to 1962, Gratton worked for Consumer Gas in Toronto as assistant to the vice-president. From 1962 to 1964, he was director of distribution for Ottawa Gas and the Société gazifère de Hull. From 1964 to 1967, he was assistant to the president of J.G. Bisson Construction in Hull. From 1967 to 1970, he was director general and then secretary-treasurer for Distribuco. Gratton was also president of the Hull Chamber of Commerce in 1971 and 1972.

In 1970, he was founding president for the Liberal Association in the Gatineau riding; he was regional president for the Quebec Liberal Party in 1971 and 1972. In 1970, Gratton ran unsuccessfully for the position of mayor of Hull. He was elected to the Quebec assembly for the Gatineau electoral district in a 1972 by-election and was reelected in 1973, 1976, 1981 and 1985. From October 1982 to March 1984, he was deputy leader of the official opposition in the assembly; he was leader of the official opposition from March 1984 to June 1985. From December 1985 to August 1989, he was Government House Leader for the assembly. Gratton served in the Quebec cabinet as Minister of Revenue from December 1985 to June 1987 and as Minister of Tourism from June 1987 to October 1989; he was Minister responsible for Electoral Reform from December 1985 to October 1989. He did not run for reelection in 1989.

After leaving politics, he served as director general and then president for the Asbestos Institute.

Gratton died on August 3, 2025, at the age of 86.
