= Camp Fortune =

Ski resort in Québec, Canada

Coordinates: 45.5090°N 75.8510°W

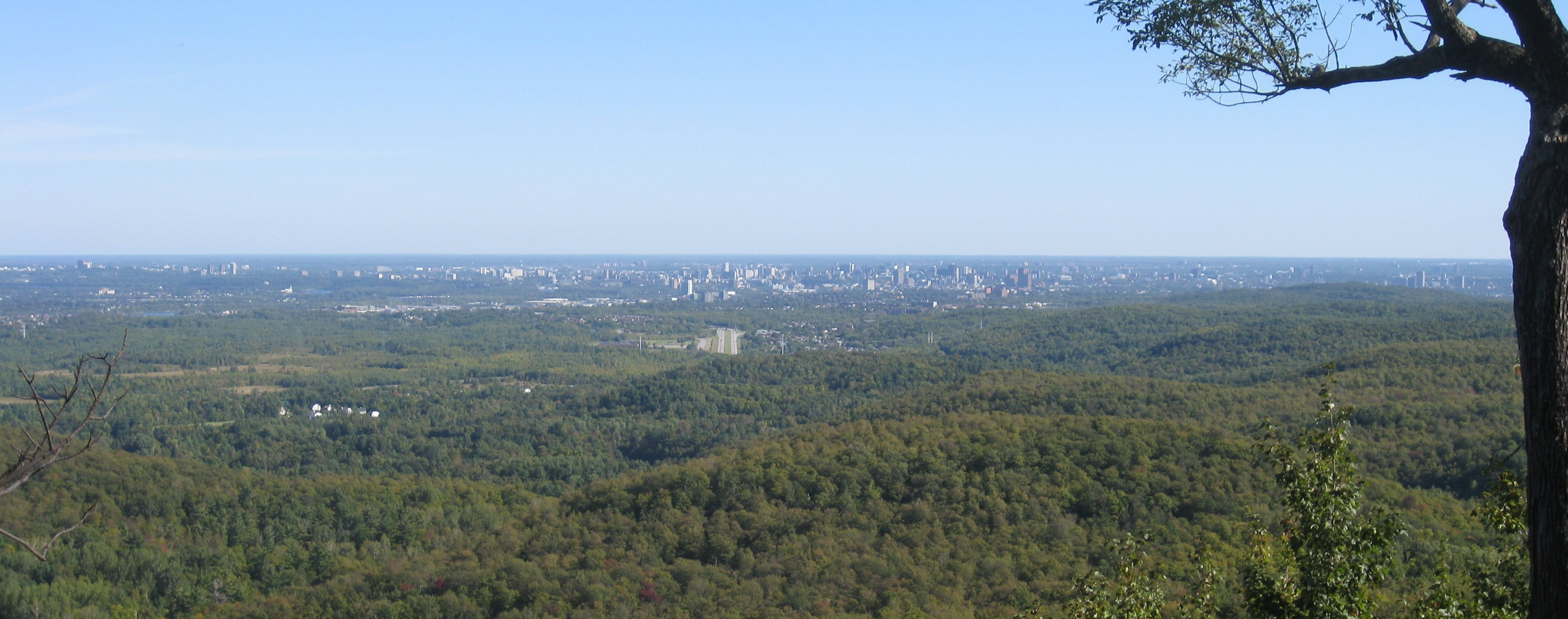
- View from the station.
- Interactive map of Camp Fortune
- Location: Chelsea, Quebec, Canada
- Nearest city: Gatineau, Quebec
- Vertical: 180 m (590 ft)
- Top elevation: 360 m (1,180 ft)
- Skiable area: 38 ha (93.9 acres)
- Trails: 20
- Lift system: 3 surface lifts 4 quad chair 1 triple chair
- Snowfall: up to 152 cm (60 in)
- Website: https://campfortune.com/en/

Camp Fortune is a commercial alpine ski centre located in the municipality of Chelsea in the Gatineau Hills north of Gatineau, Quebec, approximately fifteen minutes from Downtown Ottawa, Ontario.

Camp Fortune is composed of three mountainsides, including the Valley, Meech, and Skyline. Pineault, Clifford and Alexander are jointly referred to as The Valley and are considered to host the easier slopes of the ski centre. Meech offers intermediate terrain, and Skyline offers advanced terrain.

During the summer, Camp Fortune operates an aerial park with zip lines and offers downhill and cross country mountain biking in addition to a disc golf course. In addition, the ski lodge is available for rent as a banquet venue.

Ryan Tower was a 228.9-metre (751 ft) tall guyed mast that was built in the 1960s, located at the summit of the Clifford slope. A shorter tower of 38 metres (125 ft) dating from 1961 was the original antenna support structure for the radio station CFMO-FM. It was taken down on Sunday, November 4, 2012, and its functions were transferred to a new, nearby replacement tower.

Camp Fortune Ski Club operates at the hill, providing competitive and 'house' ski racing programmes for children and young adults aged 5 to 18 based on the Nancy Greene and Snowstars approaches.

For the 2021 summer season, Camp Fortune introduced an alpine pipe coaster, accessible from the Valley chairlift that runs from the top of the Clifford slope back to the bottom of the hill. The pipe coaster is approximately 1 kilometer long and riders can reach max speeds of 40 kilometers per hour.

In the 2022 summer season, Camp Fortune introduced a peak to peak Zipline experience which features a 3 zipline course that spans 4,478 feet between the Clifford and Alexander slopes and includes an optional 50-foot free fall jump attraction.

== Stats ==
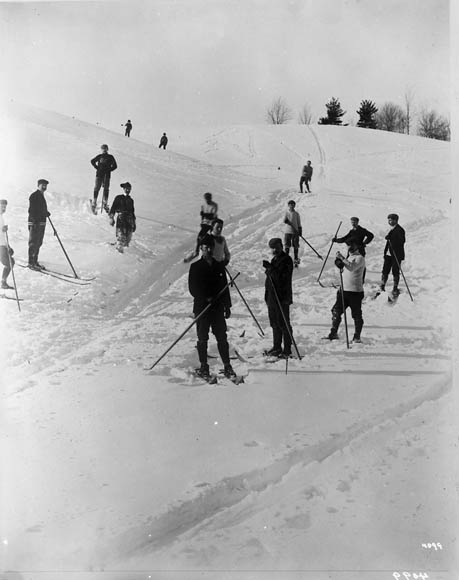
Skiing up in Gatineau, Quebec.

Vertical

- Skyline: 180m (590')
- Valley: 110m (360')
- Meech: 156m (512')

Number of runs/trails: 25

Total Number of lifts: 8

- 4 Fixed-Grip Quadruple Chairs
- 1 Fixed-Grip Triple Quad
- 2 Magic Carpets(Surface Lift)
- 1 T-Bar(Surface Lift)

Snowpark: Yes

== See also ==
- Mont Ste. Marie
- Mount Pakenham
- Calabogie Peaks
- List of ski areas and resorts in Canada
- Tallest structures in Canada
- List of masts
