= Georges-Adélard Auger =

Canadian politician

Georges-Adélard Auger (August 11, 1893 – May 2, 1981) was a Canadian barber and politician in Quebec. He represented Gatineau in the Legislative Assembly of Quebec from 1936 to 1939 as a Union Nationale member.

The son of Édouard Auger, a farmer, and Délima Rondeau, he was born in Maniwaki and was educated there. Auger served as school commissioner and as chair of the Maniwaki school board.

Auger ran unsuccessfully as an Action libérale nationale candidate for the Gatineau seat in 1935. He was elected in 1936 but was defeated when he ran for reelection in 1939 and again in 1944.

In 1922, he married Laurenza Lafrenièrre.

He died in Ottawa at the age of 87 and was buried in Hull.
