= David Florida =

Canadian pioneer in space research

Dr. C. David Florida (15 July 1913-19 January 1971) was a Canadian pioneer in space research. He was director of the Canadian National Space Telecommunications Laboratory and manager of the International Satellites for Ionospheric Studies (ISIS) programme. He was the first manager of the Hermes Communications Technology Satellite (CTS) programme just prior to his death in 1971.

The Satellite Assembly and Test Facility was renamed the David Florida Laboratory in his honor.

== Personal life ==
Florida was born in Bristol, England. He had a wife and two children.
