= Lac-Sainte-Marie, Quebec =

Lac-Sainte-Marie
- Municipality
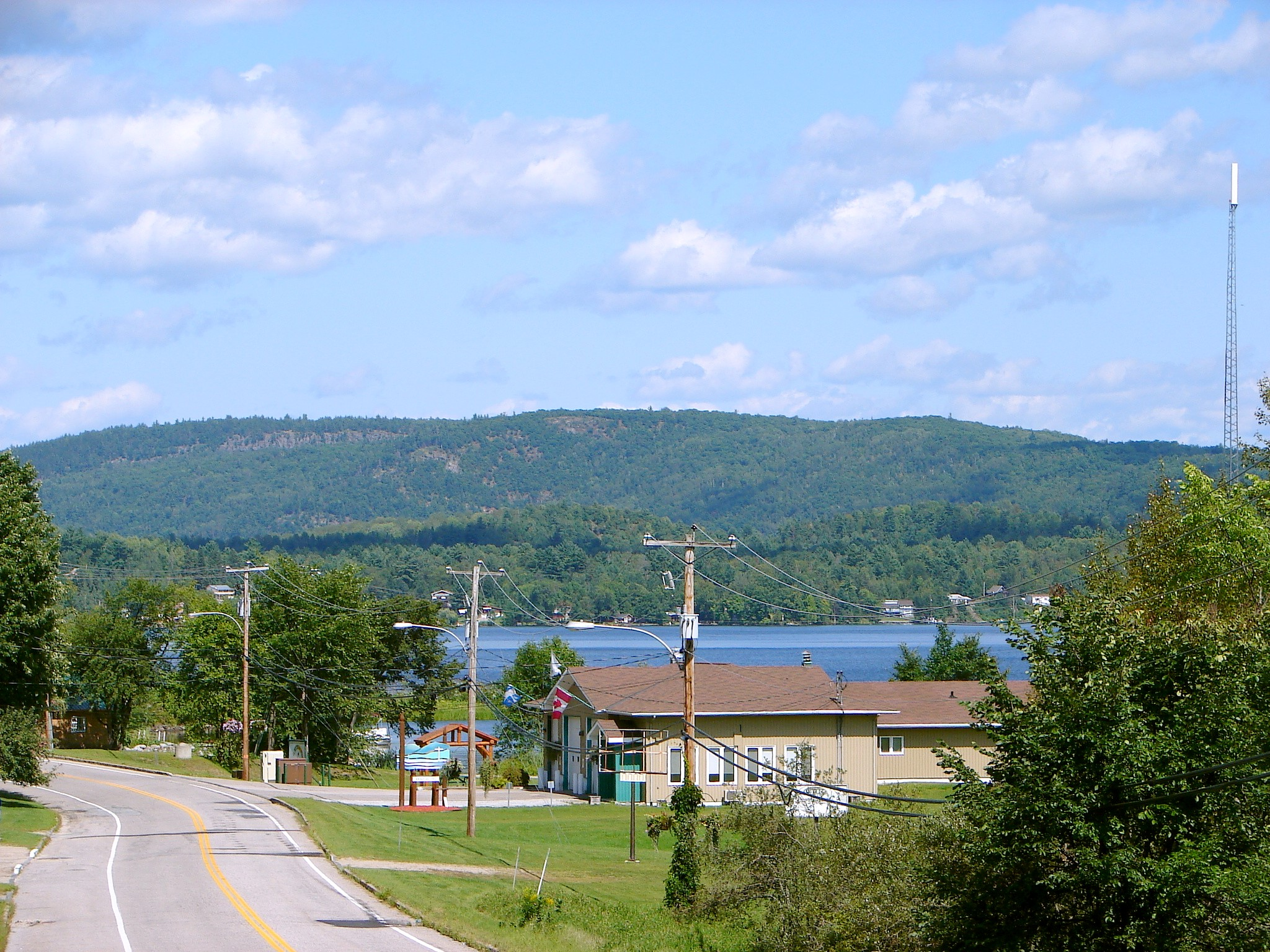
- municipal office and Sainte-Marie Lake

- Location in western Quebec
- Coordinates: 45°57′N 75°57′W
- Country: Canada
- Province: Quebec
- Region: Outaouais
- RCM: La Vallée-de-la-Gatineau
- Settled: 1840s
- Constituted: January 1, 1872

Government
  - Mayor: Cheryl Sage Christensen
  - Federal riding: Pontiac—Kitigan Zibi
  - Prov. riding: Gatineau

Area
  - Total: 240.15 km^{2} (92.72 sq mi)
  - Land: 205.71 km^{2} (79.43 sq mi)

Population (2021)
  - Total: 677
  - Density: 3.3/km^{2} (8.5/sq mi)
  - Pop (2016–21): ▲19.6%
  - Dwellings: 930
- Time zone: UTC−5 (EST)
  - Summer (DST): UTC−4 (EDT)
- Postal code(s): J0X 1Z0
- Area code: 819
- Website: www.lac-sainte-marie.com

Lac-Sainte-Marie (French pronunciation: [lak sɛ̃t maʁi]) is a municipality in the La Vallée-de-la-Gatineau Regional County Municipality, Quebec, Canada, 60 kilometres (37 mi) north of Gatineau. It is named after the adjacent lake.

== History ==
In 1840, the area was opened to settlement, and that same year the Saint-Nom-de-Marie Parish was founded. The municipality was formed in 1872. It was originally called Hincks, in honour of politician Sir Francis Hincks (1807-1885), who was then finance minister in the Macdonald cabinet. After this cabinet fell in 1873, Hincks’ name was replaced in popular usage by the name of the parish, and then by the name of the lake. In 1882, the post office opened, using the English name Lake St. Mary and renamed to Lac-Sainte-Marie in 1916.

In 1928 the village was flooded to create the Paugan hydroelectric dam. Ninety percent of the village had to be relocated to higher ground, including the church (St-Nom-de-Marie parish) located in the centre of the old town.

St-Nom-de-Marie parish was built in 1904-1905 and then moved to its actual site because of the Paugan dam construction, completed in 1929. Religious presence, however, dates back to 1840, the year the first chapel was built.

The submerged town attracted the attention of many tourists from the cities of Ottawa and Gatineau, and in 1975, Lac-Sainte-Marie became the official name, which paid tribute to a forgotten pioneer, Marie Léveillée, mother of Jean-Marie Léveillée who was the first settler in the area.

== Demographics ==
Historical census populations – Lac-Sainte-Marie, Quebec

Year	Pop.	±%
1976	363	—
1981	432	+19.0%
1986	521	+20.6%
1991	462	−11.3%
1996	492	+6.5%

Year	Pop.	±%
2001	488	−0.8%
2006	647	+32.6%
2011	611	−5.6%
2016	566	−7.4%
2021	677	+19.6%

Source: Statistics Canada

Private dwellings occupied by usual residents (2021): 374 (out of 930 total)

Mother tongue languages (2021):

- French as first language: 74%
- English as first language: 22%
- English and French as first language: 2%

== See also ==
- List of anglophone communities in Quebec
