= Radarsat-2 =

Canadian earth observation satellite

RADARSAT-2
- Mission type: Radar imaging
- Operator: MacDonald, Dettwiler and Associates
- COSPAR ID: 2007-061A
- SATCAT no.: 32382
- Website: MDA; CSA
- Mission duration: Elasped: 18 years, 5 months, 29 days

Spacecraft properties
- Bus: Prima
- Manufacturer: MDA; Alenia Aerospazio
- Launch mass: 2,300 kg (5,100 lb)

Start of mission
- Launch date: 14 December 2007, 13:17:34 UTC
- Rocket: Soyuz-FG/Fregat
- Launch site: Baikonur 31/6
- Contractor: Starsem

Orbital parameters
- Reference system: Geocentric
- Regime: Sun-synchronous

RADARSAT-2 is a Canadian Space Agency (CSA) Earth observation satellite. It launched on 14 December 2007 aboard a Starsem Soyuz-FG rocket from Baikonur Cosmodrome, Kazakhstan. The spacecraft is owned by MDA (formerly MacDonald Dettwiler and Associates.)

== Description ==
RADARSAT-2 uses C-band synthetic-aperture radar (SAR). Data may be acquired in any combination of horizontal and vertical polarizations (HH, HV, VV, VH). Resolution and swath width depends on the operation mode; the resolution range is 1 to 100 metres, and the swath width ranges from 18 to 500 kilometres.

The satellite allows for routine left- and right-looking operations, permitting faster revisit times and routine Antarctic mapping.

The payload module was built by EMS Technologies, with the phased array SAR antenna being built by EMS Montreal. The spacecraft bus was built by Alenia Aerospazio (Italy). The Extensible Support Structure was built by Able Engineering (United States).

== Development ==
In June 1994, the Government of Canada approved the Long-Term Space Plan II, which authorized the CSA to develop a follow-on to RADARSAT-1. MDA was selected as the primary contractor. The Canada Centre for Remote Sensing (CCRS) would receive and archive the satellite's data. The launch was expected to occur around 2001.

The CSA intended to launch RADARSAT-2 with National Aeronautics and Space Administration (NASA), in exchange for data sharing. In 1998, NASA declined when it was announced that the spacecraft would be privatized, being owned and operated by MDA. In 1999, the CSA began exploring Russian and European Space Agency (ESA) launch options. Boeing was selected in 2003 to provide a commercial launch on a Delta II., and finally Starsem in 2005. The search for launch options delayed the program and initially added costs, although the Starsem option ultimately reduced project costs.

Further difficulties and delays arose with the bus subsystem. Originally, the prospective contractor was Orbital Sciences Corporation (OSC) of the United States. A US Technical Assistance Agreement (TAA) was only provided in August 1999; restrictions imposed by US export controls made the TAA unacceptable to the CSA and Government of Canada. Ultimately, Alenia Aerospazio of Italy was selected to build the bus, with additional costs accruing from terminating the OSC contract. An ESA launch seemed likely when Alenia Aerospazio was selected.

The difficulties with the US may have been partially caused by the American perception that the sophisticated Canadian-controlled RADARSAT-2 was a threat to US security. The US intelligence agencies opposed the Boeing launch on national security grounds.

The subsystems arrived at the David Florida Laboratory (DFL) from 2003 to 2005 for assembly, integration and testing. Work at DFL and CSA preparations at Saint-Hubert, Quebec, were completed in September 2007. RADARSAT-2 arrived at Baikonur Cosmodrome by air on 15 November 2007 and launched on 14 December 2007.

== Mission ==
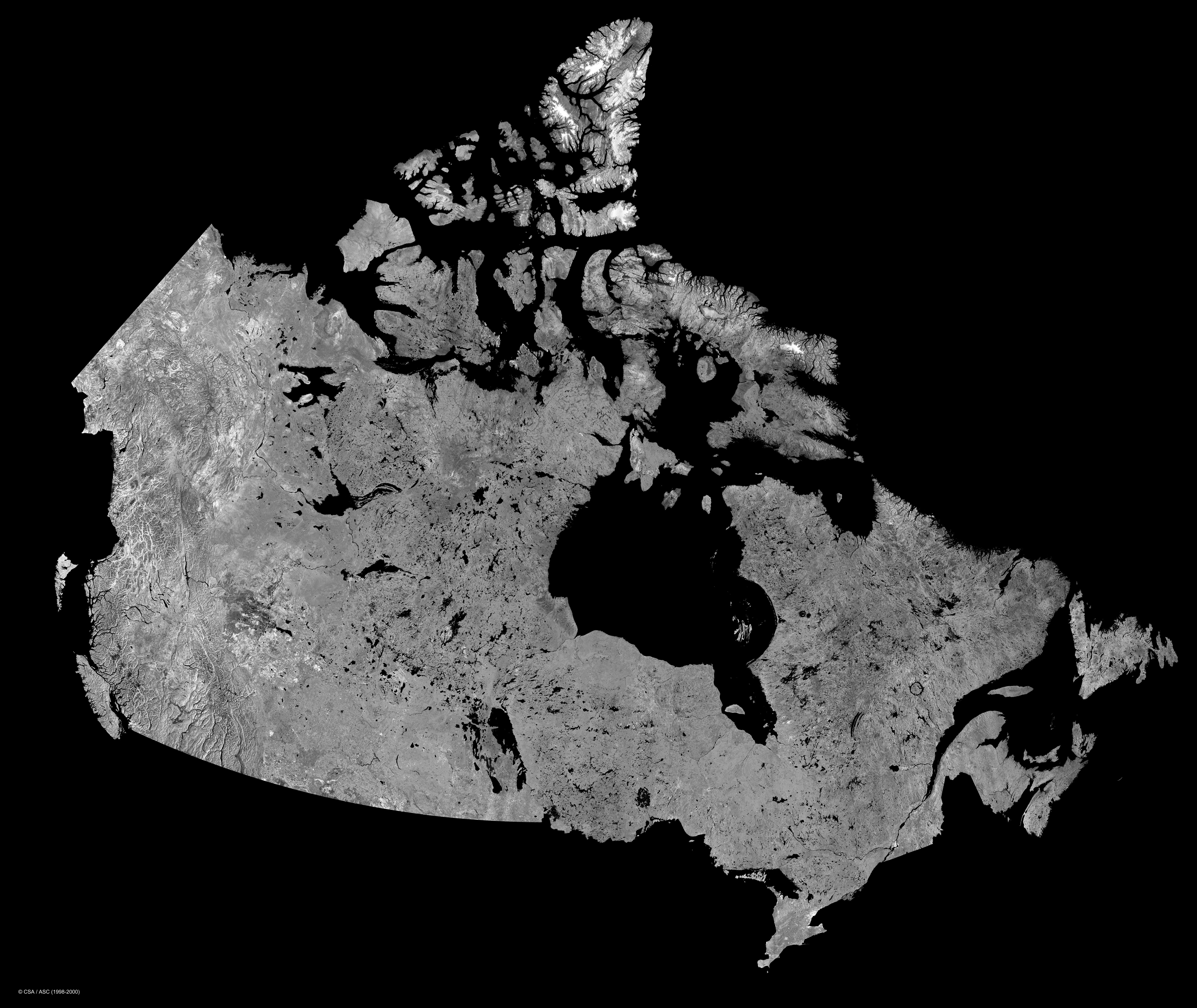
Canada

The end of the spacecraft and ground segment commissioning period was declared on April 27, 2008, after which routine commercial operation started.

It has the same orbit (798 km altitude Sun-synchronous orbit with 6 p.m. ascending node and 6 a.m. descending node). Some of the orbit characteristics are 24 days repeat cycle (=343 orbits), 14.29 orbits per day, each orbit being 100.75 minutes duration. It is fulfilling a wide variety of application, including sea ice mapping and ship routing, iceberg detection, agricultural crop monitoring, marine surveillance for ship and pollution detection, terrestrial defence surveillance and target identification, geological mapping, mine monitoring, land use mapping, wetlands mapping, and topographic mapping.

On 4 July 2009, Canada's Department of National Defence announced its intention to increase RADARSAT-2 usage for surveillance of Canada's coastlines and the Arctic. To carry out this new project, the satellite's owner MDA was awarded a $25-million contract to carry out upgrades (called project Polar Epsilon) to enhance the satellite's capabilities to detect surface ships. The upgrades consisted of creating new beam modes (OSVN and DVWF) that target improvements in maritime vessel detection over a broad area, as well as upgrading the RADARSAT-2 ground segment to improve conflict resolution with other government users. Two new ground stations for data reception have been built, one on the east coast at Masstown, N.S., and the other at Aldergrove, B.C. (west coast). These two new stations are mainly used for the Polar Epsilon project.

By mid-August 2015, the addition of the Canada Centre for Mapping and Earth Observation (CCMEO, formerly CCRS) X Band receiving station in Inuvik significantly increased RADARSAT-2's downlink capacity in Canada. The network of ground receiving stations continues to expand with 19 partner organizations using 53 antennas at various reception sites (as of June 2020).

As of 2025, RADARSAT-2 has been in service for more than 17 years. Numerous enhancements have been added to the original capabilities both on the ground and on the space segments. The operational performance is well within the specification with an acquisition success rate above 97% (Acquisition successfully executed vs Acquisition loaded on the Spacecraft for execution) and a percentage of availability of 99.95% (hours of outage vs total hours in a year). The usage of SAR data have been steadily growing from an average of 3.5 minutes per orbit in 2008 to an average of 11.57 minutes per orbit in 2019. On July 15, 2020, MDA provided the full extent of the original Government of Canada data allocation in exchange for the government's financial contribution to the building of the satellite. The Government of Canada remains an important user of RADARSAT-2 data.

== See also ==
- RADARSAT Constellation
