= RADARSAT Constellation =

Canadian satellite fleet

- Mission type: Earth observation satellites
- Operator: Canadian Space Agency
- Website: asc-csa.gc.ca/eng/satellites/radarsat/default.asp
- Mission duration: 7 years (each satellite)

Spacecraft properties
- Bus: Canadian SmallSat Bus
- Manufacturer: MDA
- Launch mass: 4,200 kg (total mass of the 3 satellites)

Start of mission
- Launch date: 12 June 2019
- Rocket: Falcon 9 Block 5 B1051-2
- Contractor: SpaceX

Orbital parameters
- Reference system: Geocentric
- Regime: Sun-synchronous orbit
- Altitude: 600 km
- Inclination: 97.74°
- Period: 96.4 min

Transponders
- Band: C band
- Frequency: 5.405 GHz
- Bandwidth: 100 MHz

The RADARSAT Constellation Mission (RCM) is a three-spacecraft fleet of Earth observation satellites operated by the Canadian Space Agency. The RCM's goal is to provide data for climate research and commercial applications including oil exploration, fishing, shipping, etc. With satellites smaller than RADARSAT-2, the RCM will provide new applications—made possible through the constellation approach—as well as continuing to provide C-band radar data to RADARSAT-2 users. One of its most significant improvements is in its operational use of synthetic-aperture radar (SAR) data. The primary goal of RCM is to provide continuous C-band SAR data to RADARSAT-2 users, as SAR imagery at a high temporal resolution is required by several users in the Canadian government. Other improvements include more frequent area coverage of Canada and reduced risk of a service interruption. The RCM will provide the world's most advanced, comprehensive method of maintaining Arctic sovereignty, conducting coastal surveillance, and ensuring maritime security.

The three satellites were launched on 12 June 2019 at 14:17 UTC on board a Falcon 9 rocket. Originally booster B1050 was planned to be used for this mission. However, after the failed landing of B1050, B1051 was used in this mission.

== Overview ==
Working alongside industry partners, the Canadian Space Agency (CSA) is in charge of mission planning and operations from their headquarters in Saint-Hubert, Quebec. The project was accepted given these three objectives would be met: deliver C-band data to users within the Canadian government, produce daily coverage for ice, ship, and oil spill detection, and meet financial constraints to minimize cost of the program. The Canadian Government will own the satellites and data and will be responsible for its dissemination. Several requirements were established for the RCM by the Canadian government. RCM is required to be able to access 95% of any point on the globe on an average day. It is also required to have a multi-polarization function to increase flexibility in its function, as well as be able to capture subsidence in terrain using Phase Preserving ScanSAR Processing. The RADARSAT Constellation Mission (RCM) includes three identical Earth observation satellites. The prime contractor on the project is MDA and it was designed for three main uses:

- Maritime surveillance (ice, surface wind, oil pollution and ship monitoring)
- Disaster management (mitigation, warning, response and recovery)
- Ecosystem monitoring (agriculture, wetlands, forestry and coastal change monitoring)

RADARSAT collects data mainly from the land surface of Canada and the oceans around the country. Its synthetic aperture radars (SAR) have a mass of 400 kg each, and a resolution of 1 × 3 m. As secondary payload, it includes Automatic Identification System for ships (AIS).

== See also ==
- RADARSAT
- Technological and industrial history of Canada
