= MDA Space =

Canadian space technology company

MDA Space Ltd.
- Type: Public
- Traded as: TSX: MDA
- Industry: Aerospace
- Predecessor: Maxar Technologies; MacDonald, Dettwiler and Associates; Spar Aerospace
- Founded: 1969; 57 years ago in Vancouver, Canada
- Founders: John S. MacDonald; Vern Dettwiler
- Headquarters: Brampton, Ontario, Canada
- Key people: Mike Greenley, CEO; Guillaume Lavoie, CFO; Cameron Ower, CTO; Stephanie McDonald, Chief People, Culture and Transformation Officer; Dr. Minda Suchan, VP, Geointelligence; Holly Johnson, VP, Robotics and Space Operations; Luigi Pozzebon, VP, Satellite Systems
- Products: Geointelligence, robotics, space operations, and satellite systems
- Revenue: 1.201 billion $ US (2025)
- Operating income: 409.7 millions $ US (2025)
- Net income: 108.5 millions $ US (2025)
- Number of employees: 3,802 employees (2025)
- Parent: Northern Private Capital; Maxar Technologies
- Website: mda.space

MDA Space Ltd. is a Canadian space technology company headquartered in Brampton, Ontario, Canada, that provides geointelligence, robotics, space operations, and satellite systems.

MDA Space UK at 9th Bengaluru Space Expo 2026, BIEC

== History ==
John S. MacDonald and Vern Dettwiler founded MacDonald, Dettwiler and Associates in the basement of MacDonald's Vancouver home in 1969. On 17 November 1995, the company became a subsidiary of Orbital Sciences Corporation (OSC), a U.S.-based company.

MDA was the primary contractor for, and took ownership of, the RADARSAT-2 Earth observation satellite.

In March 1999, MDA bought the space robotics division of Spar Aerospace, manufacturer of the Canadarm, and renamed it MD Robotics. The company completed the Mobile Servicing System (including the Canadarm2) for the International Space Station. OSC sold its entire stake in 2001. Nearly 70% was sold to a group of Canadian investors; the Ontario Teachers' Pension Plan (OTPP) became the largest shareholder with a 29% stake.

In the 2000s, MDA experienced difficulties winning government contracts in the United States due to its foreign ownership. In 2008, an attempt to sell the space division to Alliant Techsystems was blocked by the Canadian government on national security grounds. The subsequent lack of Canadian business led to layoffs. The real estate information business was sold in early 2011, with MDA buying Space Systems/Loral from Loral Space & Communications in 2012, resulting in OTPP reducing its stake to less than 10%.

MDA purchased DigitalGlobe and rebranded as Maxar Technologies in 2017, the company moved its headquarters to Colorado, United States.

On 8 April 2020, Toronto-based investment firm Northern Private Capital bought the MDA assets from Maxar for CA$1 billion (US$765 million). and named the new company MDA Ltd., while establishing its headquarters in Canada.

On 9 December 2020, the Canadian Space Agency (CSA) awarded MDA a contract to develop and construct the Canadarm3 as part of Canada's contribution to the NASA-led Lunar Gateway Program. The contract is for the first phase of the program, worth C$22.8 million, with options for follow-on phases. The contract was further confirmed on 16 December 2020, when NASA and the CSA announced the finalised agreement to collaborate on the Gateway, which included the robotic arm system Canadarm3, the installation of two scientific instruments, and a commitment to provide two crew positions for Canadian astronauts.

On 7 April 2021, MDA became a publicly traded company on the Toronto Stock Exchange trading under the symbol MDA.

On 16 August 2023, Telesat announced it had chosen MDA to build 198 small satellites for the Telesat Lightspeed Low Earth Orbit (LEO) program. The project will utilize MDA's digital beamforming array antennas and integrated regenerative processor. The Lightspeed satellite is slightly smaller than the previously considered one. Antenna will be designed and manufactured in Ste-Anne-de-Bellevue, Quebec.

On 7 March 2024, MDA announced it had rebranded to MDA Space.

== Facilities ==
=== Canada ===
- Brampton, ON (HQ)
- Kanata, ON
- Ottawa, ON
- Cantley, QC
- Montreal, QC
- Richmond, BC
- Halifax, NS

=== International offices ===
- Didcot, United Kingdom
- Stevenage, United Kingdom
- Manchester, United Kingdom
- Houston, TX, United States
