= Artturi =

Finnish male given name

- Gender: Male
- Language: Finnish

Origin
- Region of origin: Finland

Other names
- Nickname: Arttu
- Related names: Arthur, Artur, Arturo

Artturi is a Finnish masculine given name, a variant of the name Arthur. The short form of the name is Arttu. Notable people with the name include:

== Artturi ==
- Artturi Aalto (1876–1937), Finnish politician and journalist
- Artturi Hiidenheimo (1877–1956), Finnish farmer and politician
- Artturi Jämsén (1925–1976), Finnish politician
- Artturi Järviluoma (1879–1942), Finnish journalist, screenwriter and author
- Artturi Koskinen (1904–1981), Finnish farmer and politician
- Artturi Laitinen (1882–1959), Finnish schoolteacher and politician
- Artturi Lehkonen (born 1995), Finnish professional ice hockey player
- Artturi Lehtinen (1896–1966), Finnish diplomat
- Artturi Leinonen (1888–1963), Finnish journalist and politician
- Artturi Niemelä (1923–2021), Finnish politician
- Artturi Nyyssönen (1892–1973), Finnish footballer
- Artturi Tienari (1907–1998), Finnish politician
- Lasse Artturi Virén (born 1949), Finnish long-distance runner, four-time Olympic champion
- Artturi H. Virkkunen (1864–1924), Finnish historian, journalist and politician
- Artturi Ilmari Virtanen (1895–1973), Finnish chemist
- Artturi Vuorimaa (1890–1972), Finnish Lapua movement activist

== Arttu ==
- Arttu Aromaa (born 1995), Finnish football player and manager
- Arttu Auranen (born 1999), Finnish footballer
- Arttu Heinonen (born 1999), Finnish footballer
- Arttu Hoskonen (born 1997), Finnish footballer
- Arttu Hyry (born 2001), Finnish ice hockey player
- Arttu Ilomäki (born 1991), Finnish ice hockey player
- Arttu Kangas (born 1993), Finnish shot putter
- Arttu Kiramo (born 1990), Finnish freestyle skier
- Arttu Lappi (born 1984), Finnish ski jumper
- Arttu Likola (born 1994), Finnish ice hockey player
- Arttu Lötjönen (born 2004), Finnish footballer
- Arttu Luttinen (born 1983), Finnish ice hockey player
- Arttu Mäkiaho (born 1997), Finnish Nordic combined skier
- Arttu Niskakangas (born 1988), Finnish-Norwegian ice hockey player
- Arttu Pelli (born 1996), Finnish ice hockey player
- Arttu Ruotsalainen (born 1997), Finnish ice hockey player
- Arttu Seppälä (born 1987), Finnish football player
- Arttu Sivonen (born 2005), Finnish footballer
- Arttu Tulehmo (born 2007), Finnish footballer
- Arttu Wiskari (born 1984), Finnish singer-songwriter
