= Felix Carrasco =

Mexican-Austrian conductor

- Born: Félix Carrasco–Córdova; July 29, 1955 (age 70)
- Occupation: Conductor
- Website: www.felixcarrasco.com

Félix Carrasco-Córdova (born July 29, 1955) is a Mexican-Austrian conductor. He has performed successfully near a hundred different orchestras around the world and has gained international recognition for his extraordinary performances. His sensitivity and accurate interpretation of the score has impressed audiences. Some characteristics that critics have applauded are for sound, pitch and rapid response from the musicians.

== Education ==
He studied Piano, Oboe, and Conducting in the National Conservatory of Music of Mexico until he received an opportunity to attend Vienna's famous Hochschule für Musik (University of Music and Performing Arts, Vienna) which he later received a full scholarship by the Austrian government for his successful studies. He studied with Karl Österreicher (conducting), Thomas Christian David (composition), Harald Goertz (opera conducting), and Guenther Theuring (choral conducting). He finished his studies and graduated in 1982 with Honors.

== Conducting career ==
Throughout his career, Felix Carrasco has been the artistic director of several Austrian and Mexican orchestras.

=== 1982–1990 ===
The First Austrian Women's Chamber Orchestra (1982–1983), The Pro-Arte Orchestra in Vienna (1983–1985), The Querétaro Chamber Orchestra (1986–1988), and The Orchestra of the Manuel M. Ponce Cultural Society (1987). Additionally, he was Second Conductor of the Mexico City Philharmonic Orchestra from 1986 to 1990 under principal conductor Enrique Bátiz.

=== 1991–2009 ===
From 1991 to 2009 he was the artistic director and Principal Conductor of the Monterrey UANL Symphony Orchestra. He transformed the Monterrey UANL Symphony Orchestra in one of the most prestigious orchestras in Mexico, considered by many guest artists to be worthy of international standards.

In 1997 he founded the Monterrey Chamber Orchestra.

Carrasco conducted more than forty concerts a year with the Monterrey UANL Symphony Orchestra, where he spent 19 years. He delighted and pleased his audiences with a vast repertoire of Baroque music, Classical period (music), Romantic music, and 20th-century classical music. His concerts included a vast repertoire of Chamber music, Symphony music, Opera and Oratorio. The city of Monterrey and its thousands of audience members were honored with the many premieres of classical masterpieces he offered.

Carrasco shared the stage with important soloists and singers such as: Lucia Aliberti, Mario Hossen, Antal Szalai, Jörg Demus, Carlos Prieto (cellist), Eva Maria Zuk, Otto Sauter, Joan Kwuon, Michael Werba, Carlos Bonell, Vadim Brodski, just to name a few.

He has been a passionate motivator, supporter and promoter of Mexican composers such as: Paulino Paredes Pérez, Silvino Jaramillo, Arturo Rodriguez, and Felipe Ledesma, amongst the few. In which he globally premiered many of their pieces.

In 2000 he formed The Pops season called "Conciertos en Mangas de Camisa", that played popular music (generally traditional pop) and show tunes as well as well-known classical works. Some of its music included: Movie themes, Eugenia Leon, The Symphonic Beatles with Vadim Brodski, Symphonic Rock Music, Symphonic Queen with Carlos Bonell, Glenn Miller, Agustín Lara, Perez Prado, Betsy Pecanins, Raúl di Blasio, Mariachi Vargas de Tecalitlán

=== Guest Conductor ===
Among the countries whose main orchestras he has guest conducted are:

Europe: Germany, Austria, Switzerland, Spain, Greece, Hungary, Italy, Latvia, Lithuania, Macedonia, Poland, Portugal, and The Czech Republic.

Africa and Asia: China, Cyprus, Egypt, Kazakhstan, Turkey and Taiwan.

Americas: Canada, Colombia, Cuba, the United States, Mexico, the Dominican Republic, and Venezuela.

Carrasco has also participated as a guest conductor for several international tours through Europe with the Hungarian National Philharmonic of Budapest, the Szeged Symphony Orchestra, both in Hungary, the Philharmonic Orchestra of Brasov, the Feminine Symphony of Austria, and the Chamber Orchestra of Tokyo.

For several years, Carrasco has been a permanent guest conductor to the Zurich Symphony Orchestra, the Polish Baltic Philharmonic, the Orquestra do Norte in Portugal, the Cairo Symphony Orchestra, and the Orquesta Sinfónica del Estado de México.

== Professor ==
As a professor, he has taught orchestral conducting in three of the most important Mexican Universities: The Universidad Autónoma de Nuevo León, The Autonomous University of Coahuila, and The National Autonomous University of Mexico.

== Accomplishments and awards ==
Transforming the Monterrey UANL Symphony Orchestra in one of the most prestigious orchestras in Mexico.

In 1995 The Universidad Autónoma de Nuevo León honored Carrasco with the Highest Arts Prize for his accomplishments with the Monterrey UANL Symphony Orchestra.

In 1997 the State of Nuevo León honored him with the Medal of Civic Achievement for his contribution to the cultural development of the State.

The Mexican government and the Austrian Embassy in Mexico awarded him with the Mozart's gold medal in 2002 Mozart Medal (Mexico), which has been granted only to the most distinguished figures of classical music in Mexico.

He was the first Mexican to perform within the walls of The Forbidden City in Beijing, China, with the Beijing Symphony Orchestra in 2005. His program included Mexican and international pieces.

== Recordings ==
From 2002, several albums were recorded with the Monterrey UANL Symphony Orchestra:

Compositores de Nuevo León (Nuevo León Composers) This compilation shows the talent of northeast Mexican composers (born or naturalized in this region), whose work was recently discovered and encouraged by Carrasco.

Compositores de Nuevo León Tríptico (Nuevo León Composers trilogy) The album contains 3 CD's. It as a compilation from the first Nuevo León Composers cd with more pieces from northeast Mexican composers.

Obras Maestras para Jóvenes (Classical masterpieces for children) Felix Carrasco is aware of the importance of early approach of classical music to children. This is why this project was entirely thought for them. Beautiful stories such as Peter and the Wolf (Prokofiev), Carnival of the Animals (Saint-Saëns), and The Young Person's Guide to the Orchestra (Britten) are included in this CD.

Obras de piano y orquesta (Piano and orchestra pieces) This romantic CD includes famous scores for piano and orchestra of the American composer George Gershwin and the Mexican talent Manuel M. Ponce.

Cañón Huasteca (Huasteca Canyon) The first album with works of Paulino Paredes. Paulino Paredes (1913–1957).

Muñecos de Barro (Clay Puppets) A second album with the works of Paulino Paredes, tuning to a more ballet style classical music. Paulino Paredes (1913–1957).
