= Arturo =

Arturo is a masculine given name. It is a Spanish and Italian variant of the name Arthur.

== People ==
- Arturo Alessandri (1868–1950), Chilean politician and president
- Arturo Álvarez (footballer, born 1985), American-born Salvadoran footballer
- Arturo Álvarez (footballer, born 1959), Mexican footballer
- Arturo Araujo (1878–1967), former president of El Salvador
- Arturo Elías Ayub (born 1966), Mexican businessman
- Arturo Barrios (born 1962), Mexican-American long-distance runner
- Arturo Basile (1914–1968), Italian conductor
- Arthuro Henrique Bernhardt (born 1982), Brazilian football (soccer) player
- Arturo Alessandri Besa (1923–2022), Chilean lawyer and politician
- Arturo Brachetti (born 1957), Italian quick-change artist
- Arturo Bragaglia (1893–1962), Italian actor
- Arturo Bravo (1958–2023), Mexican racewalker
- Arturo Cavero Calisto, Peruvian politician
- Arturo Casadevall (born 1957), American physician
- Arturo Castro (Mexican actor) (1918–1975), Mexican actor
- Arturo Castro (Guatemalan actor), Guatemalan actor
- Arturo "Zambo" Cavero (1940–2009), Afro-Peruvian singer
- Arturo Char Chaljub (born 1967), Colombian politician
- Arturo Corvalán (born 1978), Chilean road cyclist
- Arturo Cruz Jr. (born 1953), Nicaraguan Contra, diplomat and professor
- Arturo Chacón Cruz (born 1977), Mexican-American singer
- Arturo González Cruz (1954–2024), Mexican politician
- Arturo de Córdova (1908–1973), Mexican actor
- Arturo De Vecchi (1898–1988), Italian fencer
- Arturo Guzmán Decena (1976–2002), Mexican Army Special Forces officer and criminal
- Arturo Di Modica (1941–2021), Italian-born American artist
- Arturo Di Napoli (born 1974), Italian football coach
- Arturo Dominici (1918–1992), Italian actor and dubbing artist
- Arturo Rodríguez, multiple people
- Arturo Rodríguez Fernández (1948–2010), Dominican author, film critic, and playwright
- Arturo Freeman, American football player
- Arturo Frondizi (1908–1995), 35th President of Argentina
- Arturo García, multiple people
- Arturo Gatti (1972–2009), Italian-Canadian boxer
- Arturo Giovannitti (1884–1959), Italian-American union leader, socialist political activist, and poet
- Arturo Godoy (1912–1986), Chilean boxer
- Arturo Labriola (1873–1959), Italian revolutionary syndicalist, socialist politician, and journalist
- Arturo Longton, multiple people
- Arturo Márquez (born 1950), Mexican composer
- Arturo Martínez, multiple people
- Arturo Mercado (born 1940), Mexican voice actor
- Arturo Merzario (born 1943), Italian automobile racing driver
- Arturo Fernández Meyzán (1906–1999), Peruvian football defender
- Arturo Benedetti Michelangeli (1920–1995), Italian virtuoso pianist
- Arturo Michelena (1863–1898), Venezuelan painter
- Arturo Armando Molina (1927– 2021), Salvadoran former president of El Salvador
- Arturo Montiel (born 1943), Mexican politician
- Arturo O'Farrill (born 1960), Mexican musician, composer, and bandleader
- Arturo Ordoñez (born 1997), Spanish footballer
- Arturo Ortega (born 1976), professional Mexican footballer and manager
- Arturo Paoli (1912–2015), Italian priest and missionary
- Arturo Parisi (born 1940), Italian politician
- Arturo Peniche (born 1962), Mexican telenovela actor
- Arturo Pérez-Reverte (born 1951), Spanish writer
- Arturo Prat (1848–1879), Chilean lawyer and navy officer
- Arturo Reggio, Italian chess player
- Arturo Fernández Rodríguez (1929–2019), Spanish actor
- Arturo Rosenblueth (1900–1970), Mexican researcher, physician and physiologist
- Arturo Sampay (1911–1977), Argentine lawyer, constitutionalist and professor
- Arturo Sandoval, Cuban jazz musician
- Arturo Alfonso Schomburg (1874–1938), Puerto Rican historian, writer, and activist
- Arturo Sosa (born 1948), Venezuelan Catholic priest
- Arturo Tolentino (1910–2004), Filipino politician, lawyer and diplomat
- Arturo Torres, multiple people
- Arturo Toscanini (1867–1957), Italian composer and conductor
- Arturo Vázquez (born 1949), Mexican professional footballer
- Arturo Vidal (born 1987), Chilean football player
- Arturo Yamasaki (1929–2013), Peruvian-Mexican football referee

== Fictional characters ==
- Arturo Belano, an alter ego of the Chilean writer Roberto Bolaño
- Arturo Román from Spanish show Le Casa De Papel, also known as Money Heist

== Animals ==
- Arturo (polar bear), a polar bear who lived in an Argentinian zoo
