= Arturo Fernández =

Arturo Fernández may refer to:

- Arturo Fernández Rodríguez (1929–2019), Spanish actor
- Arturo Fernández (footballer) (1906–1999), Peruvian football defender
- Arturo Rodríguez Fernández (1948–2010), author, film critic, and playwright from the Dominican Republic
