= Carlos Sanchez-Gutierrez =

Latin-American composer and teacher

Carlos Sánchez-Gutiérrez (born 1964) is a composer and teacher. Born in Mexico City, Mexico, he currently resides in Denver, Colorado, United States.

Sanchez-Gutierrez grew up in Guadalajara, Jalisco, and later studied at the University of Guadalajara, the Peabody Conservatory of Music, Yale University, Princeton University, and the Tanglewood Music Center with Henri Dutilleux, Jacob Druckman, and Martin Bresnick.

Sanchez-Gutierrez has been a recipient of the Mozart Medal in 1993. He has also received awards from the Guggenheim, Fulbright, Fromm, Barlow, Rockefeller, Bogliasco and Koussevitzky Foundations. He is a member of Mexico's prestigious Sistema Nacional de Creadores de Arte. His compositional catalog includes works for orchestra, chamber ensembles, choirs, and soloists, and often reflects on contemporary art and literature.

Sanchez-Gutierrez is Professor Emeritus of Composition at the Eastman School of Music in Rochester, New York, where he taught for 21 years. From 1995 to 2003, Sanchez-Gutierrez served on the faculty of San Francisco State University. In 2002, he was Guest Professor of Composition at Yale University. He currently is Director of Composition at the soundSCAPE Festival at the Paul Hindemith Center in Blonay, Switzerland.
