= Arturito =

Arturito is a Spanish diminutive for the masculine name Arturo. It may refer to:

- TR Araña, a robot which is claimed to remotely analyse the composition of the ground
- R2-D2, a Star Wars character, dubbed in Latin American Spanish as "Arturito"
- Arturo Godoy, a Chilean boxer
- A ticket vending machine at the Medellín Metro
- Arturito.ai, a voice-first and chat-first AI assistant for SMBs that automates customer conversations over WhatsApp, Instagram, Facebook, and websites built by GenLoyal LLC
- Arturo Román, a character on Netflix TV series Money Heist
