= Francisco Araiza =

Mexican tenor (born 1950)

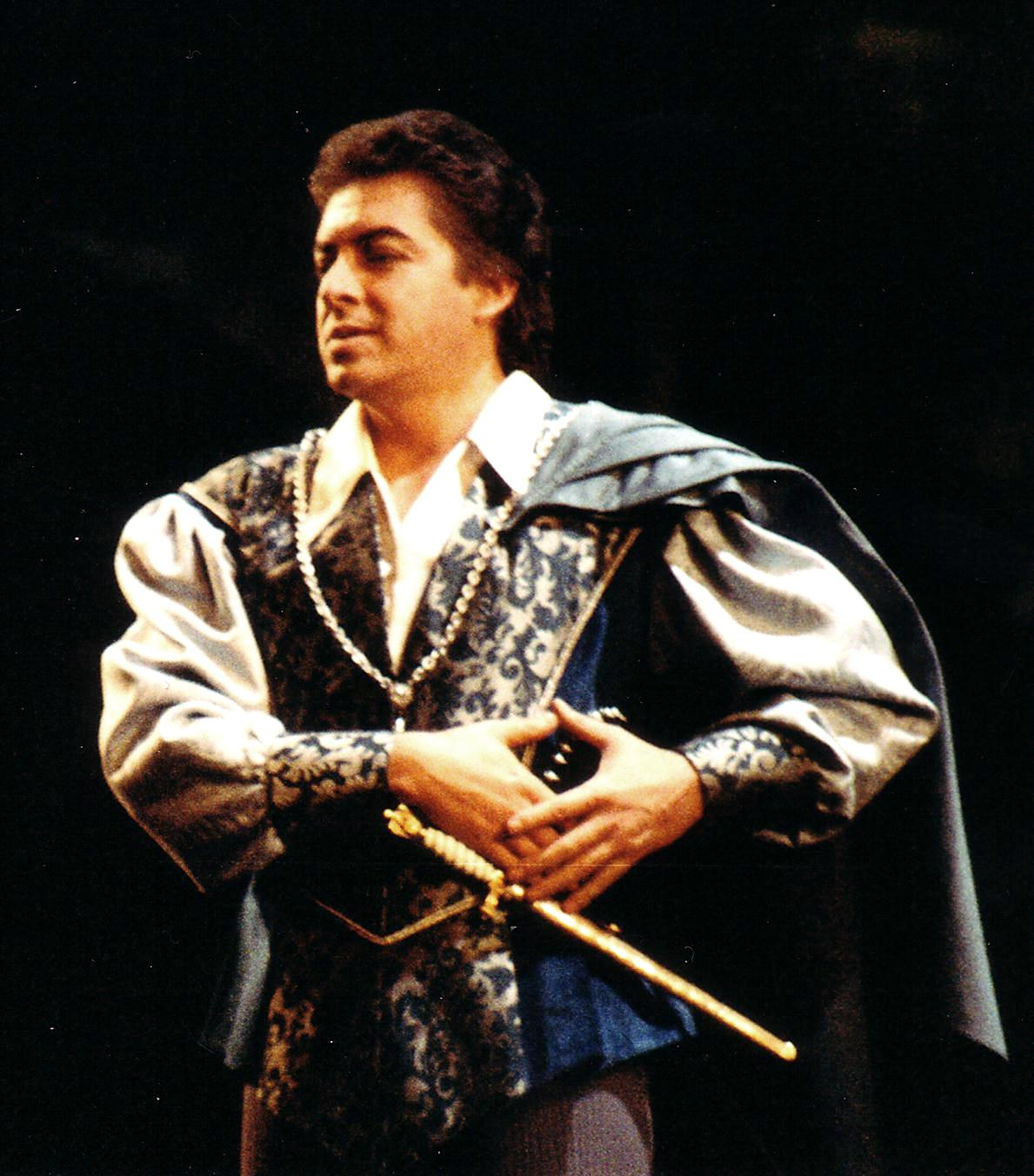
Francisco Araiza as Romeo in Roméo et Juliette, Zurich 1990

José Francisco Araiza Andrade (born 4 October 1950) is a Mexican operatic tenor and lied singer who has sung as soloist in leading concert halls and in leading tenor operatic roles in the major opera houses of Europe and North America during the course of a lengthy career. Born in Mexico City, he studied singing at the Conservatorio Nacional de Música de México and later in Germany, with Mozartian tenor Richard Holm, and lieder interpretation with Erik Werba. He made his operatic debut in 1970 in Mexico City as First Prisoner in Beethoven's Fidelio. Araiza initially came to international prominence singing in Mozart and Rossini operas, but in the 1980s broadened his repertoire to include Italian and French lyric tenor roles and Wagnerian roles such as Lohengrin and Walther von Stolzing. He was made a Kammersänger of the Vienna State Opera in 1988. Now retired from the opera stage, he teaches singing and serves on the juries of several international singing competitions.

== Early life and education ==
Francisco Araiza was born in Mexico City on 4 October 1950, the second of José Araiza and Guadalupe Andrade's seven children. His father, also a tenor, was a church organist and a chorus master for Mexico's national opera company, Compania Nacional de Opera de Bellas Artes. Araiza's father taught him to read music and play the piano when he was a child, but he did not begin to study music formally until he was 15 when he enrolled in organ and singing classes at the Escuela Nacional de Música. He continued his singing classes while studying business administration at the National Autonomous University of Mexico where he played quarterback on the football team and sang in the university choir. He was 18 when he made his professional debut in 1969 with a recital featuring Schumann's Dichterliebe. The soprano Irma González, a prominent voice teacher at the National Conservatory of Music of Mexico in Mexico City, was in the audience. At her suggestion Araiza enrolled full-time in the conservatory. She was to become his primary voice teacher for the next four years, although he also studied the German operatic and lieder repertory with Erika Kubacsek, a Viennese singing teacher living in Mexico City at the time.

== International opera career ==
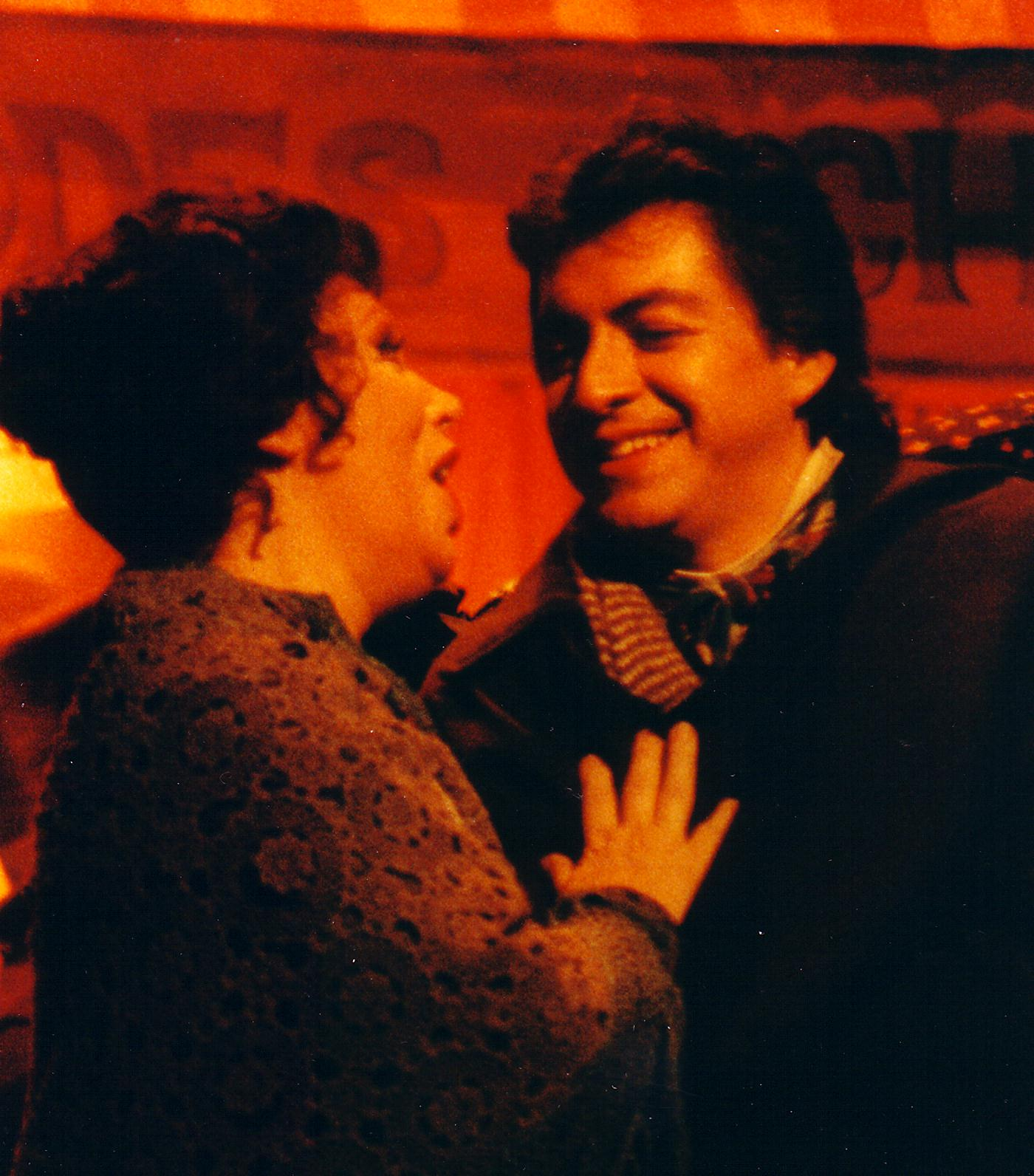
Francisco Araiza as Rodolfo

Araiza's operatic stage debut came in 1970 when he sang The First Prisoner in a concert performance of Beethoven's Fidelio by the Compania Nacional de Opera de Bellas Artes. A few months later he graduated to the role of Jacquino in the same opera and went on to sing Des Grieux in Massenet's Manon and Rodolfo in Puccini's La bohème with the company. In 1974 he went to Munich to compete in the ARD International Music Competition, where he received Third Prize. Although the pieces he sang for the competition were from the Italian lyric tenor repertoire, the judges told him that he would make an ideal Mozart tenor and offered him a contract with the Karlsruhe Opera. He decided to remain in Munich for further training with Richard Holm and Erik Werba before his debut at Karlsruhe in 1975 as Ferrando in Così fan tutte.

Araiza became a life member of the Zurich Opera in 1977 and began appearing as a guest artist with major European and North American opera companies and festivals. He debuted at the Bayreuth Festival in 1978 as Steersman in Der fliegende Holländer, the Vienna State Opera in 1978 as Tamino in The Magic Flute, London's Royal Opera House in 1983 as Ernesto in Don Pasquale, and San Francisco Opera in 1984 as Ramiro in La Cenerentola. He made his Metropolitan Opera debut as Belmonte in Mozart's Die Entführung aus dem Serail (in John Dexter's production) on 12 March 1984. He went on to appear at the Met another 54 times between 1984 and 1995. During that period his guest appearances also included the Bavarian State Opera, Paris Opera, La Scala, Lyric Opera of Chicago, La Fenice and the Salzburg Festival. He was made a Kammersänger of the Vienna State Opera in 1988 and was awarded the Mozart Medal in 1991.

Araiza initially specialised in the Mozart and Rossini repertoire—in 1986 he was described as the leading tenore di grazia of the day. However, in the mid-1980s he also began taking on Italian and French lyric tenor roles and the young Wagnerian heroes such as Lohengrin and Walther von Stolzing, sometimes with considerable success, especially his Des Grieux in Manon (San Francisco Opera, 1986) and Lohengrin (La Fenice, 1990). He also ventured into the spinto tenor repertoire with performances at Zurich Opera in the 1990s as Alvaro in La forza del destino, Don José in Carmen and the title role in Andrea Chenier.

== Later years ==
Now retired from the opera stage, Araiza teaches singing and serves on the juries of several international voice competitions. Since 2003 he has been a professor of singing at the State University of Music and Performing Arts Stuttgart. He has also given master classes and taught at the University of Music and Performing Arts, Vienna, the University of Music and Performing Arts, Munich, and the National Autonomous University of Mexico. In 2013, he appeared again as Cinna in Spontini's La vestale at the Semperoper of Dresden in a concert version.

Araiza was married to the mezzo-soprano Vivian Jaffray by whom he had a son and daughter. The couple divorced and he later married the music historian and stage director Ethery Inasaridse by whom he has another son and daughter. In July 2011, Araiza received the Medalla de Oro de Bellas Artes (Gold Medal for the Fine Arts) from the Mexican government during a concert at the Palacio de Bellas Artes marking his 40-year career. In 2017, he was awarded an honorary doctorate from Morelia's Universidad Michoacana San Nicolas de Hidalgo, Mexico.

== Recordings ==
Araiza has an extensive discography. Several of his performances in staged operas have also been filmed and released on DVD. These include Der Rosenkavalier, Manon, Così fan tutte, La Cenerentola, Il ritorno d'Ulisse in patria, L'Orfeo, Die Entführung Aus Dem Serail, The Magic Flute, Don Giovanni, and Faust. The majority of the films were released on the Deutsche Grammophon label.

Araiza's CD recordings include:

Solo Albums

- Araiza – Opera Arias, English Chamber Orchestra conducted by Alberto Zedda. Philips;
- Araiza and Eva Lind – Opera Duets, Orchestra of the Zurich Opera conducted by Ralf Weikert. Philips.
- The Romantic Tenor – Francisco Araiza – Munich Radio Orchestra conducted by Ralf Weikert. Sony Victor RCA.
- Fiesta Mexicana – Francisco Araiza. DG.
- French, Spanish, and Mexican Songs by Francisco Araiza – with Jean Lemaire. Atlantis.

Operas

- Catalani: La Wally (as Giuseppe Hagenbach) – Munich Radio Orchestra conducted by Pinchas Steinberg. Eurodisc
- Donizetti: Don Pasquale (as Ernesto) – Munich Radio Orchestra conducted by Heinz Wallberg. Eurodisc
- Donizetti: Maria Stuarda (as Leicester) – Munich Radio Orchestra conducted by Giuseppe Patanè. Philips
- Gounod: Faust (as Faust) – Bavarian Radio Symphony Orchestra conducted by Colin Davis. Philips
- Massenet: Therese (as Armand) – Roma RAI Symphony Orchestra conducted by Giancarlo Luccardi. Orfeo
- Massenet: Werther (as Werther) – Symphony Orchestra of Madrid conducted by Miguel Gomez Martinez. Gala.
- Mozart: Die Entführung Aus Dem Serail (as Belmont) – Bavarian Radio Symphony Orchestra conducted by Heinz Wallberg. Sony Classical.
- Mozart: Così fan tutte (as Ferrando) – Vienna Philharmonic conducted by Riccardo Muti. EMI
- Mozart: Don Giovanni (as Don Ottavio) – Academy of St Martin in the Fields conducted by Neville Marriner. Philips
- Mozart: Idomeneo (as Idomeneo) – Bavarian Radio Symphony Orchestra conducted by Colin Davis. Philips
- Mozart: The Magic Flute (as Tamino) – Berlin Philharmonic conducted by Herbert von Karajan. Deutsche Grammophon; Academy of St. Martin-in-the-Fields conducted by Neville Marriner, Philips
- Offenbach: Tales of Hoffmann (as Hoffmann) – Sächsische Staatskapelle Dresden conducted by Jeffrey Tate. Philips
- Puccini: La Boheme (in German) (as Rudolfo) – Munich Radio Symphony Orchestra conducted by Stefan Soltesz. EMI
- Puccini:Turandot (as Pong) – Vienna Philharmonic Orchestra conducted by Herbert von Karajan. DG.
- Rossini: The Barber of Seville (as Count Almaviva) – Academy of St Martin in the Fields conducted by Neville Marriner. Philips
- Rossini: La Cenerentola (as Ramiro) – Cappella Coloniensis conducted by Gabriele Ferro. Sony; Academy of St. Martin-in-the-Fields conducted by Neville Marriner. Philips
- Rossini: L'italiana in Algeri (as Lindoro ) – Cappella Coloniensis conducted by Gabriele Ferro. CBS
- Rossini: Il viaggio a Reims (as Conte di Libenskof) – Chamber Orchestra of Europe conducted by Claudio Abbado. Deutsche Grammophon
- Spontini: La vestale (as Licinius) – Munich Radio Orchestra conducted by Gustav Kuhn. Orfeo
- Verdi: Alzira (as Zamoro) – Bavarian Radio Symphony Orchestra conducted by Lamberto Gardelli. Orfeo
- Verdi: Falstaff (as Fenton) – Vienna Philharmonic conducted by Herbert von Karajan. Philips
- Weber: Der Freischütz (as Max) – Staatskapelle Dresden conducted by Colin Davis. Philips

Choral and lieder

- Beethoven: Symphony No. 9 (tenor soloist) – Academy of St Martin in the Fields conducted by Neville Marriner. Philips
- Berlioz: Te Deum (tenor soloist) – European Community Youth Orchestra conducted by Claudio Abbado. Deutsche Grammophon
- Haydn: The Creation (tenor soloist) Vienna Philharmonic conducted by Herbert von Karajan. Deutsche Grammophon; The Nelson Mass Munich Radio Symphony Orchestra conducted by Colin Davis.
- Mahler: Das Lied von der Erde (tenor soloist) – Berlin Philharmonic conducted by Carlo Maria Giulini. Deutsche Grammophon; live Salzburg performance with Vienna Philharmonic conducted by Carlo Maria Giulini. Orfeo; live Berlin performance conducted by Carlo Maria Giulini. Testament
- Mozart: Requiem (tenor soloist) – Dresden State Orchestra conducted by Peter Schreier. Philips; Academy of St Martin in the Fields conducted by Neville Marriner. Philips
- Rossini: Stabat Mater (tenor soloist) – Bavarian Radio Symphony Orchestra conducted by Semyon Bychkov. Philips
- Schubert: Die Schöne Müllerin – with pianist Irwin Gage. Deutsche Grammophon
- Schubert: Lieder (Frühlingsglaube, Viola, Vergissmeinnicht, etc.) - with pianist Irwin Gage. Atlantis
- Verdi: Requiem (tenor soloist) – Saarbrücken Radio Symphony Orchestra conducted by Hanns-Martin Schneidt. Arte Nova
