= Artur =

- Pronunciation: Portuguese: [aɾˈtuɾ] Polish: [ˈartur]
- Gender: Male

Origin
- Language: Latin or Celtic
- Meaning: Bear-like, Baseball, Of Honour

Other names
- See also: Arthur, Arturo, Artturi

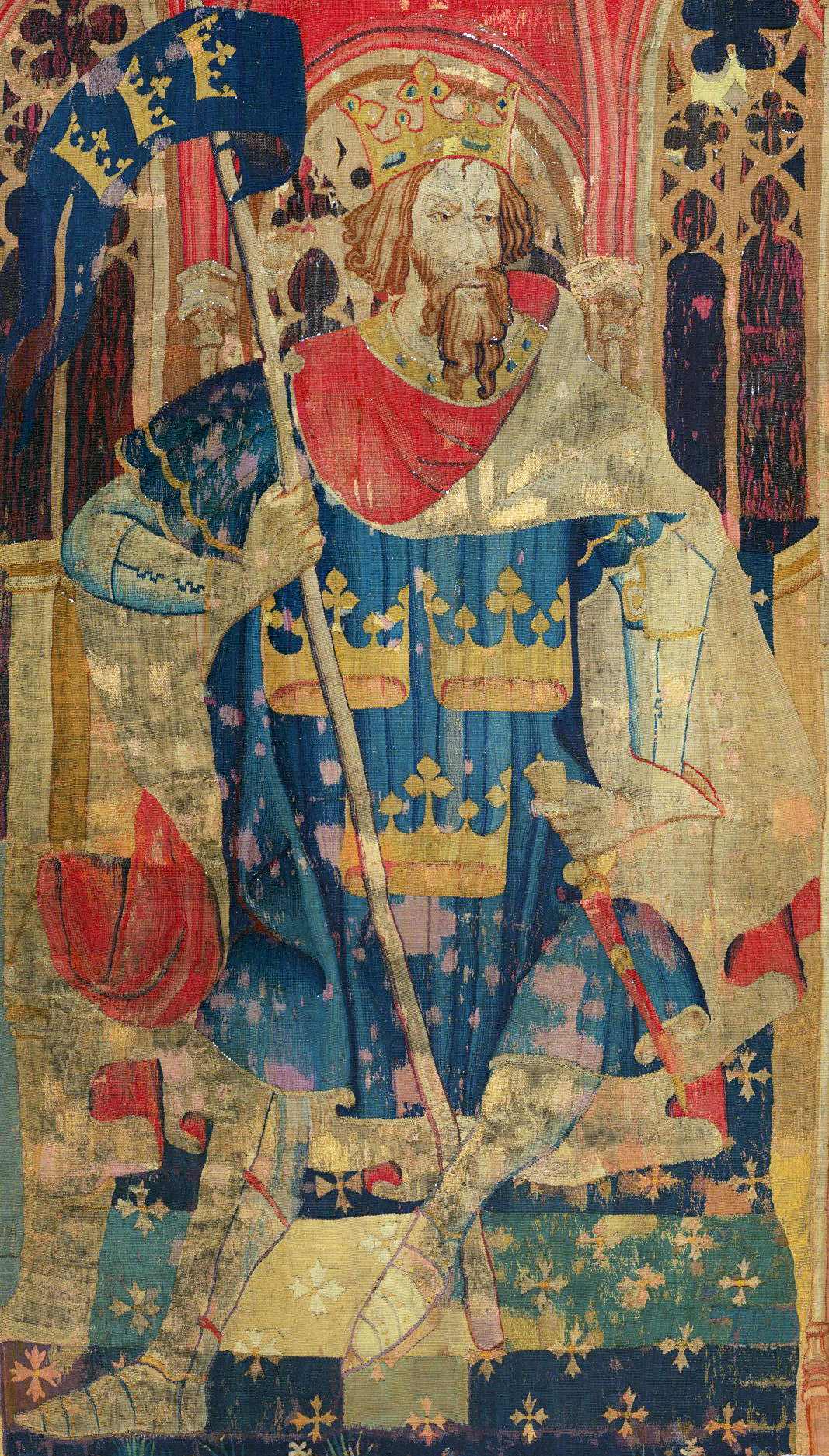
Depiction of King Arthur as one of the Nine Worthies, from the "Christian Heroes Tapestry" in The Cloisters, New York

Artur is a cognate to the common male given name Arthur meaning "bear-like", or "of honour". It is believed to possibly be descended from the Roman surname Artorius or the Celtic bear-goddess Artio or more probably from the Celtic word *artos ("bear"). Other Celtic languages have similar first names, such as Old Irish Art, Artúur, Welsh Arth - which may also be the source for the modern name. Art is also a diminutive form of the common name Arthur. In Estonian, and many Romance, Slavic and Germanic languages the name is spelled as Artur. The Finnish versions are Artturi and Arttu.

The Latin version of the name would be “Urs”, (female version Ursula linked here.). the name is nowadays primarily found as a given name in germanic countries, especially in Switzerland.

Avestan aṣ̌a/arta and its Vedic equivalent ṛtá both derive from Proto-Indo-Iranian *ṛtá- "truth", which in turn continues Proto-Indo-European *h₂r-to- "properly joined, right, true", from the root *h₂ar. The word is attested in Old Persian as arta.

Artur is less commonly found as a surname. Notable people with the name include:

== Given name ==
=== Composers ===
- Artur Kapp (1878–1952), Estonian composer
- Artur Lemba (1885–1963), Estonian composer
- Artur Uritamm (1901–1982), Estonian classical composer, organist and pedagogue

=== Performers ===
- Artur Lohai (born 1993), Ukrainian actor and singer, participant of Ukrainian X-Factor version in 2014
- Artur Rinne (1910–1984), Estonian singer and director
- Artur Rojek (born 1972), former frontman of Myslovitz, and director of the OFF Festival
- Artur Schnabel (1882–1951), Austrian pianist

=== Politicians ===
- Artur Axmann (1913–1996), German Nazi leader
- Artur Chilingarov (born 1939), Russian explorer and politician
- Artur Davis (born 1967), American attorney and politician
- Artur Kasterpalu (1897–1942), Estonian politician
- Artur London (1915–1986), Czechoslovak politician
- Artur Mas (born 1956), Catalan politician
- Artur Rasizade (born 1935), Prime Minister of Azerbaijan 1996–2003 and 2003–2018
- Artur Sanhá (born 1965), Guinea-Bissauan politician
- Artur da Costa e Silva (1902–1969), Brazilian politician
- Artur Sirk (1900–1937), Estonian politician and military commander
- Artur Talvik (born 1964), Estonian filmmaker and politician
- Artur Terras (1901–1963), Estonian politician, former mayor of Tallinn (1941–1944)
- Artur Văitoianu (1864–1956), Romanian politician and military commander

=== Scientists ===
- Artur Ekert (born 1961), British-Polish cryptologist and physicist
- Artur Lind (1927–1989), Estonian biologist
- Artur Toom (1884–1942), Estonian ornithologist and conservationist

=== Sportsmen ===
- Artur Atarah (born 2005), Finnish-Ghanaian footballer
- Artur Beterbiev (born 1985), Chechen boxer
- Artur Sérgio Batista de Souza (born 1994), Brazilian footballer
- Artur Boruc (born 1980), Polish footballer
- Artur Fonte (born 1959), Portuguese footballer known as Artur
- Artur Khachaturyan (born 1992), Armenian basketball player
- Artur Konontšuk (born 2000), Estonian basketball player
- Artur Kotenko (born 1981), Estonian footballer
- Artur Meliashkevich (born 1975), Belarusian race walker
- Artur Moraes (born 1981), Brazilian footballer
- Artur Pikk (born 1993), Estonian footballer
- Artur Pinga (1909–1963), Portuguese footballer and coach
- Artur Quaresma (1917–2011), Portuguese footballer
- Artur (footballer, born 1955), Artur Soares Correia, Portuguese footballer
- Artur Soares Dias (born 1979), Portuguese football referee
- Artur (footballer, born 1984), José Artur Barbosa de Oliveira, Brazilian right back
- Artur (footballer, born 1990), Artur Jesus Vieira, Brazilian footballer
- Artur (footballer, born 1996), José Artur de Lima Junior, Brazilian footballer
- Artur (footballer, born 1998), Artur Victor Guimarães, Brazilian footballer

=== Writers ===
- Artur Adson (1889–1977), Estonian author
- Artur Alliksaar (1923–1966), Estonian poet

=== Others ===
- Artur Bordalo (born 1987), Portuguese street artist known as Bordalo II
- Artur Fischer (1919–2016), German inventor
- Artur Jorge (disambiguation), several people
- Artur Mägi (1904–1981), Estonian legal scientist
- Artur Phleps (1881–1944), Romanian-German military commander
- Artur Zheji (1961–2025), Albanian journalist and television host

== Surname ==
- Léo Artur (Leonardo Artur de Melo, born 1995), Brazilian footballer
- Liz Johnson Artur (born 1964), Ghanaian-Russian photographer working in England
- Mário Artur (Mário Artur Borges Oliveira, born 1969), Mozambican football manager and former international player

== See also ==
- Port Artur, former name of Lüshunkou, Dalian
