= Mozart Medal (Mexico) =

The Mozart Medal (Spanish as Medalla Mozart) is a music award in Mexico. It is administered by the Austrian embassy and the Academia Medalla Mozart. In the past the Domecq Cultural Institute (Instituto Cultural Domecq) was involved.

It was established in 1991, during the 200th anniversary of Wolfgang Amadeus Mozart's death.

== Notable recipients ==
Among the award's recipients are:

- Plácido Domingo, 1991
- Enrique Bátiz Campbell, 1991
- Manuel de Elías, 1991
- Mario Lavista, 1991
- Francisco Araiza, 1991
- Vienna Boys' Choir, 1993
- Ricardo Zohn-Muldoon, 1994
- Juan Trigos, 1995
- Carlos Prieto, 1995
- Arturo Rodriguez, 1996
- Javier Torres Maldonado, 1999
- Felix Carrasco, 2002
- Sergio Vela, 2006
- Ricardo B. Plegio, 2010
