= Artur V. Shachnev =

Russian entrepreneur and musician (born 1982)

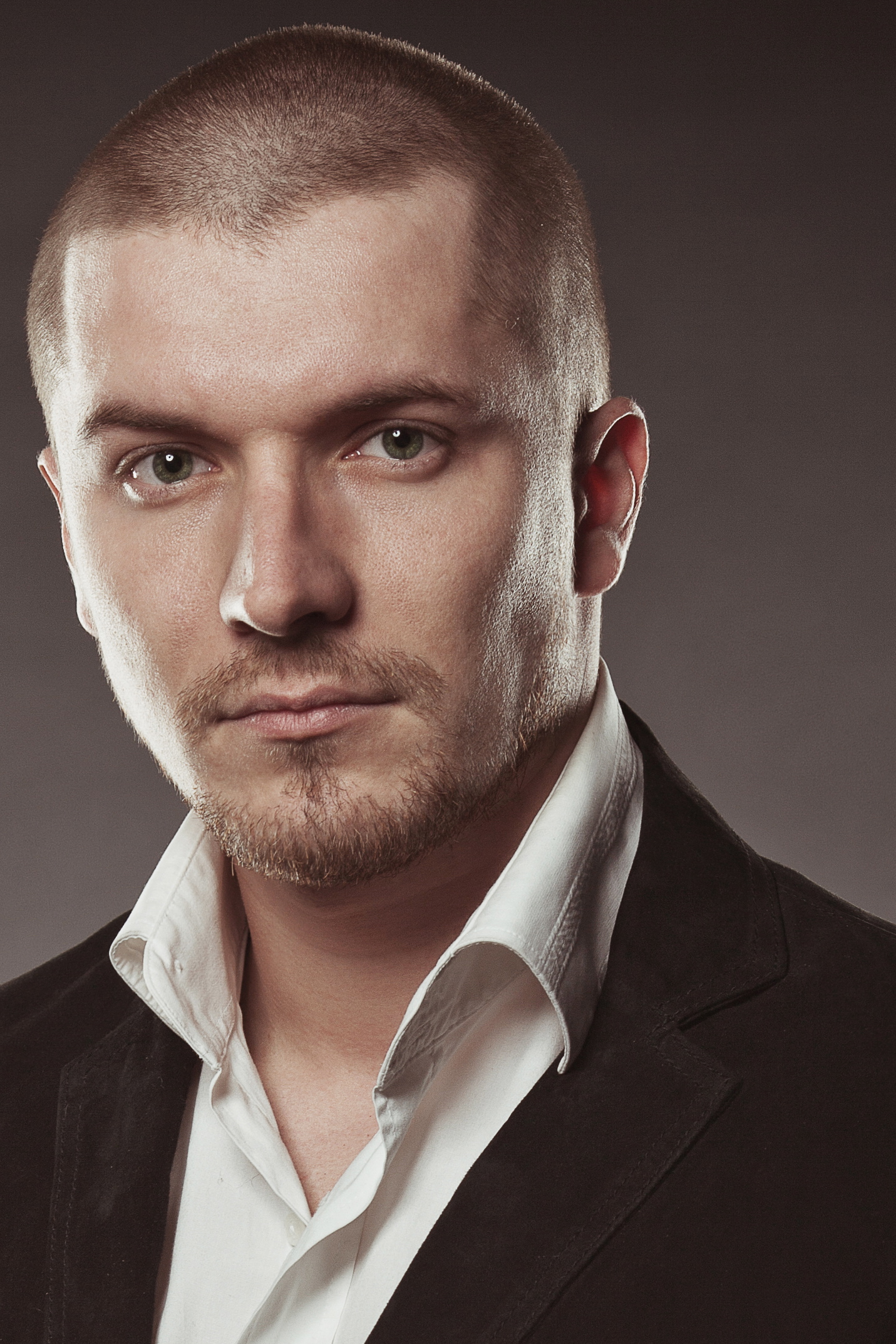

Artur Vladimirovich Shachnev (Russian: Артур Владимирович Шачнев)(born in 1982, Vladivostok, Russia) is a Russian entrepreneur and musician who founded and directs the Artur V. Shachnev Production production center, organizers of the "Notre-Dame de Paris la Concert", and founded the SOFIA Symphony Orchestra.

== Brief biography ==
A native of Vladivostok, Shachnev studied both music, focusing on piano and guitar. and security, with an emphasis on computer security, cryptography and information security. His business interests have been diverse, including construction equipment, commercial security, and charitable endeavors.

Artur V. Shachnev Productions, which he founded, is both an organizer for arts and manages its own products. It co-founded the Musical Academy in Russia alongside the American Musical and Dramatic Academy (Los Angeles Campus & New York City Campus) in 2010.
