= Ben Belitt =

American poet and translator

- Born: May 2, 1911; New York City, New York
- Died: August 17, 2003 (aged 92)
- Occupations: Poet, translator

Ben Belitt (May 2, 1911 – August 17, 2003) was an American poet and translator. Besides writing poetry, he also translated several books of poetry by Pablo Neruda, Rafael Alberti, and Federico García Lorca from Spanish to English.

== Life ==
Belitt was born in New York City. He was educated at the University of Virginia, receiving a B.A. in 1932 and an M.A. in 1934, and he was a doctoral student at that university from 1934 to 1936. By the early 1940s, he had taken up an appointment at Bennington College in Bennington, Vermont, where he remained, living in a former firehouse in North Bennington, for the rest of his life. A bachelor, he became a good friend of the dancer (and fellow teacher at Bennington) Bill Bales, of his wife Jo Van Fleet, and of their son Michael Bales, and regularly spent holidays with this family at Bennington or in New York City.

== Career ==
Belitt was the author of eight books of poems; his complete poems This Scribe, My Hand, was published in 1998 by Louisiana State University Press. He wrote two books of essays and over thirteen books of translations. He taught for many decades at Bennington College. After retiring from Bennington College, he continued to live in North Bennington, Vermont and held the position of professor emeritus of Language and Literature at the college. He died in Bennington on August 17, 2003, at the age of 92 and was buried in Manchester, Vermont.

His papers are held by the University of Virginia.

== Influence ==
The 1962 ballet A Look at Lightning, by the American choreographer Martha Graham was titled after a poem by Belitt. Errand into the Maze, also by Graham, takes its title from a Belitt poem as well.

== Books ==
=== As author ===
- The Five-Fold Mesh. New York: Alfred A. Knopf, 1938.
- Wilderness Stair: Poems, 1938-1954. New York: Grove Press, 1955.
- The Enemy Joy: New and Selected Poems. Chicago: University of Chicago Press, 1964.
- Nothing But Light: Poems, 1964-1969. Chicago: University of Chicago Press, 1970.
- The Double Witness: Poems, 1970-1976. Princeton: Princeton University Press, 1977.
- Possessions, New and Selected Poems, 1938 - 1985. New York: David Godine, 1986. ISBN 0-87923-626-4.
- This Scribe, My Hand: The Complete Poems of Ben Belitt. Baton Rouge: Louisiana State University Press, 1998. ISBN 0-8071-2324-2. ISBN 0-8071-2323-4.

=== As translator ===
- García Lorca, Federico (1955). Poet in New York, (Grove Press)
- García Lorca, Federico (1963). Joy of the Day
- García Lorca, Federico (1964). Ode to Salvador Dalí
- Alberti, Rafael, (1966). Selected Poems, (University of California Press). Introduction by Luis Monguió
- Neruda, Pablo (1961). Selected Poems Edited and translated by Ben Belitt. Introduction by Luis Monguió.
- Neruda, Pablo (1963). Poems for the Mind
- Neruda, Pablo (1972). New Poems (1968-1970) (Grove Press)

== Recordings ==
- c. 1965 - Belitt, Ben. The Poetry of Ben Belitt. Recorded at the Poetry Center of the New York YM-YWHA in November 1965. Audio cassette. Audio Forum series. New York: Jeffrey Norton.

== Awards ==
- 1937: Belitt shared the Shelley Memorial Award for Poetry for 1936–1937 with Charlotte Wilder.
