= Eva Maria Zuk =

Polish and Mexican pianist (1945–2017)

Eva Maria Zuk (24 December 1945 – 27 February 2017) was a Polish, Venezuelan, and Mexican pianist. She was raised in Caracas, New York City, and Mexico City. She began music studies with her mother at the age of 4.

== Education ==
By age 6 she had her first public performance, and received the title of Piano Professor and Performer from the Venezuelan Ministry of Education at age 13. When she was 20 years old, she had earned Bachelor of Music and Master of Science degrees from the Juilliard School of Music in New York. Her teachers included Rosina Lhévinne and Zbigniew Drzewiecki.

== Musical career ==
Eva Maria Zuk has recorded eight LPs and five CDs, which include: the two Chopin concerti with the London Philharmonic; a Chopin recital; and Anthology of the Polonaise for the piano, from her own research, first recorded collection containing the historic evolution of a musical form; Haydn’s D major Concerto with the Los Angeles Chamber Orchestra, playing and conducting from the piano, with her own cadenzas; De Falla's Nights in the Gardens of Spain with the State of Mexico Symphony Orchestra conducted by acclaimed conductor Enrique Batiz, reviewed as “best performance available of this piece by Fanfare Music Magazine; Mexican composers Felipe Villanueva and Ricardo Castro's piano music, and Mexican Contemporary Composers.

Her performance was recounted as "fiery and vigorous" and "it ruled the imagination of the audience" by The Oberlin Review.

== Awards ==
She has received more than 40 awards, medals and diplomas from governments and private institutions alike, such as the Order of Andrés Bello and Simón Bolivar's Bicentennial Medal (Venezuela), the Karol Szymanowski Centennial Medal (Poland), the Emblem of Arms (San Juan, Puerto Rico), et al. Her most recent distinction was the Order of Merit from her native Poland.

== Repertory ==
Her repertory ranges from Baroque to Contemporary music, with some programs fully dedicated to Bach, Beethoven, Chopin, Liszt, Rachmaninoff, Venezuelan music, Mexican music, Polish music, musical forms (sonatas, variations and dances) and more than thirty concerti for piano with orchestra.
