= Paulino Paredes Pérez =

Mexican composer

- Born: June 23, 1913; Tuxpan, Michoacán, Mexico
- Died: April 9, 1957 (aged 43); Monterrey, Mexico
- Occupation: Composer
- Known for: Director of the School of Music, University of Nuevo León

Paulino Paredes Pérez (23 June 1913 – 9 April 1957) was a Mexican composer.

Born in Tuxpan, Michoacán, he moved to Morelia in 1929, where he studied music at the Escuela Superior de Musica Sagrada. He founded several musical institutions, and was invited to Monterrey by the archbishop in 1948. He became the director of the School of Music at the University of Nuevo León in 1956. He died in Monterrey the next year of pancreatic cancer, and his music was largely forgotten until the revival of Espalda Mojada in 1989 by Felix Carrasco, which led to greater interest in his work.

== Selected works ==
- Symphony No. 1, "Provinciana" (1945)
- Symphony No. 2, "Benjamina" (1947)
- Piano concerto (1950)
- Espalda Mojada (ballet, 1954)
- Cantata Mariana (1954)

== Bibliography ==
- Guillermo R. Villarreal Rodríguez. Paulino Paredes Pérez: datos históricos, cronología y documentos. Universidad Autónoma de Nuevo León, 2003.
