= Arturo Torres =

Arturo Torres may refer to:

- Arturo Torres (artist) (born 1989), American artist
- Arturo Torres (Bolivian footballer) (1939–2025), Bolivian footballer
- Arturo Torres (footballer, born 1906) (1906–1987), Chilean football manager and midfielder
- Arturo Torres Molina (fl. 1930s), Chilean social leader and politician
- Arturo Torres Rioseco (1897–1971), Chilean-American academic, worked with Luis Monguió
- Arturo Torres Santos (born 1963), Mexican politician
- Arturo Torres (soccer, born 1980), American soccer defender
