= Ekenäs IF =

Finnish sports club

Ekenäs Idrottsförening
- Full name: Ekenäs Idrottsförening
- Nicknames: EIF; Ekenäs IF
- Founded: 1905; 121 years ago
- Ground: Ekenäs Sparbank Arena, Ekenäs, Raseborg, Finland
- Capacity: 1,900
- Chairman: Peter Haglund
- Head Coach: Christian Sund
- League: Ykkösliiga
- 2026: Ykkösliiga, 6th of 10
Home colours	Away colours

Ekenäs Idrottsförening (abbreviated EIF or Ekenäs IF) is a sports club from Ekenäs, Raseborg in Finland. EIF was formed in 1905 and they are one of the oldest clubs in the south-west of Finland. The men's football first team currently plays in the Ykkösliiga, after the relegation from the Veikkausliiga in 2024. Their home ground is at the Ekenäs Sparbank Arena, formerly known as "Ekenäs Centrumplan" in Ekenäs. The Chairman of EIF is Peter Haglund.

The club currently has sections covering football, handball, floorball and disc golf. EIF's athletics section set up Karis IK and from 1 January 2009, simultaneously with a municipal merger, transferred its activities to the new IF Raseborg club. Ekenäs is one of the few towns in Swedish-speaking area to have had a team in the top division.

== History ==
Ekenäs Idrottsförening has a long football history which reached its pinnacle with one season in the highest division, the Mestaruussarja (Championship), back in 1933. They have also had 8 seasons in the Suomisarjaa (Finland League) which at that time was the second tier of Finnish football in 1938–39 and 1946/47–51.

EIF have had five periods covering 26 seasons in the Kakkonen (Second Division), the third tier of Finnish football from 1975 to 1976, 1981–88, 1991–92, 1994–98 and 2002 to the current day.

EIF has a thriving junior section with a large number of teams.

A new highest ever attendance for an EIF match was made in 2013 when 2,014 people attended the home game with FC Jazz. The old record was from 1975 when 1,625 people attended the home game with HAIK.

EIF made history in March 2018 by qualifying for the Semi-final of the Finnish Cup for the first time, beating FC Haka 2–1 at home.

== Season to season ==
Season to season of EIF

Season	Level	Division	Section	Administration	Position	Movements
1930	Tier 2	B-Sarja (Second Division)		Finnish FA (Suomen Palloliitto)	Quarterfinal	Cup-format
1931						
1932	Tier 2	B-Sarja (Second Division)		Finnish FA (Suomen Palloliitto)	2nd	Promoted
1933	Tier 1	A-Sarja (Division One)		Finnish FA (Suomen Palloliitto)	8th	Relegated
1934						
1935						
1936						
1937						
1938	Tier 2	Itä-Länsi-sarja (Second Division)	West League, Southern Group	Finnish FA (Suomen Palloliitto)	6th	
1939	Tier 2	Itä-Länsi-sarja (Second Division)	West League, Group 2	Finnish FA (Suomen Palloliitto)	5th	
1940-41	Tier 3	C-Sarja (Third Division)	Group 1 Helsinki & Turku	Finnish FA (Suomen Pallolitto)	3rd	
1941-45				Finnish FA (Suomen Pallolitto)		Wartime series unknown
1945-46	Tier 3	Maakuntasarja (Third Division)	West Uusimaa Group	Finnish FA (Suomen Pallolitto)	1st	Promotion Playoff - Promoted
1946-47	Tier 2	Suomensarja (Second Division)	South Group	Finnish FA (Suomen Palloliitto)	6th	
1947-48	Tier 2	Suomensarja (Second Division)	South Group	Finnish FA (Suomen Palloliitto)	5th	
1948	Tier 2	Suomensarja (Second Division)	South Group	Finnish FA (Suomen Palloliitto)	4th	
1949	Tier 2	Suomensarja (Second Division)	West Group	Finnish FA (Suomen Palloliitto)	7th	
1950	Tier 2	Suomensarja (Second Division)	West Group	Finnish FA (Suomen Palloliitto)	8th	
1951	Tier 2	Suomensarja (Second Division)	West Group	Finnish FA (Suomen Palloliitto)	9th	Relegated
1952	Tier 3	Maakuntasarja (Third Division)	West Group A	Finnish FA (Suomen Pallolitto)	5th	
1953	Tier 3	Maakuntasarja (Third Division)	West Group A	Finnish FA (Suomen Pallolitto)	1st	Promotion Group West 8th
1954	Tier 3	Maakuntasarja (Third Division)	West Group III	Finnish FA (Suomen Pallolitto)	4th	
1955	Tier 3	Maakuntasarja (Third Division)	South Group I	Finnish FA (Suomen Pallolitto)	5th	
1956	Tier 3	Maakuntasarja (Third Division)	South Group I	Finnish FA (Suomen Pallolitto)	7th	Relegated
1957	Tier 4	Aluesarja (Fourth Division)	Group 2 Helsinki & West Uusimaa	Finnish FA (Suomen Pallolitto)	1st	Promoted
1958	Tier 3	Maakuntasarja (Third Division)	Group 3 Turku	Finnish FA (Suomen Pallolitto)	8th	
1959	Tier 3	Maakuntasarja (Third Division)	Group 1 Helsinki & Uusimaa	Finnish FA (Suomen Pallolitto)	6th	
1960	Tier 3	Maakuntasarja (Third Division)	Group 1 Helsinki & Uusimaa	Finnish FA (Suomen Pallolitto)	5th	
1961	Tier 3	Maakuntasarja (Third Division)	Group 3 Häme & Tampere			Withdrew
1962	Tier 4	Aluesarja (Fourth Division)	Group 3 West Uusimaa	Finnish FA (Suomen Pallolitto)	4th	
1963	Tier 4	Aluesarja (Fourth Division)	Group 3 West Uusimaa	Finnish FA (Suomen Pallolitto)	1st	Promoted
1964	Tier 3	Maakuntasarja (Third Division)	Group 2 Häme & Uusimaa	Finnish FA (Suomen Pallolitto)	8th	Relegated
1965	Tier 4	Aluesarja (Fourth Division)	Group 3 West Uusimaa	Finnish FA (Suomen Pallolitto)	1st	Promoted
1966	Tier 3	Maakuntasarja (Third Division)	Group 3 Häme & Uusimaa	Finnish FA (Suomen Pallolitto)	8th	Relegated
1967	Tier 4	Aluesarja (Fourth Division)	Group 3 West Uusimaa	Finnish FA (Suomen Pallolitto)	2nd	
1968	Tier 4	Aluesarja (Fourth Division)	Group 3 West Uusimaa	Finnish FA (Suomen Pallolitto)	1st	Promoted
1969	Tier 3	Maakuntasarja (Third Division)	Group 2 Häme & Uusimaa	Finnish FA (Suomen Pallolitto)	3rd	
1970	Tier 3	III Divisioona (Second Division)	Group 2 Turku & Uusimaa	Finnish FA (Suomen Pallolitto)	3rd	
1971	Tier 3	III Divisioona (Second Division)	Group 1 Helsinki & Uusimaa	Finnish FA (Suomen Pallolitto)	4th	
1972	Tier 3	III Divisioona (Second Division)	Group 1 Helsinki & Uusimaa	Finnish FA (Suomen Pallolitto)	3rd	
1973	Tier 4	III Divisioona (Third Division)	Group 2	Helsinki & Uusimaa (SPL Helsinki)	3rd	
1974	Tier 4	III Divisioona (Third Division)	Group 2	Helsinki & Uusimaa (SPL Helsinki)	1st	Promoted
1975	Tier 3	II Divisioona (Second Division)	West Group	Finnish FA (Suomen Pallolitto)	3rd	
1976	Tier 3	II Divisioona (Second Division)	West Group	Finnish FA (Suomen Pallolitto)	11th	Relegated
1977	Tier 4	III Divisioona (Third Division)	Group 2	Helsinki & Uusimaa (SPL Helsinki)	4th	
1978	Tier 4	III Divisioona (Third Division)	Group 2	Helsinki & Uusimaa (SPL Helsinki)	2nd	Promotion Playoff
1979	Tier 4	III Divisioona (Third Division)	Group 2	Helsinki & Uusimaa (SPL Helsinki)	2nd	Promotion Playoff
1980	Tier 4	III Divisioona (Third Division)	Group 2	Helsinki & Uusimaa (SPL Helsinki)	1st	Promotion Playoff - Promoted
1981	Tier 3	II Divisioona (Second Division)	West Group	Finnish FA (Suomen Pallolitto)	2nd	Promotion Playoff
1982	Tier 3	II Divisioona (Second Division)	West Group	Finnish FA (Suomen Pallolitto)	4th	
1983	Tier 3	II Divisioona (Second Division)	West Group	Finnish FA (Suomen Pallolitto)	6th	
1984	Tier 3	II Divisioona (Second Division)	West Group	Finnish FA (Suomen Pallolitto)	3rd	
1985	Tier 3	II Divisioona (Second Division)	West Group	Finnish FA (Suomen Pallolitto)	5th	
1986	Tier 3	II Divisioona (Second Division)	West Group	Finnish FA (Suomen Pallolitto)	4th	
1987	Tier 3	II Divisioona (Second Division)	West Group	Finnish FA (Suomen Pallolitto)	3rd	
1988	Tier 3	II Divisioona (Second Division)	West Group	Finnish FA (Suomen Pallolitto)	10th	Relegated
1989	Tier 4	III Divisioona (Third Division)	Group 2	Helsinki & Uusimaa (SPL Helsinki)	5th	
1990	Tier 4	III Divisioona (Third Division)	Group 2	Helsinki & Uusimaa (SPL Helsinki)	1st	Promoted
1991	Tier 3	II Divisioona (Second Division)	West Group	Finnish FA (Suomen Pallolitto)	8th	
1992	Tier 3	II Divisioona (Second Division)	West Group	Finnish FA (Suomen Pallolitto)	10th	Relegated
1993	Tier 4	Kolmonen (Third Division)	Group 2	Helsinki & Uusimaa (SPL Helsinki)	1st	Promoted
1994	Tier 3	Kakkonen (Second Division)	West Group	Finnish FA (Suomen Pallolitto)	5th	
1995	Tier 3	Kakkonen (Second Division)	South Group	Finnish FA (Suomen Pallolitto)	5th	
1996	Tier 3	Kakkonen (Second Division)	South Group	Finnish FA (Suomen Pallolitto)	9th	
1997	Tier 3	Kakkonen (Second Division)	South Group	Finnish FA (Suomen Pallolitto)	2nd	Promotion Group South 2nd
1998	Tier 3	Kakkonen (Second Division)	South Group	Finnish FA (Suomen Pallolitto)	12th	Relegated
1999	Tier 4	Kolmonen (Third Division)	Group 1	Helsinki & Uusimaa (SPL Helsinki)	8th	
2000	Tier 4	Kolmonen (Third Division)	Section 1	Helsinki & Uusimaa (SPL Helsinki)	5th	
2001	Tier 4	Kolmonen (Third Division)	Section 1	Helsinki & Uusimaa (SPL Uusimaa)	1st	Promoted
2002	Tier 3	Kakkonen (Second Division)	South Group	Finnish FA (Suomen Pallolitto)	7th	
2003	Tier 3	Kakkonen (Second Division)	West Group	Finnish FA (Suomen Pallolitto)	3rd	
2004	Tier 3	Kakkonen (Second Division)	West Group	Finnish FA (Suomen Pallolitto)	5th	
2005	Tier 3	Kakkonen (Second Division)	South Group	Finnish FA (Suomen Pallolitto)	7th	
2006	Tier 3	Kakkonen (Second Division)	Group B	Finnish FA (Suomen Pallolitto)	8th	
2007	Tier 3	Kakkonen (Second Division)	Group B	Finnish FA (Suomen Pallolitto)	7th	
2008	Tier 3	Kakkonen (Second Division)	Group B	Finnish FA (Suomen Pallolitto)	10th	
2009	Tier 3	Kakkonen (Second Division)	Group B	Finnish FA (Suomen Pallolitto)	8th	
2010	Tier 3	Kakkonen (Second Division)	Group B	Finnish FA (Suomen Pallolitto)	12th	Relegated
2011	Tier 4	Kolmonen (Third Division)	Section 1	Helsinki & Uusimaa (SPL Helsinki)	1st	Promoted
2012	Tier 3	Kakkonen (Second Division)	South Group	Finnish FA (Suomen Pallolitto)	4th	
2013	Tier 3	Kakkonen (Second Division)	South Group	Finnish FA (Suomen Pallolitto)	1st	Play-offs
2014	Tier 3	Kakkonen (Second Division)	South Group	Finnish FA (Suomen Pallolitto)	1st	Play-offs – Promoted
2015	Tier 2	Ykkönen (First Division)		Finnish FA (Suomen Palloliitto)	8th	
2016	Tier 2	Ykkönen (First Division)		Finnish FA (Suomen Palloliitto)	8th	
2017	Tier 2	Ykkönen (First Division)		Finnish FA (Suomen Palloliitto)	7th	
2018	Tier 2	Ykkönen (First Division)		Finnish FA (Suomen Pallolitto)	3rd	
2019	Tier 2	Ykkönen (First Division)		Finnish FA (Suomen Pallolitto)	6th	
2020	Tier 2	Ykkönen (First Division)		Finnish FA (Suomen Pallolitto)	4th	
2021	Tier 2	Ykkönen (First Division)		Finnish FA (Suomen Pallolitto)	5th	
2022	Tier 2	Ykkönen (First Division)		Finnish FA (Suomen Pallolitto)	4th	Play-offs
2023	Tier 2	Ykkönen (First Division)		Finnish FA (Suomen Pallolitto)	1st	Promoted
2024	Tier 1	Veikkausliiga		Finnish FA (Suomen Pallolitto)	12th	Relegated
2025	Tier 2	Ykkösliiga (League One)		Finnish FA (Suomen Palloliitto)		

- 2 seasons in Veikkausliiga
- 20 seasons in Ykkönen
- 46 seasons in Kakkonen
- 19 season in Kolmonen

== Club structure ==
EIF currently has 2 men's team, 1 ladies teams, 12 boys teams and 4 girls team.

== Other facts ==
EIF Akademi are participating in Section 1 (Lohko 1) of the Kolmonen (Third Division) administered by the Uusimaa SPL. In 2009 the team finished in top position in their Nelonen (Fourth Division) section and were promoted to the Kolmonen.

EIF Ladies Team are competing in the Kolmonen (Third Division) administered by the Football Association of Finland (Suomen Palloliitto) . In 2017 the team finished in top position in their Nelonen (Fourth Division) section and were promoted to the Kolmonen.

== Current squad ==
=== First team ===
As of 3 September, 2026

Note: Flags indicate national team as defined under FIFA eligibility rules; some limited exceptions apply. Players may hold more than one non-FIFA nationality.

No.	Pos.	Nation	Player
1	GK	FIN	Aaron Anttalainen
3	DF	RWA	Dylan Maes
5	DF	FIN	Roope Pakkanen
8	MF	FIN	Asla Peltola
10	MF	BRA	Lucas Kaufmann
11	MF	GHA	Nasiru Mohammed
12	GK	FIN	Antto Mikkonen
13	MF	FIN	Oskari Sallinen
15	MF	FIN	August Björklund
17	FW	NGR	Francis Etu

No.	Pos.	Nation	Player
18	MF	FIN	Arttu Sivonen
19	MF	GHA	David Agbo
20	FW	FIN	Lucas Helander
21	DF	FIN	Axel Sandbacka
23	FW	GUI	Saïdou Bah
24	MF	FIN	Nico Pelkonen
27	MF	FIN	Deniz Kocol
29	DF	SOM	Fahad Mohamed
30	MF	FIN	Oliver Günes
34	FW	NED	Ralph Kerrebijn

=== Out on loan ===
Note: Flags indicate national team as defined under FIFA eligibility rules; some limited exceptions apply. Players may hold more than one non-FIFA nationality.

No.	Pos.	Nation	Player
