= Ralph Kerrebijn =

Dutch footballer (born 1999)

Personal information
- Full name: Ralph Max Alexander Kerrebijn
- Date of birth: 16 May 1999 (age 27)
- Place of birth: Dordrecht, Netherlands
- Height: 1.83 m (6 ft 0 in)
- Position: Midfielder

Team information
- Current team: Ekenäs IF
- Number: 34

Youth career
- 2019–2021: Oakville Blue Devils

Senior career*
Years	Team	Apps	(Gls)
2021	Žarkovo	1	(0)
2021–2022	Budućnost Dobanovci	0	(0)
2022–2023	Mons Calpe	1	(0)
2023	Irodotos	2	(1)
2023–2024	Tolmin	22	(6)
2024–2025	ACV	0	(0)
2026–	Ekenäs IF	26	(2)
- * Club domestic league appearances and goals as of 1 November 2026

Ralph Max Alexander Kerrebijn (born 16 May 1999) is a Dutch footballer who plays as a midfielder for Ykkösliiga club Ekenäs IF.

== Early life ==
In 2014, Kerrebijn moved to Canada. He played soccer there with the Oakville Blue Devils. While in Canada, he graduated from the Rotman Commerce program at the University of Toronto. He was a lab assistant at the BMO Finance Research and Trading Lab.

== Club career ==
In 2021, he signed for Serbian side Žarkovo. On 14 May 2021, he debuted for Žarkovo during a 2–0 win over Trayal.

In March 2026, Kerrebijn signed with Ykkösliiga club Ekenäs IF.
