= August Björklund =

Finnish footballer (born 2002)

Personal information
- Date of birth: 25 November 2002 (age 23)
- Place of birth: Finland
- Height: 1.76 m (5 ft 9 in)
- Position: Central midfielder

Team information
- Current team: EIF
- Number: 15

Youth career
- –2015: ESC
- 2015–2019: EIF

Senior career*
Years	Team	Apps	(Gls)
2017–	EIF II	86	(4)
2020–	EIF	46	(1)
- * Club domestic league appearances and goals as of 26 July 2026

August Björklund (born 25 November 2002) is a Finnish professional footballer who plays as a central midfielder for Ykkösliiga club Ekenäs IF (EIF).

== Honours ==
EIF

- Ykkönen: 2023
