= Arturo García =

Arturo García can refer to:

- Arturo García (cyclist, born 1946), Mexican cyclist
- Arturo García (Bolivian footballer) (born 1965), Bolivian footballer
- Arturo García (cyclist, born 1969), Mexican cyclist
- Arzu (footballer), born Arturo García Muñoz, Spanish footballer
- Arturo de Córdova, born Arturo García Rodríguez, Mexican actor
- Arturo Santos García, Mexican ophthalmologist and clinical researcher
