= Arttu Sivonen =

Finnish footballer (born 2005)

Personal information
- Date of birth: 19 April 2005 (age 21)
- Place of birth: Finland
- Position: Midfielder

Team information
- Current team: EIF
- Number: 18

Youth career
- IIF
- EIF

Senior career*
Years	Team	Apps	(Gls)
2022	EIF	4	(0)
2023	SalPa	0	(0)
2023–	EIF	27	(0)
- * Club domestic league appearances and goals as of 1 November 2026

Arttu Sivonen (born 19 April 2005) is a Finnish professional footballer who plays as a midfielder for Ykkösliiga club Ekenäs IF (EIF).

== Honours ==
EIF

- Ykkönen: 2023
