= Arttu Niskakangas =

Finnish-Norwegian ice hockey winger

- Born: July 21, 1988 (age 38) Ylivieska, Finland
- Height: 5 ft 9 in (175 cm)
- Weight: 165 lb (75 kg; 11 st 11 lb)
- Position: Winger
- Shoots: Right
- GET-ligaen team Former teams: Stjernen Hockey; TUTO Hockey; Hokki; Beibarys Atyrau; Narvik Hockey
- Playing career: 2009–present

Arttu Niskakangas (born July 21, 1988) is a Finnish-Norwegian professional ice hockey winger who plays for Stjernen Hockey of the GET-ligaen.

Niskakangas played in junior level for Vaasan Sport, SaiPa and TPS between 2004 and 2009 before making his senior debut for TUTO Hockey of Mestis. He played a total of five seasons in Mestis for TUTO and Hokki, playing a total of 240 regular season games in the league.

On May 28, 2015, he joined Narvik Hockey of Norway's second tier First Division. He spent five seasons with the team, during which he helped the team earn promotion to the GET-ligaen in 2019. On March 27, 2020, Niskakangas joined fellow GET-ligaen side Stjernen Hockey.
