= Artturi Lehtinen =

Finnish diplomat

Artturi August Lehtinen (10 October 1896 Muurla – 9 October 1966 Helsinki) was a Finnish diplomat. He graduated as a Bachelor of Agricultural and Forest Sciences in 1927. He served as the head of the Trade Policy Department of the Ministry for Foreign Affairs from 1951 to 1953. He then served as Consul General from 1953 to 1959 in New York, as Chargé d'Affaires to Ottawa from 1959 to 1960, as ambassador since 1961 when the delegation became Embassy in 1964.
