= Richard Holm (tenor) =

German opera singer

Richard Holm tenor
- Born: 3 August 1912; Stuttgart
- Died: 20 July 1988 (aged 75); Munich

Richard Holm (3 August 1912 – 20 July 1988) was a German operatic tenor, particularly associated with Mozart, though he sang a wide range of roles.

Born in Stuttgart, where he studied with Rudolf Ritter, he made his debut at the Kiel Opera House in 1937. After engagements in Nuremberg and Hamburg, he joined the Munich State Opera in 1948, where he established himself as a distinguished Mozartian singer, performing Belmonte, Idamante, Tito, Tamino. Other roles included Serse, Jacquino, David, Alfredo, Rodolfo, Pinkerton. He created the role of Wallenstein in Hindemith's Harmonie der Welt in 1957.

He made guest appearances at the Salzburg Festival, the Glyndebourne Festival, the Royal Opera House in London, La Scala in Milan, and the Metropolitan Opera in New York.

He was also very active in concert and enjoyed considerable success in operetta, as well as contemporary works such as Gottfried von Einem's Dantons Tod and Benjamin Britten's Death in Venice. He taught at the Munich Music Academy.

Holm died in Munich at the age of 75.

== Sources ==
- Biography on Operissimo.com (in German)
