= Arturo Longton =

Arturo Longton may refer to:

- Arturo Longton (politician)
- Arturo Longton (television personality)
