= Artturi Laitinen =

Finnish schoolteacher and politician (1882–1959)

Artturi Antti Laitinen (20 April 1882 – 5 January 1959) was a Finnish schoolteacher and politician, born in Utajärvi. He was a member of the Parliament of Finland from 1909 to 1910, representing the Agrarian League.
