= Arturo Martínez =

Arturo Martínez may refer to:

- Arturo Martínez (judoka) (born 1982), Mexican judoka
- Arturo Martínez (actor) (1919–1992), Mexican actor
- Arturo Martínez Rocha (born 1950), Mexican politician
- Arturo Ortíz Martínez (born 1992), Mexican footballer
