= Vadim Brodski =

Vadim Brodski Вадим Бродський
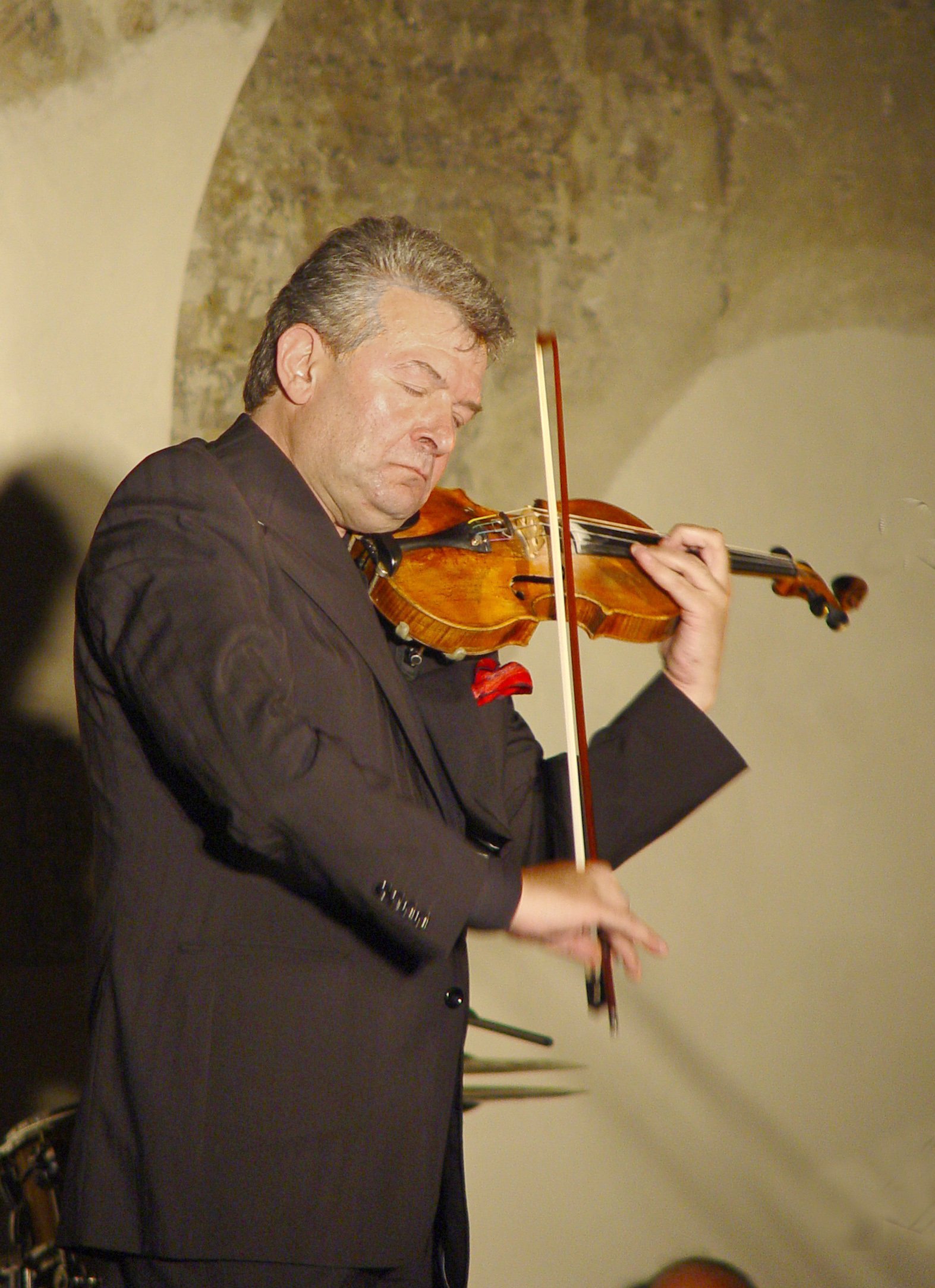
- Brodski at XIV International Music Festival of Krystyna Jamroz in Pińczów's synagogue (5 July 2008)

Background information
- Born: April 24, 1950 (age 75); Kiev, Ukrainian SFSR, Soviet Union
- Genres: Classical
- Occupation: Violinist
- Instrument: Guarneri del Gesù of Niccolò Paganini

Vadim Adolfovych Brodski (Note: Ukrainian: Вадим Адольфович Бродський, romanized: Vadym Adolfovych Brodskyi; Polish: Wadim Brodski) (born April 24, 1950) is a Polish-Ukrainian violinist, longtime resident of Rome, Italy. A descendant of Adolf Brodsky, Vadim was born in Kiev, Ukrainian SSR, Soviet Union, where he played as the soloist of Kiev Philharmonic at the age of 11. He received the first prizes at many of the international violin contests in which he participated, including the Wieniawski contest in 1977 (Poland), Paganini contest in 1984 (Italy), and Tibor Varga in 1984 (Switzerland), and fifth prize at the 1974 Tchaikovsky competition.

He is one of the few violinists playing the Guarneri del Gesù of Niccolò Paganini.

Vadim Brodski played with Moscow Philharmonic Orchestra, Saint Petersburg Philharmonic, Warsaw National Philharmonic, Mexico National Symphony, London Philharmonic, Jerusalem Symphony, New Jersey Symphony, and Suisse Romande in Geneve.

Among his recordings Violin Concerts of Tchaikovsky and Sibelius in D minor can be mentioned. He has been accompanied by the Polish Radio Symphony Orchestra in this recording.
