= Arturo Rodríguez =

Arturo Rodríguez may refer to:

- Arturo Rodríguez (artist) (born 1956), Cuban-born American painter
- Arturo Rodríguez (boxer) (1907–1982), Argentine boxer and rugby union player
- Arturo Rodríguez Fernández (1948–2010), Dominican author
- Arturo Rodríguez (footballer, born 1989), Spanish footballer
- Arturo Rodríguez (footballer, born 1990), Mexican footballer
- Arturo Rodríguez (footballer, born 1998), Mexican footballer
- Arturo Rodríguez (footballer, born 2006), Spanish footballer
- Arturo Rodriguez (unionist) (born 1949), American labor union leader
