= Artur Jorge =

Artur Jorge may refer to:

- Artur Jorge (footballer, born 1946), full name Artur Jorge Braga Melo Teixeira, Portuguese football forward and manager
- Artur Jorge (footballer, born 1972), full name Artur Jorge Torres Gomes Araújo Amorim, Portuguese football defender and manager
- Artur Jorge (footballer, born 1994), full name Artur Jorge Marques Amorim, Portuguese football defender
- Tucka (born 1996), full name Artur Jorge dos Santos Soares, Portuguese football forward

== See also ==
- Arthur George (1915–2013), Australian lawyer and association football administrator
- Arthur Edward George (1875–1951), English soldier, engineer, businessman, and racing driver
- Artúr Görgei (1818–1916), Hungarian military leader
