= Arttu Likola =

Finnish ice hockey player

- Born: September 24, 1994 (age 30); Jyväskylä, Finland
- Height: 6 ft 1 in (185 cm)
- Weight: 187 lb (85 kg; 13 st 5 lb)
- Position: Left wing
- Shoots: Left
- Liiga team Former teams: SaiPa; JYP Jyväskylä; KeuPa HT
- Playing career: 2016–present

Arttu Likola (born September 24, 1994) is a Finnish ice hockey player who plays as a left winger for SaiPa on loan from JYP Jyväskylä.

== Career statistics ==
			Regular season					Playoffs
Season	Team	League	GP	G	A	Pts	PIM	GP	G	A	Pts	PIM
2009–10	JYP Jyväskylä U16	U16 SM-sarja Q	7	0	1	1	2	—	—	—	—	—
2009–10	JYP Jyväskylä U16	U16 SM-sarja	19	3	0	3	8	3	0	0	0	0
2010–11	JYP Jyväskylä U17	U17 Jr. B2 SM-sarja Q	6	1	1	2	4	—	—	—	—	—
2010–11	JYP Jyväskylä U17	U17 SM-sarja	20	20	17	37	14	2	0	1	1	2
2011–12	JYP Jyväskylä U18	U18 SM-sarja Q	9	2	3	5	6	—	—	—	—	—
2011–12	JYP Jyväskylä U18	U18 SM-sarja	31	15	12	27	16	—	—	—	—	—
2011–12	JYP Jyväskylä U20	U20 SM-liiga	4	0	0	0	0	—	—	—	—	—
2012–13	JYP Jyväskylä U20	U20 SM-liiga	45	14	15	29	14	6	1	2	3	6
2013–14	JYP Jyväskylä U20	U20 SM-liiga	37	14	20	34	18	—	—	—	—	—
2013–14	JYP-Akatemia	Mestis	5	0	2	2	2	—	—	—	—	—
2014–15	JYP Jyväskylä U20	U20 SM-liiga	18	4	9	13	14	—	—	—	—	—
2014–15	JYP-Akatemia	Mestis	25	2	3	5	10	3	0	0	0	2
2015–16	JYP-Akatemia	Mestis	49	10	13	23	20	—	—	—	—	—
2016–17	JYP Jyväskylä	Liiga	21	3	2	5	0	7	0	0	0	2
2016–17	JYP-Akatemia	Mestis	30	14	14	28	10	—	—	—	—	—
2017–18	JYP Jyväskylä	Liiga	19	0	1	1	6	—	—	—	—	—
2017–18	KeuPa HT	Mestis	10	3	4	7	2	—	—	—	—	—
2017–18	SaiPa	Liiga	3	1	0	1	0	4	0	0	0	2
2018–19	KeuPa HT	Mestis	13	2	3	5	6	—	—	—	—	—
2020–21	Pelikaanit	2. Divisioona	10	11	6	17	6	—	—	—	—	—
Liiga totals			43	4	3	7	6	11	0	0	0	4
Mestis totals			132	31	39	70	50	3	0	0	0	2
