= Arturo Paoli =

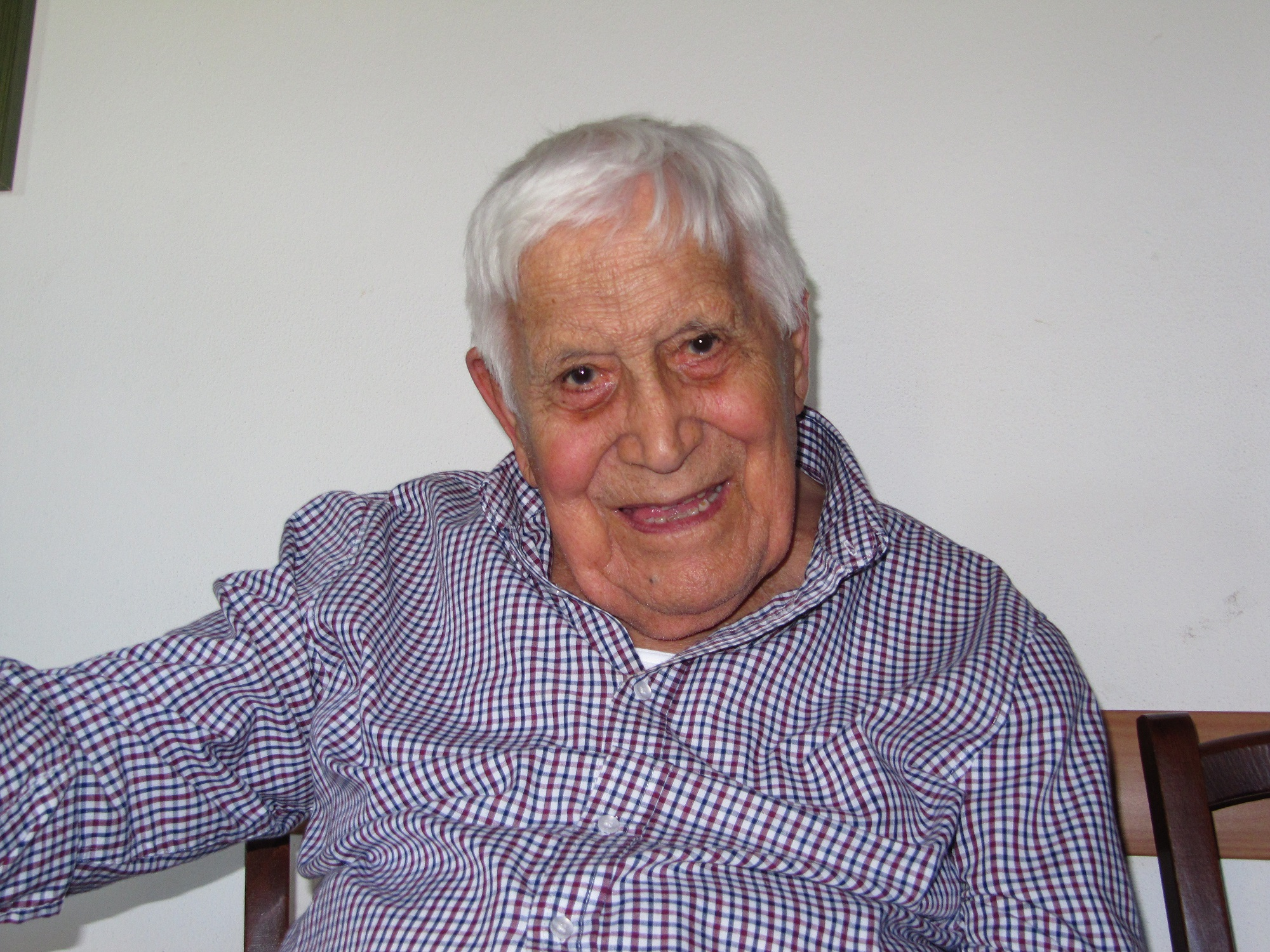
Paoli in 2012

Arturo Paoli (30 November 1912 – 13 July 2015) was an Italian priest and missionary. He was a member of the Little Brothers of the Gospel congregation. Paoli helped save Jewish Italians during World War II. He was born in Lucca, Italy.

Paoli died of natural causes in Lucca, Italy, aged 102.
