= Carlos Prieto (cellist) =

Mexican cellist (born 1937)

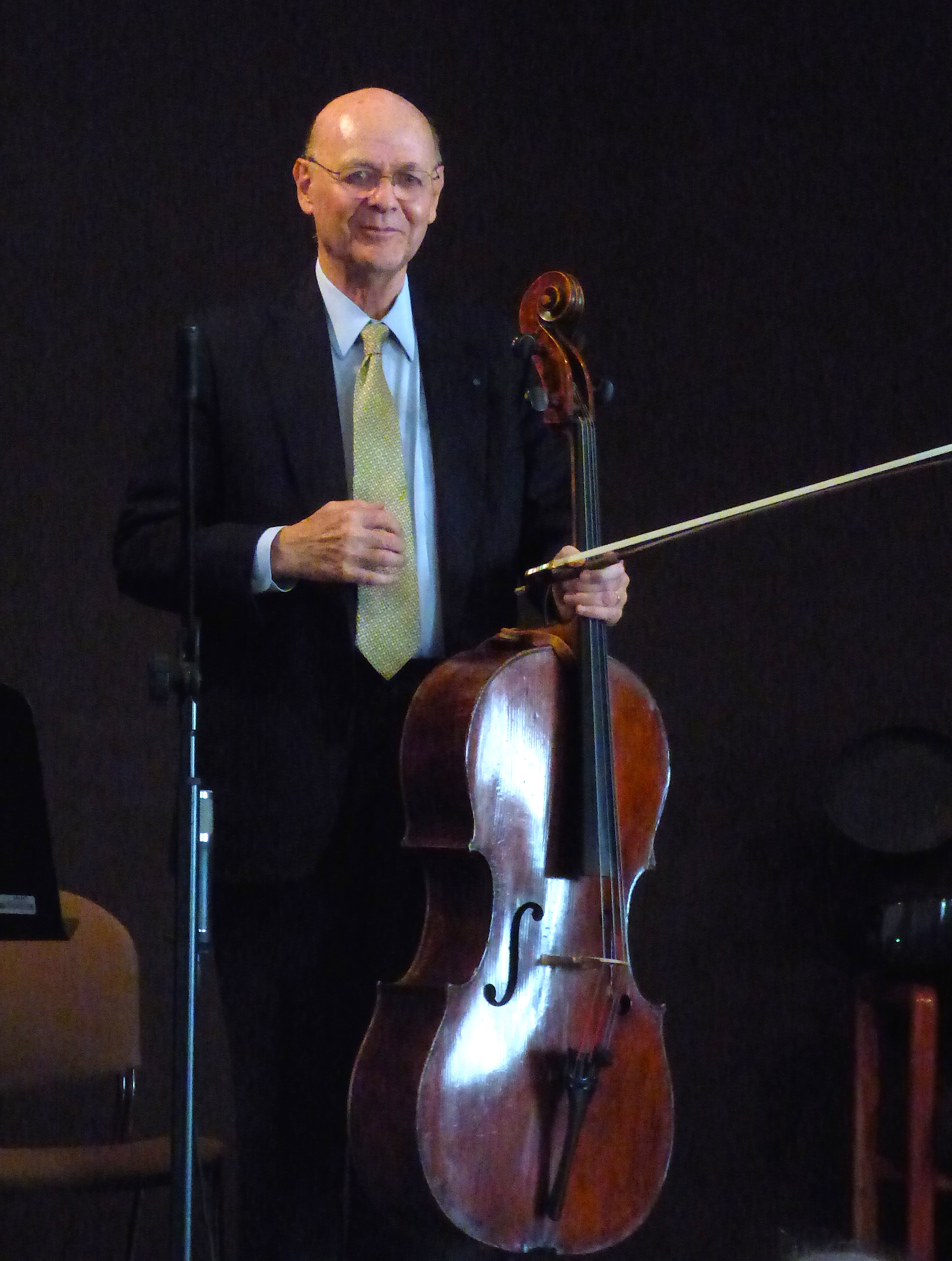
- Carlos Prieto in 2014

Background information
- Born: January 1, 1937 (age 89)
- Origin: Mexico City, Mexico
- Genre: Classical
- Occupations: cellist writer and academic

Carlos Prieto (January 1, 1937) is a Mexican cellist and writer, born in Mexico City. He has received enthusiastic public acclaim and won excellent reviews for his performances throughout the United States, Europe, Russia and the former Soviet Union, Asia, and Latin America. The New York Times review of his Carnegie Hall debut raved, "Prieto knows no technical limitations and his musical instincts are impeccable."

He plays a Stradivarius cello named the "Piatti" after Carlo Alfredo Piatti, affectionately nicknamed "Chelo Prieto" by the current owner. He is a promoter of contemporary, original classical instrument music by Latin American composers. The Carlos Prieto International Cello Competition is held every three years in Mexico. His son, Carlos Miguel Prieto, is music director of the National Symphony Orchestra of Mexico.

== Early years ==
Prieto began playing the cello at age four, studying under the instruction of Hungarian cellist Imre Hartman, and also with the Mexican cellist Manuel Garnica Fierro.

Prieto was a longtime friend of Igor Stravinsky. When Stravinsky returned to Russia in 1962 after a fifty-year absence, he was accompanied in Moscow by Prieto, who was at that time studying at the Moscow State University in Russia. He also knew Shostakovich and has premiered his first Cello Concerto in different cities in Mexico as well as in Spain. Prieto experienced the Cuban Missile Crisis while he was in Moscow in 1962, where he observed first-hand the information vacuum that was part of everyday life in the Soviet Union. He wrote in his memoir that he did not know what was going on until it was all over.

He continued his instruction with Pierre Fournier in Geneva and Leonard Rose in New York. He also studied engineering and economics at the Massachusetts Institute of Technology (MIT), MIT later appointed him in 1993 as a member of its department of music and theater arts visiting committee.

== Music career ==
He has played with orchestras from all over the world, the Royal Philharmonic in London, the Chamber Orchestra of the European Union, the American Symphony Orchestra in New York, the Boston Pops in Symphony Hall, the Berlin Symphony Orchestra, the Moscow Chamber Orchestra, the St. Petersburg Chamber Orchestra, the Spanish National Orchestra, the Spanish Radio, and Television Orchestra, the Irish National Orchestra, the MAV Budapest Orchestra, and many others. He has been invited to many of the world's most prestigious halls, such as Carnegie Hall and Lincoln Center in New York, Kennedy Center in Washington; Dorothy Chandler Pavilion in Los Angeles; Roy Thomson in Toronto; Barbican Hall and Wigmore Hall in London; Salle Gaveau and Salle Pleyel in Paris; Philharmonic Hall in St. Petersburg, Russia; Auditorio Nacional in Madrid; The Beijing and Shanghai Concert Halls; the Europalia, Granada, Berlin Festivals, etc.

He was appointed Honorary Member of the Fine Arts Advisory Council of the University of Texas at Austin.

From 1995 to 2010, he was chairman of the Foundation of the Conservatory of Las Rosas, the oldest conservatory of the Americas and Mexico's most ambitious music education project.

Every three years, the National Council for the Arts of Mexico and the Las Rosas Conservatory organize the Carlos Prieto International Cello Competition, so named in recognition of his career and work in promoting and enriching Latin American cello music.

In recent years, he played a series of concerts with Yo-Yo Ma in Mexico, Caracas, New Orleans, Chicago, Spain and Cuba.

== Writing career ==
Prieto has recorded over 100 works and written ten books: Russian Letters, Around the World with the Cello, From the USSR to Russia, The Adventures of a Cello –translated into Portuguese, Russian, and English- Paths and Images of Music, Five Thousand Years of Words (with a foreword by Carlos Fuentes); Throughout China with the Cello with a foreword by Yo-Yo Ma; Dmitri Shostakovich, genius and drama; Short history of music in Mexico, and My musical tours around the world. Music in Mexico and autobiographical notes. Some have been translated into English, Russian and Portuguese and have appeared in audiobook form.

In 2011, he was elected to the Mexican Academy of Language. In 2012, he was elected an honorary member of the Ecuadorian Academy of Language and, in 2016, of the Chilean Academy of Language.

== Discography ==
Espejos (Mirrors)

- Ernesto Halffter. Canzona e Pastorella
- Tomás Marco. Primer Espejo de Falla
- Mario Lavista. Tres Danzas Seculares
- J. Gutiérrez Heras. Canción en el Puerto
- Manuel Castillo. Alborada
- Rodolfo Halffter. Sonata

(urtext digital classics jbcc 015)

Le Grand Tango

- Le Grand Tango
- Piazzolla. Le Grand tango
- Piazzolla. Milonga
- Piazzolla. Michelangelo 70
- Piazzolla. Balada para mi Muerte
- Ginastera. Triste para cello y piano
- Villa-Lobos. Aria de Bachianas Brasileiras no. 5
- Federico Ibarra. Sonata
- Robert R. Rodríguez. Lull-A- Bear
- Manuel Enríquez. Fantasía

(urtext digital classics jbcc 014)

Dmitri Shostakovich. Sonatas

- Sonata op. 40
- Sonata op. 147 (transcrita por Carlos Prieto)

(urtext digital classics jbcc 123)

Conciertos y Chôro

- Camargo Guarnieri. Chôro for cello and orchestra
- Federico Ibarra. Concierto for cello and orchestra
- Carlos Chávez. Concierto for cello and orchestra

(urtext digital classics jbcc 023)

Azul y Verde (Blue and Green)

- Ginastera (Argentina) Pampeana
- (Uruguay) Piece for cello and piano
- Ricardo Lorenz (Venezuela) Cecilia en Azul y Verde
- (Venezuela) Golpe con Fandango
- Becerra Schmidt. (Chile) Sonata No. 5 for cello and piano
- Celso Garrido-Lecca (Perú). Soliloquio
- Joaquín Nin(España): Suite Española

(urtext digital classics jbcc 024)

Aprietos

- Samuel Zyman (México) Suite for two cellos (1999)
- Claudia Calderón (Colombia) La Revuelta Circular (2000)
- Xavier Montsalvatge (España) Invención a la Italiana (2000)
- Juan Orrego Salas (Chile). Espacios. Rapsodia (1998)
- Alberto Villalpando (Bolivia) Sonatita de Piel Morena (1999)
- Tomás Marco (España). Partita a Piatti (1999)

(urtext digital classics jbcc 045)

Tres siglos: tres obras para violonchelo y orquesta

- Ricardo Castro. Concerto for cello and orchestra (ca. 1895)
- Berlin Symphonic Orchestra. Jorge Velazco, director
- Samuel Zyman. Concerto for cello and orchestra (1990)
- Orquesta Sinfónica Nacional, Enrique Diemecke, director
- Joaquín Gutiérrez Heras. Fantasía Concertante para cello y orquesta (2005)
- Orquesta Sinfónica de Xalapa. Carlos Miguel Prieto, director

(urtext digital classics jbcc 178)

Tres conciertos para cello y orquesta

- Dmitri Shostakovich. Concerto in E-flat major, op. 107
- Celso Garrido-Lecca (Perú) Concerto for cello and orchestra
- John Kinsella. Concerto for cello and orchestra. 2000

(urtext digital classics jbcc 083)

Sonatas y danzas de México

- Manuel M. Ponce. Three preludes for cello and piano
- Sonata en sol menor para violonchelo y piano
- Alfonso de Elías. Chanson Triste.
- Miguel Bernal Jiménez. Tres Danzas Tarascas (transcritas por Manuel Enríquez)
- Silvestre Revueltas. Tres Piezas (transcritas por Manuel Enríquez
- Manuel Enríquez. Sonatina para violonchelo solo
- Manuel Enríquez. Four pieces for cello and piano

(urtext digital classics jbcc 033)

Del barroco y del romanticismo al siglo XXI

- Haendel-Halvorsen. Passacaglia for violin and cello
- Tchaikovsky. Pezzo capriccioso for cello and piano
- Rajmaninov. Vocalise, op. 34, No. 14 for cello and piano
- Chopin-Feuermann. Introduction et Polonaise Brillante para cello y piano
- Lukas Foss. Capriccio for cello and piano
- Francisco Mignone (Brasil). Modinha for cello and piano
- Ernst Mahle (Brasil). Ocho Duos Modales for two cellos
- Marlos Nobre (Brasil). Partita Latina for cello and piano. (world premiere)
- Eugenio Toussaint (México). Pour les Enfants. (world premiere)

(urtext digital classics jbcc 093)

From Bach to Piazzolla

- Bach: Courante de suite No. 6 en re mayor
- Rajmaninov Vocalise op. 34
- Tchaikovsky Pezzo Capriccioso, op. 62
- Falla Tres movimientos de la Suite Popular Española
- Gutiérrez Heras. Canción en el Puerto
- Piazzolla; Dos tangos: Le Grand Tango; Michelangelo 70
- Piazzolla Milonga
- Samuel Zyman. Dos movimientos de la Suite para dos violonchelos
- Shostakovich. Allegretto de Concierto, Op. 107

(urtext digital classics jbcc 101)

Seven world premieres

- DONALD GRANTHAM. Son of Cimetière para cello y piano. (2006)
- EUGENIO TOUSSAINT. Bachriación. Estudio Bop No. 7 para cello solo (2005)
- Russell Pinkston. Summer Rhapsody para cello and piano (2006)
- Dan Welcher. Arietta para cello y piano (2006)
- Robert X. Rodriguez. Tentado por la Samba para cello y piano.
- Samuel Zyman. Suite para cello solo (2007)
- Roberto SIERRA. Sonata Elegiaca para cello y piano (2006)

(urtext digital classics jbcc 183)

Bach vol. I

- The Suites for cello solo. Suites Nos. 1, 2 y 3

(PMG CLASSICS DIGITAL 092104)

Bach vol. II

- The Suites for cello solo. Suites Nos. 4, 5 y 6

PMG CLASSICS DIGITAL 092106)

Sonatas y Fantasías

- Gerhard. Sonata
- Ginastera. Sonata
- Zyman. Fantasía (dedicado a Carlos Prieto)
- Cassadó. Sonata al estilo antiguo español
- Rodrigo. Siciliana
- Piazzolla. Three brief pieces

(urtext digital classics jbcc 017)

Conciertos para el fin del milenio

- Eugenio Toussaint. Concierto No. 2
- Arturo Márquez. Mirrors in the sand
- Roberto Sierra. Four verses

(urtext digital classics jbcc 047)

== Published works ==
=== Spanish ===
- Russian Letters (1965)
- Around the World with the Cello Alianza Editorial México. (1987, 1988)
- From the USSR to Russia, foreword Isabel Turrent. Fondo de Cultura Económica (1993, 2013)
- The Adventures of a Cello –translated into Portuguese, Russian, and English- foreword Álvaro Mutis. Fondo de Cultura Económica. (1998, 2013)
- “Paths and Images of Music”, Photographs by Miguel Morales (1999)
- Five Thousand Years of Words with a foreword by Carlos Fuentes, Fondo de Cultura Económica. (2005)
- Throughout China with the Cello, with a foreword by Yo-Yo Ma, Fondo de Cultura Económica. (2009)
- Dmitri Shostakovich, genius and drama, with a foreword byJorge Volpi. Fondo de Cultura Económica. (2013)
- “Short history of music in Mexico”, Seminario de Cultura Mexicana (2013)
- My musical tours around the world. Music in Mexico and autobiographical notes with a foreword by Yo-Yo Ma, Fondo de Cultura Económica, 2017

=== English ===
- The Adventures of a Cello – Prologue Yo-Yo Ma. Texas University Press (2006)
- The Adventures of a Cello, Revised edition. Prologue Yo-Yo Ma. Texas University Press (2011)

=== Portuguese ===
- As aventuras de um violoncelo. Historias e memórias – Top Books and Univer Cidade. Rio de Janeiro. Brazil. (2006)

=== Russian ===
- Prikliucheniya Violonceli. – Editorial Orenburgskaya Kniga. Perm. Rusia. (2005)

== Awards ==
- 1995: Mozart Medal from the Austrian Ambassador in Mexico
- 1999: Achievement Award of the Mexican Cultural Institute of New York
- 1999: France awarded the Order of the Arts and Letters in the grade of Officer
- 2001: Indiana University awarded the Eva Janzer Award, entitled “Chevalier du Violoncelle”
- 2002: School of Music of Yale University awarded the Cultural Leadership Citation
- 2006: The Order of Merit, awarded by the King of Spain.
- 2006 The title of Venezuelan Youth Emeritus Master granted by José Antonio Abreu, President of the Foundation for the National Network of Youth and Children Orchestras of Venezuela (FESNOJIV).
- 2007: The National Prize for Arts and Sciences, given by the President of Mexico.
- 2008: The Pushkin Medal, awarded by the President of Russia.
- 2009: Professional Accomplishment Award by the University of Oviedo (Spain) and (ASICOM).
- 2012: The Commendation for Distinguished Leadership in the Arts awarded by TCU (Texas Christian University).
- 2012: The Fine Arts Gold Medal, awarded by the government of Mexico.
- 2014: The Robert A. Muh Award from the Massachusetts Institute of Technology (MIT) for outstanding contributions in the Humanities, Arts and Social Sciences.
- 2018- ''Embajador Gilberto Bosques'' Award in recognition of his exceptional careers and contributions to the cultures of their countries.
- 2018- The Harold Gramatges Honorary Award given by the Union of Writers and Artists of Cuba.
