= Luis Monguió =

Luis Monguió Primatesta (born June 25, 1908, in Tarragona, Spain; died July 10, 2005, in Clifton Park, New York) was an American Hispanist, professor of Spanish, and department head at the University of California-Berkeley.

== Life and work ==
Monguió studied law and philology in Barcelona and Madrid. From 1930 to 1938 he was in the Spanish diplomatic service in Valparaíso, Chile, and in French Morocco. He participated, on the Republican side, in the Battle of the Ebro (1938) in the Spanish Civil War. In 1939 he went with his American wife Helen Arnett de Monguió (†1977) to the United States, and studied Hispanic literature in Berkeley under de:Arturo Torres Rioseco (M.A., 1941). In 1942 he enlisted in the United States Army, and remarked that he was one of very few who participated in both the Battle of the Ebro and the Battle of the Bulge. In 1944 he became a U.S. citizen. From 1941 to 1942 and from 1946 until 1957 he taught Romance languages at Mills College. From 1957 to 1975, when he retired, he was a professor at the University of California, Berkeley, and from 1965 to 1968 was chairman of the Spanish and Portuguese Department. In 1980 he married his second wife, Alicia Colombí de Monguió, herself an important scholar on Spanish colonial literature. His final years followed her moves: Bennington College, University of Arizona, and finally University at Albany, where she ended her career as Distinguished Professor. Luis's final years were spent in the Albany area. He continued teaching until 1994, at both Bennington and the University at Albany.

Monguió's research was on colonial Spanish American literature, especially Peruvian.

Monguió received honorary doctorates from Mills College, University of Lima, as well as the Universidad Nacional Mayor de San Marcos in Lima (1971). He was académico correspondiente of the Academia Peruana de la Lengua. He received a Guggenheim Fellowship in 1952.

== Publications ==
- (Edited with Arturo Torres Ríoseco) Lector hispanoamericano, Boston 1944
- César Vallejo (1892-1938). Vida y obra. Bibliografía. Antología, Lima 1952
- La poesía postmodernista peruana, Mexico 1954
- Estudios sobre literatura hispanoamericana y española, Mexico 1958
- Sobre un escritor elogiado por Cervantes. Los versos del perulero Enrique Garcés y sus amigos 1591, Berkeley 1960
- Don José Joaquín de Mora y el Perú del ochocientos, Berkeley 1967
- Notas y estudios de literatura peruana y americana, Mexico 1972
- (Ed.) Poesías de don Felipe Pardo y Aliaga, Berkeley 1973

== Bibliography ==
- Homenaje a don Luis Monguió, ed. Jordi Aladro-Font, Newark, Delaware, Juan de la Cuesta, 1997.
- Cacchione Amendola, Richard (2006), "Luis Monguió (1908-2005). Bio-bibliografía de un distinguido peruanista e hispanoamericanista", Boletín de la Academia Peruana de la Lengua, vol. 42, pp. 237–295
- "Luis Monguió (obituary)". Albany Times-Union. July 12, 2005.
