= Orquesta Sinfónica del Estado de México =

Symphony orchestra

- Symphony orchestra
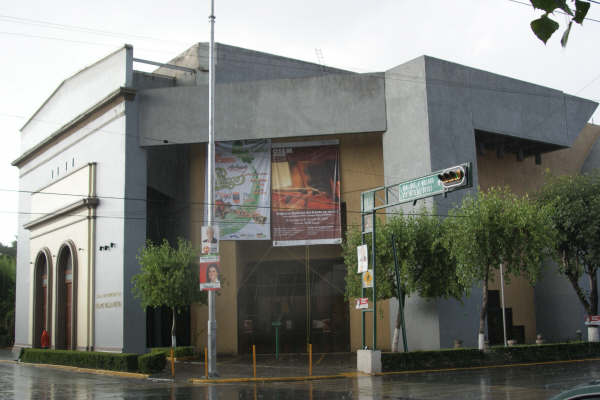
- Felipe Villanueva Room in Toluca
- Short name: OSEM
- Founded: 1971
- Location: José María Morelos and Pavón, Toluca
- Concert hall: Felipe Villanueva Room
- Website: osem.edomex.gob.mx

The Orquesta Sinfónica del Estado de México (OSEM) is the symphony orchestra of the State of Mexico. It was founded in 1971 and is based in Toluca, Mexico State, Mexico; its home hall is Sala Felipe Villanueva. It has toured in Europe, the United States, and China. They have released multiple recordings of classical music including the works of Mexican and Spanish composers.

== History ==
On August 27, 1971, under the initiative of Enrique Bátiz and the government of the State of Mexico, the Orquesta Sinfónica del Estado de México (OSEM) was founded. Its purpose is the spreading of music as an art, to create unity and identity among the citizens of the state. The orchestra is located in the city of Toluca, and its home hall is the Sala Felipe Villanueva. The Orchestra has been characterized by its endeavor to carry its message to all the municipalities of the state, to all corners of the country. It was also the first institution of its kind to visit the 16 political divisions of the Federal District. It began giving concerts in the main settings of the capital of the country, from the Bellas Artes theater and National Auditorium to the Sala Nezahualcóyotl, as well as other halls in the outlying areas, such as the San Benito Abad theater of the Centro Escolar del Lago, in the municipality of Cuautitlán, which, in spite of its location 40 kilometers from the center of the city, rose in popularity for the metropolitan public, due to the area and the admirable acoustic conditions and the comfort of the hall.

The OSEM performed at the Fourth Festival of the Historic Center of Campeche, and the following year at the Orchestral Festival organized by the National Council for Culture and Arts. For six years, the orchestra carried out a Festival in Valle de Bravo, in the state of Mexico, showing through it how excellent art can be when it is the result of a joint effort of the living forces of the country.

Between 1983 and 1985, the orchestra was under the direction of maestro Manuel Suárez, and later, until 1989, Eduardo Diazmuñoz.

== Tours ==
In 1975, the OSEM made its first tour to the United States, returning continuously for three years, starting in 1979, playing in the most important cities. In 2002, it toured for the first time in Germany.

In 2003, a European Tour led the orchestra to Spain, Poland, Germany, and France. In 2005, the orchestra traveled to Paris and performed two concerts, one in Salle Gaveau and the other in the Théâtre Mogador, with extraordinary success. In September 2005, the OSEM traveled to the People's Republic of China to perform six concerts in the most important cities of this country, including Changsha, Shanghai, Shenyang, Harbin, and Beijing.

In 2008 the OSEM was invited by Colombia Artists Management to play a 49-concert tour of the US lasting more than nine weeks. They performed across the US, including concerts in New York, Florida, Georgia, North Carolina, Ohio, Illinois, Iowa, California, and Nevada.

In 2010 the OSEM and Enrique Bátiz performed two concerts in Granada, Spain, which were broadcast live and recorded for DVD video release.

== Contributions to the performing community ==
The promotion of new musical talents has been an objective of the orchestra since its beginning. It has given rise to over forty soloists, and also participated in the discovery and encouragement of young performers, through the "International Henryk Szeryng Violin Contest", which began in 1992. In the four times this contest was held, the OSEM enjoyed the presence of the aspiring violinists of the world, and rewarded a dozen of them. The OSEM has also hosted many guest directors and soloists.

An accomplishment of the OSEM, assisted by the Trust Foundation, has been the institutionalization of the Festival Valle de Bravo year after year, since 1997. Concerts of this festival take place in the town in Valle de Bravo and in the theater of Bellas Artes in Mexico City.

== Recordings ==
The recordings of the OSEM cover the broadest range of any Mexican orchestra. They include recordings of the works of Giuseppe Verdi and Gioachino Rossini; Mexican and Spanish music; the works of Isaac Albéniz, Joaquín Rodrigo, Manuel M. Ponce, and Carlos Chávez; and the symphonies of Ludwig van Beethoven, Robert Schumann, Johannes Brahms, and Pyotr Ilyich Tchaikovsky.

== Awards ==
Both the orchestra and its artistic director have repeatedly received the Annual Award from the Mexican Union of Chroniclers of Theater and Music, given for its 25th anniversary by the First Festival of Classical Music in 1996 with the participation of other orchestras in the country, as well as for its promotion of musical activities in Mexico.
