= Enrique Bátiz =

Mexican conductor and concert pianist (1942–2025)

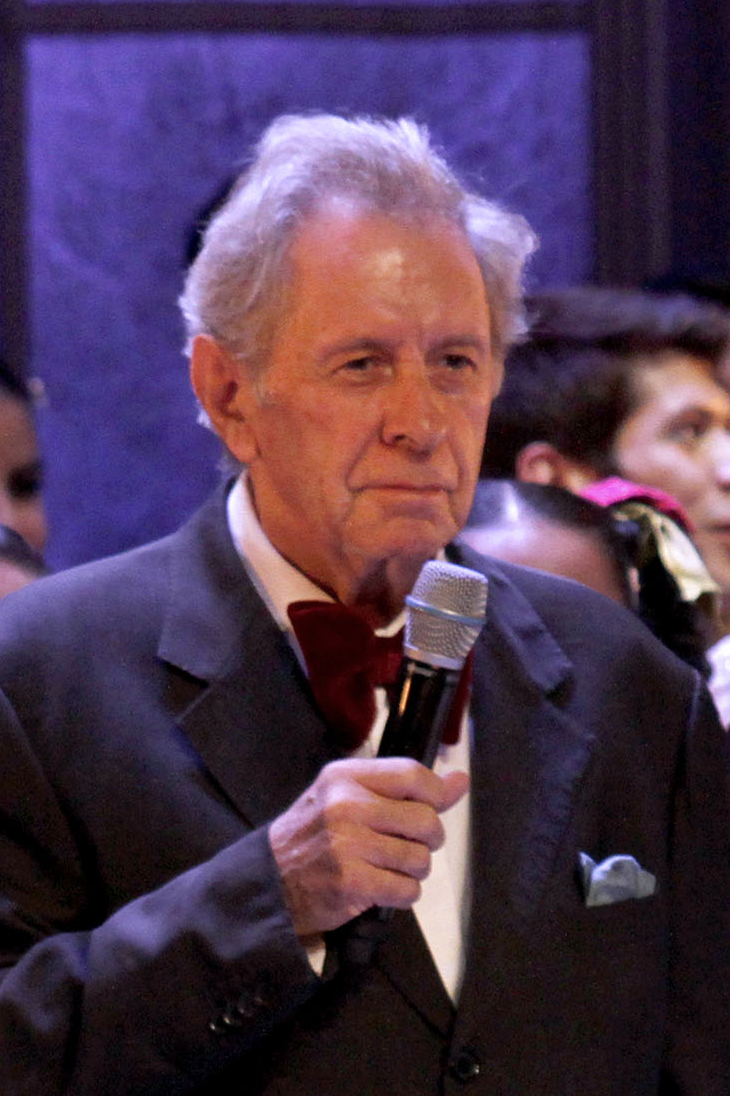
- Bátiz in 2019
- Born: 4 May 1942; Mexico City, Mexico
- Died: 30 March 2025 (aged 82)
- Occupations: Pianist; conductor
- Organizations: Orquesta Sinfónica del Estado de México; Mexico City Philharmonic Orchestra
- Awards: International Gold Mercury award; Mozart Medal (Mexico)

Enrique Bátiz Campbell (4 May 1942 – 30 March 2025) was a Mexican conductor and concert pianist. Trained as a pianist in Dallas, New York City and Warsaw, he focused on conducting from 1969. He co-founded the Orquesta Sinfónica del Estado de México in 1971 and conducted it until 2018, with a short interruption from 1983 to 1989 when he headed the Mexico City Philharmonic Orchestra. He made many recordings, of symphonies by Beethoven and Tchaikovsky as well as the complete orchestral works by Joaquín Rodrigo and music by Mexican composers.

== Life and career ==
Enrique Bátiz Campbell was born in Mexico City on 4 May 1942. He began piano lessons at age 8 with Francisco Agea, and continued 10 years later with György Sándor. He began to study at the Southern Methodist University in Dallas and moved to the Juilliard School in New York City in 1965, where he became a student of Adele Marcus and also studied conducting. In 1964, he made several national tours as a pianist, and in 1965 was a semifinalist in the Marguerite Long International Piano Competition in Paris. A 1967 concert tour featured performances with the Łodz and Szczecin Philharmonics. From 1967 to 1970, he continued his piano studies in Poland at the Warsaw Conservatory with Zbigniew Drzewiecki, where he also studied conducting with Stanisław Wisłocki; he graduated there as a pianist.

Bátiz returned to Mexico in 1969, making his debut as a conductor in the Palacio de Bellas Artes with the Xalapa Symphony Orchestra. In 1970, he was a finalist in the Ferruccio Busoni International Piano Competition in Italy.

In April 1971, he was co-founder, director and conductor of the State of Mexico Symphony Orchestra (OSEM). He toured the United States with the orchestra in 1975, 1979, 1980, 1981 and 1984.

From 1983, he was music director of the Mexico City Philharmonic Orchestra until 1989. Outside of Mexico, Bátiz was named guest conductor of the Royal Philharmonic Orchestra in 1984, and conducted them in recordings. He was both guest conductor and musical advisor of the symphony orchestra of Guanajuato.

In 1990, he resumed his directorship of the OSEM. They toured in the United States in 2008 and in Europe and China several times. In 2018; Bátiz stood down as music director, nominally for health reasons related to Parkinson's disease.

He served as Artistic Director for the Orquesta Sinfónica de la Universidad Autonoma del Estado de Hidalgo from November 2022 until his death.

Batiz died on 30 March 2025, at the age of 82.

== Recordings ==
Batíz made some 145 recordings: As a pianist, Bátiz made a series of recordings for Polish and Salzburg broadcasters. In 1997, Bátiz and the OSEM recorded Tchaikovsky's six symphonies and other works, Schumann's four symphonies and the four symphonies by Brahms. He recorded for labels such as EMI International, ASV Records, Musical Heritage Society, Naxos, Pickwick, and RPO Records. He recorded with the Royal Philharmonic, Mexico City Philharmonic, the London Philharmonic Orchestra, the London Symphony, the Philharmonia, the Royal Liverpool Philharmonic, and Orchestra della Toscana. He recorded Beethoven's nine symphonies, and the complete orchestral music by Joaquín Rodrigo, music by Manuel M. Ponce and Georges Bizet, and eight volumes of Mexican music. He conducted the first digital recording of the Bachianas Brasileiras by Villa-Lobos.

== Awards ==
Throughout his career, Bátiz received numerous awards. These include the Presea Bernal in art from the State of Mexico Confederation of Professionals, Rome's International Gold Mercury award (the first given to a Latin American artist) and the Jose Marti and Tlatelolco's Eagle medals. The Mexican Union of Theatrical and Musical Broadcasters named him the most distinguished artist of the year four times (1971, 1981, 1983, and 1996). In 1986, Brazil awarded him the Rio Branco medal for making the first digital recording of the nine Bachianas Brasileiras by Villa-Lobos. In 1991, he received the Mozart medal given by the Domecq Cultural Institute. In 1994, because of his contribution to the musical culture of the State of Mexico and the musical world, he received the Sor Juana Ines de la Cruz award for Arts and Letters. In recognition of his achievements, he was declared Mexiquense Destacado (Outstanding Mexican).
