= Arturo Rodríguez Fernández =

Author

Arturo Rodríguez Fernández (1948 – April 16, 2010) was an author, film critic, and playwright.

Born in Santo Domingo, he attended high school in Spain, and went on to receive a law degree from National University Pedro Henríquez Ureña and from universities in Strasbourg, France and Italy. He has received over thirty national and international literary awards.

Rodríguez Fernández died of a cardiac arrest on April 16, 2010. At the time of his death, he was the Santo Domingo Ministry of Culture's Film Commissioner, produced a daily radio show covering cinema, and worked as a journalist for the newspaper Hoy.
