= 2025 Quebec municipal elections =

- November 2, 2025
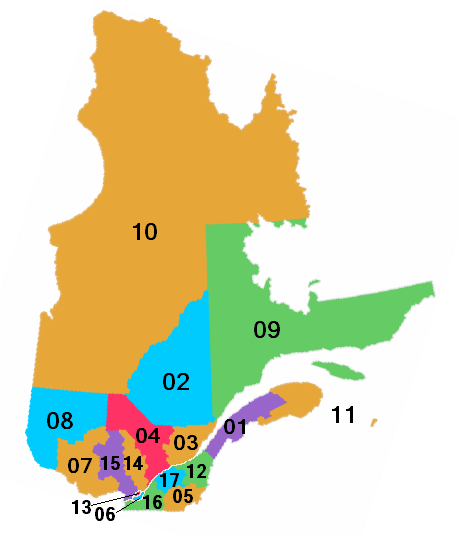

The 2025 municipal elections in Quebec were held on November 2, 2025. Under the Act respecting elections and referendums in municipalities, municipal general elections in all municipalities in the Canadian province of Quebec must be held every four years on the first Sunday of November.

Voters in the province of Quebec elected mayors, councillors, and all other elected officials in all of the province's municipalities.

== By municipality ==
- 2025 Gatineau municipal election
- 2025 Laval municipal election
- 2025 Lévis municipal election
- 2025 Longueuil municipal election
- 2025 Montreal municipal election
- 2025 Quebec City municipal election
- 2025 Saguenay municipal election
- 2025 Sherbrooke municipal election
- 2025 Trois-Rivières municipal election

== Bas-Saint-Laurent ==
=== Amqui ===
Mayoral candidate	Vote	%
Sylvie Blanchette (X)	Acclaimed	

=== La Pocatière ===
Mayoral candidate	Vote	%
Vincent Bérubé (X)	Acclaimed	

=== Matane ===
Mayoral candidate	Vote	%
Eddy Métivier (X)	Acclaimed	

=== Mont-Joli ===
Mayoral candidate	Vote	%
Martin Soucy (X)	Acclaimed	

=== Rimouski ===
Mayoral candidate	Vote	%
Guy Caron (X)	11,377	68.61
Sébastien Bolduc	4,635	27.95
Sébastien Cyr	571	3.44

==== Rimouski City Council ====
Candidate	Vote	%
Sacré-Coeur District (1)
Francis Chouinard	1,089	60.13
Claude Laroche	424	23.41
Lyse Perron	298	16.45
Nazareth District (2)
Patrick Dumont	794	51.83
Maxime Therrien	573	37.40
Daniel Paré	165	10.77
Saint-Germain District (3)
Élise Gagnon	562	39.94
Philippe Cousineau Morin (X)	560	39.80
Alain Caron	285	20.26
Rimouski-Est District (4)
Cécilia Michaud (X)	660	41.48
Marie Simoneau	639	40.16
Jean-Rock Côté	292	18.35
Pointe-au-Père District (5)
Julie Carré (X)	Acclaimed	
Sainte-Odile District (6)
Grégory Thorez (X)	939	52.69
Éric Avon	843	47.31
Saint-Robert District (7)
Jocelyn Pelletier (X)	834	61.01
Claire Dubé	533	38.99
Terrasse Arthur-Buies District (8)
Antoine Durette-Landry	770	44.28
Marc-Denis Rioux	682	39.22
Jacob Brûlé	287	16.50
Saint-Pie-X District (9)
Mélanie Bernier (X)	Acclaimed	
Sainte-Blandine et Mont-Lebel District (10)
Dave Dumas (X)	Acclaimed	
Le Bic District (11)
Alain Martineau	689	55.21
Mélanie Beaulieu (X)	559	44.79

=== Rivière-du-Loup ===
Mayoral candidate	Vote	%
Mario Bastille (X)	5,090	77.88
Christian Pelletier	1,446	22.12

=== Saint-Antonin ===
Mayoral candidate	Vote	%
Alain Castonguay		
Denis Fortin		
Bernard Pelletier		

=== Témiscouata-sur-le-Lac ===
Mayoral candidate	Vote	%
Christian St-Pierre	2,427	85.07
Ginette Bégin	426	14.93
Jean-Marc Beaudoin	Withdrew	

== Saguenay–Lac-Saint-Jean ==
=== Alma ===
Mayoral candidate	Vote	%
Sylvie Beaumont (X)	8,061	68.72
Sébastien Ouellet	3,436	29.29
Christian Collard	234	1.99

=== Dolbeau-Mistassini ===
Mayoral candidate	Vote	%
Rémi Rousseau	2,848	62.54
André Guy (X)	1,706	37.46

=== Roberval ===
Mayoral candidate	Vote	%
Jean-Francois Boily	2,531	66.59
Serge Bergeron (X)	1,270	33.41

=== Saint-Félicien ===
Mayoral candidate	Vote	%
Jean-Philippe Boutin	4,394	88.29
Louise Boulanger	583	11.71

=== Saint-Honoré ===
Mayoral candidate	Vote	%
Lucien Villeneuve	1,445	51.57
Valérie Roy	1,156	41.26
Régent Pelletier	201	7.17

== Capitale-Nationale ==
=== Baie-Saint-Paul ===
Mayoral candidate	Vote	%
Michaël Pilote (X)	Acclaimed	

=== Boischatel ===
Party	Mayoral candidate	Vote	%
Option Boischatel	Benoit Bouchard (X)	2,452	74.21
Voix citoyenne	Christian Beaubien	852	25.79

=== Donnacona ===
Mayoral candidate	Vote	%
Jean-Claude Léveillée (X)	Acclaimed	

=== Lac-Beauport ===
Party	Mayoral candidate	Vote	%
Équipe Lucie LaRoche	Lucie Laroche	2,053	58.91
Équipe François Boily	François Boily (X)	1,432	41.09

=== L'Ancienne-Lorette ===
Party	Mayoral candidate	Vote	%
Fierté lorettaine - Gaétan Pageau	Gaétan Pageau (X)	6,027	84.95
La voix des Lorettains	Alain Fortin	1,068	15.05

=== La Malbaie ===
Mayoral candidate	Vote	%
Michel Couturier (X)	Acclaimed	

=== Pont-Rouge ===
Mayoral candidate	Vote	%
Dany Bisson	2,794	71.29
Mario Dupont (X)	1,125	28.71

=== Saint-Augustin-de-Desmaures ===
Mayoral candidate	Vote	%
Sylvain Juneau (X)	7,640	81.04
Pascale Bertrand	1,788	18.96

=== Saint-Raymond ===
Mayoral candidate	Vote	%
Claude Duplain (X)	2,830	81.79
Philippe Brasseur	630	18.21

=== Sainte-Brigitte-de-Laval ===
Mayoral candidate	Vote	%
Mathieu Thomassin	2,307	72.48
Alain Lachance	876	27.52

=== Sainte-Catherine-de-la-Jacques-Cartier ===
Mayoral candidate	Vote	%
Mathieu Roberge	1,295	56.92
Pierre Dolbec (X)	980	43.08

=== Shannon ===
Mayoral candidate	Vote	%
Sarah Perreault (X)	Acclaimed	

=== Stoneham-et-Tewkesbury ===
Party	Mayoral candidate	Vote	%
Équipe Sébastien Couture	Sébastien Couture (X)	Acclaimed	

== Mauricie ==
=== La Tuque ===
Mayoral candidate	Vote	%
Pierre Pacarar	3,109	76.46
Normand Beaudoin	957	23.54

=== Louiseville ===
Mayoral candidate	Vote	%
Yvon Deshaies (X)	1,903	64.66
Michel Lachance	1,008	34.25
Daniel Ringuette	32	1.09

=== Notre-Dame-du-Mont-Carmel ===
Mayoral candidate	Vote	%
Luc Dostaler (X)	Acclaimed	

=== Saint-Boniface ===
Mayoral candidate	Vote	%
Alain Gélinas	1,149	56.30
Jonathan Radzvicia	892	43.70

=== Shawinigan ===
Mayoral candidate	Vote	%
Yves Lévesque	10,816	52.75
Jacinthe Campagna	6,244	30.45
Luc Trudel	3,443	16.79

==== Shawinigan City Council ====
Candidate	Vote	%
Des Piles-Du Rocher (1)
Marc Bélisle	880	42.84
Nancy Déziel (X)	833	40.56
Jean-François Lampron	341	16.60
Saint-Georges (2)
Louis-Jean Garceau (X)	2,023	90.47
Gilles Vallerand	213	9.53
Almaville-Lac-à-la-Tortue (3)
Maricka Giguère	876	44.72
Alexandre Houle Adam	600	30.63
Charlot Pagé	427	21.80
Etienne Ntobe	56	2.86
Val-Mauricie (4)
Josette Allard-Gignac (X)	1,376	63.03
Pierre Bordeleau	541	24.78
Christian Béland	266	12.19
Saint-Michel (5)
Jacques St-Louis	1,084	51.20
Benny Auger	732	34.58
Samuel Vallée	301	14.22
Saint-Gérard-Belgoville (6)
Lynn Gravel	1,516	61.43
Christian Hould (X)	952	38.57
Sainte-Flore-Grand-Mère (7)
Anthony Lafrenière-Gélinas	1,784	82.14
Sylvie Paquin	388	17.86
Des Hêtres-Frank-Gauthier (8)
Marie-Josée Suzor	1,092	63.12
Donald Michaud	638	36.88
Trudel-Hubert-Biermans (9)
Jean-Yves Tremblay (X)	709	37.59
Gabriel Sansoucy	631	33.46
Etienne Hamel	546	28.95
Centre-ville-Saint-Marc (10)
Caroline Walker	510	35.25
Timothée Langlois	285	19.70
Mathieu Richard	244	16.86
Vincent Mercier	239	16.52
Pierre Vanasse	169	11.68

== Estrie ==
=== Bromont ===
Party	Mayoral candidate	Vote	%
Demain Bromont	Michelle Champagne	2,548	43.50
Independent	Tatiana Contreras (X)	1,710	29.20
Independent	Réal Brunelle	1,599	27.30

=== Coaticook ===
Mayoral candidate	Vote	%
Simon Madore (X)	Acclaimed	

=== Cookshire-Eaton ===
Mayoral candidate	Vote	%
Daphné Raymond	725	54.59
Marc Turcotte	603	45.41
Michel Mercier	Withdrew	

=== Cowansville ===
Mayoral candidate	Vote	%
Sylvie Beauregard (X)	Acclaimed	

=== Farnham ===
Mayoral candidate	Vote	%
Patrick Melchior (X)	Acclaimed	

=== Granby ===
==== Mayor ====
Mayoral candidate	Vote	%
Julie Bourdon (X)	18,371	96.83
Jaouad El Kaabi	602	3.17

==== Granby City Council ====
Candidate	Vote	%
District 1
Stéphane Giard (X)	Acclaimed	
District 2
Paul Goulet (X)	2,469	91.17
Kosta Digaletos	239	8.83
District 3
François Lemay (X)	1,758	76.67
Pascal Plante	535	23.33
District 4
Geneviève Rheault (X)	1,624	77.96
Alexandre Grondin	459	22.04
District 5
Alain Lacasse (X)	Acclaimed	
District 6
Denyse Tremblay (X)	924	52.47
François Fortier	837	47.53
District 7
Sophie Séguin	635	45.95
Elise Racine	382	27.64
Mélanie Huard	264	19.10
Renald Perreault	59	4.27
Caroline Ngoufack Kenfack	42	3.04
District 8
Félix Dionne (X)	1,036	68.16
Victoire Marie Collard	484	31.84
District 9
Cédrick Beauregard	1,082	57.31
Pierre Forand	410	21.72
Steve Vincent	396	20.97
District 10
Catherine Baudin (X)	1,542	72.19
Claudelle Foisy	472	22.10
Constantin Abadji	61	2.86
Ginette Langlois	61	2.86

=== Lac-Brome ===
Mayoral candidate	Vote	%
Lee Patterson	1,086	36.28
Benoît G. Bourgon	914	30.54
Shelley Judge	754	25.19
Alan R. Gauthier	239	7.99

=== Lac-Mégantic ===
Mayoral candidate	Vote	%
Julie Morin (X)	Acclaimed	

=== Magog ===
Mayoral candidate	Vote	%
Nathalie Pelletier (X)	Acclaimed	

=== Orford ===
Mayoral candidate	Vote	%
Alain Brisson	Acclaimed	

=== Shefford ===
Mayoral candidate	Vote	%
Éric Chagnon (X)	1,431	87.85
Sylvain Audet	198	12.15

=== Val-des-Sources ===
Mayoral candidate	Vote	%
Hugues Grimard (X)	Acclaimed	

=== Waterloo ===
Mayoral candidate	Vote	%
Alexandre Ackaoui Asselin		
Rémi Raymond		
Pascal Russell		

=== Windsor ===
Mayoral candidate	Vote	%
Gaétan Graveline	Acclaimed	

== Montreal ==
=== Beaconsfield ===
Mayoral candidate	Vote	%
Martin St-Jean	2,593	46.44
Gregory Orleski	1,861	33.33
Frank Merhar	973	17.42
Nicole Corrado	157	2.81

=== Côte-Saint-Luc ===
Party	Mayoral candidate	Vote	%
Équipe / Team CSL	David Tordjman	4,241	50.04
Independent	Mitchell Brownstein (X)	4,234	49.96

=== Dollard-des-Ormeaux ===
Mayoral candidate	Vote	%
Alex Bottausci (X)	Acclaimed	

==== Dollard-des-Ormeaux City Council ====
Candidate	Vote	%
District 1
Laurence Parent (X)	967	95.46
Mohammad Nadi Senejani	46	4.54
District 2
Errol Johnson (X)	Acclaimed	
District 3
Sandy Jesion	515	61.16
Leslie Greenberg	236	28.03
Jonathan Gray	91	10.81
District 4
Tanya Toledano (X)	926	82.53
Anna Bobrovskaya	196	17.47
District 5
Morris Vesely (X)	796	57.98
Amenda Sehgal	533	38.82
Richard Zilversmit	44	3.20
District 6
Valérie Assouline (X)	Acclaimed	
District 7
Pulkit Kantawala	772	49.97
Ryan Brownstein (X)	723	46.80
Elyes Sahli	50	3.24
District 8
Anastasia Assimakopoulos (X)	891	92.43
Zachary Halpert	73	7.57

=== Dorval ===
Party	Mayoral candidate	Vote	%
Équipe Action Dorval Action Team	Marc Doret (X)	2,959	51.95
Démocratie Dorval Democracy	Umberto Macri	2,737	48.05

=== Hampstead ===
Mayoral candidate	Vote	%
Jeremy Levi (X)	918	40.91
Jack Edery	892	39.75
William Steinberg	434	19.34

=== Kirkland ===
Mayoral candidate	Vote	%
Michel Gibson (X)	Acclaimed	

=== Montréal-Ouest ===
Mayoral candidate	Vote	%
Jonathan Cha	936	46.66
Beny Masella (X)	674	33.60
Franco Forlini	396	19.74

=== Mount Royal ===
Party	Mayoral candidate	Vote	%
Équipe Peter Malouf	Peter J. Malouf (X)	3,995	64.00
Avenir cité-jardin - Équipe Maryam	Maryam Kamali Nezhad	2,247	36.00

=== Pointe-Claire ===
Mayoral candidate	Vote	%
John Belvedere	4,698	41.47
Tim Thomas (X)	3,737	32.99
Brent Cowan	2,894	25.55

=== Sainte-Anne-de-Bellevue ===
Mayoral candidate	Vote	%
Michel Boudreault	1,052	56.32
Paola Hawa (X)	816	43.68

=== Westmount ===
Mayoral candidate	Vote	%
Michael Stern	2,554	40.01
Lynne Casgrain	2,144	33.58
Mary Gallery	1,686	26.41

== Outaouais ==
=== Cantley ===
Party	Mayoral candidate	Vote	%
Independent	Nathalie Bélisle	1,921	45.03
Independent	David Gomes (X)	996	23.35
Vision Cantley	Marc Villeneuve	782	18.33
Independent	Jean Bosco Citegetse	567	13.29

=== Chelsea ===
Mayoral candidate	Vote	%
Brian Nolan	2,107	62.26
Pierre Guénard (X)	1,277	37.74

=== L'Ange-Gardien ===
Mayoral candidate	Vote	%
Marc Louis-Seize (X)	Acclaimed	

=== La Pêche ===
Mayoral candidate	Vote	%
Guillaume Lamoureux (X)	Acclaimed	

=== Pontiac ===
Mayoral candidate	Vote	%
Roger Larose (X)	Acclaimed	

=== Val-des-Monts ===
Mayoral candidate	Vote	%
Joëlle Gauthier	1,649	56.59
Chantal Renaud	882	30.27
Eric Monette	383	13.14

== Abitibi-Témiscamingue ==
=== Amos ===
Mayoral candidate	Vote	%
Sébastien D'Astous (X)	2,450	75.90
Steve Tardif	621	19.24
Robert Audette	79	2.45
Keven Laurendeau-Adam	78	2.42
Richard Castonguay	Withdrew	

=== La Sarre ===
Mayoral candidate	Vote	%
Yves Dubé (X)	Acclaimed	

=== Macamic ===
Mayoral candidate	Vote	%
Tony Boudreau (X)		
Claude Nelson Morin		

=== Malartic ===
Mayoral candidate	Vote	%
Martin Ferron (X)		

=== Rouyn-Noranda ===
Mayoral candidate	Vote	%
Gilles Chapadeau	Acclaimed	
Sébastien Côté	Withdrew	

==== Rouyn-Noranda City Council ====
Noranda-Nord/Lac-Dufault District (1)
Party	Council candidate	Vote	%
Independent	Daniel Camden (X)	Acclaimed	
Rouyn-Noranda-Ouest District (2)
Party	Council candidate	Vote	%
Independent	Sylvie Turgeon (X)	699	67.08
Parti virage	Narcisse Njiki Beyaga	343	32.92
Rouyn-Sud District (3)
Party	Council candidate	Vote	%
Independent	Martine Rioux	440	60.27
Independent	Éric Girard	290	39.73
Centre-Ville District (4)
Party	Council candidate	Vote	%
Parti virage	Vicky Brazeau	156	38.14
Independent	Valérie Morin	136	33.25
Independent	Yves Gauthier	117	28.61
Noranda District (5)
Party	Council candidate	Vote	%
Parti virage	François Gagné	247	50.51
Independent	Réal Beauchamp (X)	242	49.49
de l'Université District (6)
Party	Council candidate	Vote	%
Independent	Louis Dallaire (X)	394	79.12
Independent	Chrislande Cerant	20.88	104
Granada District (7)
Party	Council candidate	Vote	%
Independent	Élisa-Maude Champagne	Acclaimed	
Marie-Victorin/du Sourire District (8)
Party	Council candidate	Vote	%
Independent	Piel Côté	552	56.10
Independent	Julie Brassard	218	22.15
Parti virage	Philippe Marquis	214	21.75
Évain District (9)
Party	Council candidate	Vote	%
Independent	Lyne Fortin	357	45.89
Independent	Gabriel Tremblay-Carter	308	39.59
Parti virage	Anne Falardeau	113	14.52
KéKéKo District (10)
Party	Council candidate	Vote	%
Independent	Éric Grenier	599	75.25
Parti virage	Joanie Duval	197	24.75
McWatters/Cadillac/Bellecombe District (11)
Party	Council candidate	Vote	%
Independent	Yvon Hurtubise	360	56.60
Independent	Anick Lavoie	276	43.40
Aiguebelle District (12)
Party	Council candidate	Vote	%
Independent	Stéphane Girard (X)	Acclaimed	

=== Senneterre ===
Mayoral candidate	Vote	%
Nathalie-Ann Pelchat (X)		

=== Val-d'Or ===
Mayoral candidate	Vote	%
Serge Allard	4,065	44.09
Benjamin Turcotte	4,007	43.46
Richard Boutin	1,147	12.44

== Côte-Nord ==
=== Baie-Comeau ===
Mayoral candidate	Vote	%
Michel Desbiens (X)	6,429	91.62
Mélanie Bernier Savard	357	5.09
Katia Gauthier Miville	231	3.29

=== Port-Cartier ===
Mayoral candidate	Vote	%
Danielle Beaupré	1,343	57.00
Alain Thibault (X)	835	35.44
Gilles Fournier	141	5.98
Gabriel Robert	37	1.57

=== Sept-Îles ===
Mayoral candidate	Vote	%
Benoit Méthot	3,594	50.08
Patrick Hudon	2,743	38.22
Guylaine Lejeune	839	11.69

== Nord-du-Québec ==
=== Chapais ===
Mayoral candidate	Vote	%
Jacques Fortin (X)	Acclaimed	

=== Chibougamau ===
Mayoral candidate	Vote	%
Nichèle Compartino	Acclaimed	

=== Lebel-sur-Quévillon ===
Mayoral candidate	Vote	%
Guy Lafrenière (X)	Acclaimed	

=== Matagami ===
Mayoral candidate	Vote	%
René Dubé (X)		
Mathieu Pedneault		

== Gaspésie–Îles-de-la-Madeleine ==
=== Carleton-sur-Mer ===
Mayoral candidate	Vote	%
Mathieu Lapointe (X)	Acclaimed	

=== Chandler ===
Mayoral candidate	Vote	%
Gilles Daraiche (X)	2,533	67.98
Dominique Giroux	1,193	33.02

=== Gaspé ===
Mayoral candidate	Vote	%
Daniel Côté (X)	Acclaimed	

=== Grande-Rivière ===
Mayoral candidate	Vote	%
Gino Cyr (X)		
Carol Moreau		

=== Les Îles-de-la-Madeleine ===
Mayoral candidate	Vote	%
Antonin Valiquette (X)	4,253	63.27
Chanie Thériault	2,469	36.73

=== New Richmond ===
Mayoral candidate	Vote	%
Éric Dubé (X)	Acclaimed	

=== Sainte-Anne-des-Monts ===
Mayoral candidate	Vote	%
Simon Deschênes (X)	Acclaimed	

== Chaudière-Appalaches ==
=== Beauceville ===
Mayoral candidate	Vote	%
Patrick Mathieu	1,200	76.05
Martin Charron	378	23.95

=== Montmagny ===
Mayoral candidate	Vote	%
Gabrielle Brisebois	2,153	45.33
Pierre Bouffard	1,799	37.87
Michel Mercier	798	16.80

=== Saint-Apollinaire ===
Mayoral candidate	Vote	%
Jonathan Moreau (X)	Acclaimed	

=== Saint-Georges ===
Mayoral candidate	Vote	%
Manon Bougie	7,697	81.92
Sylvio Veilleux	1,699	18.08

=== Saint-Henri ===
Mayoral candidate	Vote	%
Germain Caron (X)	Acclaimed	

=== Saint-Joseph-de-Beauce ===
Mayoral candidate	Vote	%
Gaston Vachon	Acclaimed	

=== Saint-Lambert-de-Lauzon ===
Mayoral candidate	Vote	%
Olivier Dumais (X)	1,197	52.20
Charles Fecteau	1,096	47.80

=== Sainte-Marie ===
Mayoral candidate	Vote	%
Luce Lacroix	2,716	63.65
Marco Côté	1,551	36.35

=== Thetford Mines ===
Mayoral candidate	Vote	%
Marc-Alexandre Brousseau (X)	Acclaimed	

== Lanaudière ==
=== Charlemagne ===
Party	Mayoral candidate	Vote	%
Équipe Charlemagne	Normand Grenier (X)	Acclaimed	

=== Chertsey ===
Party	Mayoral candidate	Vote	%
Parti des citoyens de Chertsey	Michelle Joly (X)	1,528	55.34
Projet avenir Chertsey	François Quenneville	695	25.17
L'élan de Chertsey	Roan Riopel Desrochers	367	13.29
Independent	Valérie Léveillé	171	6.19

=== Joliette ===
Mayoral candidate	Vote	%
Pierre-Luc Bellerose (X)	Acclaimed	

=== L'Assomption ===
Party	Mayoral candidate	Vote	%
Vision L'Assomption - Équipe Sébastien Nadeau	Sébastien Nadeau (X)	Acclaimed	

=== L'Épiphanie ===
Party	Mayoral candidate	Vote	%
Équipe Steve Plante - L'Épiphanie en action	Steve Plante (X)	Acclaimed	

=== Lanoraie ===
Party	Mayoral candidate	Vote	%
Équipe Villeneuve	André Villeneuve (X)	1,082	51.65
Independent	Josée Castonguay	1,013	48.35

=== Lavaltrie ===
Party	Mayoral candidate	Vote	%
Independent	Christian Goulet (X)	2,476	52.04
Équipe Joel Latour	Joel Latour	2,282	47.96

=== Mascouche ===
==== Mayor ====
Party	Mayoral candidate	Vote	%
Vision démocratique de Mascouche - Équipe Guillaume Tremblay	Guillaume Tremblay (X)	11,578	80.38
Independent	Shad Dubé	2,059	14.29
Independent	Line Lavallée	439	3.05
Independent	Sylvain Picard	328	2.28

==== Mascouche City Council ====
District 1
Party	Council candidate	Vote	%
Vision démocratique de Mascouche - Équipe Guillaume Tremblay	Renée Chartier	907	88.40
Independent	Dayana Guerrero	119	11.60
District 2
Party	Council candidate	Vote	%
Vision démocratique de Mascouche - Équipe Guillaume Tremblay	Pierre Filteau	1,121	75.39
Independent	Guillaume Rodrigue	366	24.61
District 3
Party	Council candidate	Vote	%
Vision démocratique de Mascouche - Équipe Guillaume Tremblay	Anny Mailloux (X)	Acclaimed	
District 4
Party	Council candidate	Vote	%
Vision démocratique de Mascouche - Équipe Guillaume Tremblay	Marie-Claude Turcotte-Farly	Acclaimed	
District 5
Party	Council candidate	Vote	%
Vision démocratique de Mascouche - Équipe Guillaume Tremblay	Bertrand Lefebvre (X)	1,338	77.21
Independent	Dany Goulet	395	22.79
District 6
Party	Council candidate	Vote	%
Vision démocratique de Mascouche - Équipe Guillaume Tremblay	Pierre Nevraumont	1,290	81.96
Independent	Olivier Ouellet	284	18.04
District 7
Party	Council candidate	Vote	%
Vision démocratique de Mascouche - Équipe Guillaume Tremblay	Claudia Lafond St-Arneault	Acclaimed	
District 8
Party	Council candidate	Vote	%
Vision démocratique de Mascouche - Équipe Guillaume Tremblay	Patricia Lebel (X)	989	80.80
Independent	Francine Moreau	235	19.20
District 9
Party	Council candidate	Vote	%
Vision démocratique de Mascouche - Équipe Guillaume Tremblay	Lise Gagnon	1,152	83.54
Independent	Fabienne Robert	227	16.46
District 10
Party	Council candidate	Vote	%
Vision démocratique de Mascouche - Équipe Guillaume Tremblay	Éric Ladouceur	1,094	85.40
Independent	Pierre-Alexandre Bugeaud	187	14.60

=== Notre-Dame-des-Prairies ===
Mayoral candidate	Vote	%
Suzanne Dauphin (X)	Acclaimed	

=== Rawdon ===
Party	Mayoral candidate	Vote	%
Équipe Raymond Rougeau - Pour Rawdon	Raymond Rougeau (X)	2,114	59.13
Independent	David Gendron	1,356	37.93
Independent	Dominic Auger	105	2.94

=== Repentigny ===
==== Mayor ====
Party	Mayoral candidate	Vote	%
Avenir Repentigny - Équipe Nicolas Dufour	Nicolas Dufour (X)	18,473	69.42
Repentigny ensemble	Maxime Comtois	8,139	30.58

==== Repentigny City Council ====
District 1
Party	Council candidate	Vote	%
Avenir Repentigny - Équipe Nicolas Dufour	Raymond Masse (X)	1,779	69.87
Repentigny ensemble	Ricardo Ialenti	767	30.13
District 2
Party	Council candidate	Vote	%
Avenir Repentigny - Équipe Nicolas Dufour	Benoit Delisle	1,311	69.33
Repentigny ensemble	Dave McGraw	580	30.67
District 3
Party	Council candidate	Vote	%
Avenir Repentigny - Équipe Nicolas Dufour	Karine Benoit (X)	1,594	68.59
Repentigny ensemble	Stéphanie Simoneau	730	31.41
District 4
Party	Council candidate	Vote	%
Avenir Repentigny - Équipe Nicolas Dufour	Luc Rhéaume (X)	1,486	71.41
Repentigny ensemble	Bruno Morin	595	28.59
District 5
Party	Council candidate	Vote	%
Avenir Repentigny - Équipe Nicolas Dufour	Éric Lepage	1,736	71.03
Repentigny ensemble	Karel Oliver	708	28.97
District 6
Party	Council candidate	Vote	%
Avenir Repentigny - Équipe Nicolas Dufour	Martine Roux (X)	1,234	51.16
Repentigny ensemble	Sylvain Benoit	1,178	48.84
District 7
Party	Council candidate	Vote	%
Avenir Repentigny - Équipe Nicolas Dufour	Marlène Diallo	1,464	71.00
Repentigny ensemble	Khelifa Hareb	598	29.00
District 8
Party	Council candidate	Vote	%
Avenir Repentigny - Équipe Nicolas Dufour	Jennifer Robillard (X)	1,212	61.49
Repentigny ensemble	Mélissa Pierre	759	38.51
District 9
Party	Council candidate	Vote	%
Avenir Repentigny - Équipe Nicolas Dufour	Alexis Delage	1,554	56.88
Repentigny ensemble	Jean Langlois	1,178	43.12
District 10
Party	Council candidate	Vote	%
Avenir Repentigny - Équipe Nicolas Dufour	Kevin Buteau (X)	1,657	74.51
Repentigny ensemble	Karine Ouellette	515	23.16
Independent	Lievain Muzwyn Sikisi	52	2.34
District 11
Party	Council candidate	Vote	%
Avenir Repentigny - Équipe Nicolas Dufour	Chantal Routhier (X)	1,707	81.87
Repentigny ensemble	Jean-Pierre Couture	378	18.13
District 12
Party	Council candidate	Vote	%
Avenir Repentigny - Équipe Nicolas Dufour	Normand Urbain (X)	1,304	71.14
Repentigny ensemble	Jacques Raymond	529	28.86

=== Saint-Calixte ===
Mayoral candidate	Vote	%
Michel Jasmin (X)	768	41.18
Marc Michaud	671	35.98
Michel Larouche	281	15.07
David Patrie	83	4.56
Jayson Koshelowsky	62	3.32
Eugène Goyette	Withdrew	

=== Saint-Charles-Borromée ===
Party	Mayoral candidate	Vote	%
Collecticité - Équipe Alexis Nantel	Alexis Nantel	Acclaimed	

=== Saint-Donat ===
Party	Mayoral candidate	Vote	%
Équipe Deslauriers	Joé Deslauriers (X)		
Équipe Francois Gaudet	Francois Gaudet		

=== Saint-Félix-de-Valois ===
Party	Mayoral candidate	Vote	%
Saint-Félix ensemble	Audrey Boisjoly (X)	Acclaimed	

=== Saint-Jean-de-Matha ===
Party	Mayoral candidate	Vote	%
Parti mathalois	Sylvain Roberge (X)		

=== Saint-Lin–Laurentides ===
Party	Mayoral candidate	Vote	%
Équipe Isabelle Auger	Isabelle Auger	2,401	49.05
Équipe Lortie	Pierre Lortie	1,426	29.13
Équipe Luc Cyr	Luc Cyr	1,068	21.82

=== Saint-Paul ===
Mayoral candidate	Vote	%
Marc Pelletier	660	45.45
Mélanie Robichaud	488	33.61
Gabriel Caron Landry	304	20.94

=== Saint-Roch-de-l'Achigan ===
Mayoral candidate	Vote	%
Sébastien Marcil (X)	Acclaimed	

=== Sainte-Julienne ===
Party	Mayoral candidate	Vote	%
Équipe Jean-Pierre Charron - L'avenir de Sainte-Julienne	Jean-Pierre Charron (X)	1,805	43.44
Équipe Stéphane Breault	Stéphane Breault	1,645	39.59
Unissons Sainte-Julienne	Cathie Audet	705	16.97

=== Terrebonne ===
==== Mayor ====
Party	Mayoral candidate	Vote	%
Mouvement Terrebonne - Équipe Mathieu Traversy	Mathieu Traversy (X)	Acclaimed	

==== Terrebonne City Council ====
2025 Terrebonne city council election
- November 2, 2025

16 seats on Terrebonne City Council (Note: The Mayor is a member of City Council, but for the purposes of documentation is treated as their own individual.) 9 seats needed for a majority
- Turnout: 26.02% (in districts with elections)
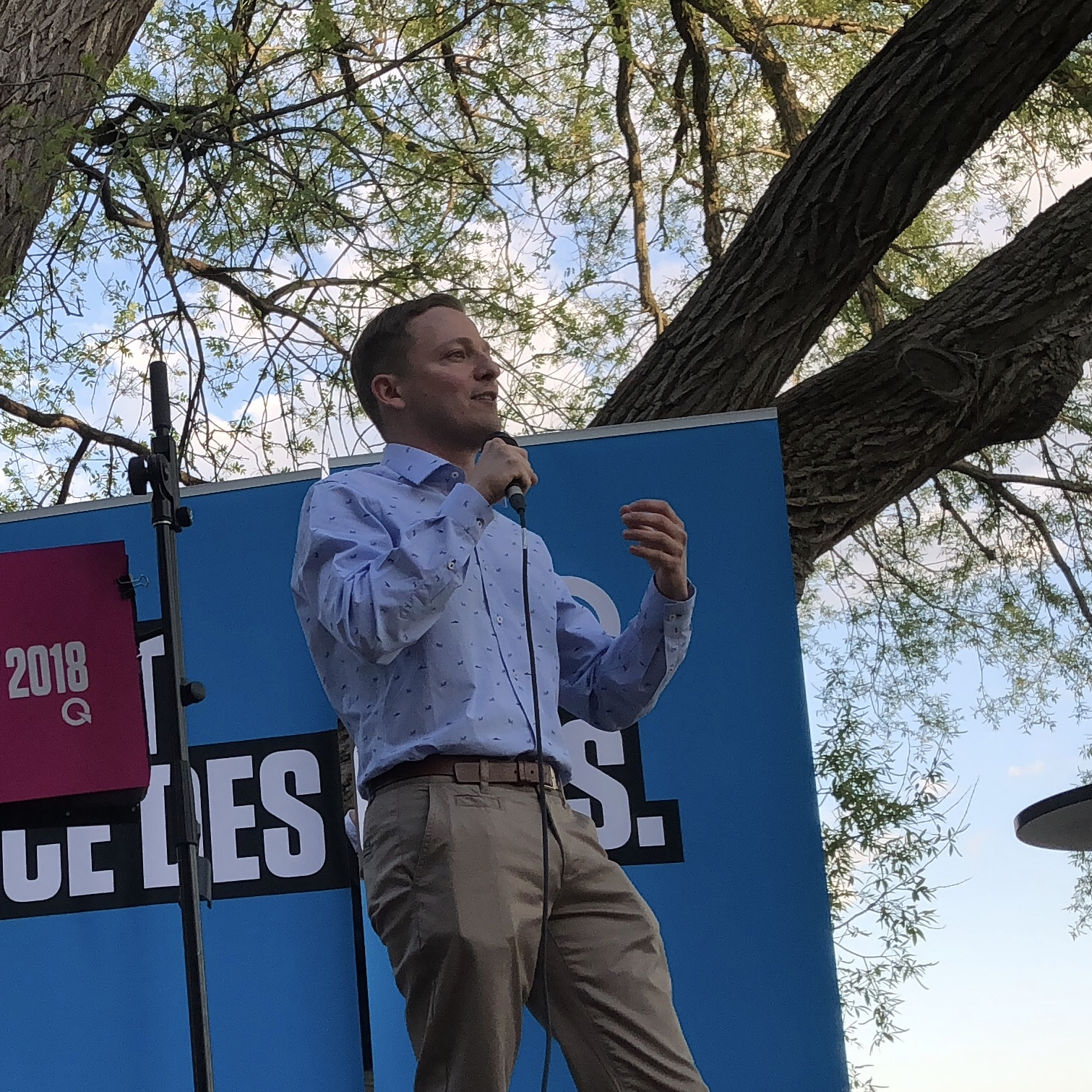
	First party	Second party
Leader	Mathieu Traversy	–
Party	Mouvement Terrebonne	Independents
Leader's seat	Mayor
Seats won	16	0
Popular vote	2,679	250
Percentage	91.46%	8.54%
Mayor before election
Mathieu Traversy
Mouvement Terrebonne
Mayor after election
Mathieu Traversy
Mouvement Terrebonne

Saint-Joachim District (1)
Party	Council candidate	Vote	%
Mouvement Terrebonne - Équipe Mathieu Traversy	Vicky Mokas (X)	Acclaimed	
Du Boisé-Laurier District (2)
Party	Council candidate	Vote	%
Mouvement Terrebonne - Équipe Mathieu Traversy	Raymond Berthiaume (X)	Acclaimed	
Du Ruisseau Noir District (3)
Party	Council candidate	Vote	%
Mouvement Terrebonne - Équipe Mathieu Traversy	Nathalie Lepage (X)	Acclaimed	
Terrebonne-Ouest District (4)
Party	Council candidate	Vote	%
Mouvement Terrebonne - Équipe Mathieu Traversy	Anna Guarnieri (X)	Acclaimed	
Grand Ruisseau District (5)
Party	Council candidate	Vote	%
Mouvement Terrebonne - Équipe Mathieu Traversy	Lindsay Jean	Acclaimed	
Comtois-La Pinière District (6)
Party	Council candidate	Vote	%
Mouvement Terrebonne - Équipe Mathieu Traversy	Valérie Doyon (X)	Acclaimed	
Côte de Terrebonne District (7)
Party	Council candidate	Vote	%
Mouvement Terrebonne - Équipe Mathieu Traversy	Marie-Eve Couturier (X)	1,184	89.02
Independent	Carolyne Hansen	146	10.98
Saint-Jean-Baptiste District (8)
Party	Council candidate	Vote	%
Mouvement Terrebonne - Équipe Mathieu Traversy	Carl Miguel Maldonado (X)	Acclaimed	
La Sablière-Hauteville District (9)
Party	Council candidate	Vote	%
Mouvement Terrebonne - Équipe Mathieu Traversy	Benoit Ladouceur (X)	Acclaimed	
Centre-Ville District (10)
Party	Council candidate	Vote	%
Mouvement Terrebonne - Équipe Mathieu Traversy	Eric Fortin	Acclaimed	
Seigneurie-Île-Saint-Jean District (11)
Party	Council candidate	Vote	%
Mouvement Terrebonne - Équipe Mathieu Traversy	Marie-Eve Dicaire	Acclaimed	
Vieux-Terrebonne District (12)
Party	Council candidate	Vote	%
Mouvement Terrebonne - Équipe Mathieu Traversy	Charles Messier	Acclaimed	
Coteau-des Vignobles District (13)
Party	Council candidate	Vote	%
Mouvement Terrebonne - Équipe Mathieu Traversy	Robert Auger (X)	Acclaimed	
Charles-Aubert District (14)
Party	Council candidate	Vote	%
Mouvement Terrebonne - Équipe Mathieu Traversy	Michel Corbeil (X)	Acclaimed	
Saint-Charles—Des Fleurs District (15)
Party	Council candidate	Vote	%
Mouvement Terrebonne - Équipe Mathieu Traversy	Sonia Leblanc (X)	Acclaimed	
Des Pionniers District (16)
Party	Council candidate	Vote	%
Mouvement Terrebonne - Équipe Mathieu Traversy	Marc-André Michaud (X)	1,495	93.50
Independent	Fati Bitout	104	6.50

== Laurentides ==
=== Blainville ===
==== Mayor ====
Party	Mayoral candidate	Vote	%
Vrai Blainville - Équipe Liza Poulin	Liza Poulin (X)	11,986	65.48
Action citoyens Blainville	Diane Lemelin	6,320	34.52

==== Blainville City Council ====
Fontainebleau District (1)
Party	Council candidate	Vote	%
Vrai Blainville - Équipe Liza Poulin	Marie-Claude Perron (X)	773	45.18
Action citoyens Blainville	Guylaine Beaudoin	657	38.40
Independent	Robert Gagnon	281	16.42
de la Côte-Saint-Louis District (2)
Party	Council candidate	Vote	%
Vrai Blainville - Équipe Liza Poulin	David Malenfant (X)	1,029	77.54
Action citoyens Blainville	Sonia Toulouse	298	22.46
Saint-Rédempteur District (3)
Party	Council candidate	Vote	%
Vrai Blainville - Équipe Liza Poulin	Jade Laporte	683	57.49
Action citoyens Blainville	Nathalie Ducharme	505	42.51
du Plan-Bouchard District (4)
Party	Council candidate	Vote	%
Vrai Blainville - Équipe Liza Poulin	Philippe Magnenat (X)	1,025	67.47
Action citoyens Blainville	Asmae Benamer	581	32.53
Notre-Dame-de-l'Assomption District (5)
Party	Council candidate	Vote	%
Vrai Blainville - Équipe Liza Poulin	Francis Allaire (X)	1,096	72.34
Action citoyens Blainville	Ruth Milius	419	27.66
Chante-Bois District (6)
Party	Council candidate	Vote	%
Vrai Blainville - Équipe Liza Poulin	Nicole Ruel (X)	1,129	73.98
Action citoyens Blainville	Ramy El-Kassis	397	26.02
des Hirondelles District (7)
Party	Council candidate	Vote	%
Vrai Blainville - Équipe Liza Poulin	Patrick Marineau (X)	1,160	78.22
Action citoyens Blainville	Alfredo Munoz	323	21.78
Alençon District (8)
Party	Council candidate	Vote	%
Vrai Blainville - Équipe Liza Poulin	Stéphane Bertrand (X)	1,277	75.52
Action citoyens Blainville	Sylvain Héroux	414	24.48
de la Renaissance District (9)
Party	Council candidate	Vote	%
Vrai Blainville - Équipe Liza Poulin	Michèle Murray (X)	1,148	69.37
Action citoyens Blainville	Josée Deschesnes	507	30.63
du Blainvillier District (10)
Party	Council candidate	Vote	%
Vrai Blainville - Équipe Liza Poulin	Marie-Claude Collin (X)	1,158	58.93
Action citoyens Blainville	Nick Carfagnini	807	41.07
Coteau District (11)
Party	Council candidate	Vote	%
Vrai Blainville - Équipe Liza Poulin	Nathalie St-Laurent	701	52.95
Action citoyens Blainville	Jérôme Plantevin	623	47.05
Henri-Dunant District (12)
Party	Council candidate	Vote	%
Vrai Blainville - Équipe Liza Poulin	Jean-François Pinard (X)	788	69.92
Action citoyens Blainville	Frédéric Labelle	339	30.08

=== Bois-des-Filion ===
Party	Mayoral candidate	Vote	%
Independent	Charles Bélanger	1,387	60.44
Équipe Blanchette - Projet filionois	Gilles Blanchette (X)	908	39.56

=== Boisbriand ===
Party	Mayoral candidate	Vote	%
Independent	Christine Beaudette (X)	5,456	62.98
Ralliement des citoyens de Boisbriand	Marlene Cordato	3,207	37.02

=== Brownsburg-Chatham ===
Mayoral candidate	Vote	%
Kévin Maurice (X)	Acclaimed	

=== Deux-Montagnes ===
Party	Mayoral candidate	Vote	%
Deux-Montagnes autrement - Équipe Denis Martin Team	Denis Martin (X)	Acclaimed	

=== Lachute ===
Party	Mayoral candidate	Vote	%
Équipe vision Lachute	Bernard Bigras-Denis (X)	3,013	81.43
Independent	Francis Karl Dubé	687	18.57

=== Lorraine ===
Party	Mayoral candidate	Vote	%
Équipe Comtois	Jean Comtois (X)	2,307	57.88
Équipe Ayoub - Le citoyen avant tout	Ramez Ayoub	1,679	42.12

=== Mirabel ===
==== Mayor ====
Party	Mayoral candidate	Vote	%
Mirabel uni	Roxanne Therrien	9,461	57.16
Action Mirabel - Équipe Laurin	Marc Laurin	5,153	31.13
Mouvement citoyen Mirabel	Pierre-Olivier Langlois	1,937	11.70

==== Mirabel City Council ====
District 1
Party	Council candidate	Vote	%
Mirabel uni	Marie-Eve Verdier	752	47.96
Action Mirabel - Équipe Laurin	Jonathan Therien	716	45.66
Mouvement citoyen Mirabel	Kasandra Cherrier	100	6.38
District 2
Party	Council candidate	Vote	%
Mirabel uni	David Bélanger	793	50.16
Action Mirabel - Équipe Laurin	Ghislain Turcot	708	44.78
Mouvement citoyen Mirabel	Stephanie Mingot	80	5.06
District 3
Party	Council candidate	Vote	%
Action Mirabel - Équipe Laurin	Robert Charron (X)	824	57.26
Mirabel uni	Pierre Trottier	534	37.11
Mouvement citoyen Mirabel	Benoit Beauchamp	81	5.63
District 4
Party	Council candidate	Vote	%
Mouvement citoyen Mirabel	Patrick Rebelo	615	37.30
Action Mirabel - Équipe Laurin	Veronica Elisii	556	33.72
Mirabel uni	Marie-Eve Collin	478	28.99
District 5
Party	Council candidate	Vote	%
Mirabel uni	Vincent Charbonneau	837	55.47
Action Mirabel - Équipe Laurin	Steve Charbonneau	496	32.87
Mouvement citoyen Mirabel	Daniela Rodriguez	176	11.66
District 6
Party	Council candidate	Vote	%
Mirabel uni	Sébastien Hamel	1,069	56.38
Action Mirabel - Équipe Laurin	Kathie Laurin	565	29.80
Mouvement citoyen Mirabel	Suzanne Courville	262	13.82
District 7
Party	Council candidate	Vote	%
Mirabel uni	Emilie Derganc (X)	1,369	73.52
Action Mirabel - Équipe Laurin	Kim Proulx	342	18.37
Mouvement citoyen Mirabel	Charles Emanuel Brossard	151	8.11
District 8
Party	Council candidate	Vote	%
Mirabel uni	Isabelle Gauthier (X)	1,118	65.00
Action Mirabel - Équipe Laurin	Marie-Chantal Tremblay	426	24.77
Mouvement citoyen Mirabel	Réal Brière	176	10.23
District 9
Party	Council candidate	Vote	%
Mirabel uni	Caroline Morin	830	48.68
Action Mirabel - Équipe Laurin	Patrick Vanier	738	43.28
Mouvement citoyen Mirabel	Cédric Desbiens	137	8.04
District 10
Party	Council candidate	Vote	%
Mirabel uni	Catherine Maréchal (X)	1,137	68.54
Action Mirabel - Équipe Laurin	Roxanna Di Rienzo	439	26.46
Mouvement citoyen Mirabel	Alexandre Gagnon	83	5.00

=== Mont-Blanc ===
Party	Mayoral candidate	Vote	%
Équipe Levert	Jean Simon Levert (X)		

=== Mont-Laurier ===
Mayoral candidate	Vote	%
Daniel Bourdon (X)	2,021	69.38
Daniel Brosseau	892	30.62

=== Mont-Tremblant ===
Party	Mayoral candidate	Vote	%
Ensemble Mont-Tremblant	Pascal De Bellefeuille	2,574	51.53
Équipe vision Mont-Tremblant	Dominique Laverdure	2,421	48.47

=== Morin-Heights ===
Mayoral candidate	Vote	%
Louise Cossette (X)		
André Major		

=== Oka ===
Party	Mayoral candidate	Vote	%
Équipe Pascal Quevillon	Pascal Quevillon (X)		
Independent	Patrick Hardy		

=== Piedmont ===
Party	Mayoral candidate	Vote	%
Équipe Piedmont, naturellement	Bernard Bouclin		
Équipe Denis Royal	Denis Royal		

=== Pointe-Calumet ===
Party	Mayoral candidate	Vote	%
Équipe Sonia Fontaine	Sonia Fontaine (X)	Acclaimed	

=== Prévost ===
Party	Mayoral candidate	Vote	%
Renouveau prévostois avec Paul Germain	Paul Germain (X)	2,871	55.21
Rassemblement prévostois avec Nicolas Toupin	Nicolas Toupin	2,329	44.79

=== Rivière-Rouge ===
Party	Mayoral candidate	Vote	%
Independent	Déborah Bélanger		
Independent	Pierre Alexandre Morin		
Équipe Therrien	Gilbert Therrien		

=== Rosemère ===
Party	Mayoral candidate	Vote	%
Vision Rosemère - Équipe Marie-Elaine Pitre	Marie-Elaine Pitre	3,292	58.13
Ensemble Rosemère Together	Sophie M. Cardinal	1,315	23.22
Westram collectif / Collective	Eric Westram (X)	929	16.40
Independent	Jonathan Rheault	127	2.24

=== Saint-Adolphe-d'Howard ===
Party	Mayoral candidate	Vote	%
Équipe Line Légaré	Line Légaré		
Équipe Sarrazin	Alexendre Sarrazin		

=== Saint-Colomban ===
Party	Mayoral candidate	Vote	%
Ensemble Saint-Colomban	Xavier-Antoine Lalande (X)	Acclaimed	

=== Saint-Eustache ===
Party	Mayoral candidate	Vote	%
Option Saint-Eustache - Équipe Marc Lamarre	Marc Lamarre	Acclaimed	

==== Saint-Eustache City Council ====
Vieux-Saint-Eustache District (1)
Party	Council candidate	Vote	%
Option Saint-Eustache - Équipe Marc Lamarre	Michèle Labelle (X)	758	70.84
Independent	Andréanne Grondin	312	29.16
Carrefour-Nord District (2)
Party	Council candidate	Vote	%
Option Saint-Eustache - Équipe Marc Lamarre	Guillaume Lalonde	Acclaimed	
Rivière-Nord District (3)
Party	Council candidate	Vote	%
Option Saint-Eustache - Équipe Marc Lamarre	Sylvie St-Amour	Acclaimed	
des Érables District (4)
Party	Council candidate	Vote	%
Option Saint-Eustache - Équipe Marc Lamarre	Iann-Carlos Armijo	Acclaimed	
Clair Matin District (5)
Party	Council candidate	Vote	%
Option Saint-Eustache - Équipe Marc Lamarre	Karl Béliveau	Acclaimed	
de la Seigneurie District (6)
Party	Council candidate	Vote	%
Option Saint-Eustache - Équipe Marc Lamarre	Pierre-François Hervieux	Acclaimed	
des Moissons District (7)
Party	Council candidate	Vote	%
Option Saint-Eustache - Équipe Marc Lamarre	Isabelle Lefebvre (X)	1,127	87.36
Independent	Samuel Lévesque	163	12.64
des Îles District (8)
Party	Council candidate	Vote	%
Option Saint-Eustache - Équipe Marc Lamarre	Thomas Lebeau	Acclaimed	
Plateau des Chênes District (9)
Party	Council candidate	Vote	%
Option Saint-Eustache - Équipe Marc Lamarre	Sylvie Mallette (X)	773	65.01
Independent	René Vachon	416	34.99
des Jardins District (10)
Party	Council candidate	Vote	%
Option Saint-Eustache - Équipe Marc Lamarre	Yves Roy (X)	593	64.67
Independent	Yannick Larivière	324	35.33

=== Saint-Hippolyte ===
Party	Mayoral candidate	Vote	%
Équipe Isabelle Poulin	Isabelle Poulin	1,751	47.82
Équipe Yves Dagenais	Yves Dagenais (X)	1,137	31.05
Collectif vision citoyenne	Sonia Tremblay	774	21.14

=== Saint-Jérôme ===
==== Mayor ====
Party	Mayoral candidate	Vote	%
Mouvement jérômien - Équipe Rémi Barbeau	Rémi Barbeau	11,677	59.94
Avenir Saint-Jérôme - Équipe Martin Pigeon	Martin Pigeon	7,804	40.06

==== Saint-Jérôme City Council ====
District 1
Party	Council candidate	Vote	%
Mouvement jérômien - Équipe Rémi Barbeau	Eric Monette	997	69.28
Avenir Saint-Jérôme - Équipe Martin Pigeon	Ronald Raymond (X)	442	30.72
District 2
Party	Council candidate	Vote	%
Mouvement jérômien - Équipe Rémi Barbeau	Pascal St-Onge	855	57.89
Avenir Saint-Jérôme - Équipe Martin Pigeon	Stéphane Joyal (X)	622	42.11
District 3
Party	Council candidate	Vote	%
Mouvement jérômien - Équipe Rémi Barbeau	Jacques Bouchard (X)	869	55.07
Avenir Saint-Jérôme - Équipe Martin Pigeon	Philip Lapalme	709	44.93
District 4
Party	Council candidate	Vote	%
Mouvement jérômien - Équipe Rémi Barbeau	Joanie Mathieu	1,011	63.75
Avenir Saint-Jérôme - Équipe Martin Pigeon	Dominic Boyer (X)	575	36.25
District 5
Party	Council candidate	Vote	%
Mouvement jérômien - Équipe Rémi Barbeau	Jessica Desroches Lauzon	514	47.64
Avenir Saint-Jérôme - Équipe Martin Pigeon	Isabelle Danis-Marineau	422	39.11
Independent	Carla Pierre-Paul (X)	143	13.25
District 6
Party	Council candidate	Vote	%
Mouvement jérômien - Équipe Rémi Barbeau	Isabelle L'Heureux-Leblanc	837	58.17
Avenir Saint-Jérôme - Équipe Martin Pigeon	Jean Junior Désormeaux (X)	602	41.83
District 7
Party	Council candidate	Vote	%
Mouvement jérômien - Équipe Rémi Barbeau	Sonia Goulet	1,058	63.24
Avenir Saint-Jérôme - Équipe Martin Pigeon	Michel Gagnon (X)	615	36.76
District 8
Party	Council candidate	Vote	%
Mouvement jérômien - Équipe Rémi Barbeau	Marc-Antoine Lachance (X)	970	58.08
Avenir Saint-Jérôme - Équipe Martin Pigeon	Francis Labelle	700	41.92
District 9
Party	Council candidate	Vote	%
Mouvement jérômien - Équipe Rémi Barbeau	Paula Gonzalves	940	66.71
Avenir Saint-Jérôme - Équipe Martin Pigeon	Gaëtan Lapointe	469	33.29
District 10
Party	Council candidate	Vote	%
Mouvement jérômien - Équipe Rémi Barbeau	Frédérik Clément	1,179	69.52
Avenir Saint-Jérôme - Équipe Martin Pigeon	Carole Savoie	517	30.48
District 11
Party	Council candidate	Vote	%
Mouvement jérômien - Équipe Rémi Barbeau	Simon Marcil	1,083	49.50
Avenir Saint-Jérôme - Équipe Martin Pigeon	Kim Nunès	1,071	48.95
Independent	Nicolas David Herrera	34	1.55
District 12
Party	Council candidate	Vote	%
Mouvement jérômien - Équipe Rémi Barbeau	Marie-Claude Poitras	1,300	62.35
Avenir Saint-Jérôme - Équipe Martin Pigeon	Nathalie Lasalle (X)	785	37.65

=== Saint-Joseph-du-Lac ===
Party	Mayoral candidate	Vote	%
Équipe Benoit Proulx	Benoit Proulx (X)	Acclaimed	

=== Saint-Sauveur ===
Party	Mayoral candidate	Vote	%
Parti sauverois	Luc Martel	2,192	50.41
Independent	Robert Gravel	2,156	49.59

=== Sainte-Adèle ===
Party	Mayoral candidate	Vote	%
Équipe Nadine Brière - Vision citoyenne	Nadine Brière	2,716	53.77
Independent	Martin Jolicoeur	2,335	46.23

=== Sainte-Agathe-des-Monts ===
Party	Mayoral candidate	Vote	%
Vision action Sainte-Agathe-des-Monts - Équipe Broué	Frédéric Broué (X)	Acclaimed	

=== Sainte-Anne-des-Lacs ===
Party	Mayoral candidate	Vote	%
L'Équipe Dalzell	John Dalzell		

=== Sainte-Anne-des-Plaines ===
Party	Mayoral candidate	Vote	%
Parti anneplainois	Jean-René Labelle	2,468	57.66
Parti Vision Action	Julie Boivin (X)	1,812	42.34

=== Sainte-Marthe-sur-le-Lac ===
Party	Mayoral candidate	Vote	%
Voix citoyenne - Équipe François Robillard	François Robillard (X)	Acclaimed	

=== Sainte-Sophie ===
Party	Mayoral candidate	Vote	%
Accent Sainte-Sophie - Équipe Lamothe	Guy Lamothe (X)	Acclaimed	

=== Sainte-Thérèse ===
Party	Mayoral candidate	Vote	%
Parti citoyen - Équipe Christian Charron	Christian Charron (X)	4,436	58.09
Parti thérésien - Équipe Luc Vézina	Luc Vézina	3,201	41.91

=== Val-David ===
Party	Mayoral candidate	Vote	%
Action Val-David - Équipe Jean-Claude Rocheleau	Jean-Claude Rocheleau	1,435	51.18
Au coeur de Val-David - Équipe Dominique Forget	Dominique Forget (X)	1,369	48.82

== Montérégie ==
=== Acton Vale ===
Mayoral candidate	Vote	%
Éric Charbonneau (X)	Acclaimed	

=== Beauharnois ===
Mayoral candidate	Vote	%
Alain Dubuc (X)	Acclaimed	

=== Beloeil ===
Party	Mayoral candidate	Vote	%
Beloeil, c'est nous! - Équipe Daniel Picard	Daniel Picard	4,896	51.96
Oser Beloeil - Équipe Nadine Viau	Nadine Viau (X)	4,248	45.09
Independent	Olivier Cholette	278	2.95

=== Boucherville ===
Party	Mayoral candidate	Vote	%
Équipe Jean Martel - Option citoyens - citoyennes	Jean Martel (X)	Acclaimed	

==== Boucherville City Council ====
Marie-Victorin District (1)
Party	Council candidate	Vote	%
Équipe Jean Martel - Option Citoyens Citoyennes	Isabelle Bleau (X)	1,393	90.93
Independent	Dayana Caripa	139	9.07
Rivière-aux-Pins District (2)
Party	Council candidate	Vote	%
Équipe Jean Martel - Option Citoyens Citoyennes	Alexandre Ouellet	1,065	77.06
Independent	Boukare Tall	317	22.94
Des Découvreurs District (3)
Party	Council candidate	Vote	%
Équipe Jean Martel - Option Citoyens Citoyennes	Josée Bissonnette (X)	Acclaimed	
Harmonie District (4)
Party	Council candidate	Vote	%
Équipe Jean Martel - Option Citoyens Citoyennes	Anne Barabé (X)	Acclaimed	
La Seigneurie District (5)
Party	Council candidate	Vote	%
Équipe Jean Martel - Option Citoyens Citoyennes	François Desmarais (X)	1,165	69.68
Independent	Michaël Léveillée	507	30.32
Saint-Louis District (6)
Party	Council candidate	Vote	%
Équipe Jean Martel - Option Citoyens Citoyennes	Isabelle Harvey	Acclaimed	
De Normandie District (7)
Party	Council candidate	Vote	%
Équipe Jean Martel - Option Citoyens Citoyennes	Raouf Absi	Acclaimed	
Le Boisé District (8)
Party	Council candidate	Vote	%
Équipe Jean Martel - Option Citoyens Citoyennes	Andrée Savard	Acclaimed	

=== Brossard ===
==== Mayor ====
Party	Mayoral candidate	Vote	%
Brossard ensemble - Équipe Doreen Assaad / Brossard Together - Team Doreen Assaad	Doreen Assaad (X)	16,872	80.18
Vision Brossard - Équipe Hanadi Saad Team	Hanadi Saad	4,170	19.82

==== Brossard City Council ====
District 1
Party	Council candidate	Vote	%
Brossard ensemble - Équipe Doreen Assaad / Brossard Together - Team Doreen Assaad	Christian Gaudette (X)	1,291	89.28
Vision Brossard - Équipe Hanadi Saad Team	Dave Hamelin-Schuilenburg	155	10.72
District 2
Party	Council candidate	Vote	%
Brossard ensemble - Équipe Doreen Assaad / Brossard Together - Team Doreen Assaad	Barbara Vafopoulos	1,083	80.64
Vision Brossard - Équipe Hanadi Saad Team	Luke Porowski	260	19.36
District 3
Party	Council candidate	Vote	%
Brossard ensemble - Équipe Doreen Assaad / Brossard Together - Team Doreen Assaad	Tina DelVecchio	1,677	77.39
Independent	Diane Girard	259	11.95
Vision Brossard - Équipe Hanadi Saad Team	Catherine Kirkwood	231	10.66
District 4
Party	Council candidate	Vote	%
Brossard ensemble - Équipe Doreen Assaad / Brossard Together - Team Doreen Assaad	Stéphanie Quintal	1,107	83.11
Vision Brossard - Équipe Hanadi Saad Team	Stephanie Tleyji	225	16.89
District 5
Party	Council candidate	Vote	%
Brossard ensemble - Équipe Doreen Assaad / Brossard Together - Team Doreen Assaad	Diane Alexander	1,423	77.93
Vision Brossard - Équipe Hanadi Saad Team	Emilia Farcutiu	403	22.07
District 6
Party	Council candidate	Vote	%
Brossard ensemble - Équipe Doreen Assaad / Brossard Together - Team Doreen Assaad	Nicolas Thomas	1,308	63.84
Vision Brossard - Équipe Hanadi Saad Team	Paul Imad	668	32.60
Independent	Amiya Khare	73	3.56
District 7
Party	Council candidate	Vote	%
Brossard ensemble - Équipe Doreen Assaad / Brossard Together - Team Doreen Assaad	Sophie Allard	1,660	83.97
Vision Brossard - Équipe Hanadi Saad Team	Brahim Ouamalich	262	13.25
Independent	Lalit Singh	55	2.78
District 8
Party	Council candidate	Vote	%
Brossard ensemble - Équipe Doreen Assaad / Brossard Together - Team Doreen Assaad	Antoine Assaf	1,416	76.79
Vision Brossard - Équipe Hanadi Saad Team	Gary Zhang	428	23.21
District 9
Party	Council candidate	Vote	%
Brossard ensemble - Équipe Doreen Assaad / Brossard Together - Team Doreen Assaad	Patrick Langlois	1,453	59.28
Vision Brossard - Équipe Hanadi Saad Team	Xixi Li	998	40.72
District 10
Party	Council candidate	Vote	%
Brossard ensemble - Équipe Doreen Assaad / Brossard Together - Team Doreen Assaad	Louis-Philippe Latour	699	61.69
Vision Brossard - Équipe Hanadi Saad Team	Patricia Labrecque	434	38.31
Independent	Giancarlo Qualizza	Withdrew	
District 11
Party	Council candidate	Vote	%
Brossard ensemble - Équipe Doreen Assaad / Brossard Together - Team Doreen Assaad	Michael Forian	1,645	79.35
Vision Brossard - Équipe Hanadi Saad Team	Jean-Virgile Tassé-Themens	428	20.65
District 12
Party	Council candidate	Vote	%
Brossard ensemble - Équipe Doreen Assaad / Brossard Together - Team Doreen Assaad	Daniel Lucier	1,224	83.55
Vision Brossard - Équipe Hanadi Saad Team	Christian Guillotte	241	16.45

=== Candiac ===
Party	Mayoral candidate	Vote	%
Action Candiac - Équipe Normand Dyotte	Normand Dyotte (X)	Acclaimed	

=== Carignan ===
Party	Mayoral candidate	Vote	%
Pro-citoyens - Équipe Patrick Marquès	Patrick Marquès (X)	2,266	85.61
Independent	Morris Gatien	216	8.16
Independent	Mohamed-Elyès Jouini	165	6.23

=== Chambly ===
Mayoral candidate	Vote	%
Alexandra Labbé (X)	5,526	65.39
Mario Lambert	2,925	34.61

=== Châteauguay ===
Party	Mayoral candidate	Vote	%
Alliance Châteauguay - Équipe Éric Allard Team	Éric Allard (X)	Acclaimed	

==== Châteauguay City Council ====
de Jack (1)
Party	Council candidate	Vote	%
Alliance Châteauguay - Équipe Éric Allard Team	Barry Doyle (X)	Acclaimed	
de Primot (2)
Party	Council candidate	Vote	%
Alliance Châteauguay - Équipe Éric Allard Team	Arlene Bryant (X)	Acclaimed	
de Robutel de la Noüe (3)
Party	Council candidate	Vote	%
Alliance Châteauguay - Équipe Éric Allard Team	Eric Corbeil (X)	Acclaimed	
de Bumbray (4)
Party	Council candidate	Vote	%
Alliance Châteauguay - Équipe Éric Allard Team	Lucie Laberge (X)	Acclaimed	
de Malette (5)
Party	Council candidate	Vote	%
Alliance Châteauguay - Équipe Éric Allard Team	Nathalie Marchand	Acclaimed	
de Salaberry (6)
Party	Council candidate	Vote	%
Alliance Châteauguay - Équipe Éric Allard Team	Marie Louise Kerneis (X)	Acclaimed	
de Lang (7)
Party	Council candidate	Vote	%
Alliance Châteauguay - Équipe Éric Allard Team	Mike Gendron (X)	Acclaimed	
d'Youville (8)
Party	Council candidate	Vote	%
Alliance Châteauguay - Équipe Éric Allard Team	François Le Borgne (X)	Acclaimed	
de Desparois (9)
Party	Council candidate	Vote	%
Alliance Châteauguay - Équipe Éric Allard Team	Sylvie Castonguay	Acclaimed	
de Le Moyne (10)
Party	Council candidate	Vote	%
Alliance Châteauguay - Équipe Éric Allard Team	Luc Daoust (X)	Acclaimed	

=== Contrecoeur ===
Mayoral candidate	Vote	%
Maud Allaire (X)	1,839	58.72
Claude Bérard	1,293	41.28

=== Coteau-du-Lac ===
Mayoral candidate	Vote	%
Andrée Brosseau (X)	1,829	66.20
Alain Laprade	934	33.80

=== Delson ===
Party	Mayoral candidate	Vote	%
Alliance Delson	Christian Ouellette (X)	Acclaimed	

=== Hudson ===
Mayoral candidate	Vote	%
Chloe Hutchison (X)	1,283	67.07
Chantal Perreault	630	32.93

=== L'Île-Perrot ===
Mayoral candidate	Vote	%
Marc Deslauriers	2,166	74.36
Gabrielle Labbé	747	25.64

=== La Prairie ===
Party	Mayoral candidate	Vote	%
Place aux citoyens	Frédéric Galantai (X)	4,766	60.37
Mouvement La Prairie	Ian Rajotte	2,647	33.53
Independent	Normand Vocino	373	4.72
Independent	Shoaib-Hasan Shaikh	109	1.38

=== Les Cèdres ===
Mayoral candidate	Vote	%
Michel Proulx	Acclaimed	

=== Les Coteaux ===
Mayoral candidate	Vote	%
Sylvain Brazeau (X)	Acclaimed	

=== Marieville ===
Mayoral candidate	Vote	%
Vincent Després (X)	2,334	74.71
Caroline Gagnon	790	25.29

=== McMasterville ===
Mayoral candidate	Vote	%
Magalie Taillon	1,357	80.06
Antoine Barrette	338	19.94

=== Mercier ===
Party	Mayoral candidate	Vote	%
Parti avenir Mercier	Lise Michaud (X)	Acclaimed	

=== Mont-Saint-Hilaire ===
Party	Mayoral candidate	Vote	%
Transition MSH	Marc-André Guertin (X)	Acclaimed	

=== Notre-Dame-de-l'Île-Perrot ===
Party	Mayoral candidate	Vote	%
Option citoyens	Danie Deschênes (X)	2,237	57.42
Independent	Patrick Lalonde	1,493	38.32
Independent	Barnabé Elouna	166	4.26

=== Otterburn Park ===
Mayoral candidate	Vote	%
Mélanie Villeneuve (X)	1,735	69.57
Stéphane L'Abbé	759	30.43

=== Pincourt ===
Mayoral candidate	Vote	%
Claude Comeau (X)	2,667	81.63
Renée Daoust	600	18.37

=== Richelieu ===
Party	Mayoral candidate	Vote	%
Équipe horizon Richelieu	Jacques Ladouceur	1,352	66.40
Independent	Claude Gauthier (X)	684	33.60

=== Rigaud ===
Party	Mayoral candidate	Vote	%
Independent	Charles Meunier	1,445	54.34
Ensemble Rigaud	Kevin Ménard	1,214	45.66

=== Saint-Amable ===
Party	Mayoral candidate	Vote	%
Saint-Amable Vrai - Équipe Simon Lacoste	Simon Lacoste	2,447	59.86
Saint-Amable ensemble - Équipe Mathieu Daviault	Mathieu Daviault	1,641	40.14

=== Saint-Basile-le-Grand ===
Mayoral candidate	Vote	%
Kim Méthot	2,858	57.15
Simon Bellemare	2,143	42.85

=== Saint-Bruno-de-Montarville ===
Party	Mayoral candidate	Vote	%
Citoyens d'abord Saint-Bruno - Équipe Grisé	Ludovic Grisé Farand (X)	8,470	87.27
Independent	Louis Mercier	1,236	12.73

=== Saint-Césaire ===
Mayoral candidate	Vote	%
Sylvain Létourneau	1,465	66.99
Patrick Viens	666	30.45
Teddy Ikolonga	56	2.56

=== Saint-Constant ===
Party	Mayoral candidate	Vote	%
Équipe Jean-Claude Boyer	Jean-Claude Boyer (X)	Acclaimed	

=== Saint-Hyacinthe ===
==== Mayor ====
Mayoral candidate	Vote	%
André Beauregard (X)	9,664	61.83
Sylvain Morin	5,594	35.79
Othmen Bouattour	373	2.39

==== Saint-Hyacinthe City Council ====
Council candidate	Vote	%
Sainte-Rosalie District (1)
Donald Côté (X)	Acclaimed	
Yamaska District (2)
Pierre Thériault (X)	648	37.81
Jordan Bernard	587	34.25
Nathalie Allard	479	27.95
Saint-Joseph District (3)
Mélanie Bédard (X)	1,093	73.31
Jean-Luc Cécyre	398	26.69
La Providence District (4)
Bernard Barré (X)	1,057	64.26
Julie Marcotte	588	35.74
Douville Sud District (5)
David-Olivier Huard (X)	1,320	71.78
Paul D. Carrière	519	28.22
Saint-Thomas-d'Aquin District (6)
Sylvie Gosselin	1,070	57.25
Richard Lagacé	799	42.75
Saint-Sacrement-Sacré-Coeur District (7)
Sonia Chénier	788	58.07
Annie Pelletier (X)	569	41.93
Bois-Joli District (8)
David Bousquet	1,465	76.66
Carl Vaillancourt	446	23.34
Douville Nord - Notre-Dame District (9)
André Charron	650	42.07
Félix Bédard	606	39.22
Caroline Nadeau	289	18.71
Cascades District (10)
Jeannot Caron (X)	576	62.07
Jani Barré	352	37.93

=== Saint-Jean-sur-Richelieu ===
==== Mayor ====
Party	Mayoral candidate	Vote	%
Coalition Éric Latour	Éric Latour	13,321	41.81
Équipe Maryline Charbonneau - Démocratie Saint-Jean	Maryline Charbonneau	12,685	39.81
Équipe Andrée Bouchard	Andrée Bouchard (X)	3,773	11.84
Équipe François Roy	François Roy	2,081	6.53

==== Saint-Jean-sur-Richelieu City Council ====
District 1
Party	Council candidate	Vote	%
Coalition Éric Latour	Mélanie Dufresne (X)	1,023	58.16
Équipe Maryline Charbonneau - Démocratie Saint-Jean	Éric Dubois	412	23.42
Équipe Andrée Bouchard	Philippe Bernier-Levesque	239	13.59
Équipe François Roy	Pascale Lanteigne	85	4.83
District 2
Party	Council candidate	Vote	%
Équipe Maryline Charbonneau - Démocratie Saint-Jean	Bruno Santerre	1,032	36.57
Coalition Éric Latour	Sonia Bond	726	25.73
Independent	Jean-René Bertrand	680	24.10
Équipe Andrée Bouchard	Marianne Lambert (X)	276	9.78
Équipe François Roy	Jean-Marc Couture	108	3.83
District 3
Party	Council candidate	Vote	%
Coalition Éric Latour	Jérémie Meunier (X)	1,222	45.03
Équipe Maryline Charbonneau - Démocratie Saint-Jean	Louise Lemieux	1,046	38.54
Équipe Andrée Bouchard	André-Claude Beaulac	276	10.17
Équipe François Roy	Serge Jr Turgeon	170	6.26
District 4
Party	Council candidate	Vote	%
Équipe Andrée Bouchard	Louis Boucher	1,153	38.55
Coalition Éric Latour	Jean Fontaine (X)	1,150	38.45
Équipe Maryline Charbonneau - Démocratie Saint-Jean	Patrick Lamarche	528	17.65
Équipe François Roy	Annie Dumont	160	5.35
District 5
Party	Council candidate	Vote	%
Coalition Éric Latour	Sébastien Gaudette (X)	566	32.60
Équipe Maryline Charbonneau - Démocratie Saint-Jean	Emeline Nadège Monkam	560	32.26
Équipe Andrée Bouchard	Anne-Marie Noël	301	17.34
Independent	François Petit	172	9.91
Équipe François Roy	Lucie Vallée	137	7.89
District 6
Party	Council candidate	Vote	%
Coalition Éric Latour	Patricia Poissant (X)	1,175	46.39
Équipe Maryline Charbonneau - Démocratie Saint-Jean	Pierre Boudreau	872	34.43
Équipe Andrée Bouchard	Claudia Laliberté	322	12.71
Équipe François Roy	Sylvain Perron	164	6.47
District 7
Party	Council candidate	Vote	%
Coalition Éric Latour	Yvon Godin	929	39.28
Équipe Maryline Charbonneau - Démocratie Saint-Jean	Caroline Côté-Larose	844	35.69
Équipe Andrée Bouchard	Michelle Poupart	411	17.38
Independent	Bernard Nadeau	103	4.36
Équipe François Roy	Rafia Bouazzaoui	78	3.30
District 8
Party	Council candidate	Vote	%
Équipe Maryline Charbonneau - Démocratie Saint-Jean	Marie Tremblay	1,358	41.16
Coalition Éric Latour	Stephan Duquette	814	24.67
Independent	Marco Savard (X)	693	21.01
Équipe Andrée Bouchard	François Blais	271	8.21
Équipe François Roy	Cédric Gaulin	163	4.94
District 9
Party	Council candidate	Vote	%
Coalition Éric Latour	Daniel Hacherel	1,011	41.90
Équipe Maryline Charbonneau - Démocratie Saint-Jean	Nathalie Laberge	969	40.16
Équipe Andrée Bouchard	Lyne Poitras (X)	301	12.47
Équipe François Roy	Cindy Lavallee	132	5.47
Party	Council candidate	Vote	%
Coalition Éric Latour	Ian Langlois	1,485	46.86
Équipe Maryline Charbonneau - Démocratie Saint-Jean	Mélanie Gauthier	1,098	34.65
Équipe Andrée Bouchard	Benoit Lachapelle	419	13.22
Équipe François Roy	Eliesse Bekkari	167	5.27
District 11
Party	Council candidate	Vote	%
Coalition Éric Latour	Claire Charbonneau (X)	1,164	46.49
Équipe Maryline Charbonneau - Démocratie Saint-Jean	Sylvain Massé	931	37.18
Équipe Andrée Bouchard	François Carrier Thivierge	278	11.10
Équipe François Roy	Eric Geoffrion	131	5.23
District 12
Party	Council candidate	Vote	%
Équipe Maryline Charbonneau - Démocratie Saint-Jean	Luko Boisvert	1,807	50.90
Coalition Éric Latour	Samuel Corriveau	1,333	37.55
Équipe Andrée Bouchard	Jean-François Dumas	227	6.39
Équipe François Roy	Steve Pageau	183	5.15

=== Saint-Lambert ===
Mayoral candidate	Vote	%
Loïc Blancquaert	4,779	60.80
Pascale Mongrain (X)	2,900	36.90
Patrick Lemire	181	2.30

=== Saint-Lazare ===
Mayoral candidate	Vote	%
Geneviève Lachance (X)	3,777	63.47
François Beaulne	1,383	23.24
Marie Morin	364	6.12
Tamas Farkas	274	4.60
Bruce Gonsalves	153	2.57

=== Saint-Philippe ===
Party	Mayoral candidate	Vote	%
Alliance avenir Saint-Philippe - Équipe Christian Marin	Christian Marin (X)	1,288	51.56
Independent	Jonathan Hamel	1,210	48.44

=== Saint-Pie ===
Mayoral candidate	Vote	%
Mario St-Pierre (X)	Acclaimed	

=== Saint-Rémi ===
Mayoral candidate	Vote	%
Sylvie Gagnon-Breton (X)	Acclaimed	

=== Saint-Zotique ===
Mayoral candidate	Vote	%
Jean-Pierre Daoust	1,652	52.71
Paul Forget	1,482	47.29

=== Sainte-Catherine ===
Party	Mayoral candidate	Vote	%
Équipe Sylvain Bouchard - Unis pour Sainte-Catherine	Sylvain Bouchard	3,065	64.40
Action Sainte-Catherine - Équipe Rock Caron	Rock Caron	1,694	35.60

=== Sainte-Julie ===
Party	Mayoral candidate	Vote	%
La voix des citoyens - Équipe Mario Lemay	Mario Lemay (X)	6,374	76.85
Parti de Sainte-Julie	Christian Komze	1,920	23.15

=== Sainte-Martine ===
Mayoral candidate	Vote	%
Mélanie Lefort (X)	Acclaimed	

=== Salaberry-de-Valleyfield ===
Mayoral candidate	Vote	%
Miguel Lemieux (X)	Acclaimed	

==== Salaberry-de-Valleyfield City Council ====
Candidate	Vote	%
District 1
Michel Martinet	Acclaimed	
District 2
Jean-Marc Rochon (X)	Acclaimed	
District 3
France Chenail (X)	Acclaimed	
District 4
Stéphane Leduc (X)	Acclaimed	
District 5
Stéphanie Amesse	Acclaimed	
District 6
Patrick Rancourt (X)	834	82.82
Ryan Michon	173	17.18
District 7
Jean-François Giroux (X)	451	56.23
François Tessier	351	43.77
District 8
Sophie Sirois-Perras (X)	Acclaimed	

=== Sorel-Tracy ===
Mayoral candidate	Vote	%
Patrick Péloquin (X)	6,785	93.16
Julien Manseau-Goyette	498	6.84

=== Varennes ===
Party	Mayoral candidate	Vote	%
Parti durable - Équipe Damphousse	Martin Damphousse (X)	6,668	78.21
Independent	Bruno Lavoie	1,858	21.79

=== Vaudreuil-Dorion ===
Party	Mayoral candidate	Vote	%
Parti de l'action de Vaudreuil-Dorion	Paul Dumoulin	5,507	58.98
Inspire Vaudreuil-Dorion	Karine Lechasseur	3,830	41.02

==== Vaudreuil-Dorion City Council ====
Quinchien District (1)
Party	Council candidate	Vote	%
Parti de l'action de Vaudreuil-Dorion	Luc Marsan (X)	882	69.39
Inspire Vaudreuil-Dorion	Marie Camita Célestin	389	30.61
Valois District (2)
Party	Council candidate	Vote	%
Parti de l'action de Vaudreuil-Dorion	François Séguin (X)	764	68.95
Inspire Vaudreuil-Dorion	Maëlys Eouani	344	31.05
Des Bâtisseurs District (3)
Party	Council candidate	Vote	%
Inspire Vaudreuil-Dorion	Jasmine Sharma (X)	721	51.10
Parti de l'action de Vaudreuil-Dorion	Dominic Lalonde	690	48.90
De la Seigneurie District (4)
Party	Council candidate	Vote	%
Parti de l'action de Vaudreuil-Dorion	Alexandre Ménard-Levasseur	656	61.60
Inspire Vaudreuil-Dorion	Benoît Giguère	409	38.40
Des Chenaux District (5)
Party	Council candidate	Vote	%
Parti de l'action de Vaudreuil-Dorion	Nancy Dallaire	617	66.77
Inspire Vaudreuil-Dorion	Eric Girard	307	33.23
Saint-Michel District (6)
Party	Council candidate	Vote	%
Parti de l'action de Vaudreuil-Dorion	Sarah Champagne	698	62.83
Inspire Vaudreuil-Dorion	Sheldon Burgoa	413	37.17
Desrochers District (7)
Party	Council candidate	Vote	%
Inspire Vaudreuil-Dorion	Vanessa Leduc	627	59.15
Parti de l'action de Vaudreuil-Dorion	Zoulikha Benfares	433	40.85
De la Baie District (8)
Party	Council candidate	Vote	%
Parti de l'action de Vaudreuil-Dorion	John McRae	744	54.35
Inspire Vaudreuil-Dorion	Marie-Claude Nolin	625	45.65

=== Verchères ===
Mayoral candidate	Vote	%
Katherine R. L'Heureux	1,144	50.24
Alexandre Bélisle (X)	1,133	49.76

== Centre-du-Québec ==
=== Bécancour ===
Mayoral candidate	Vote	%
Pascal Blondin	3,366	58.32
Lucie Allard (X)	2,406	41.68

=== Drummondville ===
==== Mayor ====
Mayoral candidate	Vote	%
Jean-François Houle	6,239	29.70
David Bélanger	5,636	26.83
Alain Carrier	4,354	20.73
Alexandre Desbiens	2,726	12.98
Éric Beaupré	1,995	9.50
Raynald Theriault	54	0.26

==== Drummondville City Council ====
Candidate	Vote	%
District 1
Marc-André Lemire (X)	1,030	58.00
Sammy Pelletier	746	42.00
District 2
Marie-Josée Lemaire	1,161	54.64
Louis-Philippe Harnois-Arel	519	24.42
Amélie Durepos	445	20.94
District 3
Catherine Lassonde (X)	824	55.83
Geneviève Béliveau	652	44.17
District 4
Carole Léger (X)	Acclaimed	
District 5
Sarah Saint-Cyr Lanoie (X)	1,175	68.51
Alain D'auteuil	540	31.49
District 6
Jean-Philippe Tessier (X)	1,389	75.61
David Valente	448	24.39
District 7
Isabelle Duchesne (X)	Acclaimed	
District 8
Caroline Allard	1,057	58.62
Yves Grondin (X)	746	41.38
District 9
Julie Létourneau (X)	Acclaimed	
District 10
Mario Sévigny (X)	651	46.73
Guy Nobert	419	30.08
Rosalie Dubé	323	23.19
District 11
Daniel Pelletier (X)	Acclaimed	
District 12
Cathy Bernier (X)	1,224	56.80
Pablo Desfossés	931	43.20

=== Nicolet ===
Mayoral candidate	Vote	%
Geneviève Dubois (X)	2,818	83.82
Sylvain Mercier	544	16.18

=== Plessisville ===
Mayoral candidate	Vote	%
Marc Morin	1,816	62.41
Marc Gendron	1,094	37.59

=== Princeville ===
Mayoral candidate	Vote	%
Raphaël Guérard	1,098	50.09
Gilles Fortier (X)	756	34.49
Martin Sevegny	338	15.42

=== Victoriaville ===
Mayoral candidate	Vote	%
Vincent Bourassa	9,197	64.27
André Guillemette	2,663	18.65
Richard Picard	2,112	14.79
Jean-Marc Angers	328	2.30

==== Victoriaville City Council ====
Candidate	Vote	%
du Parc-de-L'Amitié District (1)
Caroline Pilon (X)	1,088	65.19
Philippe Dufour	581	34.81
du Parc-de-L'Île District (2)
Mariska Labarre	708	39.09
José Boisvert	650	35.89
Eve Champagne	271	14.96
Alexandre Mercier	182	10.05
Charles-Édouard-Mailhot District (3)
Olivier Bergeron	580	44.11
Martine Savoie	565	42.97
Serge Lavergne	170	12.93
Sainte-Famille District (4)
Alexandre Côté (X)	Acclaimed	
du Parc-Terre-des-Jeunes District (5)
Yanick Poisson (X)	Acclaimed	
du Parc-Victoria District (6)
Jean-François Lépine	630	51.85
Marc Morin (X)	570	46.91
Sotirios Papadimitriou	15	1.23
Sainte-Victoire District (7)
Yannick Fréchette (X)	936	60.50
Guillaume Ouellet	404	26.12
Charles Rioux-Méthot	207	13.38
Arthabaska-Nord District (8)
Chantal Moreau (X)	1,058	65.71
Marie-Élaine Goyette	552	34.29
Arthabaska-Ouest District (9)
Christian Rayes	Acclaimed	
Arthabaska-Est District (10)
Daniel Comtois	895	61.68
James Casey (X)	556	38.32

== Prefectural (warden) elections ==
=== Kamouraska ===
2025 Quebec municipal elections: Kamouraska Regional County Municipality
Candidate	Popular vote			Expenditures
Candidate	Votes	%	±%	Expenditures
Nancy Dubé	3,416	73.64		
Sylvain Roy (X)	1,223	26.36		
Total valid votes				
Total rejected, unmarked and declined votes				
Turnout				
Eligible voters	17,266			
Note: Candidate campaign colours, unless a member of a party, are based on the prominent colour used in campaign items (signs, literature, etc.) or colours used in polling graphs and are used as a visual differentiation between candidates.

=== La Haute-Gaspésie ===
2025 Quebec municipal elections: La Haute-Gaspésie Regional County Municipality
Candidate	Popular vote			Expenditures
Candidate	Votes	%	±%	Expenditures
Sylvain Tanguay	2,343	59.42		
Marie Gratton	1,035	26.25		
Maxime Esther Bouchard	565	14.33		
Total valid votes				
Total rejected, unmarked and declined votes				
Turnout				
Eligible voters	9,625			
Note: Candidate campaign colours, unless a member of a party, are based on the prominent colour used in campaign items (signs, literature, etc.) or colours used in polling graphs and are used as a visual differentiation between candidates.

=== La Matapédia ===
2025 Quebec municipal elections: La Matapédia Regional County Municipality
Candidate	Popular vote			Expenditures
Candidate	Votes	%	±%	Expenditures
Chantale Lavoie (X)	Acclaimed			
Total valid votes				
Total rejected, unmarked and declined votes				
Turnout				
Eligible voters	14,553			
Note: Candidate campaign colours, unless a member of a party, are based on the prominent colour used in campaign items (signs, literature, etc.) or colours used in polling graphs and are used as a visual differentiation between candidates.

=== La Vallée-de-la-Gatineau ===
2025 Quebec municipal elections: La Vallée-de-la-Gatineau Regional County Municipality
Candidate	Popular vote			Expenditures
Candidate	Votes	%	±%	Expenditures
Chantal Lamarche (X)	5,528	70.65		
Denis Côté	2,297	29.35		
Total valid votes				
Total rejected, unmarked and declined votes				
Turnout				
Eligible voters	19,552			
Note: Candidate campaign colours, unless a member of a party, are based on the prominent colour used in campaign items (signs, literature, etc.) or colours used in polling graphs and are used as a visual differentiation between candidates.

=== Le Domaine-du-Roy ===
2025 Quebec municipal elections: Le Domaine-du-Roy Regional County Municipality
Candidate	Popular vote			Expenditures
Candidate	Votes	%	±%	Expenditures
Yanick Baillargeon (X)	8,086	71.32		
Guy Larouche	3,251	28.68		
Total valid votes				
Total rejected, unmarked and declined votes				
Turnout				
Eligible voters	25,059			
Note: Candidate campaign colours, unless a member of a party, are based on the prominent colour used in campaign items (signs, literature, etc.) or colours used in polling graphs and are used as a visual differentiation between candidates.

=== Le Granit ===
2025 Quebec municipal elections: Le Granit Regional County Municipality
Candidate	Popular vote			Expenditures
Candidate	Votes	%	±%	Expenditures
Monique Phérivong Lenoir (X)	Acclaimed			
Total valid votes				
Total rejected, unmarked and declined votes				
Turnout				
Eligible voters				

=== Le Haut-Saint-François ===
2025 Quebec municipal elections: Le Haut-Saint-François Regional County Municipality
Candidate	Popular vote			Expenditures
Candidate	Votes	%	±%	Expenditures
Robert G. Roy (X)	4,184	73.08		
Jean-François Lapointe	1,541	26.92		
Total valid votes				
Total rejected, unmarked and declined votes				
Turnout				
Eligible voters	19,452			
Note: Candidate campaign colours, unless a member of a party, are based on the prominent colour used in campaign items (signs, literature, etc.) or colours used in polling graphs and are used as a visual differentiation between candidates.

=== Le Rocher-Percé ===
2025 Quebec municipal elections: Le Rocher-Percé Regional County Municipality
Candidate	Popular vote			Expenditures
Candidate	Votes	%	±%	Expenditures
Samuel Parisé (X)	Acclaimed			
Total valid votes				
Total rejected, unmarked and declined votes				
Turnout				
Eligible voters				
Note: Candidate campaign colours, unless a member of a party, are based on the prominent colour used in campaign items (signs, literature, etc.) or colours used in polling graphs and are used as a visual differentiation between candidates.

=== Les Basques ===
2025 Quebec municipal elections: Les Basques Regional County Municipality
Candidate	Popular vote			Expenditures
Candidate	Votes	%	±%	Expenditures
Gabriel Belzile	2,498	60.87		
Roger Martin	579	14.11		
Denis Marcoux	577	14.06		
Éric Dubois	450	10.96		
Total valid votes				
Total rejected, unmarked and declined votes				
Turnout				
Eligible voters	7,600			
Note: Candidate campaign colours, unless a member of a party, are based on the prominent colour used in campaign items (signs, literature, etc.) or colours used in polling graphs and are used as a visual differentiation between candidates.

=== Les Collines-de-l'Outaouais ===
2025 Quebec municipal elections: Les Collines-de-l'Outaouais Regional County Municipality
Party	Candidate	Popular vote			Expenditures
Party	Candidate	Votes	%	±%	Expenditures
Independent	Marc Carrière	Acclaimed	–	–	none listed
Total valid votes		–	–		
Total rejected, unmarked and declined votes		–	–		
Turnout		–	–	–	
Eligible voters		42,697			
Note: Candidate campaign colours, unless a member of a party, are based on the prominent colour used in campaign items (signs, literature, etc.) or colours used in polling graphs and are used as a visual differentiation between candidates.
Sources: Les Collines-de-l'Outaouais Regional County Municipality

=== Les Pays-d'en-Haut ===
2025 Quebec municipal elections: Les Pays-d'en-Haut Regional County Municipality
Candidate	Popular vote			Expenditures
Candidate	Votes	%	±%	Expenditures
Catherine Hamé	9,217	51.13		
Richard Darveau	3,107	17.24		
Martin Nadon	2,589	14.36		
Marie-Ève Ouellette	1,720	9.54		
Rosa Borreggine	1,394	7.73		
Total valid votes	18,027			
Total rejected, unmarked and declined votes	532			
Turnout	40.92			
Eligible voters	45,359			
Note: Candidate campaign colours, unless a member of a party, are based on the prominent colour used in campaign items (signs, literature, etc.) or colours used in polling graphs and are used as a visual differentiation between candidates.

=== Manicouagan ===
2025 Quebec municipal elections: Manicouagan Regional County Municipality
Candidate	Popular vote			Expenditures
Candidate	Votes	%	±%	Expenditures
Guillaume Tremblay	7,485	84.14		
Gilles Babin	1,411	15.86		
Total valid votes				
Total rejected, unmarked and declined votes				
Turnout				
Eligible voters	23,678			
Note: Candidate campaign colours, unless a member of a party, are based on the prominent colour used in campaign items (signs, literature, etc.) or colours used in polling graphs and are used as a visual differentiation between candidates.

=== Maria-Chapdelaine ===
2025 Quebec municipal elections: Maria-Chapdelaine Regional County Municipality
Candidate	Popular vote			Expenditures
Candidate	Votes	%	±%	Expenditures
Jean Morency	5,433	65.72		
Luc Simard (X)	2,834	34.28		
Total valid votes				
Total rejected, unmarked and declined votes				
Turnout				
Eligible voters	23,678			
Note: Candidate campaign colours, unless a member of a party, are based on the prominent colour used in campaign items (signs, literature, etc.) or colours used in polling graphs and are used as a visual differentiation between candidates.

=== Matawinie ===
2025 Quebec municipal elections: Matawinie Regional County Municipality
Candidate	Popular vote			Expenditures
Candidate	Votes	%	±%	Expenditures
Isabelle Perreault (X)	Acclaimed			
Total valid votes				
Total rejected, unmarked and declined votes				
Turnout				
Eligible voters	52,668			
Note: Candidate campaign colours, unless a member of a party, are based on the prominent colour used in campaign items (signs, literature, etc.) or colours used in polling graphs and are used as a visual differentiation between candidates.

=== Minganie ===
2025 Quebec municipal elections: Minganie Regional County Municipality
Candidate	Popular vote			Expenditures
Candidate	Votes	%	±%	Expenditures
Meggie Richard (X)	Acclaimed			
Total valid votes				
Total rejected, unmarked and declined votes				
Turnout				
Eligible voters	5,191			
Note: Candidate campaign colours, unless a member of a party, are based on the prominent colour used in campaign items (signs, literature, etc.) or colours used in polling graphs and are used as a visual differentiation between candidates.

=== Montcalm ===
2025 Quebec municipal elections: Montcalm Regional County Municipality
Candidate	Popular vote			Expenditures
Candidate	Votes	%	±%	Expenditures
Patrick Massé (X)	8,838	62.80		
Gilles Dubé	5,235	37.20		
Total valid votes	14,072			
Total rejected, unmarked and declined votes	1,032			
Turnout	30.56			
Eligible voters	49,423			
Note: Candidate campaign colours, unless a member of a party, are based on the prominent colour used in campaign items (signs, literature, etc.) or colours used in polling graphs and are used as a visual differentiation between candidates.

=== Papineau ===
2025 Quebec municipal elections: Papineau Regional County Municipality
Candidate	Popular vote			Expenditures
Candidate	Votes	%	±%	Expenditures
Paul-André David	6,461	61.32		
Pierre Bernier	4,076	38.68		
Total valid votes				
Total rejected, unmarked and declined votes				
Turnout				
Eligible voters	24,831			
Note: Candidate campaign colours, unless a member of a party, are based on the prominent colour used in campaign items (signs, literature, etc.) or colours used in polling graphs and are used as a visual differentiation between candidates.

=== Pontiac ===
2025 Quebec municipal elections: Pontiac Regional County Municipality
Candidate	Popular vote			Expenditures
Candidate	Votes	%	±%	Expenditures
Jane Toller (X)	2,380	38.06		
Jean-Pierre Landry	1,748	27.95		
Josey Bouchard	1,659	26.53		
Bruno St-Cyr	467	7.47		
Total valid votes				
Total rejected, unmarked and declined votes				
Turnout				
Eligible voters	13,361			
Note: Candidate campaign colours, unless a member of a party, are based on the prominent colour used in campaign items (signs, literature, etc.) or colours used in polling graphs and are used as a visual differentiation between candidates.

=== Témiscamingue ===
2025 Quebec municipal elections: Témiscamingue Regional County Municipality
Candidate	Popular vote			Expenditures
Candidate	Votes	%	±%	Expenditures
Martin Lefebvre	3,547	91.89		
Renald Baril	313	8.11		
Total valid votes				
Total rejected, unmarked and declined votes				
Turnout				
Eligible voters	12,891			
Note: Candidate campaign colours, unless a member of a party, are based on the prominent colour used in campaign items (signs, literature, etc.) or colours used in polling graphs and are used as a visual differentiation between candidates.

=== Témiscouata ===
2025 Quebec municipal elections: Témiscouata Regional County Municipality
Candidate	Popular vote			Expenditures
Candidate	Votes	%	±%	Expenditures
Serge Pelletier (X)	5,325	69.08		
Jasmin Roy-Rouleau	2,384	30.92		
Total valid votes				
Total rejected, unmarked and declined votes				
Turnout				
Eligible voters	17,037			
Note: Candidate campaign colours, unless a member of a party, are based on the prominent colour used in campaign items (signs, literature, etc.) or colours used in polling graphs and are used as a visual differentiation between candidates.

== See also ==
- Municipal elections in Canada
- Electronic voting in Canada
