= Andrée Bouchard =

Canadian politician

Mayor of Saint-Jean-sur-Richelieu
- In office November 15, 2021 – November 10, 2025
- Preceded by: Alain Laplante
- Succeeded by: Éric Latour

Prefect of Le Haut-Richelieu Regional County Municipality
- In office November 22, 2023 – November 26, 2025
- Preceded by: Réal Ryan
- Succeeded by: Éric Latour

Personal details
- Party: Équipe Andrée Bouchard

Andrée Bouchard is a Canadian politician. She was the mayor of Saint-Jean-sur-Richelieu, Quebec and prefect of Le Haut-Richelieu Regional County Municipality from 2021 to 2025. She was the first female mayor of the city and the second female prefect of the MRC.

== Early career ==
Since 1997 she has been a coordinator for the Association d’enseignantes en soins infirmiers au collégial.

From 2002 to 2019 she worked as an office agent for the Cégep de Saint-Jean-sur-Richelieu.

From 2003 to 2020 she served as the president of the Commission scolaire des Hautes-Rivières.

== Mayoral run ==
In the Fall of 2020, Bouchard announced she was going to run for mayor of Saint-Jean-sur-Richelieu in the 2021 municipal election, and would form a municipal political party in the process. She stated that she wanted to focus on services to citizens and the management of public finances and a new conservation plan. On election day, Bouchard defeated incumbent mayor Alain Laplante by 8,861 votes, winning 64 per cent of the vote in the process. In addition to herself, her party (Équipe Andrée Bouchard) saw 11 of its 12 candidates elected to city council. She became the first female mayor of the city, and also saw the election of a majority female council. Laplante's party did not win any seats. One of the themes of the election was the debate between economic growth and environmental preservation. Laplante campaigned on being a 'defender of the environment', and wanted to protect agricultural land in the city from urban sprawl. Bouchard supported talking to developers, and stated the city had been 'stagnating... as if economic development has stopped'. She supported attracting businesses and industries, and developing the Saint-Jean Airport area.

== Mayoralty ==
Following her election as mayor, she was elected as prefect for Le Haut-Richelieu Regional County Municipality by members of the Regional County council.

As mayor, she had to deal with a water pipe break in the city which deprived half the population of running water. On November 29, 2023, she declared a local state of emergency due to the rupture. She has also been involved in negotiations to bring the Réseau express métropolitain (REM) to the city.

Since her election, she has faced several members of her party quitting to become independents on council to the point where her party now has a minority of seats. It has been seen that her party was more of a coalition built to defeat the previous mayor's administration rather than one built to cohesively run the city. The first defection cam in July 2022 when François Roy left he party citing a difference in vision in the city's development. Councillor Jessica Racine-Lehoux left the party in January 2024. In May 2024, Jean Fontaine was expelled from the party following disagreements between him and the mayor. Later in the month, Mélanie Dufresne left the party after criticizing the mayor and her team for not consulting elected officials on decisions. The next month, two more councillors left the party. First, Jérémie Meunier left, citing a lack of leadership and vision with the Bouchard administration as well as policy disagreements. A few days later, Claire Charbonneau left the party citing similar reasons and a lack of economic development. Then Marco Savard left a few weeks later, stating the "bonds of trust have been broken", followed by Sébastien Gaudette who left stating "the mayor's office agenda was incompatible with my own", leaving her party with just three seats.

In August 2024, she penned an open letter to citizens in Le Canada Français, making a heartfelt plea to draw attention to verbal attacks that were being made toward her by the public, such as suggesting that she was sleeping with developers, or calling her a "princess", "hypocrite" and "manipulative".

In June 2024, she announced she would run for re-election in the 2025 Quebec municipal elections. She was defeated by Éric Latour, finishing in a distant third place with just 12% of the vote. Her party won one seat on council.
