= Alain Laplante =

Canadian politician

Mayor of Saint-Jean-sur-Richelieu Suspended (May 6-August 9, 2020)
- In office November 13, 2017 – November 15, 2021
- Preceded by: Michel Fecteau
- Succeeded by: Andrée Bouchard

Saint-Jean-sur-Richelieu City Councillor
- In office November, 2009 – November 2013
- Preceded by: Michelle Power
- Succeeded by: Claire Charbonneau
- Constituency: District 11

Personal details
- Born: 1971 (age 54–55) Iberville, Quebec
- Party: Équipe Dolbec (2009); Équipe Alain Laplante (2013–present)
- Spouse: Annie Ménard
- Children: 4

Alain Laplante (born 1971) is a Canadian politician. He was the mayor of Saint-Jean-sur-Richelieu, Quebec from 2017 to 2021.

Laplante was born in Iberville, Quebec, now part of the city of Saint-Jean-sur-Richelieu. He attended high school at Polyvalente Marcel-Landry. He has a human sciences diploma from Cégep de Saint-Jean-sur-Richelieu, a bachelor's degree in economics from Université de Sherbrooke and studied political science at Université du Québec à Montréal.

After his studies, Laplante became an assistant researcher at Université de Sherbrooke or two years, then became an teacher's and research assistant at Université du Québec à Montréal for a year. In 1998, he came president of Maison Objectif, a market research company. In 1997 he became the executive assistant to Claude Bachand, who was Saint-Jean's Bloc Québécois Member of Parliament. He worked for Bachand for five years before becoming the Director General of Main Streets in Old Saint-Jean in 2002. In 2009, he was elected to Saint-Jean City Council in District 11 as a member of Équipe Dolbec, the party of incumbent mayor Gilles Dolbec. He served on council until running for mayor in 2013. In the 2013 mayoral election, Laplante finished third with 19% of the vote behind Michel Fecteau, and his former boss, Claude Bachand. Despite winning the support of fewer than 1 in 5 voters, he came just under 900 votes from winning what was a tight four-way race. His new party, Équipe Alain Laplante elected one member to city council. Laplante again ran for mayor in 2017, this time defeating Fecteau and Bachand. Laplante won 39% of the vote, nearly 900 votes ahead of Fecteau. Despite the win, his party only won three of 12 districts in the city council election. Following his election, Laplante was able to govern with a narrow majority on the council with the help of three independents. However, after a few months, the independents began voting with the opposition Équipe Fecteau party.

Without a majority on council, Laplante came under fire after hiring a friend, Guy Grenier as an attaché to his cabinet. The majority opposition on council, known as the "Group of Nine" attempted to fire Grenier, but was stopped by Laplante's veto. In response, City Council voted to change the rules to allow them the right to hire and fire city employees. The Commission municipale du Québec intervened, and the case was eventually taken to the Superior Court of Quebec, which ruled in 2020 that Laplante would be suspended from his duties for 95 days. He was suspended from office from May 6, to August 9, 2020. During this time, councillor Claire Charbonneau served as acting mayor until May 19, when she resigned after being verbally insulted. Yvan Berthelot then served as acting mayor. The mayor came under more controversy in 2021 when opposition councillors filed a lawsuit against 9 citizens, accusing them of "monopolizing the public question period at city council, insulting elected officials and staff on Facebook and drowning the municipal administration with requestions for information". The lawsuit suggested that the actions of these citizens are part of an organized effort of the mayor in an attempt to win a majority on council in the next elections. Laplante countered with a lawsuit of his own.

Laplante was defeated in the 2021 mayoral election.
