= Éric Latour =

Canadian politician

His Worship Éric Latour

Mayor of Saint-Jean-sur-Richelieu
- Incumbent
- Assumed office November 10, 2025
- Preceded by: Andrée Bouchard

Prefect of Le Haut-Richelieu Regional County Municipality
- Incumbent
- Assumed office November 26, 2025
- Preceded by: Andrée Bouchard

Personal details
- Born: Saint-Jean-sur-Richelieu, Quebec
- Party: Coalition Éric Latour
- Spouse: Sylvie
- Children: 3
- Occupation: Journalist

Éric Latour is a Canadian politician. He has been mayor of Saint-Jean-sur-Richelieu, Quebec since 2025.

Prior to his election, Latour worked as a journalist, a TV host and a radio host. Notably, he was the manager of the local BOOM-FM radio station, CFZZ-FM.

== Mayoral campaign ==
In the Fall of 2024, Lautour announced his candidacy for mayor of Saint-Jean-sur-Richelieu for the 2025 mayoral election, ending 10 years of speculation. At the time, BOOM-FM was in process of being sold by Bell Media. After announcing his candidacy, Latour promised that if elected, his office would "remain impartial and represent all elected officials", highlighting the crisis in the city's city council, which saw a "breakdown in communication" over the previous term. He ran on platform of four planks; infrastructure, housing, economic development and the environment. He was especially focused on a platform of dealing with the housing and homelessness crisis, which a particularly pressing issue, as the city was considered the "capital of the housing crisis".

During the campaign, he was criticized for accepting free assistance from an excavation company which helped prepare and put up election signs, which could be seen as being an office under the Act respecting elections and referendums in municipalities. Latour denounced the accusations by stating "an anonymous scumbag is trying to poison the end of this campaign and mislead voters", and called it a "smear campaign".

Latour was elected to office in the 2025 municipal election. defeating his nearest rival, Maryline Charbonneau by 1% of the vote, and nearly 10,000 votes ahead of incumbent mayor Andrée Bouchard. His party, Coalition Éric Latour, won eight of 12 seats on council.

== Mayoralty ==
Shortly after his election, the mayors of Le Haut-Richelieu Regional County Municipality elected him as the region's prefect.

After 100 days in office, Latour stated that the opening of a homeless shelter was one of his biggest accomplishments. He had also been appointed to the Standing Committee on Economic Development, the Standing Committee of Regional County Municipalities, and the Political and Technical Committee on Homelessness in the Union of Quebec Municipalities.
