= 2025 Laval municipal election =

Election in Quebec, Canada

- Mayoral election
← 2021	November 2, 2025	2029 →
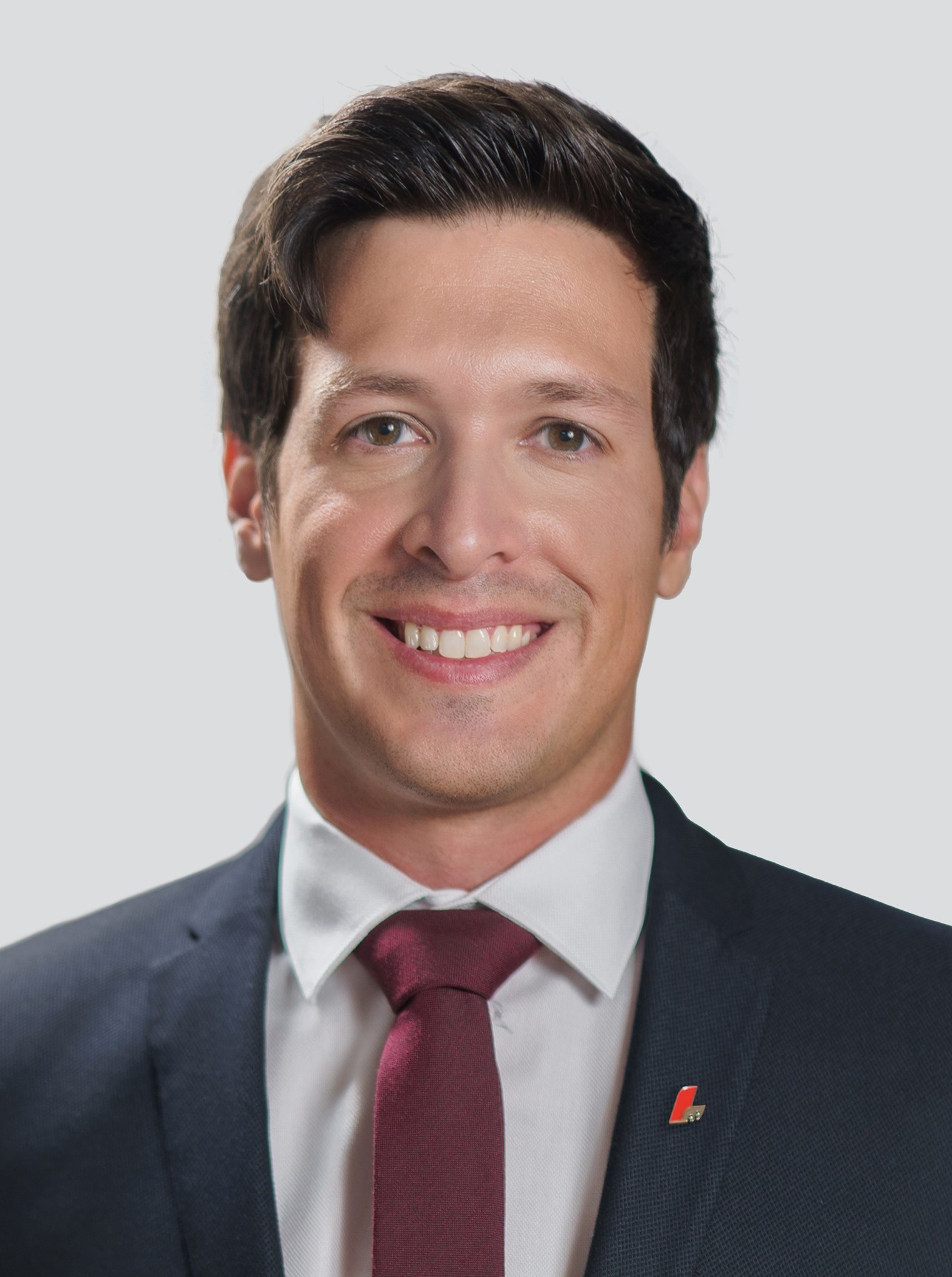

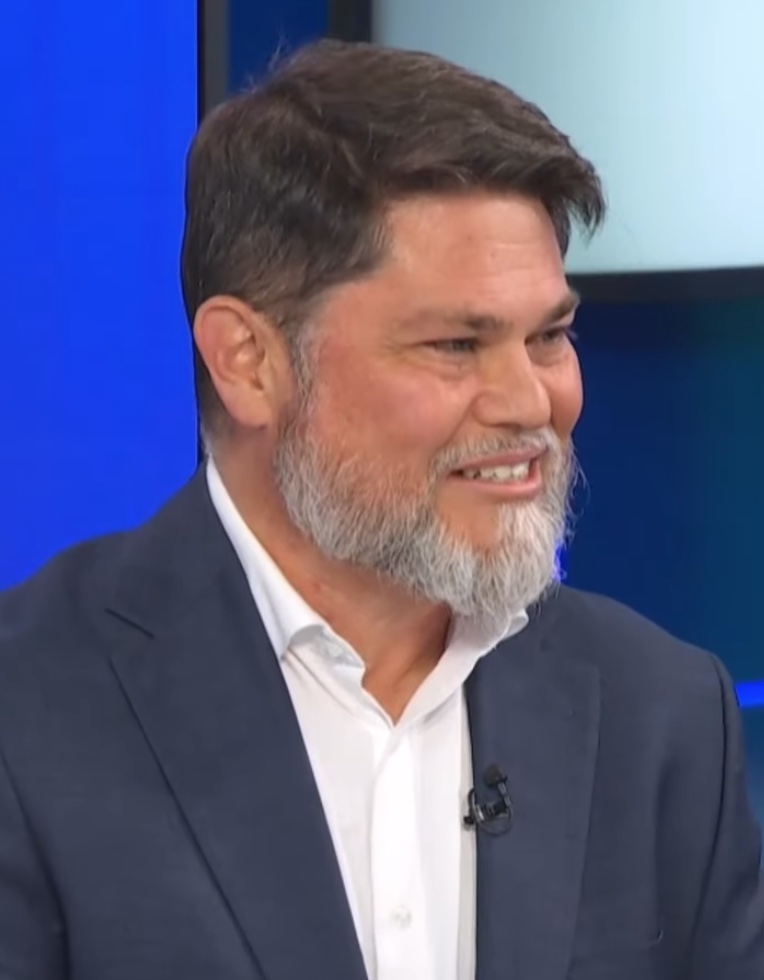
		PL
Nominee	Stéphane Boyer	Claude Larochelle	Frédéric Mayer
Party	Mouvement lavallois	Parti Laval	Action Laval
Popular vote	58,013	21,432	19,091
Percentage	58.87%	21.75%	19.37%
Mayor before election
Stéphane Boyer
Mouvement lavallois
Elected mayor
Stéphane Boyer
Mouvement lavallois
- City Council election
← 2021	November 2, 2025	2029 →
- 22 seats on Laval City Council; 12 seats needed for a majority
Party	Leader	Vote %	Seats	+/–
Mouvement lavallois	Stéphane Boyer		17	+3
Action Laval	Frédéric Mayer		2	−3
Parti Laval	Claude Larochelle		2	0
Independent	—		1	+1
This lists parties that won seats. See the complete results below.
Results map

The 2025 Laval municipal election took place on November 2, 2025, to elect the mayor and city council in Laval, Quebec, Canada. Incumbent mayor Stéphane Boyer ran for re-election.

== City Council ==
=== District 1 - Saint-François ===
Party	Candidate	Vote	%
Action Laval	Isabelle Piché (X)	2,673	61.25
Mouvement lavallois	Francis Létourneau	1,165	26.70
Parti Laval	Isabel Dion	526	12.05

=== District 2 - Saint-Vincent-de-Paul ===
Party	Candidate	Vote	%
Mouvement lavallois	Annick Senghor	2,022	39.38
Independent	Paolo Galati (X)	1,671	32.54
Parti Laval	Yann Caron	795	15.48
Action Laval	Lorenzo Lagatta	647	12.60

=== District 3 - Duvernay ===
Party	Candidate	Vote	%
Mouvement lavallois	Anick Brunet	2,301	44.03
Action Laval	Achille Cifelli (X)	2,030	38.84
Parti Laval	Guillaume Lajoie	895	17.13

=== District 4 - Pont-Viau ===
Party	Candidate	Vote	%
Mouvement lavallois	Christine Poirier (X)	2,960	74.54
Parti Laval	Redouane Yahmi	548	13.80
Action Laval	Matthew Cammisano	463	11.66

=== District 5 - Marigot ===
Party	Candidate	Vote	%
Mouvement lavallois	Cecilia Macedo (X)	2,289	65.34
Parti Laval	Frédérique Brunet-Maheu	634	18.10
Action Laval	Patria Almonte	580	16.56

=== District 6 - Laval-des-Rapides ===
Party	Candidate	Vote	%
Mouvement lavallois	Martin Fiola	1,659	36.10
Independent	Pierre Anthian	1,335	29.05
Action Laval	Youssef Jarjour	873	19.00
Parti Laval	Martine Lanoue	728	15.84

=== District 7 - Renaud-Coursol ===
Party	Candidate	Vote	%
Mouvement lavallois	Seta Topouzian (X)	2,026	54.39
Action Laval	Saadia Brini	895	24.03
Parti Laval	Wassim Mekideche	804	21.58

=== District 8 - Vimont ===
Party	Candidate	Vote	%
Mouvement lavallois	Pierre Brabant (X)	3,006	55.41
Action Laval	Stefano Piscitelli	1,682	31.00
Parti Laval	Liria Serrano	737	13.59

=== District 9 - Saint-Bruno ===
Party	Candidate	Vote	%
Action Laval	David De Cotis (X)	2,781	48.53
Mouvement lavallois	Justin Boisvert	2,108	36.78
Parti Laval	Stéphane Bélanger	842	14.69

=== District 10 - Auteuil ===
Party	Candidate	Vote	%
Mouvement lavallois	Sylvain Yelle	2,680	53.74
Parti Laval	Marielle Cormouls-Houlès	1,300	26.07
Action Laval	Melissa Annisi Palmieri	852	17.08
Independent	Michel Cantin	155	3.11

=== District 11 - Le Carrefour ===
Party	Candidate	Vote	%
Mouvement lavallois	Mohamed Bâ	1,987	57.11
Action Laval	Daniel Legault	1,035	29.75
Parti Laval	Romina Rajabi	457	13.14

=== District 12 - Souvenir-Labelle ===
Party	Candidate	Vote	%
Mouvement lavallois	Sandra El-Helou (X)	2,456	68.20
Parti Laval	Michèle Larose	787	21.86
Action Laval	Carl-Henri Volcy	358	9.94

=== District 13 - L'Abord-à-Plouffe ===
Party	Candidate	Vote	%
Mouvement lavallois	Vasilios Karidogiannis (X)	1,965	61.10
Action Laval	Maria Pagano	704	21.89
Parti Laval	Marie-Josée Duval	547	17.01

=== District 14 - Chomedey ===
Party	Candidate	Vote	%
Independent	Aglaia Revelakis (X)	1,143	34.36
Action Laval	Costa Deeb	1,105	33.21
Mouvement lavallois	Denitsa Dimitrova	654	19.66
Parti Laval	Sally Radwan	425	12.77

=== District 15 - Saint-Martin ===
Party	Candidate	Vote	%
Mouvement lavallois	Aline Dib (X)	1,774	48.42
Action Laval	Peter Karampatos	1,313	35.84
Parti Laval	Aaron Rodriguez	516	14.08
Progrès Laval	Marco Mellado	61	1.66

=== District 16 - Sainte-Dorothée ===
Party	Candidate	Vote	%
Mouvement lavallois	Ray Khalil (X)	2,323	43.05
Action Laval	James Lee Bissi	2,110	39.10
Parti Laval	Valérie Rancourt	963	17.85

=== District 17 - Laval-les-Îles ===
Party	Candidate	Vote	%
Mouvement lavallois	Nicholas Borne (X)	2,965	58.89
Action Laval	François Pilon	1,084	21.53
Parti Laval	Michel Trottier	986	19.58

=== District 18 - L'Orée-des-Bois ===
Party	Candidate	Vote	%
Mouvement lavallois	Yannick Langlois (X)	3,058	62.32
Parti Laval	Julie Beaulieu	1,177	23.99
Action Laval	Nancy Celestin	672	13.69

=== District 19 - Marc-Aurèle-Fortin ===
Party	Candidate	Vote	%
Parti Laval	Louise Lortie (X)	2,552	53.65
Mouvement lavallois	Emmanuelle Provost	1,982	41.66
Action Laval	Juan Schneider	223	4.69

=== District 20 - Champfleury ===
Party	Candidate	Vote	%
Mouvement lavallois	Carole St-Denis	3,188	59.06
Parti Laval	Simon-Nicolas Grandmaître	1,858	34.42
Action Laval	Joseph Flaubert Duclair	352	6.52

=== District 21 - Sainte-Rose ===
Party	Candidate	Vote	%
Mouvement lavallois	Flavia Alexandra Novac (X)	3,655	68.27
Parti Laval	Tommy Vallée	1,398	26.11
Action Laval	Dilan Battal	301	5.62

=== District 22 - Fabreville-Sud ===
Party	Candidate	Vote	%
Parti Laval	Martin Vaillancourt	1,772	44.48
Mouvement lavallois	Perry Niro	1,559	39.13
Action Laval	Philippe Njomo Ngassa	450	11.30
Progrès Laval	Leina Flores	203	5.10
