= List of covered bridges in Quebec =

Map

In 2012 in Quebec, there were 82 covered bridges down from more than 1,200 in the early 1900s.

== Existing bridges ==
All bridges are single span, and single lane, unless noted. All are of the construction type Quebec modified Town lattice unless noted. Some are registered with the Department Cultural Heritage (CPCQ) of the Ministry of Culture and Communications.

Name	Region	Municipality	Coordinates	Length (m)	Built	Notes
Pont Alphonse-Normandin	Abitibi-Témiscamingue	Saint-Dominique-du-Rosaire	48°44′04″N 78°09′49″W	40	1950	Named after the first pioneer to arrive, in 1923.
Pont Champagne	Abitibi-Temiscamingue	Val-d'Or	48°12′53″N 77°55′32″W	32	1941	Named for a family that worked on the construction.
Pont de l'Arche de Noé	Abitibi-Temiscamingue	La Morandière-Rochebaucourt	48°38′46″N 77°39′3″W	39	1937	Closed to traffic.
Pont de l’Île	Abitibi-Temiscamingue	Clerval	48°41′30″N 79°24′27″W	52	1946	Two spans with a central pier. Not registered with the CPCQ.
Pont de l'Orignal	Abitibi-Temiscamingue	La Morandière-Rochebaucourt	48°42′17″N 77°33′14″W	33	1942	Not registered with the CPCQ.
Pont Dénommée	Abitibi-Temiscamingue	Saint-Bruno-de-Guigues	47°29′05″N 79°24′26″W	30	1933	Named for pioneer Albert Dénommée. Closed to traffic in winter.
Pont des Chutes	Abitibi-Temiscamingue	La Morandière-Rochebaucourt	48°42′17″N 77°26′41″W	64	1954	Closed to traffic. Two spans, with a central pier. Not registered with the CPCQ.
Pont du Petit-Quatre	Abitibi-Temiscamingue	Clermont	48°54′29″N 79°19′35″W	32	1950	Restored in 2012.
Pont Émery-Sicard	Abitibi-Temiscamingue	Saint-Maurice-de-Dalquier	48°38′36″N 78°00′18″W	66	1946	Two spans. Named for a local sawmill owner.
Pont Landry	Abitibi-Temiscamingue	Latulipe-et-Gaboury	47°23′49″N 79°02′50″W	33	1938	Named for a local family.
Pont Leclerc	Abitibi-Temiscamingue	La Sarre	48°50′11″N 79°16′33″W	25	1927	Named for a local pioneer family.
Pont Levasseur	Abitibi-Temiscamingue	Authier-Nord	Authier-Nord 48°50′07″N 78°53′22″W	39	1928	Closed in summer. Named for a local landowner.
Pont Molesworth	Abitibi-Temiscamingue	Macamic	48°44′56″N 78°59′39″W	35	1930	Two spans. Name for the former name of the Loïs river, which it spans.
Pont Perreault	Beauce	Notre-Dame-des-Pins	46.18264871290244°N 70.716691600481°W	150.9	1929	
Bridge Falls Neigette	Bas-Saint-Laurent	Saint-Anaclet-de-Lessard	48°27′5″N 68°18′53″W		1933	
fr:Pont Beauséjour	Bas-Saint-Laurent	Amqui	48°27′58″N 67°26′0″W		1932	
fr:Pont Bélanger	Bas-Saint-Laurent	Métis-sur-Mer	48°38′8″N 67°54′20″W		1925	
fr:Pont de l'Anse-Saint-Jean	Bas-Saint-Laurent	Amqui	48°29′31″N 67°26′54″W		1931	
fr:Pont de Routhierville	Bas-Saint-Laurent	Routierville	48°10′56″N 67°8′57″W		1931	Historical Monument rated (2009)
fr:Pont des Draveurs (Rimouski)	Bas-Saint-Laurent	Rimouski	48°21′50″N 68°22′7″W		1930	
Pont du College	Bas-Saint-Laurent	La Pocatière	47°17′33″N 69°57′6″W		1919	Historical Monument city (2002)
fr:Pont François-Gagnon	Bas-Saint-Laurent	Saint-René-de-Matane	48°42′24″N 67°23′22″W		1942	
fr:Pont Heppell	Bas-Saint-Laurent	Causapscal	48°18′43″N 67°14′29″W		1909	Historical Monument city (2009)
fr:Pont Jean-Chassé	Bas-Saint-Laurent	Saint-René-de-Matane	48°43′12″N 67°24′50″W		1945	
Pont Pierre-Carrier	Bas-Saint-Laurent	Saint-Ulric	48°46′20″N 67°41′5″W		1918	
fr:Pont Romain-Caron	Bas-Saint-Laurent	Saint-Jean-de-la-Lande	47°23′43″N 68°43′13″W		1940	Historical Monument city (2006)
fr:Pont de Saint-Placide-de-Charlevoix	Capitale-Nationale	Baie-Saint-Paul	47°24′28″N 70°37′3″W		1926	Historical Monument city (2002)
Bridge Descormiers	Centre-du-Quebec	Saint-Rémi-de-Tingwick	45°53′51″N 71°46′38″W		1904	Perforated truss.
fr:Pont des Raymond	Centre-du-Quebec	Bécancour	46°15′36″N 72°24′8″W		1928	
Pont-Etienne Poirier	Centre-du-Quebec	Saint-Célestin	46°11′50″N 72°23′24″W		1905	
Lambert Bridge	Centre-du-Quebec	Sainte-Sophie-d'Halifax	46°7′41″N 71°45′55″W		1948	
fr:Pont Joseph-Édouard-Perrault	Centre-du-Quebec	Warwick	45°57′23″N 72°0′24″W		1929	Historical Monument city (1999)
fr:Pont Caron	Chaudière-Appalaches	Val-Alain	46°25′19″N 71°42′20″W		1933	
Pont Bolduc	Chaudière-Appalaches	Sainte-Clotilde-de-Beauce	46°7′43″N 70°59′15″W		1937	
fr:Pont des Défricheurs	Chaudière-Appalaches	Sainte-Lucie-de-Beauregard	46°45′15″N 70°03′33″W		1936	
fr:Pont du Sault	Chaudière-Appalaches	Saint-Adalbert	46°55′08″N 69°53′46″W		1943	
fr:Pont Perrault	Chaudière-Appalaches	Notre-Dame-des-Pins	46°10′57″N 70°43′1″W		1928	Historical Monument rated (2004)
Pont Rouge (Sainte-Agathe-de-Lotbinière)	Chaudière-Appalaches	Sainte-Agathe-de-Lotbinière	46°19′50″N 71°24′53″W		1928	Historical Monument city (2006)
fr:Pont Saint-André	Chaudière-Appalaches	Saint-Sylvestre	46°21′34″N 71°19′14″W		1927	
Pont-Émile Lapointe	Côte-Nord	Pointe-aux-Outardes	49°5′41″N 68°18′38″W		1945	
Pont Louis-Gravel	Côte-Nord	Sacré-Coeur	48°16′4″N 69°54′31″W		1934	
fr:Pont Cousineau (Valcourt)	Estrie	Valcourt (city)	45°29′54″N 72°18′50″W		1888	
fr:Pont de la Frontière	Estrie	Potton	45°0′42″N 72°22′25″W		1896	Historical Monument city (2008)
fr:Pont de Milby	Estrie	Waterville	45°18′54″N 71°49′23″W		1873	Historical Monument city (1992)
fr:Pont d'Eustis	Estrie	Compton	45°18′11″N 71°54′48″W		1908	Multiple Perforations
fr:Pont Drouin	Estrie	Compton	45°15′50″N 71°51′5″W		1886	Multiple Perforations
fr:Pont John-Cook	Estrie	Cookshire-Eaton	45°25′19″N 71°37′57″W		1868	Medium Lattice
fr:Pont McDermott	Estrie	Cookshire-Eaton	45°23′34″N 71°33′22″W		1886	Multiple Perforations
fr:Pont McVetty-McKenzie	Estrie	Lingwick	45°37′10″N 71°23′42″W		1893	Heritage Site consisting (2003)
fr:Pont Narrows	Estrie	Canton Stanstead	45°5′32″N 72°12′3″W		1881	
fr:Pont de Saint-Edgar	Gaspésie–Îles-de-la-Madeleine	New Richmond	48°14′15″N 65°43′32″W		1938	Historical Monument rated (2009)
fr:Pont Galipeault (Grande-Vallée)	Gaspésie–Îles-de-la-Madeleine	Grande-Vallée	49°13′21″N 65°7′33″W		1923	
Pont Grandchamp	Lanaudière	Sainte-Geneviève-de-Berthier	46°5′35″N 73°12′41″W		1918	
Bridge Armand Lachaîne	Laurentides	Chute-Saint-Philippe	46°38′36″N 75°16′8″W		1906	
Red Bridge Farm East	Laurentides	Saint-Aimé-du-Lac-des-Îles	46°25′36″N 73°12′40″W		1903	Heritage recognized (1990)
Red Bridge Farm West	Laurentides	Saint-Aimé-du-Lac-des-Îles	46°25′36″N 75°25′44″W		1903	Heritage recognized (1990)
Bridge Macaza	Laurentides	La Macaza	46°21′24″N 74°46′46″W		1904	
Bridge Prud'homme	Laurentides	Brébeuf	46°4′22″N 74°37′30″W		1918	
Bordeleau Bridge	Mauricie	Saint-Séverin	46°40′24″N 72°33′28″W		1932	
fr:Pont de Saint-Mathieu	Mauricie	Saint-Mathieu-du-Parc	46°36′10″N 72°53′2″W		1936	Historical Monument city (2001)
fr:Pont Ducharme	Mauricie	La Bostonnais	47°31′11″N 72°40′51″W		1946	Historical Monument rated (2006)
fr:Pont Thiffault	Mauricie	La Bostonnais	47°33′45″N 72°38′15″W		1946	
fr:Pont Balthazar	Montérégie	Brigham	45°16′51″N 72°50′7″W		1932	
fr:Pont Decelles	Montérégie	Brigham	45°16′51″N 72°45′43″W		1938	
Powerscourt Covered Bridge	Montérégie	Hinchinbrooke	45°0′25″N 74°9′40″W		1861	McCallum truss. Historical Monument rated (1987)
fr:Pont des Rivières	Montérégie	Notre-Dame-de-Stanbridge	45°9′28″N 73°3′4″W		1884	Howe truss.
fr:Pont de Freeport	Montérégie	Cowansville	45°13′6″N 72°46′2″W		1870	
Pont Guthrie	Montérégie	Saint-Armand	45°3′56″N 72°57′29″W		1888	Medium Lattice
Bridge Traverse	Nord-du-Québec	Baie-James	49°11′1″N 79°10′42″W		~ 1940–1945	Medium Lattice
Pioneer Bridge	Nord-du-Québec	Baie-James	49°7′35″N 79°15′18″W		1943	
Bridge Memories	Nord-du-Québec	James Bay	49°2′19″N 79°10′47″W		1954	
Pont Maurice-Duplessis	Nord-du-Québec	Baie-James	49°4′4″N 79°10′30″W		1948	
Bridge Township Laas	Nord-du-Québec	Lebel-sur-Quévillon	48°59′1″N 77°9′28″W		1958	
fr:Pont Taschereau (Baie-James)	Nord-du-Québec	Baie-James	49°7′35″N 79°12′03″W		1939	
Bridge Cousineau (Gracefield)	Outaouais	Gracefield	46°3′57″N 76°6′27″W		1932	
Pont de l' Aigle	Outaouais	Egan-Sud	46°27′10″N 76°2′41″W		1925	
Meech Creek Bridge	Outaouais	Chelsea	45°34′57″N 75°53′45″W		1924	
Félix-Gabriel-Marchand Bridge	Outaouais	Fort-Coulonge	45°51′41″N 76°44′26″W		1898	Double Perforation truss. Historical Monument rated (1988)
Bridge Marois	Outaouais	Gracefield	46°7′8″N 76°56′34″W		1933	
fr:Pont Savoyard	Outaouais	Grand-Remous	46°35′30″N 75°55′48″W		1931	
fr:Pont du Faubourg	Saguenay-Lac-Saint-Jean	L'Anse-Saint-Jean	48°14′05″N 70°12′10″W		1929	
fr:Pont du Lac-Ha! Ha!	Saguenay-Lac-Saint-Jean	Fernand-et-Bolleau	48°04′0″N 70°49′27″W		1934	
Pont Rouge (Sainte-Jeanne d'Arc)	Saguenay-Lac-Saint-Jean	Sainte-Jeanne d'Arc	48°52′59″N 72°5′5″W		1936	

== Defunct bridges ==
Name	Location	Code	Farm	Built in	Disappeared in
Abitibi-Témiscamingue
fr:Pont Blanc (in ruins)	Chazel, Abitibi-Temiscamingue	P1-61-02	Medium Lattice		1947
Pont de la Calamité	La Sarre	61-02-04		1927	May 31, 2021 (Burnt)
Cameron Bridge	Saint-Eugène-de-Guigues	61–70–16	Modified Lattice	1923	1944 (Replaced by a concrete bridge)
Bridge Carrier	Val-d'Or	61–01–28	Modified Lattice	1955	August 18, 2011 (Burnt)
Bridge Chazel	Saint-Janvier (Chazel)	61–02–11	Modified Lattice	1935	August 30, 1996 (Burnt)
Bridge Despinassy	Lac-Despinassy	61–01–15	Modified Lattice	1949	1974 (Smashed by a too heavy truck)
Traverse Bridge	James Bay	61-02 P11-	Medium Lattice	1940–1945	2012 (carried away by the flood of spring)
Bridge Villemontel	Villemontel (Trécesson)	61–01–06	Modified Lattice	1950	1979 (carried away by the flood of spring)
Grassy Narrow Bridge	Moffet	61–70–12	Modified Lattice	~ 1950	1983 (Burned)
Bridge Panache	Amos (St-Félix-de-Dalquier)	61–01–21	Modified Lattice	1955	2006 (Burned)
Pont du Petit-Sept	Rouyn-Noranda (Cléricy)	61-02 P22 -	Medium Lattice	1950	1987 (Demolished)
Bridge Rank II	Launay	61–02–26	Modified Lattice	1922	1989 (Demolished by owner)
Bridge Village	Val-d'Or (Val-Senneville)	61–01–27	Modified Lattice	1944	1985 (Demolished in exchange for the restoration of the bridge Carrier)
Bridge Lavigne	Lac-Despinassy	61–01–31	Modified Lattice	1955	1983 (Burned)
Bridge Ojima	Saint-Eugène-de-Chazel (TNO Rivière-Ojima)	61–02–38	Modified Lattice	1953	1973 (illegally demolished for its timber)
Bridge Turgeon	Trécesson (Villemontel)	61–01–07	Modified Lattice	1953	1996 (Burned)
Bridge Vautrin	Preissac	61–01–08	Modified Lattice	1937	1983 (demolished for lack of money to maintain)
Bridge 61–01–59	Saint-Marc-de-Figuery	61–01–59	Modified Lattice	1914	~ 1955 (Demolished)
Bridge 61–02–31	Taschereau	61–02–31	Modified Lattice	N / A	1978 (Replaced by a modern bridge)
Bridge P21-61-02	Languedoc (TNO Rivière-Ojima)	61-02 P21-	Medium Lattice	N / A	1985 (Demolished)
Bridge P22 -61-02	Languedoc (TNO Rivière-Ojima)	61-02 P22 -	Medium Lattice	N / A	1985 (Demolished)
Bas-Saint-Laurent
Bridge Coulee Carrier	Matane	61–42–03	Modified Lattice	1936	2007 (destroyed by flood waters)
Bridge River Hâtée	Bic, merged with Rimouski	61–58–05	Modified Lattice	1936	1999 (Burned)
Bridge Durette	Matane	61–42–02	Modified Lattice	1925	1979 (Demolished)
Bridge Imbeault	Saint-Leon-le-Grand (Maskinongé)	61–43–08	Modified Lattice	1906	1987 (Demolished)
Bridge Ouelle East	La Pocatière	61–32–01	Modified Lattice	1909	1985 (Demolished)
Plant Bridge	Causapscal (Saint-Jacques-le-Majeur)	61–43–03	Modified Lattice	1910	1987 (Demolished)
Red Bridge	Trinité-des-Monts	61–58–08	Modified Lattice	1933	1994 (Embâcle Spring)
Pont Ste-Jeanne d'Arc	Sainte-Jeanne-d'Arc-de-la-Mitis	61–43–01	Modified Lattice	1937	1981 (Burned, 1 year after its complete renovation)
Capitale-Nationale
Bridge Redman	Saint-Gabriel-de-Valcartier	61–55–02	Modified Lattice	1931	1972 (Arson)
Red Bridge	Saint-Ferréol-les-Neiges	61–48–02	Modified Lattice	~ 1900	1961 (Demolished)
Bridge 61–54–04	Saint-Ferréol-les-Neiges	61–54–04	Modified Lattice	N / A	1960 (Replaced by a modern bridge)
Centre-du-Québec
Bridge Leblanc	Précieux-Sang (Bécancour)	61–51–07	Modified Lattice	1936	1975 (Replaced by a modern bridge)
Pont Picard	Saint-Rémi-de-Tingwick	61–04–08	Joists	~ 1900	1982 (destroyed in a violent storm)
Bridge Fish	Saint-Rémi-de-Tingwick	61–04–09	Perforated	~ 1900	1998 (destroyed by flood waters)
Bridge Lanaisse	Warwick	61–04–04	Modified Lattice	1932	1969
Chaudière-Appalaches
Bridge Bolduc	Val-Alain	61–40–06	Modified Lattice	1942	1971 (Demolished)
Stubborn Mill Bridge	Saint-Étienne-de-Lauzon	61–38–01	Modified Lattice	1930	1975 (Replaced by a modern bridge)
Pont Morin	Val-Alain	61–40–05	Modified Lattice	1942	1971 (Demolished)
Eastern Townships
Bridge Capelton	Hatley	61–67–02	Perforated Lattice	1862	2002 (Arson)
Bridge St Mark	Coaticook	61–69–02	Multiple Perforations	1887	1979 (Demolished)
Bridge St-Camille	Saint-Camille	61–75–03	Modified Lattice	1933	1996 (Arson)
Edward Bridge	Compton	61–18–13	Multiple Perforations	1888	1964 (destroyed by ice)
Bridge Fuller	Ascot Corner	61–67–01	Multiple Perforations	N / A	1970 (Burned)
Bridge Gibson	Melbourne	61–57–02	Lattice	1888	1988 (Burned)
Bridge North Branch	Potton	61–11–04	Lattice	N / A	1980 (collapsed through lack of maintenance)
Pont Ste-Catherine	Ayer's Cliff	61–69–04	Modified Lattice	1928	1985 (Arson)
Bridge Scotstown	Scotstown	61–18–07	Modified Lattice	N / A	1973 (Replaced by a concrete bridge)
Pont-Willis Leggett	Saint-Isidore-d'Auckland	61–18–09	Modified Lattice	1944	2001 (Burned)
Gaspésie–Îles-de-la-Madeleine
Bridge Village	Port-Daniel	61–10–09	Modified Lattice	1920	1944 (Demolished)
Red Bridge	Port-Daniel	61–10–03	Modified Lattice	1938	1994 (Arson)
Pont Ste-Marthe	La Martre	61–23–06	Modified Lattice	1922	1953 (Demolished)
Laurentides
Bridge Village	Chute-Saint-Philippe	61–33–04	Modified Lattice	1937	1974 (Burned)
Bridge Gareau	Lac-Douaire	61–46–01	Modified Lattice	1944	2007 (Demolished by the company Nexfor)
Best Bridge	Brébeuf	61–33–06	Modified Lattice	1899	1989 (Replaced by a modern bridge)
Mauricie
Bridge Village	Saint-Adelphe	61–13–01	Modified Lattice	1924	1965 (Replaced by a modern bridge)
Bridge Creek Flat	Sainte-Ursule	61–41–01	Modified Lattice	1924	1985 (Partially burned and demolished)
Bridge of Lac-Croche	Sainte-Thècle		Modified Lattice		July 1955 (demolished and replaced by a new cement bridge)
Outaouais
Bridge Bowman	Val-des-Bois	61–52–06	Modified Lattice	1929	1995 (Burned)
Pont Gendron	Wakefield	61–25–07	Modified Lattice	1915	1984 (Arson)
Bridge Kelly	Low 45°49′23″N 76°1′12″W	61–25–13	Modified Lattice	1923	January 19, 2019 (Arson)
Saguenay–Lac-Saint-Jean
Carbonneau Bridge	Saint-Félicien	61–60–23	Modified Lattice	1909	1942 (carried away by ice)
Bridge Pass	Ferland-et-Boilleau	61–17–05	Modified Lattice	1934	1965 (Replaced by a modern bridge)
Bridge of Poplars	Saguenay (La Baie)	61–17–06	Modified Lattice	1934	1996 (Carried away at the Saguenay flood )
Bridge Ticouapé	Saint-Félicien	61–60–05	Modified Lattice	1905	1965 (Replaced by a modern bridge)
Pont Notre-Dame-de-Lorette	Notre-Dame-de-Lorette	61–60–08	Modified Lattice	1943	1980 (Replaced by a concrete bridge)
Bridge Price	Dolbeau-Mistassini	61–60–42	Modified Lattice	N / A	1948 (Replaced by a concrete bridge)
