= Normandin =

Normandin may refer to:

== People ==
- Adam Normandin, U.S. contemporary realist painter
- Alphonse Normandin, an early settler of Abitibi-Temiscaminque; namesake of the Pont Alphonse-Normandin
- Christine Normandin (born 1984), Canadian politician
- Daniel Normandin, a gold medalist at the 2005 Canadian Paralympic Athletics Championships
- Jacques-Antoine Normandin (born 1951), Canadian politician
- Joseph-Laurent Normandin (19th century), Canadian surveyor, namesake of Normandin, Quebec
- Luis Normandín (born 1932), Argentine water polo player who competed in the 1952 Summer Olympics
- Zak Normandin (born 1984), American entrepreneur and the current CEO and co-founder of the NYC-based beverage company, Dirty Lemon Beverages

== Places ==
- Normandin, Quebec, Canada; a city in Maria-Chapdelaine, Saguenay-Lac-Saint-Jean
- Normandin River, a tributary of the north shore of Ashuapmushuan Lake, Lac-Ashuapmushuan, Le Domaine-du-Roy, Saguenay-Lac-Saint-Jean, Quebec, Canada
- Normandin Lake (Normandin River), Lac-Ashuapmushuan, Le Domaine-du-Roy, Saguenay-Lac-Saint-Jean, Quebec, Canada; a lake

== Facilities and structures ==
- Pont Alphonse-Normandin (English: Alphonse Normandin Bridge), a covered bridge over the Davy River, in Abitibi-Temiscamingue, Quebec, Canada
- Normandin Middle School, New Bedford, Massachusetts, USA

== Other uses ==
- Joly-Normandin, a motion picture film format

== See also ==
- Normandy (disambiguation)
- Normandie (disambiguation)
- Norman (disambiguation)
