= Clermont, Quebec =

Clermont, Quebec may refer to:

- Clermont, Capitale-Nationale, Quebec, in Charlevoix-Est Regional County Municipality
- Clermont, Abitibi-Témiscamingue, Quebec, in Abitibi-Ouest Regional County Municipality
