= Pont Levasseur =

Covered bridge in Quebec, Canada

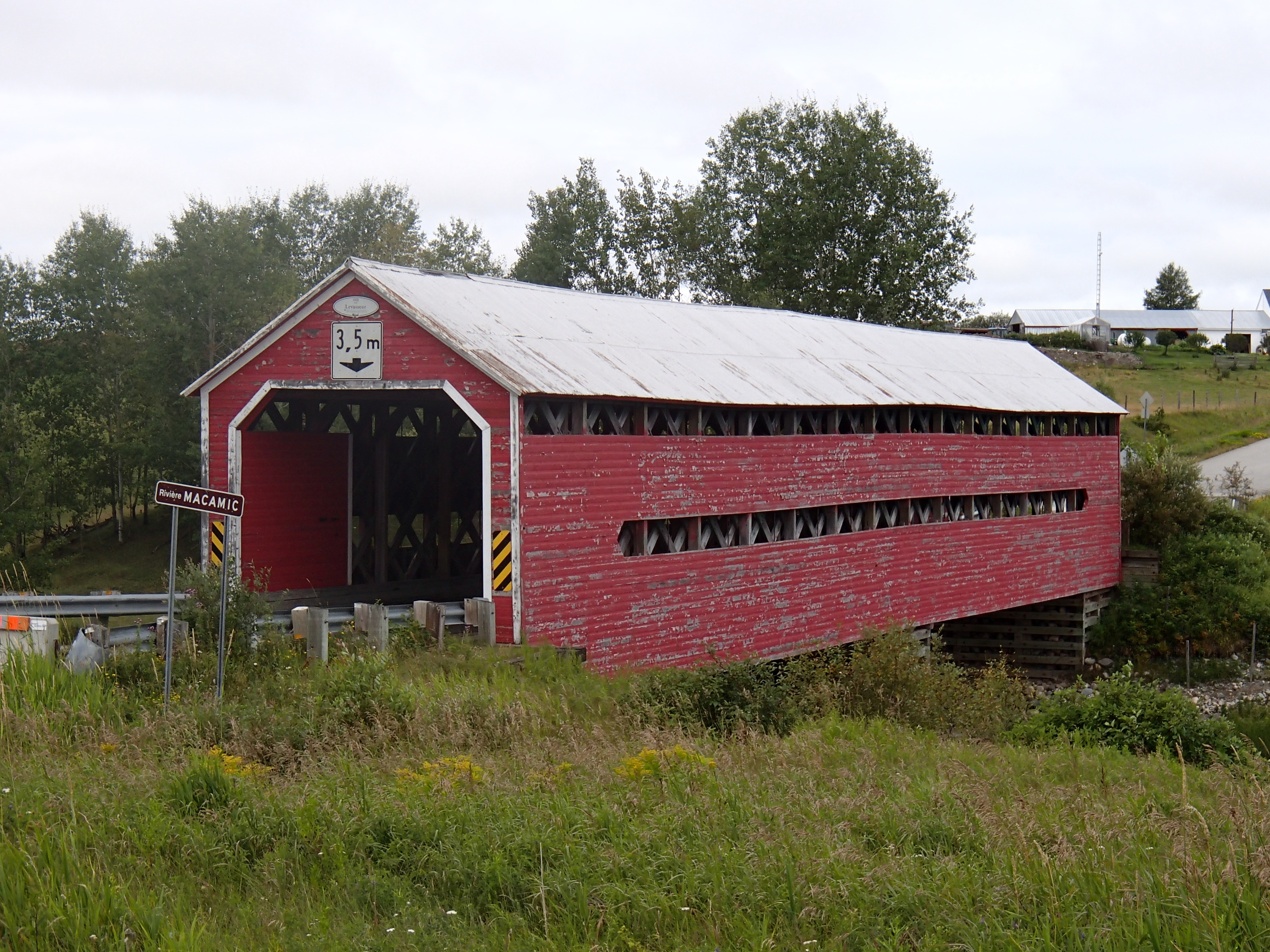
- Coordinates: 48.835278°N 78.889444°W
- Carries: Road Bridge
- Crosses: Rivière Macamic
- Locale: Authier-Nord

Characteristics
- Design: Town lattice
- Material: Wood
- Total length: 39m
- Clearance above: 3.50m

History
- Opened: 1928

The pont Levasseur is a covered bridge in Abitibi-Témiscamingue, Quebec, Canada.

Among the last in North America, 34 covered bridges were constructed in Abitibi, and are associated with the colonisation of the region in the early 1900s. Today fewer than half of them are extant.

The single-lane bridge is of Lattice truss bridge design. This design was modified by the Quebec Ministry of Colonisation and was used for more than 500 covered bridges in Quebec.

The central pillar was added in 1946. In 1962 it was raised 60cm. In 1985 it was renovated. Following renovations in 2015, the load capacity was reduced to 8 tonnes from 12. It was repainted in 2016.

It is listed in the répertoire du patrimoine culturel du Québec.

== See also ==
List of covered bridges in Quebec
