= Pont Leclerc =

Covered bridge in Quebec, Canada

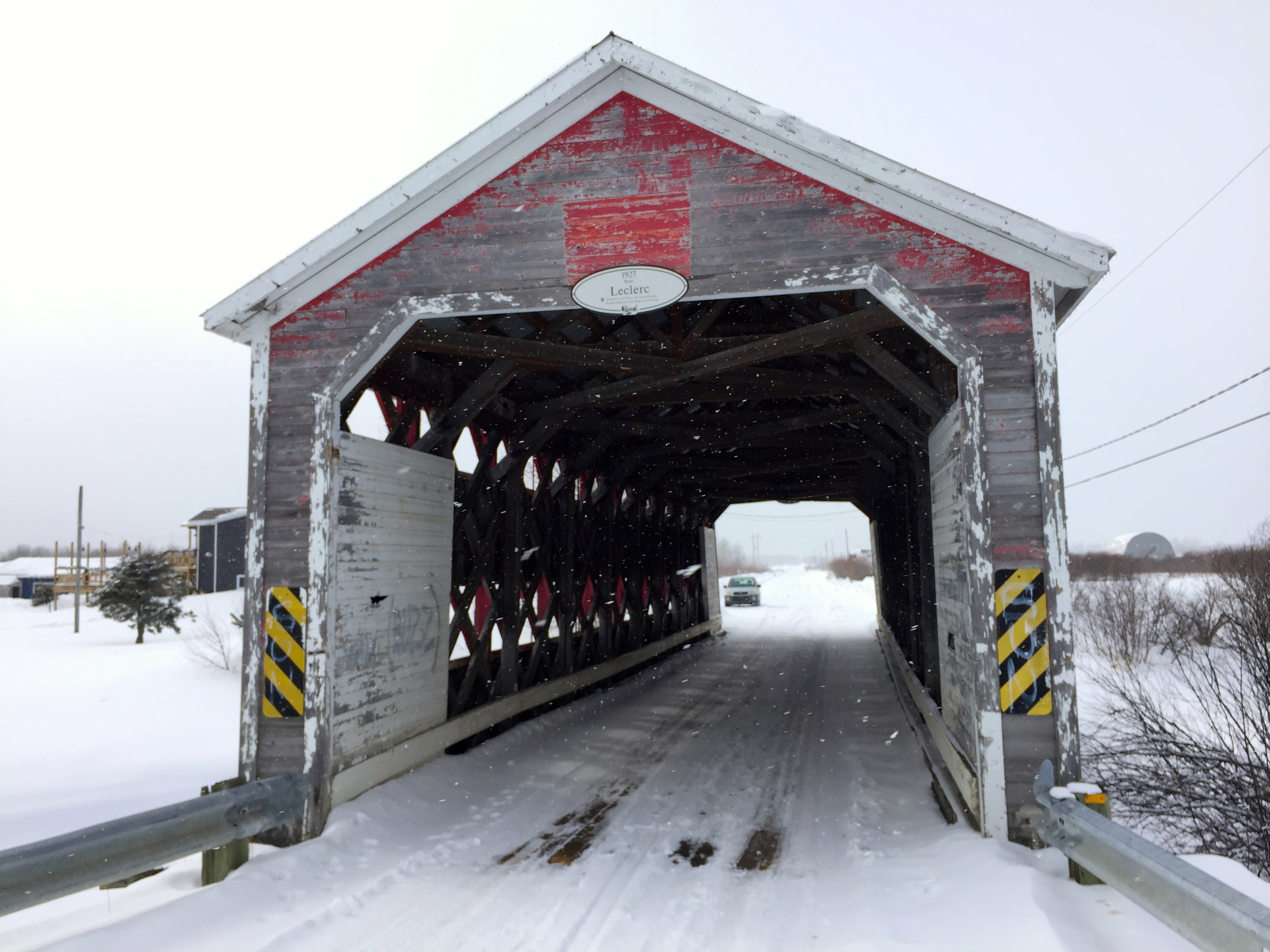
- Coordinates: 48.836389°N 79.275833°W
- Carries: Road Bridge
- Crosses: Ruisseau Bouchard
- Locale: La Sarre

Characteristics
- Design: Town lattice
- Material: Wood
- Total length: 26m
- Clearance above: 3.65m

History
- Opened: 1927

The pont Leclerc is a covered bridge in Abitibi-Témiscamingue, Quebec, Canada.

Among the last in Quebec, 34 covered bridges were constructed in Abitibi, and are associated with the colonisation of the region in the early 1900s. Today fewer than half of them are extant.

The single-lane bridge is of Lattice truss bridge design. This design was modified by the Quebec Ministry of Colonisation and was used for more than 500 covered bridges in Quebec.

It was renovated in 1947, 1949, and again in 1984.

It is listed in the répertoire du patrimoine culturel du Québec.

== See also ==
List of covered bridges in Quebec
