= Pont Champagne =

Covered bridge in Quebec, Canada

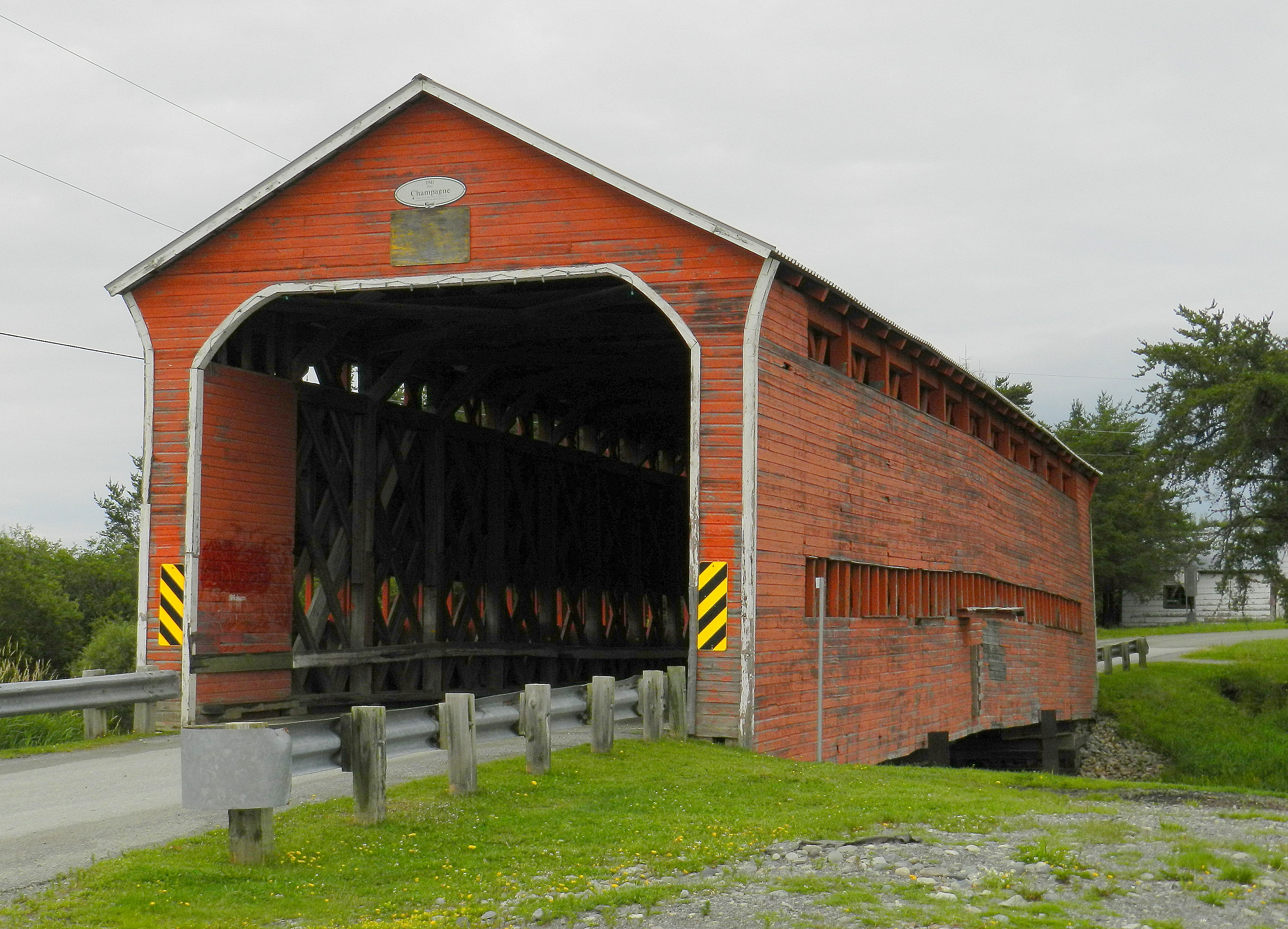
- Coordinates: 48.21472°N 77.8425°W
- Carries: Road Bridge
- Crosses: Rivière Vassan
- Locale: Val-d'Or, Abitibi-Témiscamingue, Quebec, Canada

Characteristics
- Design: Town lattice
- Material: Wood
- Total length: 32m
- Width: 7m
- Clearance above: 4.45m

History
- Opened: 1941

The pont Champagne is a covered bridge that crosses the Rivière Vassan near the municipality of Val-d'Or in Abitibi-Témiscamingue, Quebec, Canada.

It is named after an early pioneer, Hervé Champagne. It was painted red in the 1980s, having been grey since the '60s. In 1989 and metal support pillar was added.

The single-lane bridge is of Lattice truss bridge design. This design was modified by the former Quebec Ministry of Colonisation and was used for more than 500 covered bridges in Quebec. Thirty-four covered bridges were built in Abitibi, during the colonisation of the region. Today fewer than half of them are extant.

The weight capacity is 12 tonnes. It is cited in the Quebec Cultural Heritage Directory since 2001 but does not benefit from any municipal protection.

== Gallery ==
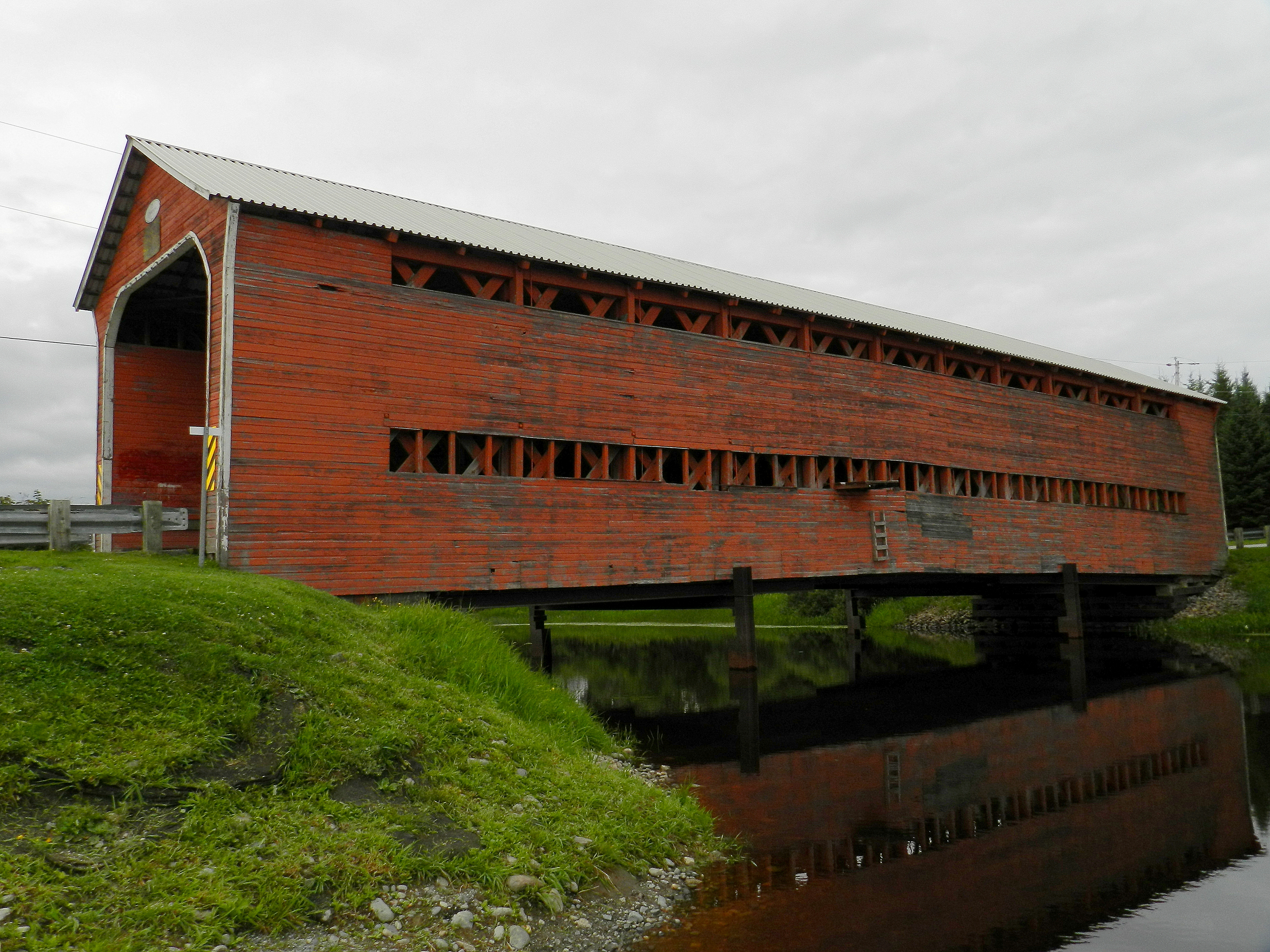
Above the Vassan

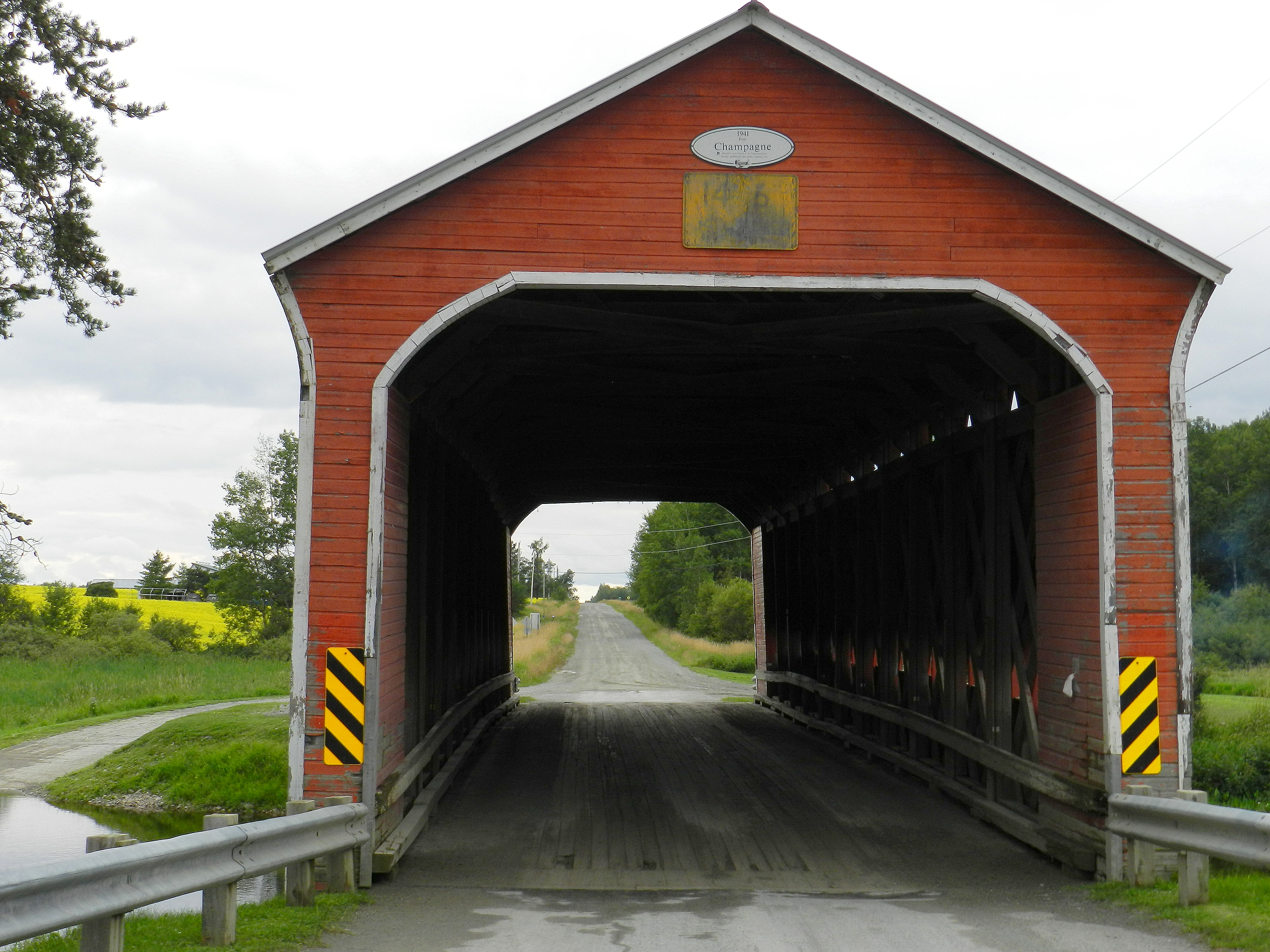
Eastern entry

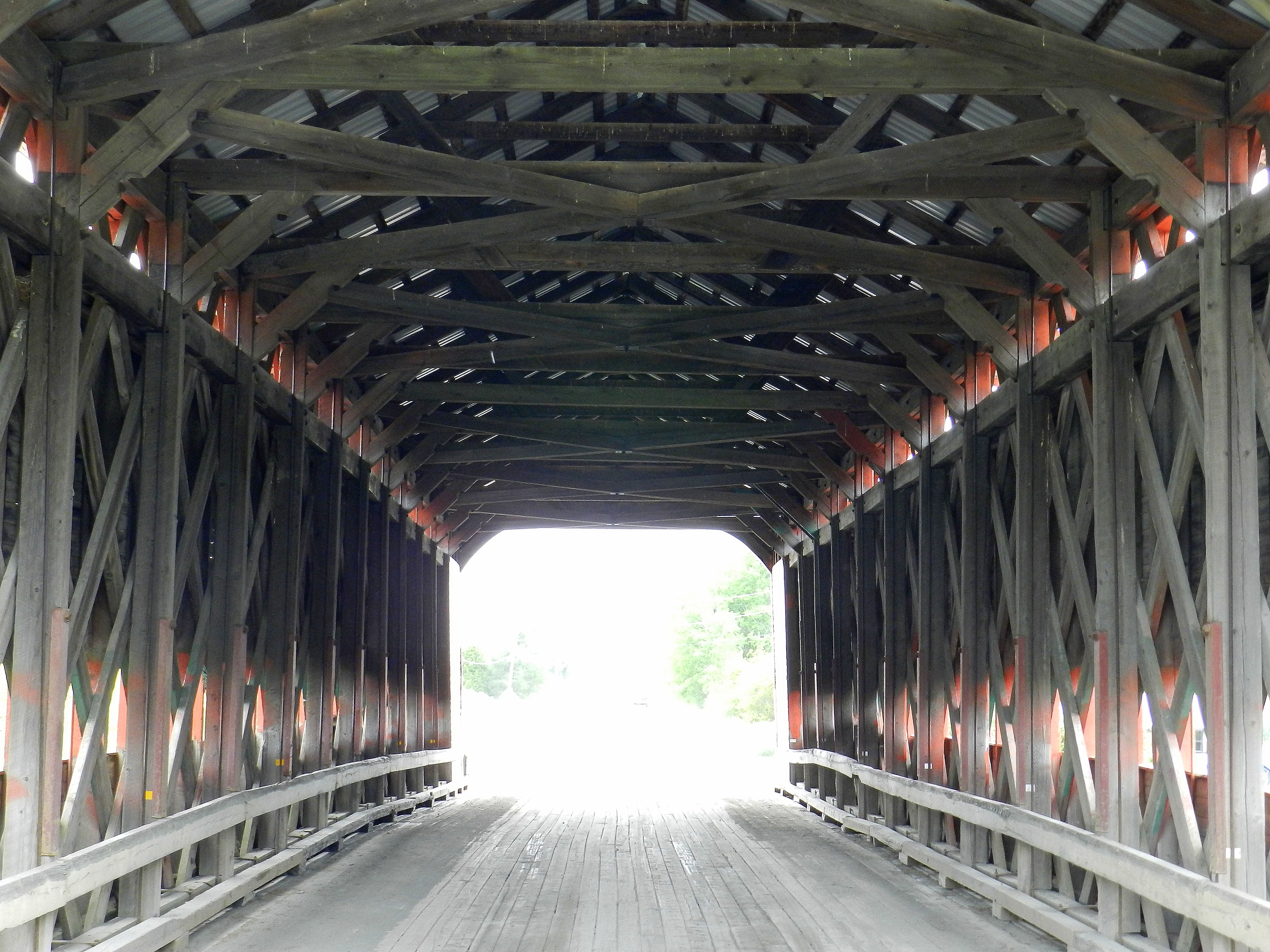
Town truss

== See also ==
- List of covered bridges in Quebec
