= Pont Landry =

Covered bridge in Quebec, Canada

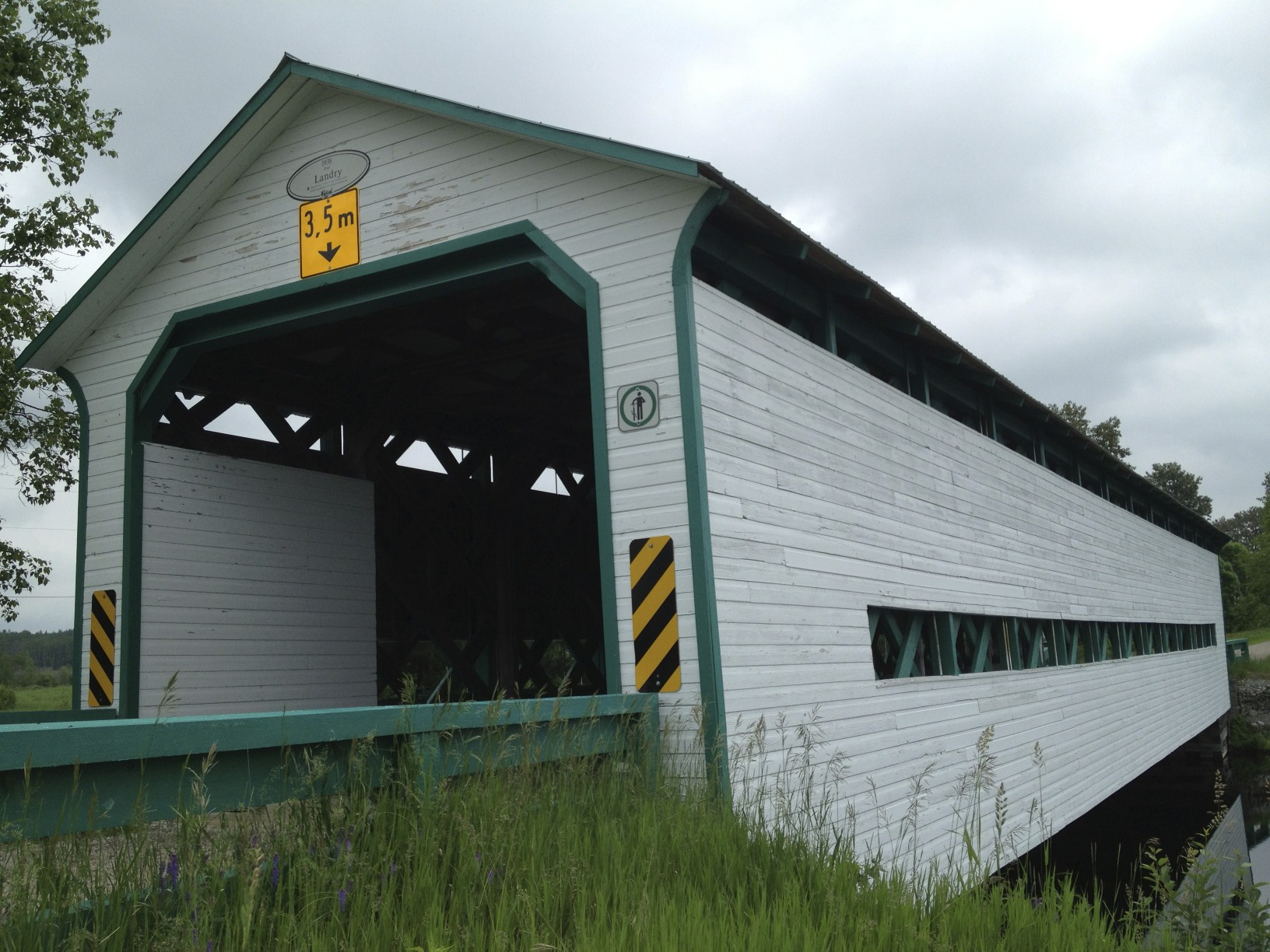
- Coordinates: 47.427222°N 79.032222°W
- Carries: Road Bridge
- Crosses: Rivière Fraser
- Locale: Latulipe-et-Gaboury

Characteristics
- Design: Town lattice
- Material: Wood
- Total length: 32m
- Width: 6m
- Clearance above: 3.5m

History
- Opened: 1938

The pont Landry is a covered bridge in Abitibi-Témiscamingue, Quebec, Canada.

Among the last in Quebec, 34 covered bridges were constructed in Abitibi, and are associated with the colonisation of the region in the early 1900s. Today fewer than half of them are extant.

The single-lane bridge is of Lattice truss bridge design. This design was modified by the Quebec Ministry of Colonisation and was used for more than 500 covered bridges in Quebec.

It was repaired in 1991 and repainted in 2010.

In 2007 it was declared an historic monument by the local municipality, and it is listed in the répertoire du patrimoine culturel du Québec.

== See also ==
List of covered bridges in Quebec
