= Pont de l'Arche de Noé =

Covered bridge in Quebec, Canada

Pont de l’Arche-de-Noé
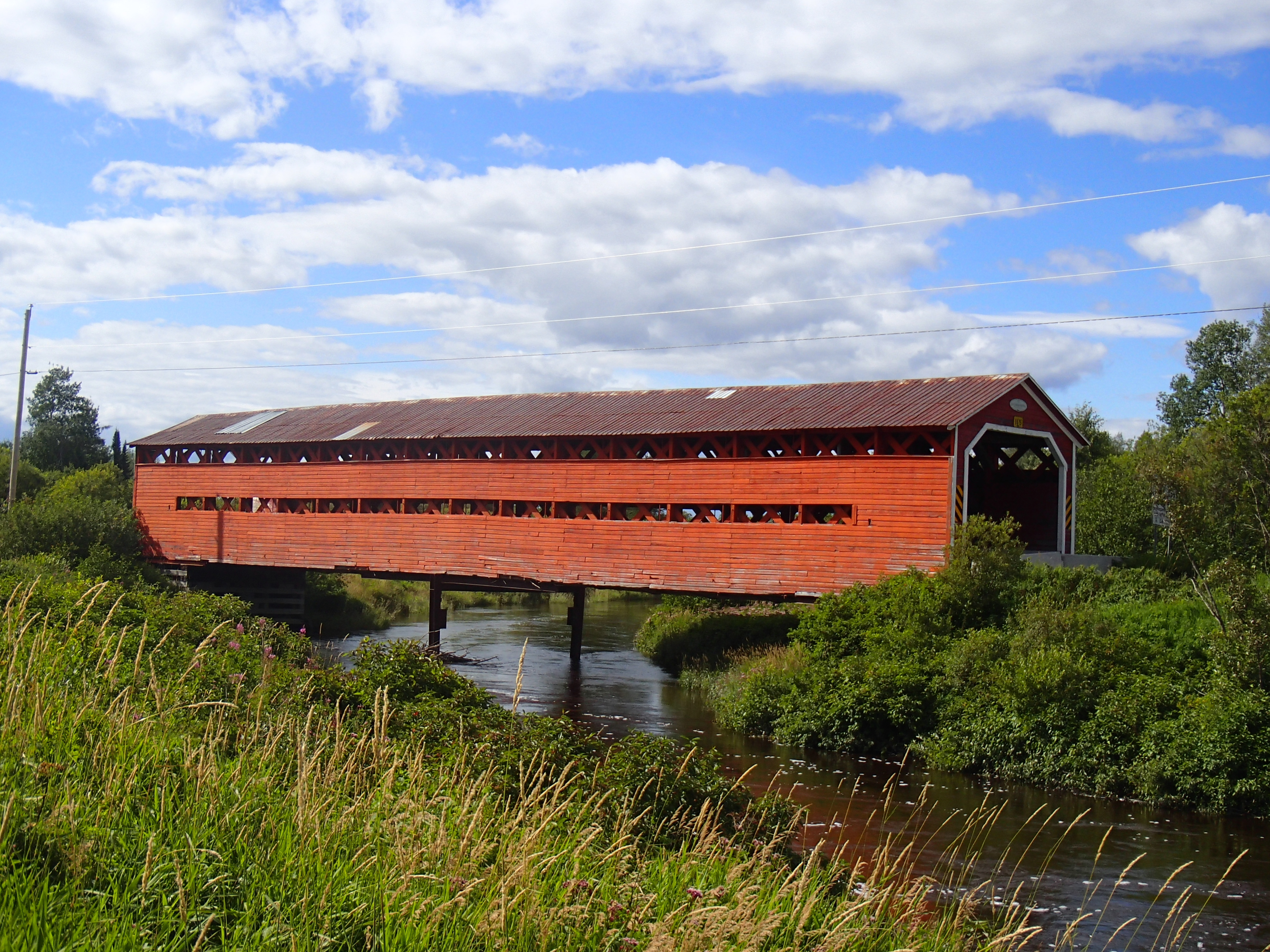
- View from the west
- Coordinates: 48.6463298°N 77.5771907°W
- Carries: Road Bridge
- Crosses: Ruisseau Tourville
- Locale: La Morandière-Rochebaucourt, Abitibi-Témiscamingue, Quebec, Canada

Characteristics
- Design: Town lattice
- Material: Wood
- Total length: 37m
- Clearance above: 3,50

History
- Opened: 1937
- Closed: 2010

The pont de l’Arche-de-Noé is a covered bridge that crosses the Ruisseau Tourville in the municipality of La Morandière-Rochebaucourt in Abitibi-Témiscamingue, Quebec, Canada.

Among the last built in Quebec, 34 covered bridges were built in Abitibi, during the colonisation of the region. Today fewer than half of them are extant.

Built in 1937, it was painted red in the 1980s, having previously been grey. A metal pillar was added in 1985. Its name, which in French means "Noah's Ark", derives from the fact that it was washed away by flooding many times and had to be retrieved and put back in place.

The single-lane bridge is of Lattice truss bridge design. This design was modified by the Quebec Ministry of Colonisation and was used for more than 500 covered bridges in Quebec.

The weight capacity was 15 tonnes when in service. It was closed to traffic in 2010. It is listed in the Quebec Cultural Heritage Directory but does not benefit from any provincial or municipal protection.

== See also ==
List of covered bridges in Quebec
