= Pont du Petit-Quatre =

Covered bridge in Quebec, Canada

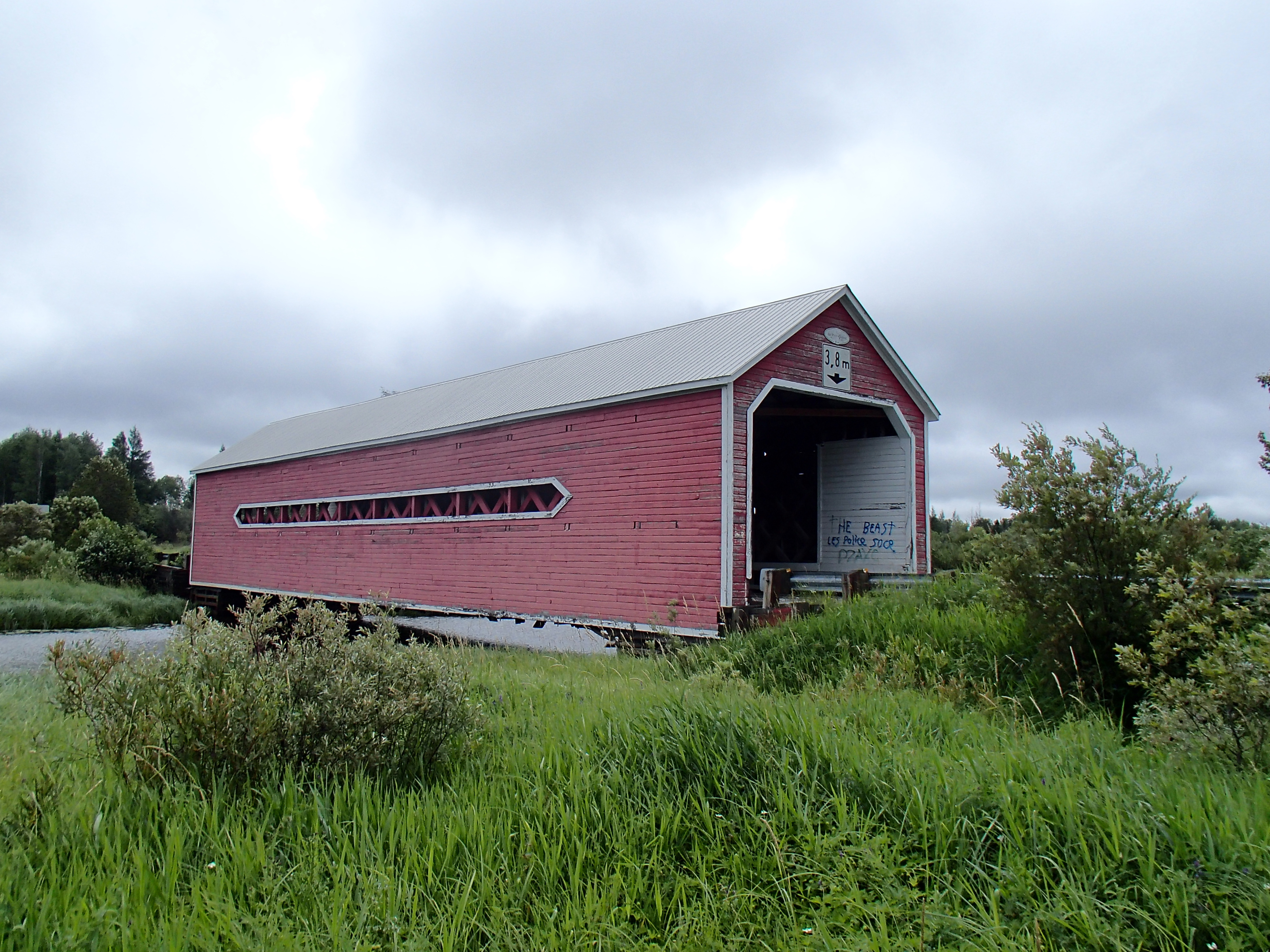
- Coordinates: 48.908056°N 79.326389°W
- Carries: Road Bridge
- Crosses: rivière Des Méloizes
- Locale: Clermont

Characteristics
- Design: Town lattice
- Material: Wood
- Total length: 32m
- Clearance above: 3,8m

History
- Opened: 1950

The pont du Petit-Quatre is a covered bridge in Abitibi-Témiscamingue, Quebec, Canada.

Among the last in Quebec, 34 covered bridges were constructed in Abitibi, and are associated with the colonisation of the region in the early 1900s. Today fewer than half of them are extant.

The single-lane bridge is of Lattice truss bridge design. This design was modified by the Quebec Ministry of Colonisation and was used for more than 500 covered bridges in Quebec. Unlike most bridges of the design, the pont du Petit-Quatre has higher windows and 3 inch trusses rather than the usual 2in.

Built in 1950, it was renovated in 2012, when the capacity was changed to 5 from 12 tonnes.

The bridge does not benefit from any provincial or municipal protection.

== See also ==
List of covered bridges in Quebec
