= Pont de l'Orignal =

Covered bridge in Quebec, Canada

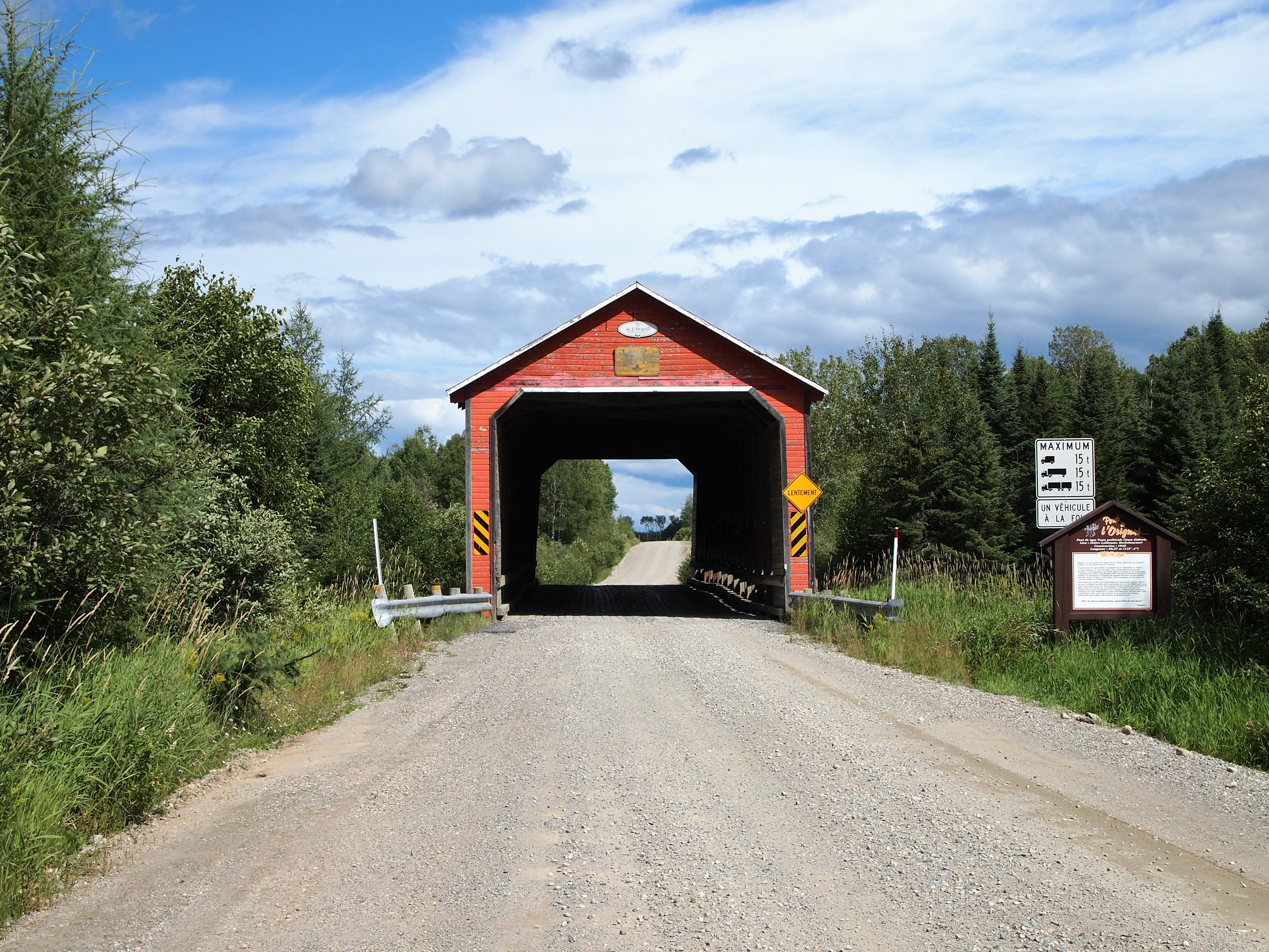
- Coordinates: 48.834722°N 79.246667°W
- Carries: Road Bridge
- Crosses: Rivière Laflamme
- Locale: La Morandière-Rochebaucourt

Characteristics
- Design: Town lattice
- Material: Wood
- Total length: 33m
- Clearance above: 4.45m

History
- Opened: 1942

The pont de l’Île is a covered bridge in Abitibi-Témiscamingue, Canada.

Among the last in Quebec, 34 covered bridges were constructed in Abitibi, and are associated with the colonisation of the region in the early 1900s. Today fewer than half of them are extant.

The single-lane bridge is of Lattice truss bridge design. This design was modified by the Quebec Ministry of Colonisation and was used for more than 500 covered bridges in Quebec.

Built in 1942, it was painted red in 1983, having been grey for many years. It was damaged by flooding in 2002. Its name, which translates as Moose Bridge, references to nearby frequent sightings of the eponymous animal. The weight capacity is five tonnes. It is the only covered bridge on a provincial highway, Quebec Route 395.

The bridge does not benefit from any provincial or municipal protection.

== See also ==
List of covered bridges in Quebec
