= Pont Émery-Sicard =

Covered bridge in Quebec, Canada

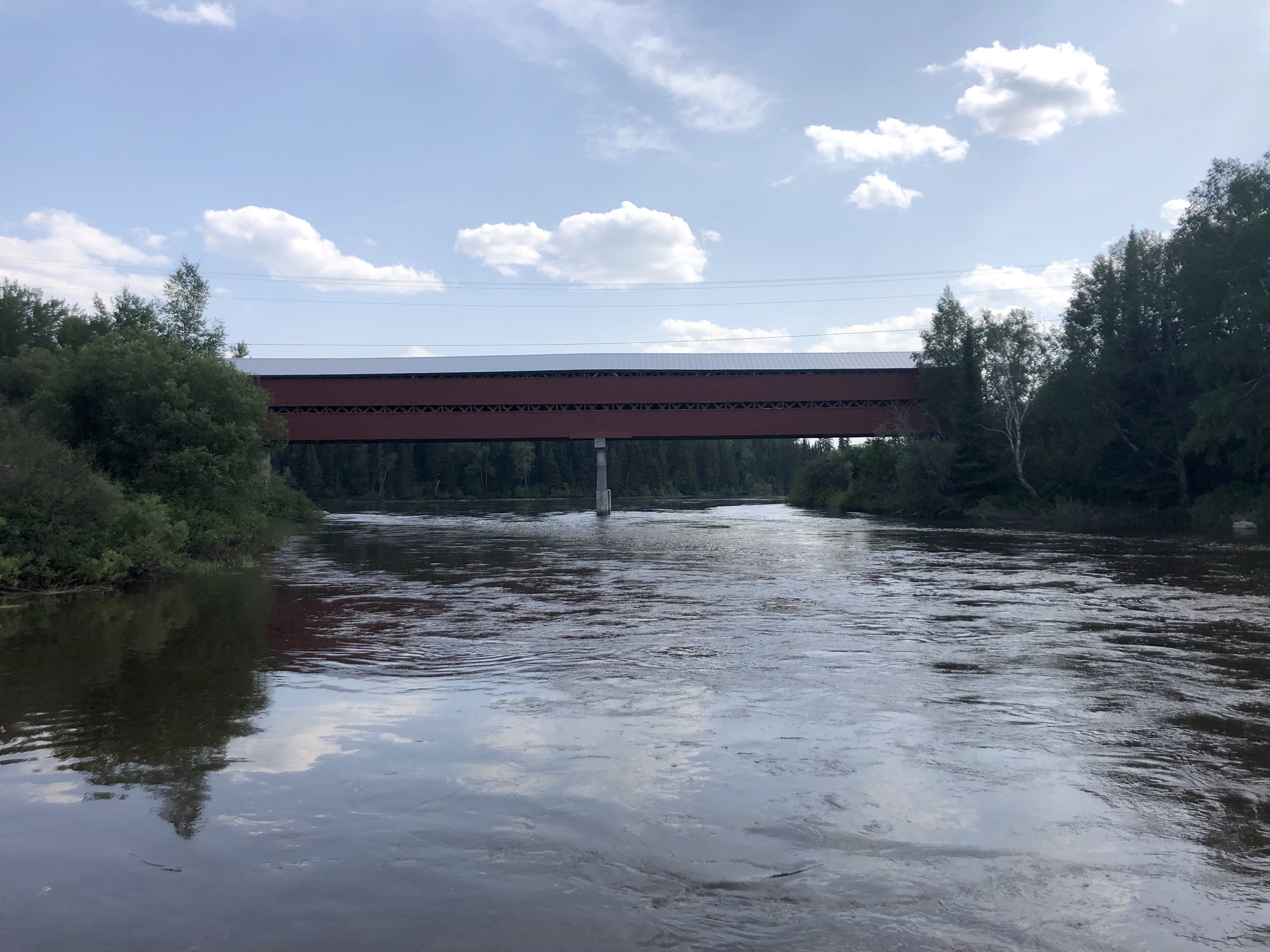
- Coordinates: 48.643333°N 78.005°W
- Carries: Road Bridge
- Crosses: Harricana River
- Locale: Amos

Characteristics
- Design: Town lattice
- Material: Wood
- Total length: 66m
- Clearance above: 3,10m

History
- Opened: 1946

The pont Émery-Sicard is a covered bridge in Abitibi-Témiscamingue, Quebec, Canada.

Among the last in Quebec, 34 covered bridges were constructed in Abitibi, and are associated with the colonisation of the region in the early 1900s. Today fewer than half of them are extant.

The single-lane bridge is of Lattice truss bridge design. This design was modified by the Quebec Ministry of Colonisation and was used for more than 500 covered bridges in Quebec. Unlike most bridges of the design, the pont du Petit-Quatre has higher windows and 3 inch trusses rather than the usual 2in.

Built in 1946 to replace an earlier 1934 bridge which had burnt down. It was renovated in 1964 and again in 2010.

It is listed in the répertoire du patrimoine culturel du Québec.

== See also ==
- List of covered bridges in Quebec
