= Pont Grandchamp =

Covered bridge in Quebec, Canada

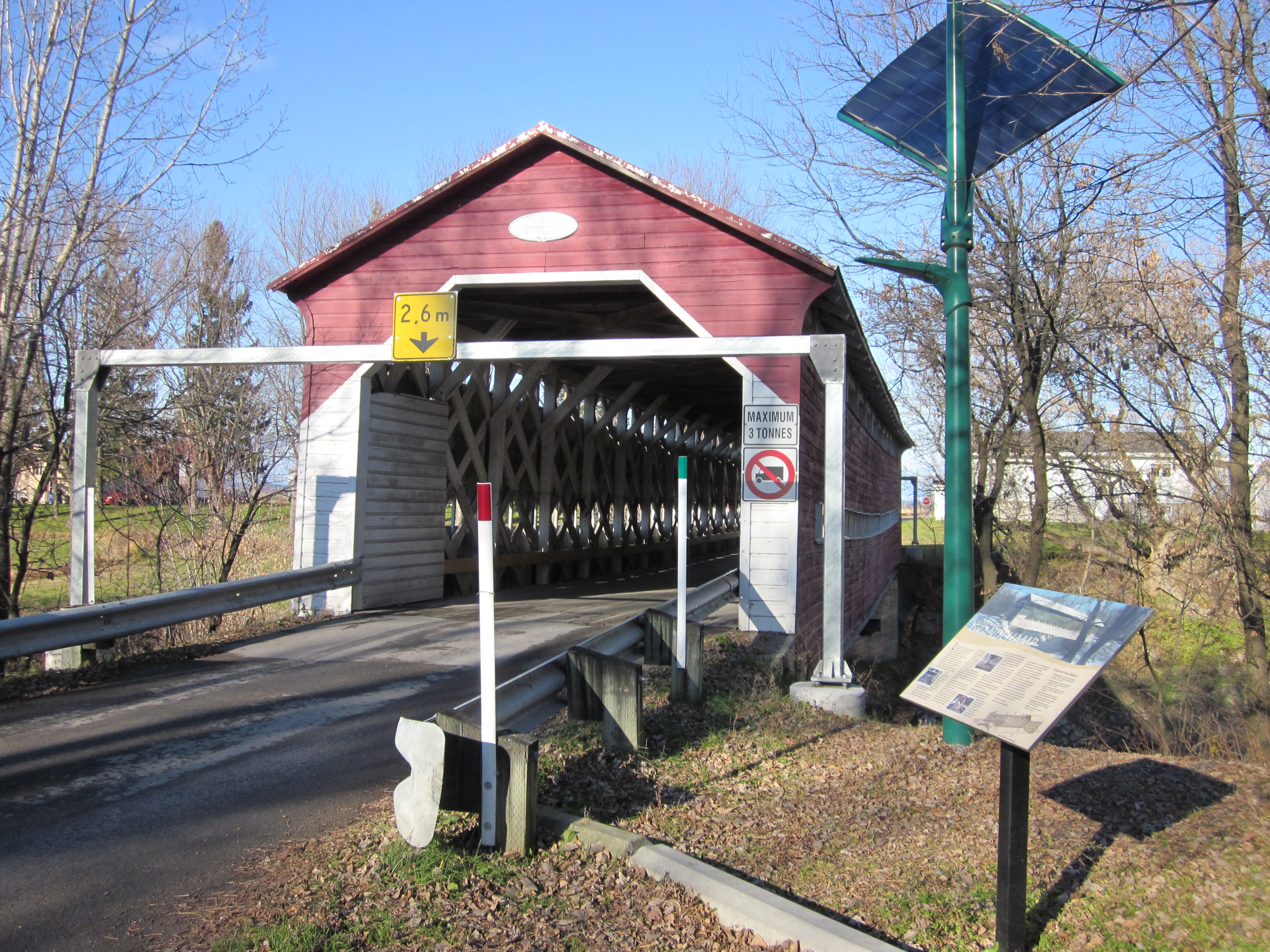
- Pont Grandcamp seen from the west
- Coordinates: 46°05′35″N 73°12′41″W
- Carries: Road Bridge
- Crosses: Rivière Bayonne

Characteristics
- Design: Covered bridge
- Material: Wood
- Total length: 34.44 metres (113.0 ft)
- Width: 4.57 metres (15.0 ft)
- Height: 3.5 metres (11 ft)
- Clearance above: 2.6 metres (8 ft 6 in)

History
- Opened: 1918

Location
- Interactive map of Pont Grandchamp

The Pont Grandchamp is a covered bridge that crosses the Rivière Bayonne at Sainte-Geneviève-de-Berthier, Quebec, Canada.

The wooden trusses are of the type Town québécois, a variant on the lattice truss patented by Ithiel Town in 1820. About 500 similar bridges were built in Quebec in the first half of the 1900s.

Built in 1918, it is named after local farmer and industrialist, Arthur Cornellier dit Grandchamp, who in 1885 had supervised the construction of an earlier bridge at the site.

By 1977 The Pont Grandchamp was in need of repair and was closed to vehicular traffic. Later, local riverside residents organized themselves and restored the bridge, and it was reopened in 1996. Since then it has had renovations financed the local municipality and by Hydro Quebec.

It is the last remaining covered bridge still in operation in Lanaudière, and was declared a municipal historic site in 2018.

== See also ==
- List of covered bridges in Quebec
