= Pont Dénommée =

Covered bridge in Quebec, Canada

Pont Denommée
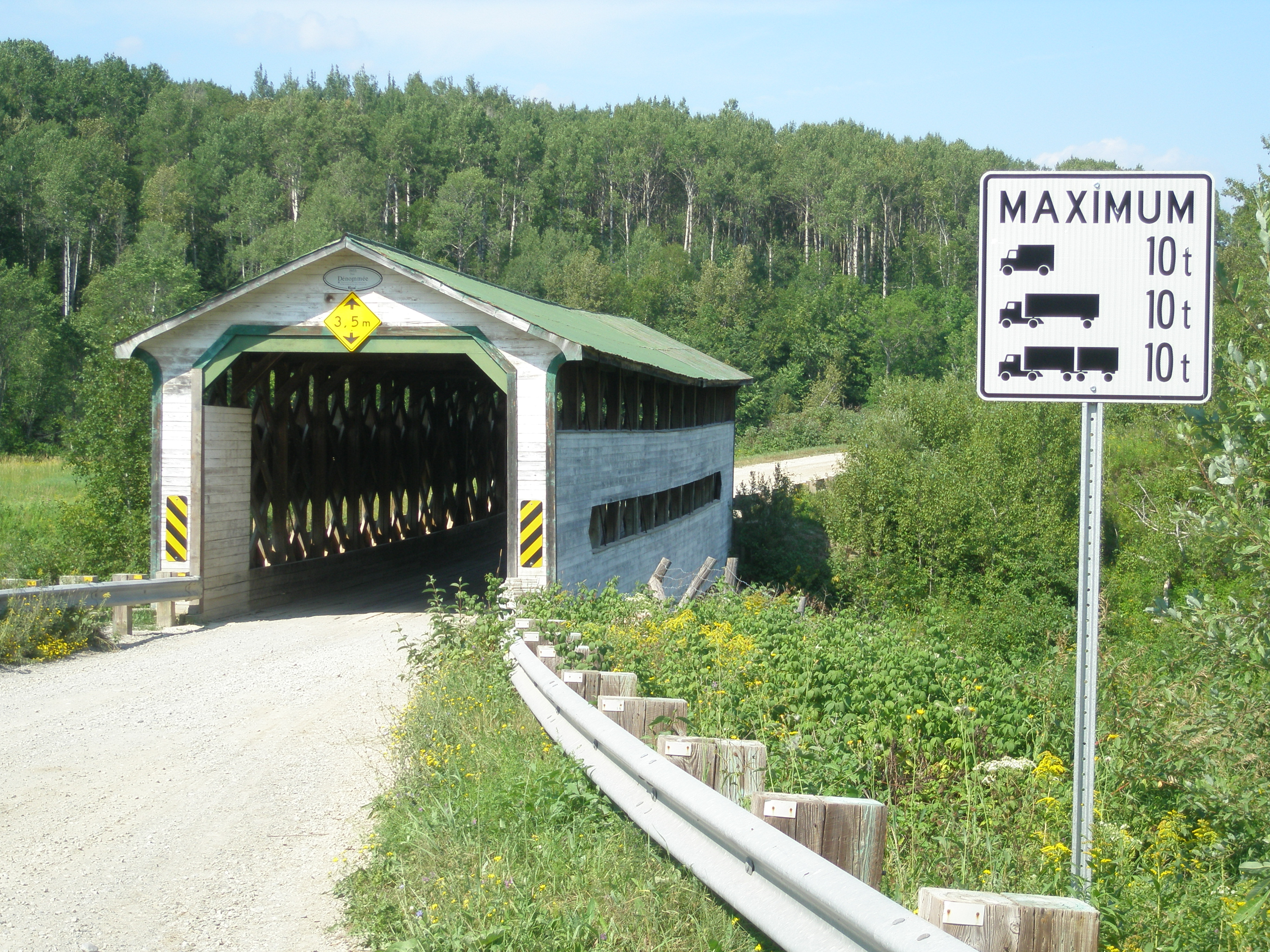
- Coordinates: 47.484722°N 79.407222°W
- Carries: Road Bridge
- Crosses: rivière à la Loutre
- Locale: Saint-Bruno-de-Guigues

Characteristics
- Design: Town lattice
- Material: Wood
- Total length: 30m
- Clearance above: 3.50m

History
- Opened: 1933

The pont Dénommée is a covered bridge in Abitibi-Témiscamingue, Canada.

Among the last in Quebec, 34 covered bridges were constructed in Abitibi, and are associated with the colonisation of the region in the early 1900s. Today fewer than half of them are extant.

The single-lane bridge is of Lattice truss bridge design. This design was modified by the Quebec Ministry of Colonisation and was used for more than 500 covered bridges in Quebec.

Built in 1933, it replaced an earlier bridge which was destroyed during flooding. It was lengthened by 10 metres in the 1950s, and renovated in 1986. The capacity is 10 tonnes. It is named after pioneer Albert Dénommée. It is closed to traffic in the winter since 1975.

The bridge does not benefit from any provincial or municipal protection.

== See also ==
- List of covered bridges in Quebec
