= Pont Molesworth =

Covered bridge in Quebec, Canada

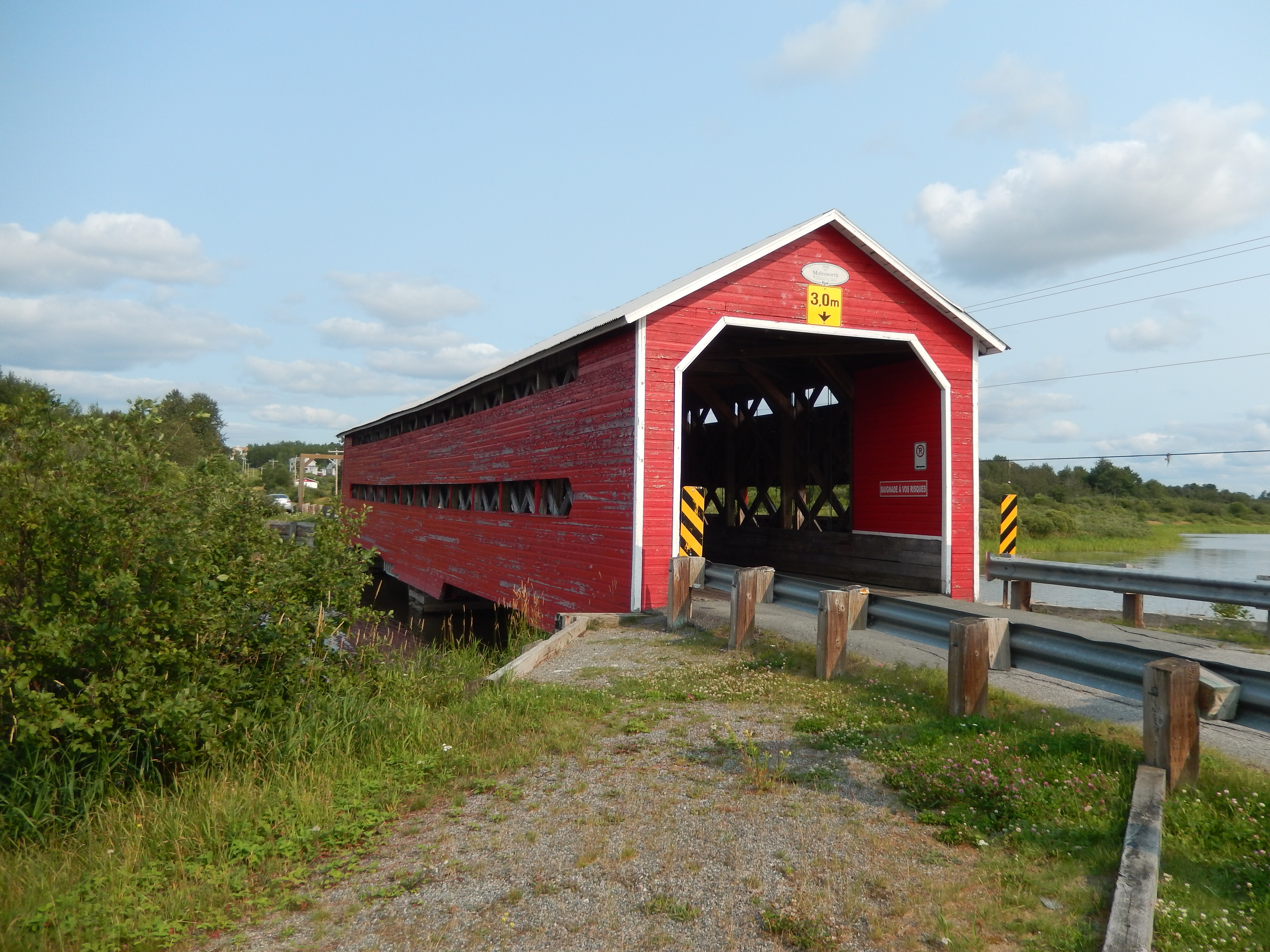
- Coordinates: 48.748889°N 78.994167°W
- Carries: Road Bridge
- Crosses: Rivière Loïs
- Locale: Macamic

Characteristics
- Design: Town lattice
- Material: Wood
- Total length: 34m
- Clearance above: 3.83m

History
- Opened: 1930

The pont Moleworth is a covered bridge in Abitibi-Témiscamingue, Quebec, Canada.

Among the last in North America, 34 covered bridges were constructed in Abitibi, and are associated with the colonisation of the region in the early 1900s. Today fewer than half of them are extant.

The single-lane bridge is of Lattice truss bridge design. This design was modified by the Quebec Ministry of Colonisation and was used for more than 500 covered bridges in Quebec.

The central pillar was added in 1950 to increase its capacity. Originally grey, it was repainted red during major renovations in 1987 and 2017.

It is listed in the répertoire du patrimoine culturel du Québec.

== See also ==
List of covered bridges in Quebec
