= Pont de la Calamité =

Covered bridge in Quebec, Canada

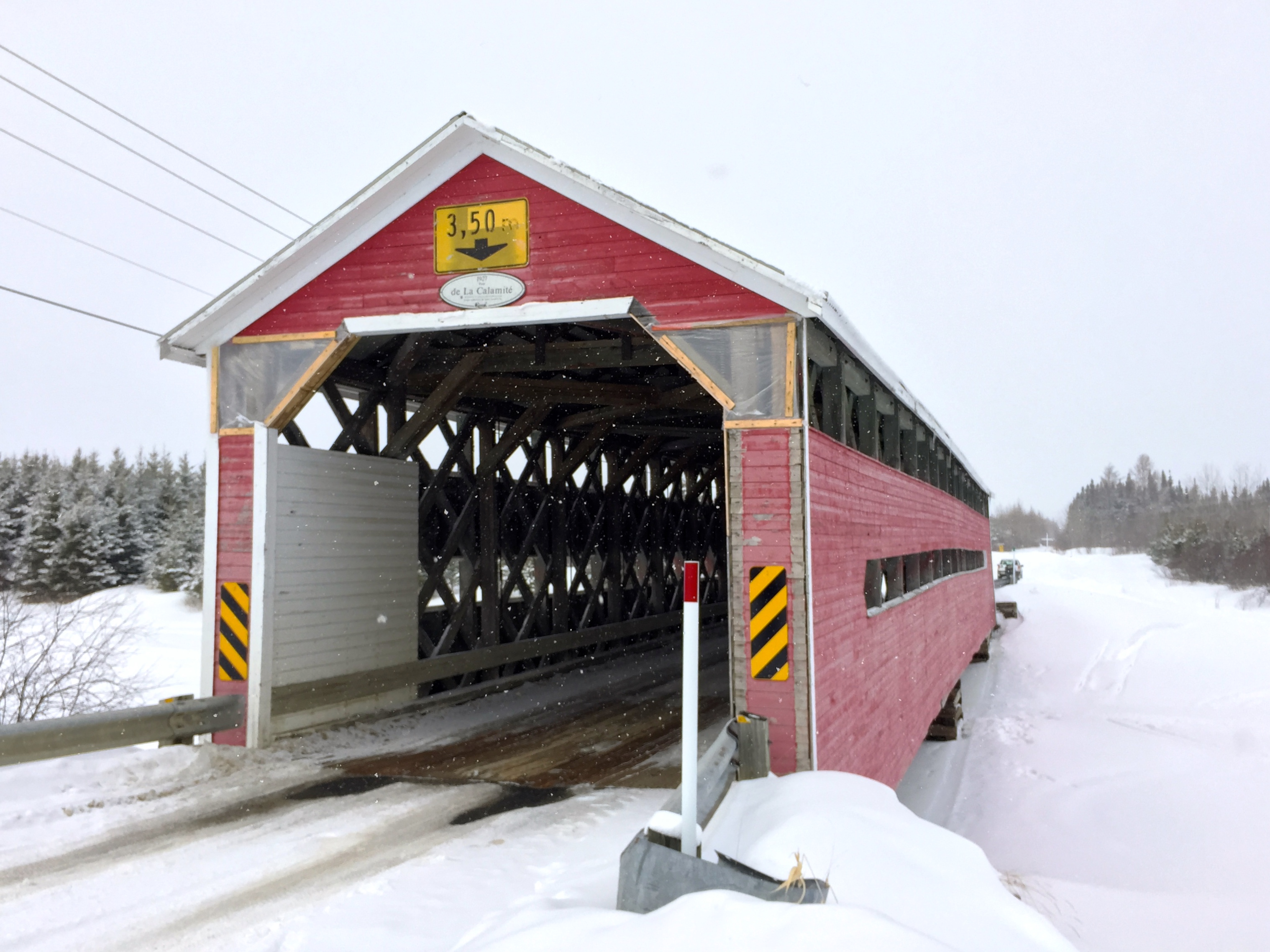
- Coordinates: 48.834722°N 79.246667°W
- Carries: Road Bridge
- Crosses: Rivière Des Méloizes
- Locale: La Sarre

Characteristics
- Design: Town lattice
- Material: Wood
- Total length: 37m
- Clearance above: 3.50m

History
- Opened: 1927

The pont de la Calamité was a covered bridge in Abitibi-Témiscamingue, Canada.

Among the last in Quebec, 34 covered bridges were constructed in Abitibi, and are associated with the colonisation of the region in the early 1900s. Today fewer than half of them are extant.

The single-lane bridge was of Lattice truss bridge design. This design was modified by the Quebec Ministry of Colonisation and was used for more than 500 covered bridges in Quebec.

Built in 1927, it was renovated in 1945 to increase the capacity of 12 tonnes. In 1984 it was painted red, having been grey for many years. Its name relates to the fact that the river it crosses, Rivière des Méloizes, was once sometimes known as Calamity River.

The bridge did not benefit from any provincial or municipal protection. It was completely destroyed by fire on May 31, 2021.

== See also ==
- List of covered bridges in Quebec
