= Pont Alphonse-Normandin =

Covered bridge in Quebec, Canada

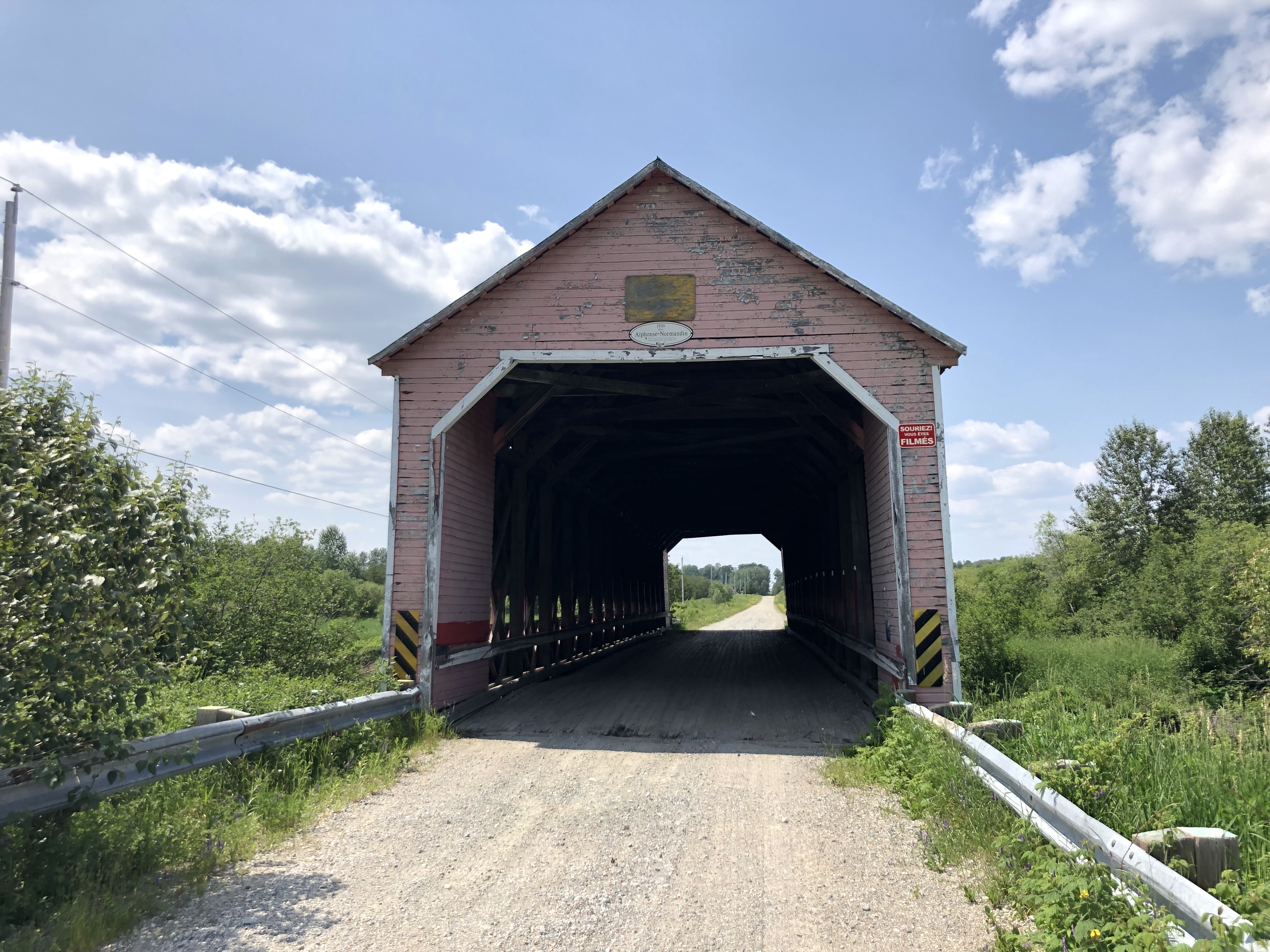
- Coordinates: 48.734444°N 78.163611°W
- Carries: Road Bridge
- Crosses: Rivière Davy
- Locale: Saint-Dominique-du-Rosaire, Abitibi-Témiscamingue, Quebec, Canada

Characteristics
- Design: Town lattice
- Material: Wood
- Total length: 39m
- Clearance above: 4.4

History
- Opened: 1950

The pont Alphonse-Normandin is a covered bridge that crosses the Rivière Davy in the municipality of Saint-Dominique-du-Rosaire in Abitibi-Témiscamingue, Quebec, Canada.

Thirty-four covered bridges were built in Abitibi, during the colonisation of the region. Today fewer than half of them are extant.

Built in 1950, it is one of the youngest bridges in the province. It was painted red in the 1980s, having previously been grey. It is named after an early pioneer who arrived in the region in 1923.

The single-lane bridge is of Lattice truss bridge design. This design was modified by the Quebec Ministry of Colonisation and was used for more than 500 covered bridges in Quebec.

The weight capacity is 8 tonnes. It is listed in the Quebec Cultural Heritage Directory but does not benefit from any provincial or municipal protection.

== See also ==
- List of covered bridges in Quebec
