= Sainte-Geneviève-de-Berthier =

- Municipality
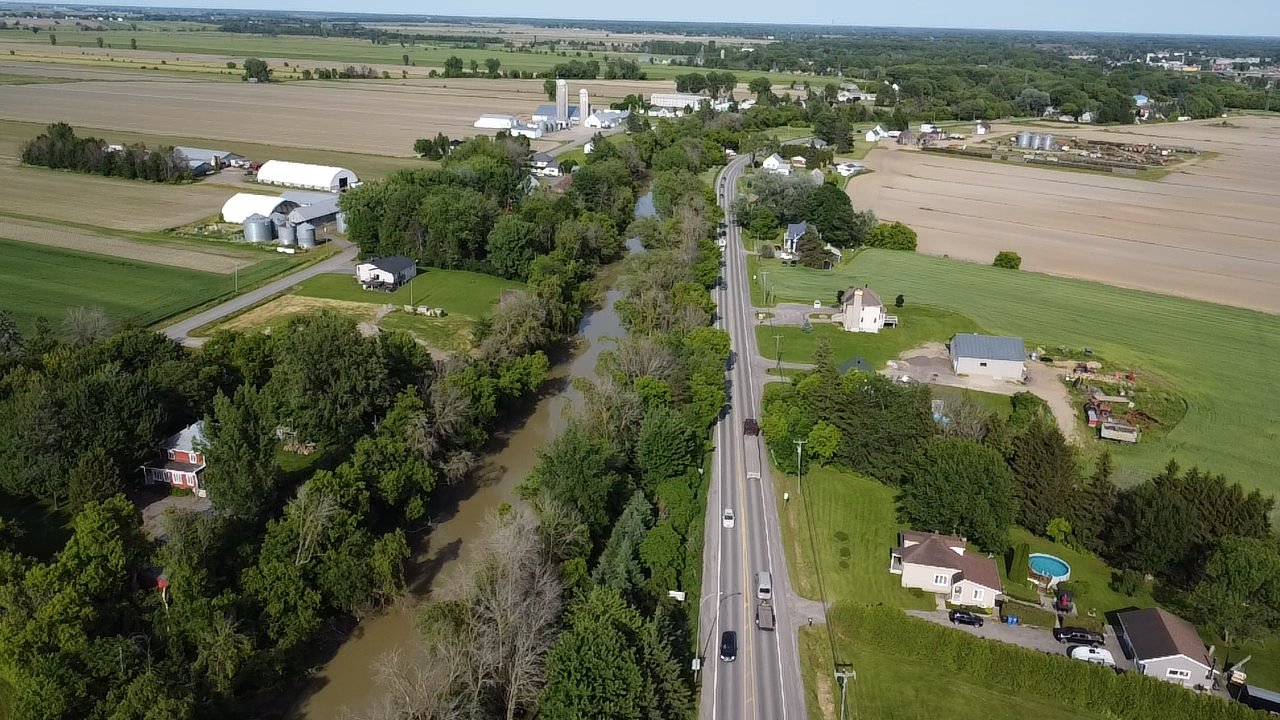

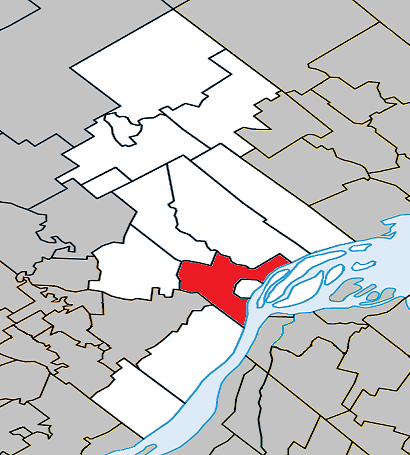
- Location within D'Autray RCM

- Location in central Quebec
- Coordinates: 46°05′N 73°13′W
- Country: Canada
- Province: Quebec
- Region: Lanaudière
- RCM: D'Autray
- Constituted: July 1, 1855

Government
  - Mayor: Robert Pufahl
  - Fed. riding: Berthier—Maskinongé
  - Prov. riding: Berthier

Area
  - Total: 73.13 km^{2} (28.24 sq mi)
  - Land: 67.03 km^{2} (25.88 sq mi)

Population (2021)
  - Total: 2,253
  - Density: 33.6/km^{2} (87/sq mi)
  - Change 2016-21: ▼1.2%
  - Dwellings: 977
- Time zone: UTC−5 (EST)
  - Summer (DST): UTC−4 (EDT)
- Postal code(s): J0K 1A0
- Area codes: 450, 579
- Highways A-40: R-138 R-158; R-345 R-347
- Website: municipalites-du-quebec.com/sainte-genevieve-de-berthier/index.php

Sainte-Geneviève-de-Berthier (French pronunciation: [sɛ̃t ʒənvjɛv də bɛʁtje]) is a municipality in the Lanaudière region of Quebec, Canada, part of the D'Autray Regional County Municipality. It is crossed by the river La Chaloupe. The Saint-Joseph River also passes over 2.1 km in the southwestern part of the municipal territory.

It is home to the Sainte-Geneviève church which forms an enclave within the city of Berthierville belonging to Sainte-Geneviève-de-Berthier. The church was classified as a heritage site in 2001 and is named in honor of Saint Genevieve. It is also home to the Grandchamp covered bridge which is recognized as a listed heritage asset and the Grande Côte Road which is known for its large ancestral houses.

== Neighborhoods ==
- Berthier County
- Paquin
- Rivière-Bayonne
- Ruisseau des Terres-Noires

== History ==
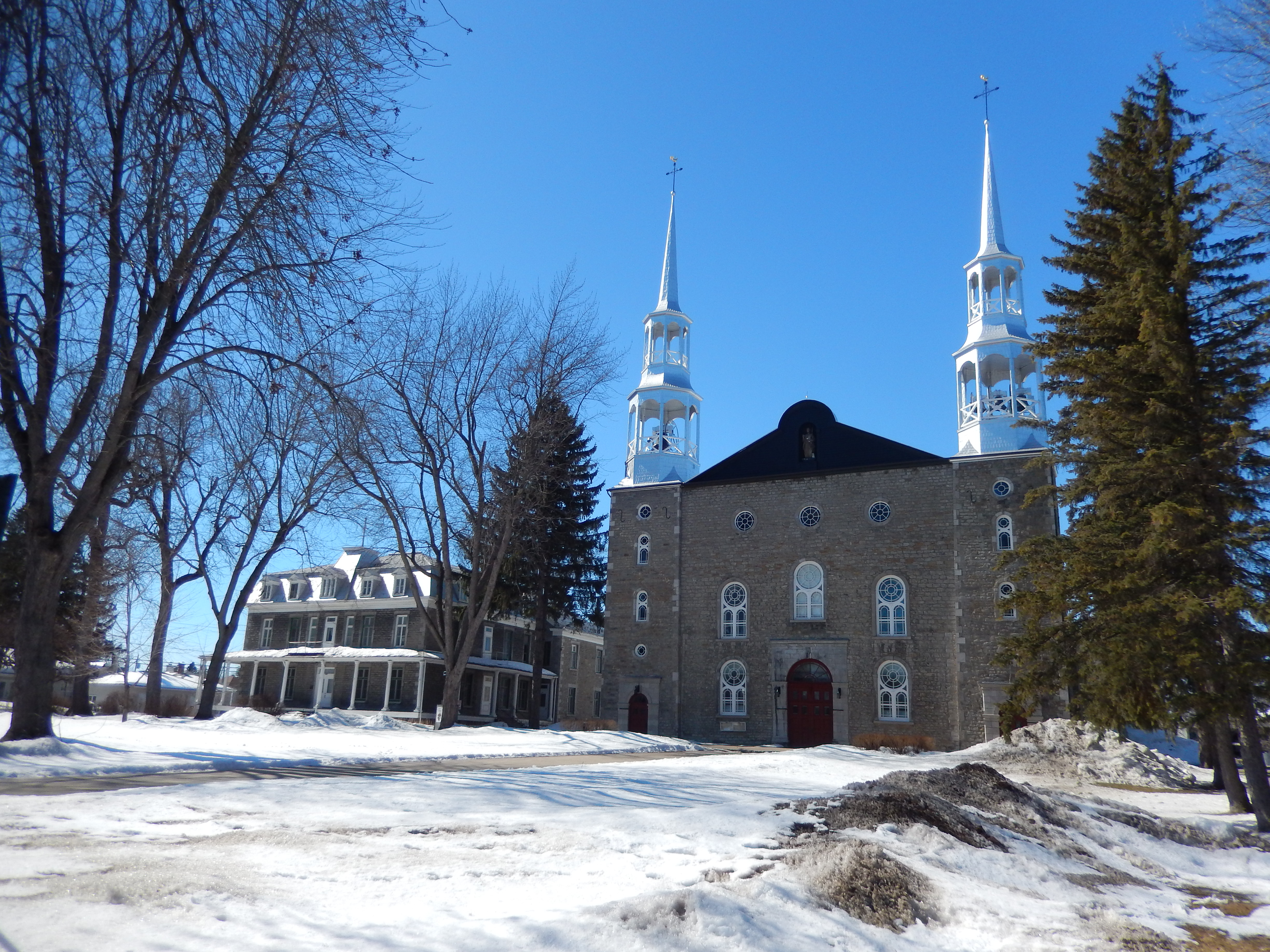
The church of Sainte-Geneviève is an enclave of Sainte-Geneviève-de-Berthier within Berthierville

Originally, the territory where Sainte-Geneviève-de-Berthier currently sits was known as Berthier, en haut. On July 1, 1849. the municipality of Berthier Numéro Un was created, which consisted of most of the current D'Autray RCM. In 1852, the future town of Berthierville (then known only as Berthier) split from the municipality and on July 1, 1855, the municipality disbanded entirely, creating 8 new ones: Saint-Antoine-de-la-Valtrie, L'Isle-du-Pads, Saint-Barthélemi, Saint-Joseph-de-Lanoraie, Saint-Gabriel-de-Brandon, Sainte-Elizabeth, Saint-Cuthbert and Berthier-en-Haut, which, on March 13, 1969, changed its name to the current Sainte-Geneviève-de-Berthier in honor of Saint Genevieve the patroness saint of Paris.

In 1962, Berthierville Town annexed part of Sainte-Geneviève-de-Berthier.

On November 17, 2012, the Parish Municipality of Sainte-Geneviève-de-Berthier changed status to become a regular municipality.

== Demographics ==
=== Population ===
Canada census – Sainte-Geneviève-de-Berthier community profile

	2021	2016	2011
Population	2,253 (-1.2% from 2016)	2,280 (-3.6% from 2011)	2,365 (+2.5% from 2006)
Land area	67.03 km^{2} (25.88 sq mi)	67.62 km^{2} (26.11 sq mi)	66.69 km^{2} (25.75 sq mi)
Population density	33.6/km^{2} (87/sq mi)	33.7/km^{2} (87/sq mi)	35.5/km^{2} (92/sq mi)
Median age	48.8 (M: 47.2, F: 49.6)	46.1 (M: 45.5, F: 46.9)	44.9 (M: 44.9, F: 45.0)
Private dwellings	977 (total) 947 (occupied)	981 (total)	962 (total)
Median household income	$75,500	$65,024	$.N/A

References: 2021 2016 2011

Historical census populations – Sainte-Geneviève-de-Berthier

Year	Pop.	±%
1871	2,245	—
1881	2,222	−1.0%
1891	1,827	−17.8%
1901	1,863	+2.0%
1911	1,814	−2.6%
1921	1,472	−18.9%
1931	1,407	−4.4%
1941	1,560	+10.9%

Year	Pop.	±%
1951	1,895	+21.5%
1956	1,944	+2.6%
1961	1,910	−1.7%
1966	1,517	−20.6%
1971	1,622	+6.9%
1976	1,775	+9.4%
1981	2,126	+19.8%
1986	2,079	−2.2%

Year	Pop.	±%
1991	2,263	+8.9%
1996	2,402	+6.1%
2001	2,387	−0.6%
2006	2,307	−3.4%
2011	2,365	+2.5%
2016	2,280	−3.6%
2021	2,253	−1.2%

Population counts are not adjusted for boundary changes.
Source: Statistics Canada

=== Language ===
Mother tongue (2021):

- English as first language: 0.4%
- French as first language: 97.5%
- English and French as first languages: 0.7%
- Other as first language: 0.7%

== Education ==
The Sir Wilfrid Laurier School Board operates anglophone public schools, including:

- Joliette Elementary School in Saint-Charles-Borromée
- Joliette High School in Joliette

== See also ==
- List of municipalities in Quebec
