= Normandie =

Normandie may refer to:

== Places ==
- Normandy, the geographical and cultural region in North-west Europe called Normandie in French
- Normandy (administrative region), the administrative region of France, also called in French Normandie
- Normandie, New Brunswick, a community in Weldford Parish, New Brunswick, Canada
- Normandie, New Jersey, a community in Monmouth County, New Jersey, United States
- Normandie Avenue, Los Angeles County, California, United States
- Zec Normandie, a Controlled harvesting zone in the Laurentides administrative region, Quebec, Canada

== Military ==
- Normandie-Niemen a French Air Force squadron that served on the Eastern Front of World War II
- Régiment de Normandie, a Royalist French army unit created in 1616

== Ships ==
- SS Normandie (1833), renamed SS La Normandie in 1836, a CGT ocean liner in service 5 May 1833 – Oct 1911, namesake of the SS Normandie (1935)
- French ship Normandie (1835), a Seine ferry built at Le Havre in 1835
- French ironclad Normandie, in service 1862–71
- Normandie-class battleship, five ships planned for use by the French Navy in World War I but never completed
- SS Normandie, an ocean liner in service 1935–39
- MV Normandie, a channel ferry built in 1992
- French frigate Normandie, an Aquitaine-class frigate serving in the French Navy since 2020

== Other uses ==
- Normandie Hotel, a hotel in San Juan, Puerto Rico, inspired by the SS Normandie
- Hotel Normandie (Los Angeles), Los Angeles, California, United States
- Normandie, side project of the band theSTART
- Normandie Apartments, Omaha, Nebraska, USA
- Normandie Apartments, Shanghai, China

== See also ==
- Normandy (disambiguation)
