= Normandy (disambiguation) =

Normandy may refer to:

- Normandy, the geographical and cultural region in North-west Europe
- Normandy (administrative region), the administrative region of France

Normandy may also refer to:

- Upper Normandy, a former region of France
- Lower Normandy, a former region of France

== Historical connections ==
- Duchy of Normandy (911–1290), on which the French Province of Normandy (1204–1790) was predicated
  - The Channel Islands are a former part of the Duchy of Normandy and are known as Les Iles Anglo-Normandes in French.
- Operation Overlord, the 1944 Normandy Campaign of World War II
  - The Normandy landings of 6 June 1944
  - The Normandy American Cemetery and Memorial, established as a result of the 1944 invasion

=== United Kingdom ===
- Normandy, Isles of Scilly
- Normandy, Surrey, England

=== United States ===
- Normandy, Illinois
- Normandy, Missouri
- Normandy, Philadelphia, Pennsylvania
- Normandy, Tennessee
- Normandy, Texas

== Vessels ==
- MS Normandy, a ferry built in 1981
- PS Normandy, a British paddle-wheel steamer which sank in 1870
- USS Normandy, a Ticonderoga-class cruiser of the United States Navy

== Other uses ==
- Normandy Mining, a defunct Australian mining company
- "Normandy" (Sanctuary), a season three episode of the television series Sanctuary
- "Normandy" (Suits), a 2013 television episode
- Normandy (Mass Effect), a starship in the original Mass Effect video game trilogy
- The Normandy, an apartment building in New York City

== See also ==
- Normandie (disambiguation)
