= Clermont, Abitibi-Témiscamingue =

Clermont
- Township municipality
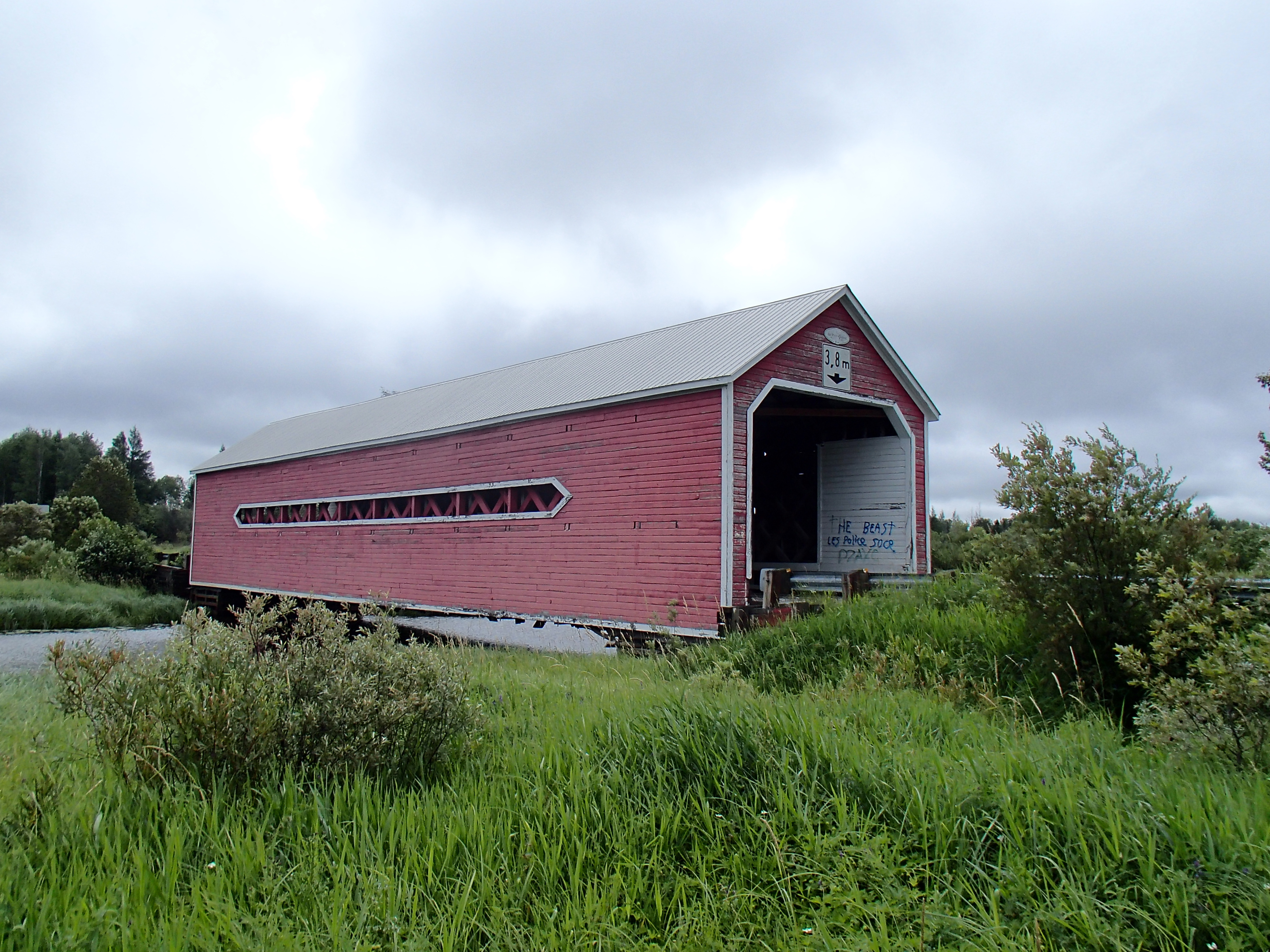
- Pont du Petit-Quatre

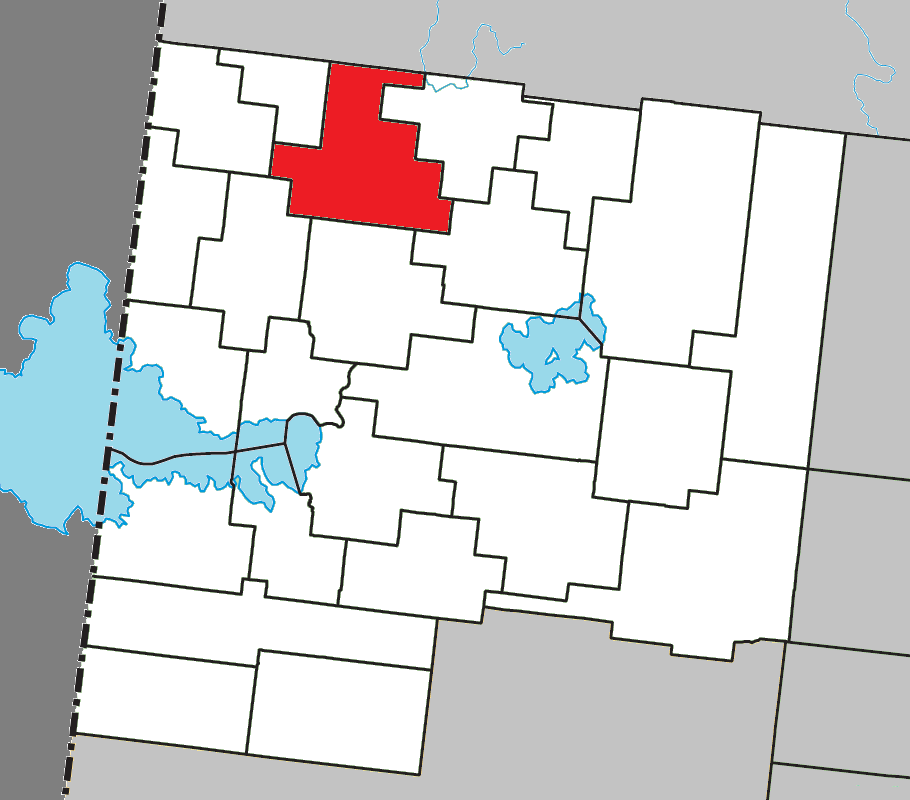
- Location within Abitibi-Ouest RCM

- Location in western Quebec
- Coordinates: 48°55′N 79°10′W
- Country: Canada
- Province: Quebec
- Region: Abitibi-Témiscamingue
- RCM: Abitibi-Ouest
- Settled: 1930s
- Constituted: March 4, 1936

Government
  - Mayor: Daniel Céleste
  - Federal riding: Abitibi—Témiscamingue
  - Prov. riding: Abitibi-Ouest

Area
  - Total: 158.78 km^{2} (61.31 sq mi)
  - Land: 156.66 km^{2} (60.49 sq mi)

Population (2021)
  - Total: 484
  - Density: 3.1/km^{2} (8.0/sq mi)
  - Pop (2016-21): ▼1.6%
  - Dwellings: 218
- Time zone: UTC−5 (EST)
  - Summer (DST): UTC−4 (EDT)
- Postal code(s): J0Z 3M0
- Area code: 819
- Highways: R-111 R-393
- Website: clermont.ao.ca/fr/

Clermont (French pronunciation: [klɛʁmɔ̃]) is a township municipality in northwestern Quebec, Canada, in Abitibi-Ouest Regional County Municipality. It had a population of 484 in the 2021 Canadian census. The population centre itself is sometimes referred to as Saint-Vital-de-Clermont.

The township was incorporated on March 4, 1936.

== History ==
Clermont was officially created on March 4, 1936. Three years later, in 1939, it lost a major section of its territory when Val-Saint-Gilles split from Clermont.

== Demographics ==
In the 2021 Census of Population conducted by Statistics Canada, Clermont had a population of 484 living in 200 of its 218 total private dwellings, a change of −1.6% from its 2016 population of 492. With a land area of 156.66 km^{2} (60.49 sq mi), it had a population density of 3.1/km^{2} (8.0/sq mi) in 2021.

Canada census – Clermont community profile

	2021	2016	2011
Population	484 (-1.6% from 2016)	492 (+2.1% from 2011)	482 (-9.7% from 2006)
Land area	156.66 km^{2} (60.49 sq mi)	157.45 km^{2} (60.79 sq mi)	158.30 km^{2} (61.12 sq mi)
Population density	3.1/km^{2} (8.0/sq mi)	3.1/km^{2} (8.0/sq mi)	3.0/km^{2} (7.8/sq mi)
Median age	44.4 (M: 45.2, F: 44.0)	42.0 (M: 45.9, F: 39.8)	42.2 (M: 45.0, F: 39.5)
Private dwellings	218 (total) 200 (occupied)	214 (total)	208 (total)
Median household income	$83,000	$72,960	$50,407

References: 2021 2016 2011

Historical census populations – Clermont, Abitibi-Témiscamingue, Quebec

Year	Pop.	±%
1941	1,177	—
1951	816	−30.7%
1956	852	+4.4%
1961	853	+0.1%
1966	571	−33.1%
1971	570	−0.2%

Year	Pop.	±%
1976	455	−20.2%
1981	450	−1.1%
1986	483	+7.3%
1991	532	+10.1%
1996	591	+11.1%
2001	555	−6.1%

Year	Pop.	±%
2006	534	−3.8%
2011	482	−9.7%
2016	492	+2.1%
2021	484	−1.6%

Source: Statistics Canada

Canada Census Mother Tongue - Clermont, Abitibi-Témiscamingue, Quebec
Census	Total	French			English			French & English			Other		
Year	Responses	Count	Trend	Pop %	Count	Trend	Pop %	Count	Trend	Pop %	Count	Trend	Pop %
2021	480	465	▼4.1%	96.9%	5	0.0	1.0%	5	▲ n/a%	1.0%	5	▲ n/a%	1.0%
2016	495	485	▲2.1%	98.0%	5	0.0%	1.0%	0	0.0%	0.0%	0	0.0%	0.0%
2011	480	475	▼11.2%	99.0%	5	▲ n/a%	1.0%	0	0.0%	0.0%	0	0.0%	0.0%
2006	535	535	▼2.7%	100.0%	0	0.0%	0.0%	0	0.0%	0.0%	0	0.0%	0.0%
2001	550	550	▼6.8%	100.0%	0	0.0%	0.0%	0	▼100.0%	0.0%	0	0.0%	0.0%
1996	600	590	n/a	98.3%	0	n/a	0.0%	10	n/a	1.7%	0	n/a	0.0%

== Government ==
Alexandre D. Nickner was elected November 3, 2013, as mayor of Clermont. By doing so, he became the youngest mayor of Quebec at the age of only 20 years. After his 4 years' term, Nickner decided to quit politics to focus on his company. Daniel Céleste, deputy mayor during Nickner's period, became mayor by default in November 2017.

List of former mayors:

- Joseph Gauthier (1936–1941)
- Sijefroid Bélair (1941–1945)
- Donat Marier (1945–1950, 1960–1962)
- Henri Pilon (1950–1954)
- Arthur Lauzon (1954–1957)
- Henri Pilon (1957–1958)
- Paul Clément (1958–1960)
- Roland Guindon (1962–1975)
- Roch Gagnon (1975–1993)
- Michel Mercier (1993–2005)
- Lucie Hardy (2005–2009)
- Doris Souligny (2009–2010)
- Robert Paquette (2010–2013)
- Alexandre D. Nickner (2013–2017)
- Daniel Céleste (2017–present)

== See also ==
- List of township municipalities in Quebec
