= Authier-Nord =

- Municipality
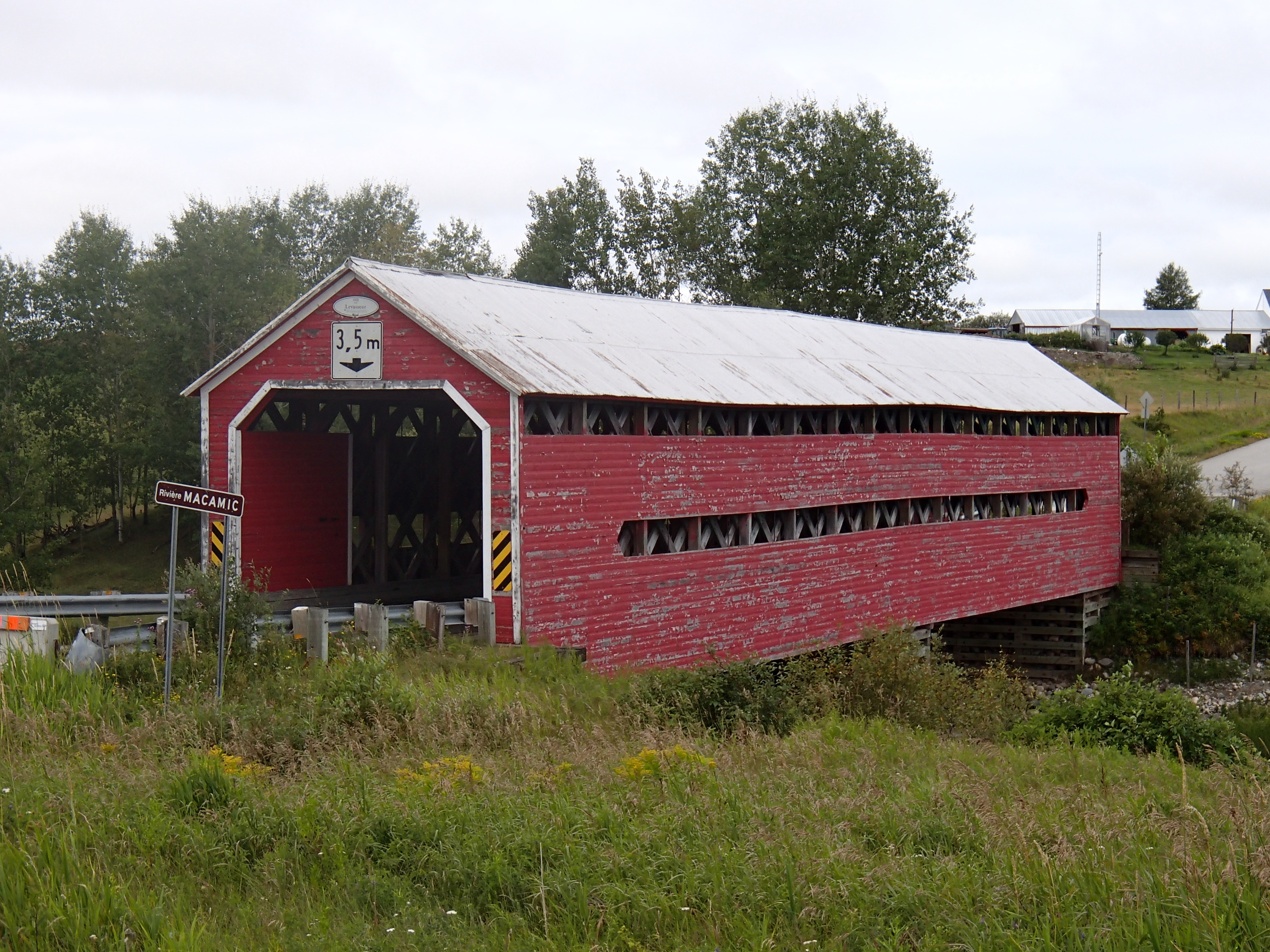
- Levasseur bridge in Authier-Nord

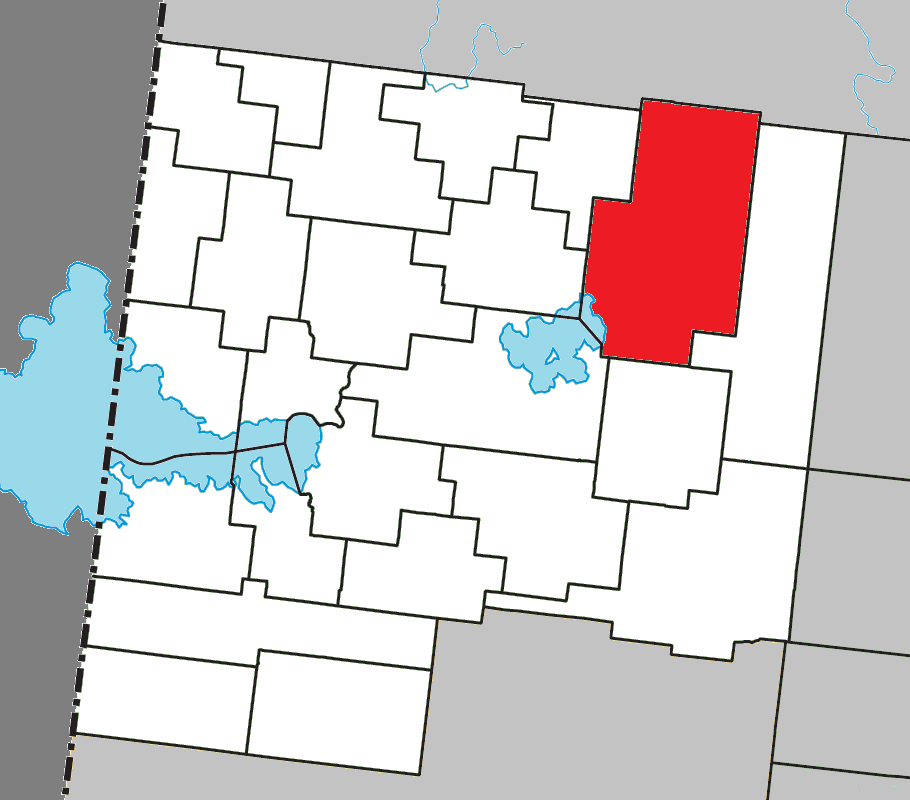
- Location within Abitibi-Ouest RCM

- Location in western Quebec
- Coordinates: 48°50′N 78°52′W
- Country: Canada
- Province: Quebec
- Region: Abitibi-Témiscamingue
- RCM: Abitibi-Ouest
- Settled: c. 1922
- Constituted: January 1, 1983
- Named for: Hector Authier

Government
  - Mayor: Fernand Major
  - Federal riding: Abitibi—Témiscamingue
  - Prov. riding: Abitibi-Ouest

Area
  - Total: 285.69 km^{2} (110.31 sq mi)
  - Land: 278.05 km^{2} (107.36 sq mi)

Population (2021)
  - Total: 288
  - Density: 1/km^{2} (2.6/sq mi)
  - Pop (2016-21): ▼4.0%
  - Dwellings: 159
- Time zone: UTC−05:00 (EST)
  - Summer (DST): UTC−04:00 (EDT)
- Postal code(s): J0Z 1E0
- Area code: 819
- Highways: No major routes
- Website: authier-nord.ao.ca/fr/

Authier-Nord (French pronunciation: [otje nɔʁ]) is a municipality in northwestern Quebec, Canada, in the Abitibi-Ouest Regional County Municipality. It covers 278.05 km^{2} (107.36 sq mi) and had a population of 288 as of the 2021 Canadian census.

The municipality was formed on January 1, 1983, when it partially separated from the Parish Municipality of Macamic.

== Geography ==
=== Climate ===
Climate data for Authier-Nord, Quebec
| Month | Jan | Feb | Mar | Apr | May | Jun | Jul | Aug | Sep | Oct | Nov | Dec | Year |
|---|---|---|---|---|---|---|---|---|---|---|---|---|---|
| Record high °C (°F) | 8.0 (46.4) | 13.5 (56.3) | 18.0 (64.4) | 29.5 (85.1) | 33.5 (92.3) | 35.0 (95.0) | 37.0 (98.6) | 34.4 (93.9) | 32.5 (90.5) | 27.0 (80.6) | 19.0 (66.2) | 14.5 (58.1) | 37.0 (98.6) |
| Mean daily maximum °C (°F) | −11.3 (11.7) | −7.9 (17.8) | −1.2 (29.8) | 7.5 (45.5) | 16.3 (61.3) | 21.8 (71.2) | 23.5 (74.3) | 22.1 (71.8) | 16.6 (61.9) | 8.6 (47.5) | 0.2 (32.4) | −7.2 (19.0) | 7.4 (45.3) |
| Daily mean °C (°F) | −18.1 (−0.6) | −15.7 (3.7) | −8.9 (16.0) | 0.8 (33.4) | 8.6 (47.5) | 14.0 (57.2) | 16.3 (61.3) | 15.1 (59.2) | 10.6 (51.1) | 3.9 (39.0) | −3.9 (25.0) | −12.8 (9.0) | 0.8 (33.4) |
| Mean daily minimum °C (°F) | −24.9 (−12.8) | −23.5 (−10.3) | −16.5 (2.3) | −6.0 (21.2) | 0.9 (33.6) | 6.3 (43.3) | 9.0 (48.2) | 8.0 (46.4) | 4.6 (40.3) | −0.9 (30.4) | −8.0 (17.6) | −18.4 (−1.1) | −5.8 (21.6) |
| Record low °C (°F) | −50.5 (−58.9) | −48.5 (−55.3) | −48.0 (−54.4) | −33.3 (−27.9) | −17.0 (1.4) | −7.5 (18.5) | −4.5 (23.9) | −5.0 (23.0) | −10.0 (14.0) | −16.1 (3.0) | −36.1 (−33.0) | −47.5 (−53.5) | −50.5 (−58.9) |
| Average precipitation mm (inches) | 44.5 (1.75) | 32.4 (1.28) | 46.6 (1.83) | 56.4 (2.22) | 78.0 (3.07) | 94.0 (3.70) | 112.4 (4.43) | 97.7 (3.85) | 113.9 (4.48) | 88.3 (3.48) | 70.8 (2.79) | 51.0 (2.01) | 885.9 (34.88) |
| Average rainfall mm (inches) | 2.8 (0.11) | 3.0 (0.12) | 12.0 (0.47) | 39.5 (1.56) | 74.8 (2.94) | 94.0 (3.70) | 112.4 (4.43) | 97.7 (3.85) | 113.1 (4.45) | 80.5 (3.17) | 37.4 (1.47) | 5.8 (0.23) | 672.9 (26.49) |
| Average snowfall cm (inches) | 41.8 (16.5) | 29.4 (11.6) | 34.6 (13.6) | 17.3 (6.8) | 3.2 (1.3) | 0.0 (0.0) | 0.0 (0.0) | 0.0 (0.0) | 0.7 (0.3) | 7.9 (3.1) | 33.4 (13.1) | 45.2 (17.8) | 213.5 (84.1) |
| Average precipitation days (≥ 0.2 mm) | 13.0 | 10.2 | 10.6 | 10.3 | 12.4 | 14.6 | 15.9 | 14.7 | 17.1 | 16.6 | 15.2 | 14.4 | 165.0 |
| Average rainy days (≥ 0.2 mm) | 0.9 | 0.9 | 2.9 | 7.2 | 11.8 | 14.6 | 15.9 | 14.7 | 17.0 | 14.6 | 6.4 | 1.8 | 108.6 |
| Average snowy days (≥ 0.2 cm) | 12.4 | 9.8 | 8.3 | 4.4 | 1.0 | 0.0 | 0.0 | 0.0 | 0.3 | 3.1 | 10.4 | 13.2 | 62.9 |
Source: Environment Canada Canadian Climate Normals 1981–2010 (based on the Lac Berry weather station

== Demographics ==
=== Population ===
Canada census – Authier-Nord community profile

| | 2021 | 2016 | 2011 |
| Population | 288 (-4.0% from 2016) | 300 (9.9% from 2011) | 273 (-13.9% from 2006) |
| Land area | 278.05 km^{2} (107.36 sq mi) | 279.94 km^{2} (108.09 sq mi) | 280.92 km^{2} (108.46 sq mi) |
| Population density | 1/km^{2} (2.6/sq mi) | 1.1/km^{2} (2.8/sq mi) | 1.0/km^{2} (2.6/sq mi) |
| Median age | 51.6 (M: 54.4, F: 49.6) | 42.7 (M: 43.0, F: 42.6) | 37.9 (M: 34.5, F: 41.0) |
| Private dwellings | 159 (total) 128 (occupied) | 164 (total) | 103 (total) |
| Median household income | $68,500 | $61,568 | $62,553 |

References: 2021 2016 2011

Historical Census Data - Authier-Nord, Quebec

| Year | Pop. | ±% |
|---|---|---|
| 1986 | 390 | — |
| 1991 | 377 | −3.3% |
| 1996 | 374 | −0.8% |
| 2001 | 337 | −9.9% |

| Year | Pop. | ±% |
|---|---|---|
| 2006 | 317 | −5.9% |
| 2011 | 273 | −13.9% |
| 2016 | 300 | +9.9% |
| 2021 | 288 | −4.0% |

Source: Statistics Canada

=== Language ===
Canada Census Mother Tongue - Authier-Nord, Quebec
| Census | Total | French | | | English | | | French & English | | | Other | | |
| Year | Responses | Count | Trend | Pop % | Count | Trend | Pop % | Count | Trend | Pop % | Count | Trend | Pop % |
| 2021 | 290 | 285 | ▼5.0% | 98.3% | 0 | 0.0% | 0.0% | 0 | 0.0% | 0.0% | 0 | 0.0% | 0.0% |
| 2016 | 300 | 300 | ▲9.1% | 100.0% | 0 | 0.0% | 0.0% | 0 | 0.0% | 0.0% | 0 | 0.0% | 0.0% |
| 2011 | 275 | 275 | 0.0% | 100.0% | 0 | 0.0% | 0.0% | 0 | 0.0% | 0.0% | 0 | 0.0% | 0.0% |
| 2006 | 275 | 275 | ▼19.1% | 100.0% | 0 | 0.0% | 0.0% | 0 | 0.0% | 0.0% | 0 | 0.0% | 0.0% |
| 2001 | 340 | 340 | ▼11.7% | 100.0% | 0 | 0.0% | 0.0% | 0 | 0.0% | 0.0% | 0 | 0.0% | 0.0% |
| 1996 | 385 | 385 | n/a | 100.0% | 0 | n/a | 0.0% | 0 | n/a | 0.0% | 0 | n/a | 0.0% |

== Government ==
Municipal council (as of 2024):

- Mayor: Fernand Major
- Councillors: Luc Raby, Jean-Marc Neveu, Michelle D'Amours, Sylvain Caron, Florence Duguay, Serge Lefebvre

== See also ==
- List of municipalities in Quebec
