= Saint-Dominique-du-Rosaire =

- Municipality
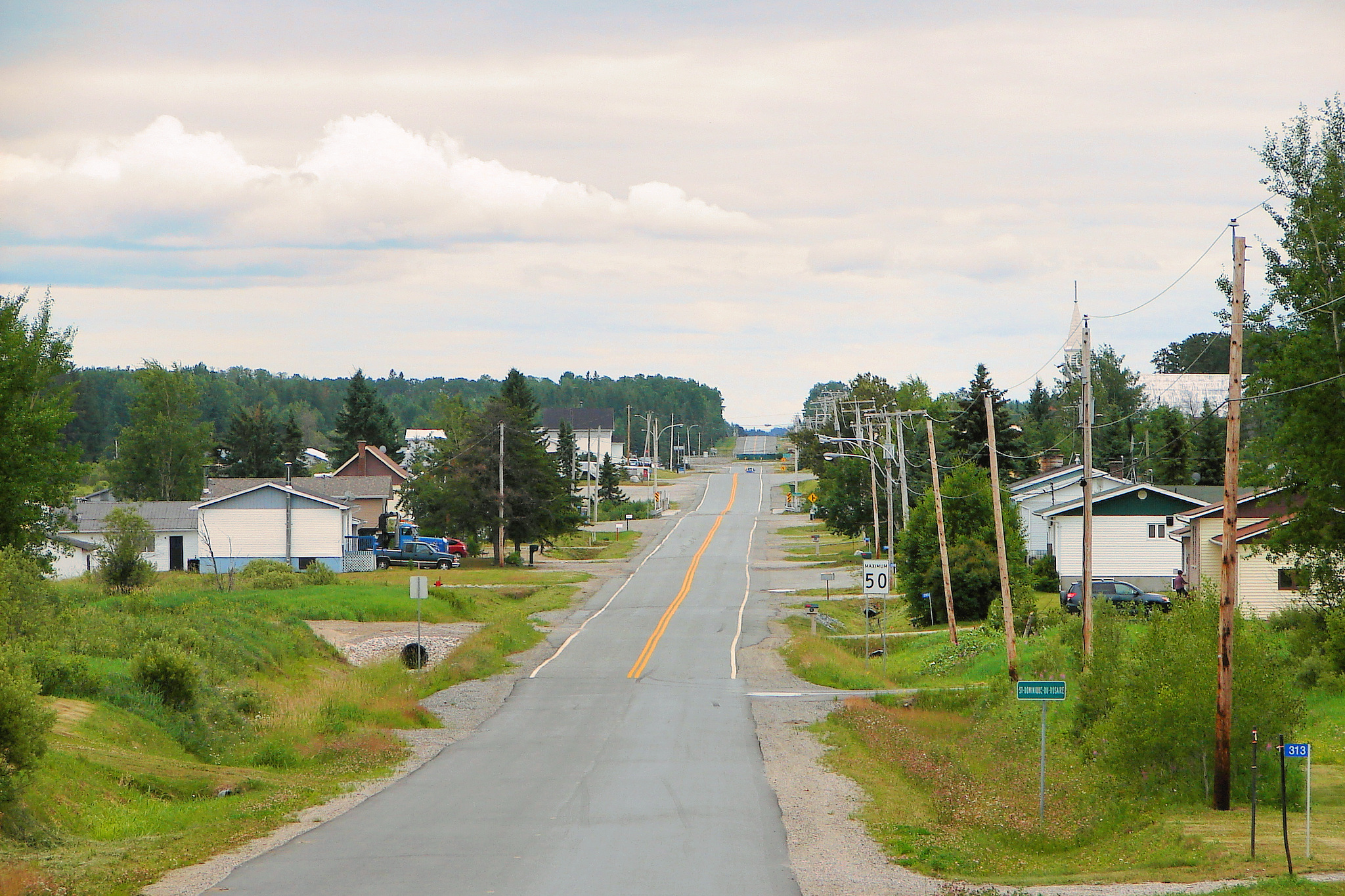

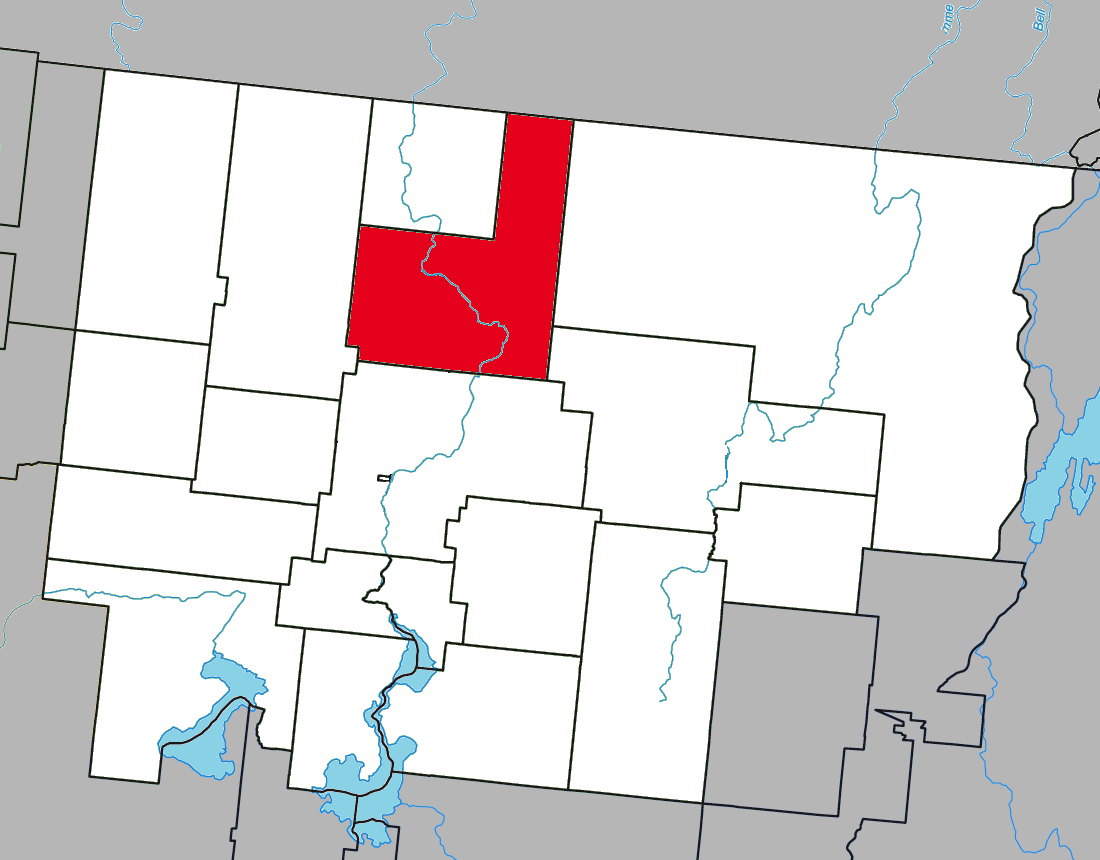
- Location within Abitibi RCM

- Location in western Quebec
- Coordinates: 48°46′N 78°07′W
- Country: Canada
- Province: Quebec
- Region: Abitibi-Témiscamingue
- RCM: Abitibi
- Settled: c. 1924
- Constituted: January 1, 1978

Government
  - Mayor: Christian Legault
  - Federal riding: Abitibi—Témiscamingue
  - Prov. riding: Abitibi-Ouest

Area
  - Total: 505.07 km^{2} (195.01 sq mi)
  - Land: 479.89 km^{2} (185.29 sq mi)

Population (2021)
  - Total: 434
  - Density: 0.9/km^{2} (2.3/sq mi)
  - Pop (2016-21): ▼3.6%
  - Dwellings: 205
- Time zone: UTC−05:00 (EST)
  - Summer (DST): UTC−04:00 (EDT)
- Postal code(s): J0Y 2K0
- Area code: 819
- Highways: R-109
- Website: st-dominique-du-rosaire.org

Saint-Dominique-du-Rosaire (French pronunciation: [sɛ̃ dɔminik dy ʁozɛʁ]) is a municipality in the Canadian province of Quebec, located in the Abitibi Regional County Municipality in the Abitibi-Témiscamingue region. It is part of the census agglomeration of Amos.

The municipality owes its name to Monsignor Élie-Anicet Latulipe, who wished to place the parish under the protection of the founder of the Dominican order, Domingo de Guzmán. This saint also popularised devotion to the rosary, an aspect that fully explains the municipality's name.

== Demographics ==
In the 2021 Census of Population conducted by Statistics Canada, Saint-Dominique-du-Rosaire had a population of 434 living in 193 of its 205 total private dwellings, a change of −3.6% from its 2016 population of 450. With a land area of 479.89 km^{2} (185.29 sq mi), it had a population density of 0.9/km^{2} (2.3/sq mi) in 2021.

Historical census populations – Saint-Dominique-du-Rosaire

Year	Pop.	±%
1981	533	—
1986	465	−12.8%
1991	479	+3.0%
1996	457	−4.6%
2001	476	+4.2%

Year	Pop.	±%
2006	447	−6.1%
2011	434	−2.9%
2016	450	+3.7%
2021	434	−3.6%

Source: Statistics Canada

The municipality had a population of 434 in the 2021 Canadian Census. As of the 2021 census, mother tongues spoken are:

- English as first language: 0%
- French as first language: 100%
- English and French as first language: 0%
- Other as first language: 0%

== Government ==
Municipal council (as of Nov. 2023):

- Mayor: Christian Legault
- Councillors: Nicholas Paradis-Naud, Michelle St-Laurent, Christiane Vaillancourt, Gilles Audet, Pierrette Morin, Pascal Hétu
