= Georgetown Leadership Seminar =

The Georgetown Leadership Seminar (GLS) is an annual gathering of selected rising leaders from around the world for a week of intensive discussion on major international issues. The program was established in 1982 by Georgetown University in order to promote dialogue among individuals who would shape the futures of their countries. GLS attracts individuals from government, corporations, law firms, financial institutions, the military, international organizations, NGOs, the media, universities, think tanks, and elsewhere who occupy positions of influence and have the potential to move up to greater leadership roles. The selected participants are then exposed to the major global issues and the Washington foreign policy-making process through direct contact with top level policy makers and experts. The program is derived from Harvard’s “international seminar” conducted by Henry Kissinger in the 1950s and 1960s. The GLS is now administered by the Institute for the Study of Diplomacy at the School of Foreign Service at Georgetown. Original committee members included Zbigniew Brzezinski, Madeleine Albright, Henry Kissinger, and Peter F. Krogh.

== Objectives ==
The core belief underlying the GLS is that successful leaders in a globalized world must continually work to improve their understanding of international affairs and connect to an international network. This is accomplished through three distinct goals:

1. To promote an exchange of views among emerging public and private sector leaders on key global issues of the future.
2. To establish the personal contacts and sense of camaraderie essential to effective international cooperation.
3. To improve understanding by foreign leaders of the perspectives and foreign policy-making process through direct contact with key policy-makers, academics, and other experts in Washington.

== Notable Speakers ==
Since 1982, the GLS has attracted a variety of speakers who have served in important policy-making and business roles:

- Madeleine Albright - U.S. Secretary of State in the Clinton Administration
- Senator Chuck Hagel - Former Senator of Nebraska and U.S. Secretary of Defense
- Andrew Natsios - Former Administrator of USAID
- Alice Rivlin - Former Vice Chairman of the Federal Reserve
- Paul Begala - American political commentator
- Chester Crocker – Assistant Secretary of State for African Affairs
- Peter Krogh - Dean of the Edmund A. Walsh School of Foreign Service at Georgetown University
- Robert Gallucci - Dean of the Edmund A. Walsh School of Foreign Service at Georgetown University; President of the John D. and Catherine T. MacArthur Foundation
- Carol Lancaster - Dean of the Edmund A. Walsh School of Foreign Service at Georgetown University
- Shashi Tharoor – United Nations Under-Secretary General and Member of Parliament of India
- John DeGioia - President of Georgetown University
- Paul Erdman - Financial Writer and Scholar
- Francois Bourguignon - Chief Economist of the World Bank
- Mitchell Reiss – Special Envoy to Northern Ireland
- Charles Cook - American political analyst
- Victor Cha - Director for Asian Affairs at the National Security Council and Georgetown University professor
- George Tenet - Director of the CIA
- Thomas Pickering – US Ambassador to the United Nations

== Select Alumni ==
GLS has over 800 alumni from more than 100 countries, including presidents, prime ministers, cabinet secretaries, generals, ambassadors, and CEOs:

- Vincent Siew - (GLS 1982) former Prime Minister and former Vice President of Taiwan
- Thomas D. Boyatt- (GLS 1983) former diplomat and United States Ambassador to Burkina Faso (1978–80) and Colombia (1980–83)
- Alain Juppe - (GLS 1983) former Foreign Minister and former Prime Minister of France
- Jaswant Singh - (GLS 1983) Indian Member of Parliament, former Minister of Finance, Minister of Defense, and Minister of External Affairs of India
- Roberto Dañino - (GLS 1983) former Prime Minister of Peru
- Michael Howard - (GLS 1983) British Leader of the Conservative Party and Leader of the Opposition
- Ritt Bjerregaard - (GLS 1984) former Danish politician and was the first female Lord Mayor of Copenhagen
- César Gaviria Trujillo - (GLS 1984) former Secretary General of the Organization of American States, former President of Colombia
- Patricia M. Byrne - (GLS 1984) served as United States Ambassador to Burma and United States Ambassador to Mali
- Michael Huffington- (GlS 1984) former U.S. Congressman from the 22nd district of California
- Juwono Sudarsono - (GLS 1985) former Defense Minister of Indonesia
- Helle Degn - (GLS 1985) Danish politician
- James Goodby - (GLS 1985) author and former American diplomat as United States Ambassador to Finland
- Yossi Beilin - (GLS 1986) Israeli statesman and scholar that has served as Minister of Economics and Planning, Minister of Justice, and Minister of Religious Affairs
- Anura Bandaranaike - (GLS 1987) Former Cabinet Minister of Foreign Affairs, Higher Education, Tourism and National Heritage and former Speaker of the Parliament of Sri Lanka
- Mary Collins - (GLS 1987) former Canadian Minister of National Health and Welfare
- In Jaw Lai - (GLS 1987) former President of the Judicial Yuan and Chief Justice of the Court of Taiwan
- Jens Stoltenberg - (GLS 1988) Current Prime Minister and former Finance Minister of Norway
- Jean-Marie Guehenno - (GLS 1989) former Undersecretary General of the United Nations
- Sondhi Limthongkul - (GLS 1991) Inaugural Leader of the New Politics Party of Thailand
- General Peter Pace - (GLS 1992) former Chairman of the Joint Chiefs of Staff
- Frances Fitzgerald - Irish Fine Gael politician and the Minister for Children and Youth Affairs
- Jose Barroso - (GLS 1998) President of EU Commission and former Prime Minister of Portugal
- Michael Hayden - (GLS 1999) former Director of the CIA and former Director of the NSA
- Felipe de Borbon - (GLS 1999) Prince of Asturias; Heir Apparent to the Spanish Throne
- Martin Redrado - (GLS 1999) Former President of the Central Bank of Argentina
- Isaac Lee Possin - (GLS 1999) President of News for Univision
- Giorgi Baramidze - Georgian politician who served as Vice-Prime Minister of Georgia and State Minister for Euro-Atlantic Integration
- Kayode Fayemi - (GLS 2000) Governor of Ekiti State, Nigeria
- Moushira Khattab (GLS 2001)- former Minister of Family & Population of Egypt, Ambassador of Egypt to the Republic of South Africa, the Czech Republic and Slovakia
- Henrique Capriles Radonski - (GLS 2002) Opposition candidate in the 2012 Venezuelan presidential election
- Mahmoud Mohieldin - (GLS 2003) Managing Director of the World Bank, former Egyptian Minister of Investment
- Nasser Judeh - (GLS 2004) Jordanian Minister of Foreign Affairs
- Maung Zarni - (GLS 2004) Burmese democracy activist; founder of the Free Burma Coalition
- David M. Rodriguez - (GLS 2004) United States Army General who currently serves as the Commander, United States Africa Command (AFRICOM)
- Muhamad Chatib Basri - (GLS 2005) is the Indonesian Minister of Finance
- Nuhu Ribadu - (GLS 2006) Chairman of the Petroleum Revenue Task Force and former Nigerian government anti-corruption official; Nigerian presidential candidate
- Anne Lammila - (GLS 2007) Finland’s Ambassador to Mexico
- Yousef Al-Otaiba - (GLS 2007) UAE Ambassador to the United States
- Ragnheiður Elín Árnadóttir - (GLS 2007) Icelandic politician and the Minister of Industry and Commerce
- Laila Iskander - (GLS 2007) Egyptian social entrepreneur and politician and Egypt's Minister of State for Environment Affairs
- Donald Duke - (GLS 2008) Governor of the Cross River State of Nigeria
- Fatemeh Haghighatjoo - (GLS 2009) Reformist and member of the Iranian Parliament
- Tomasz Misiak – (GLS 2010) Polish Senator
- Ignacio Bustamante - (GLS 2011) CEO of Hochschild Mining (Peru)
- Abdelmalek Kettani - (GLS 2006) Ambassador of the Kingdom of Morocco to the Republic of Ivory Coast (2016-current)
