= Bids for the 2022 Commonwealth Games =

Overview
- XXII Commonwealth Games
- Winner: Birmingham

Details
- Committee: CGF

Map
- Location of the bidding cities

Important dates
- Bid: 19 June 2017
- Decision: 21 December 2017

Decision
- Winner: Birmingham

The city of Durban, South Africa was initially elected as the host for the 2022 Commonwealth Games on 2 September 2015, at a General Assembly in Auckland, New Zealand. It was reported in February 2017 however, Durban may be unable to host the games due to financial constraints. On 13 March 2017, the Commonwealth Games Federation (CGF) stripped Durban of their rights to host. On 21 December 2017, Birmingham was awarded the 2022 Games as Durban's replacement host. Louise Martin, president of the Commonwealth Games Federation, made the official announcement at a press conference at the Arena Academy in Birmingham.

== Bids for the 2nd election ==
=== Official bids ===
City	Country	Commonwealth Games Committee	Website	Result
Birmingham	England	Commonwealth Games England (CGE)	birmingham2022.com	Winner
Further information: Birmingham bid for the 2022 Commonwealth Games On 19 June 2017 Birmingham officially announced its bid to host the games. The English city said that 95 per cent of competition venues are already in place should they be awarded the multi-sport event by the Commonwealth Games Federation (CGF). An enhanced and refurbished Alexander Stadium is central to Birmingham's bid for the Games, with the venue earmarked to stage the opening and closing ceremonies, as well as athletics. Birmingham 2022 also highlighted the city's ability to stage major sporting events by pointing to the ICC Champions Trophy and The Ashes held at Edgbaston, as well as Rugby World Cup fixtures staged at Villa Park. The new-build Sandwell Aquatics Centre would host swimming, Para-swimming and diving. The Ericsson Indoor Arena in Coventry, located around 20 miles from Birmingham, would host the netball competition. On 7 September 2017, it was announced that Birmingham had been selected as the government's choice for an English bid for the Games, beating a bid from Liverpool. It was announced a formal bid will be submitted to the CGF after they cleared the bid to proceed.

=== Cancelled/Eliminated bids ===
City	Country	Commonwealth Games Committee	Website	Result
Victoria	Canada	Commonwealth Games Canada (CGC)	2022victoria.com	Cancelled
Further information: Victoria bid for the 2022 Commonwealth Games On 30 June 2017 Victoria officially announced its bid to host the games. Bid committee chair David Black announced the bid was submitted with letters of support from the provincial government, local municipalities and the University of Victoria. Lisa Helps, the mayor of Victoria, revealed on 30 April 2017 that the City of Victoria was exploring a possible bid for the 2022 Commonwealth Games. The city is in the process of securing financial support from the regional, provincial and federal government in the event Victoria is awarded the games with hopes that the provincial and federal government would be prepared to cover 75% of the estimated $1 billion budget. Victoria last hosted the 1994 Commonwealth Games. On 24 August 2017 the British Columbia government revealed that it won't support Victoria 2022 Commonwealth games bid.
Liverpool	England	Commonwealth Games England (CGE)	liverpoolcg22.org	Eliminated By Birmingham
Further information: Liverpool bid for the 2022 Commonwealth Games On 16 June 2017 Liverpool officially announced its bid to host the 2022 Commonwealth Games. Liverpool FC's Anfield stadium has been cited as the venue for the opening ceremony and rugby sevens, while St George's Hall and Everton FC's Goodison Park would host the squash and boxing finals respectively and Stanley Park would stage the lawn bowls. The city is proposing to host swimming at a new 50 metres pool within the city centre dock system that would remain in place after the Games and provide both a swimming and visitor attraction legacy. Among the other proposals is triple jump, long jump and pole vault on the dockside by neighbouring Mann Island. Twenty20 cricket and track cycling, as Liverpool 2022's "optional sports", would take place in Manchester at Old Trafford Cricket Ground and the city's Velodrome. The Arena and Convention Centre (ACC) Liverpool, home to the 11,000-seat Echo Arena, BT Convention Centre and Exhibition Centre, would stage badminton, artistic gymnastics, judo, netball and wrestling. On 7 September, It was announced that the UK Government would be supporting the Bid By Birmingham meaning Liverpool would not proceed further.

=== Proposed bids which did not go to application ===
- Kuala Lumpur, Malaysia

Malaysia expressed its willingness to replace Durban as the 2022 Commonwealth Games host. The Olympic Council of Malaysia (OCM) president, Prince Imran, who was also a former President of the Commonwealth Games Federation, said that Malaysia was ready to step in. However, he also said the bid will depend if the OCM gets the government approval to do so. "We (OCM) are keen to host the Games as we had organised the Games in Kuala Lumpur in 1998. We also have all the facilities and stadiums to organise the Games", he said. Malaysia first hosted the 1998 Commonwealth Games. Recently, National Sports Complex in Bukit Jalil was being renovated for preparation of 29th Southeast Asian Games. Later, Imran suggested that Kuala Lumpur would be willing to wait to enter the race for the 2026 event instead of staging it in 2022.

- London and Manchester, England

David Grevemberg, CEO of CGF stated on 15 March 2017 that officials of the organisation had received interest from four cities of England; Birmingham, Liverpool, London, and Manchester, with the possibility of considering a joint-host bid from all four cities. Both Birmingham and Liverpool had also announced their plans to bid for the 2026 Commonwealth Games, with Manchester having previously hosted the 2002 Commonwealth Games. London which hosted the 2012 Summer Olympics and the 1934 British Empire Games (now known as the Commonwealth Games), expressed their interested in a joint-city bid on 15 March 2017. London and Manchester withdrew interest in hosting the 2022 Commonwealth Games, leaving Birmingham and Liverpool as the England's potential candidate cities.

- Wales

Wales considered a joint bid with a UK city such as Liverpool or Birmingham, following the CGF stating that they would consider a joint bid for the 2022 games. On 27 May 2017, The Welsh Government said it was in "discussions" with interested UK bidding cities to host events in 2022. They were hoping to host cycling's road race, triathlon, rowing, sailing or open water swimming in 2022 to "fit in with Wales' great outdoors unique selling point". Cardiff last hosted the British Empire Games in 1958. Cardiff Council considered a bid for the 2026 Commonwealth Games and worked closely with engineering firm Arup to establish the modifications needed for certain possible venues and the cost of doing so. After cost predictions increased to £1.3-£1.5 billion, the project was scrapped. It is now working towards a multi-city Welsh bid post 2030.

- Edmonton and Toronto, Canada

Two cities from Canada initially cited an interest in a Commonwealth Games bid, before primary focus shifted to Victoria. Despite dropping out of the 1st election in 2015 due to failing oil prices, Edmonton revealed they could put themselves forward once again as a candidate for the 2022 Games. Authorities decided to shift their focus the 2026 event however.
On 23 March 2017, Toronto City Council announced they were exploring plans to bid for the 2022 Commonwealth Games. Councillor James Pasternak has also filed a motion. Toronto hosted the 2015 Pan American Games and Parapan American Games and they would use the infrastructure and facilities which were built for those games. However the proposal was dead after city staffs recommendation that Toronto not go ahead with the bid because of the risks and potential high costs.

- Sydney, Melbourne, Adelaide and Perth, Australia

In August 2016, when concerns about Durban's capacity to hold the games was raised, Sam Coffa, the President of the Australian Commonwealth Games Association, enacted preparations for an Australian city to host the 2022 Commonwealth Games, should Durban pull out, or be stripped of the games.
On 23 July 2017, Chief Executive of the Australian Commonwealth Games Association (CGA) Craig Phillips revealed that Australia would only put forward a formal bid to the Commonwealth Games Federation (CGF) as last resort and if an alternative host could not be found. He citied the unwillingness of the CGF to host two consecutive games in the same country as the rationale behind the decision but stressed Australia is still open to hosting.
The New South Wales city of Sydney was Coffa's preferred choice, stating that "the proposal of a city like Sydney is appetising because if Australia was tapped on the shoulder, we're not stupid, we would be looking where the infrastructure is on the ground." Premier of New South Wales Gladys Berejiklian openly supported a Sydney bid, remarking that the games would be an opportunity to "show off our great city and sporting facilities to the world." Sydney previously hosted the 2000 Summer Olympics and 1938 British Empire Games.
On 14 March 2017, Premier of Victoria Daniel Andrews, stated the Government of Victoria had not ruled out placing a bid to host the 2022 games, having previously hosted the 2006 Commonwealth Games and 1956 Summer Olympics.
On 18 March 2017, it was suggested that Adelaide in South Australia, had taken an interest in bidding for this event. Adelaide is the only state capital on the mainland not to have hosted a games. Sydney, Melbourne, Brisbane and Perth have all been selected and the Gold Coast is hosting in 2018. Adelaide did bid for the Games in 1998 but lost to Malaysia, with Kuala Lumpur selected.
On 16 March 2017, Perth's Lord Mayor Lisa Scaffidi, said that if the Government of Western Australia were to bid for the games, she would support it. She stated, "An event of the scale of the Commonwealth Games would further enhance Perth as a world-class city and destination and greatly stimulate the economy, the city of Perth would definitely support the WA Government if it was to put forward a bid to host the Games." Perth last hosted the Commonwealth Games back in 1962.

== Bids for the 1st election ==
=== Official bids ===
Two cities made confirmed bids for the games; Durban, South Africa and Edmonton, Alberta, Canada. Edmonton withdrew its bid in February 2015, leaving Durban as the only bid to go forward to CGF General Assembly in September 2015.

City	Country	Commonwealth Games Committee	Result
Durban	South Africa	South African Sports Confederation and Olympic Committee (SASCOC)	Winner
Further information: Durban bid for the 2022 Commonwealth Games The coastal South African city had previously considered bidding for the 2020 or 2024 Summer Olympics. If Durban were to host the games, it would be the first Commonwealth Games held on the African continent. South Africa's second largest city, Cape Town bid for the 2004 Summer Olympics, but lost out to Athens. Durban is home to major professional rugby union, cricket and two association football teams – AmaZulu F.C. and Golden Arrows. The city has previously played host to matches of the 2010 FIFA World Cup, the 1996 & 2013 Africa Cup of Nations, the 1995 Rugby World Cup, as well as the 2003 Cricket World Cup. The Kings Park Sporting Precinct will be part of the bid. In addition Durban also hosted the 123rd IOC Session. It was reported in February 2017 however, Durban might be unable to host the games due to financial constraints. This was confirmed one month later on 13 March 2017 when the Commonwealth Games Federation (CGF) stripped Durban of their rights to host.
Edmonton	Canada	Commonwealth Games Canada (CGC)	Withdrawn
Further information: Edmonton bid for the 2022 Commonwealth Games Edmonton is Canada's fifth-largest city and the second-largest city in the Province of Alberta. It is home to a number of professional sports associations (most notably the Edmonton Eskimos (Canadian) football team and Edmonton Oilers ice hockey team, winners of five Stanley Cups). The 1978 Commonwealth Games, the 1983 Summer Universiade and the 2001 World Championships in Athletics were all held in Edmonton, and the city has also hosted some matches of the 2006 Women's Rugby World Cup, the 2007 FIFA U-20 World Cup, the 2014 FIFA U-20 Women's World Cup and the 2015 FIFA Women's World Cup. There are also plans to build a new Velodrome to replace the ageing Argyll Velodrome. On 11 February 2015, Edmonton announced it was withdrawing to host the 2022 Commonwealth Games, citing financial reasons and a global fall in oil prices. The bid team will instead focus on the 2026 event.

=== Proposed bids which did not go to application ===
The following cities proposed bidding; however, they did not bid or even formally announce their intentions to bid.

- Hambantota, Sri Lanka

Hambantota bid to host the 2018 Commonwealth Games but lost to Gold Coast. Following their defeat Ajith Nivard who served as co-chairman of the bid suggested that Hambantota could bid again. Despite Hambantota's failure to secure the 2018 games, the city is moving ahead with the construction of most of the venues that would be needed.

- Singapore

Singapore's Director of the Sports Division in its Ministry of Community Development, Koh Peng Keng, said that Singapore could potentially host the Commonwealth Games. Singapore hosted the 2010 Summer Youth Olympics and the 2009 Asian Youth Games. Singapore also hosted various other Southeast Asian Games (SEA Games), AFF, and AFC competitions.

- Cardiff, Wales

Cardiff was previously interested in bidding for the 2022 games, with some events to be held in Newport and Swansea, however Cardiff Council announced they are instead in discussions for a bid for the 2026 games.

- England

The following cities from England were planning for the Commonwealth Games bid:
Birmingham
The Birmingham Post reported in 2009 that Birmingham was considering a bid for the 2022 or 2026 Commonwealth Games, but in September 2013 the city council ceased pursuing to host the games, citing a lack of funds to do so.
Bristol
Bristol Mayor candidate Marvin Rees pledged to bid for either the 2022 or 2026 Games if elected in the Bristol mayoral election, 2012. Bristol's two professional football sides Bristol City and Bristol Rovers backed the proposal, with both sides proposed stadiums (Bristol City Stadium and UWE Stadium) expected to be part of the bid. Bristol Rugby have also endorsed the bid. However Rees lost the election to independent George Ferguson, who had no plans to bid for the Commonwealth Games.
London
The BBC reported on 18 March 2013 that London was considering a bid for the 2022 Commonwealth Games, on the back of its hosting the 2012 Summer Olympics. However, in October later that year there were doubts over whether the bid would continue to go ahead. Mayor of London Boris Johnson expressed concerns that the city would not be able to afford the estimated £1 billion budget.

- Christchurch, New Zealand

After the major earthquakes in September 2010 and February 2011, the rebuilt city was planning to bid for the 2022 edition to introduce the city to the world. The idea was floated by businessman Humphry Rolleston during draft central city plan hearings, and the mayor, Bob Parker, took up the idea. Christchurch previously hosted the Commonwealth Games (then British Commonwealth Games) in 1974. Christchurch's, and any bid from the Oceania Region, was later put in doubt with the awarding of the 2018 games to Gold Coast, Australia.

== Initial concerns over lack of hosting interest ==
On 22 January 2014, The BBC reported that the organisers of the Commonwealth Games were concerned about the future of the event, after no member country had expressed serious interest in hosting the 2022 edition with only two months to go before the March 2014 deadline for applicant cities. The high cost of the 2014 Commonwealth Games in Glasgow, with reports of between £500 million and £1 billion, damage to the reputation of the competition following the 2010 Games and disputes between the Commonwealth Games Federation board and member states' sporting federations were all said to be factors in why no serious hosting intentions were being made. Cardiff, who were pursuing a bid for the 2026 games, said it would be "unlikely" for them to bring their bid forward to 2022. An emergency general meeting was held in Kuala Lumpur on 24 January to try and resolve these issues and ensure the future of the games.

On 31 January 2014 Gideon Sam, vice-president of the Commonwealth Games Federation, was quoted in The Namibian stating intentions of holding the 2022 games in Africa following meetings in Kuala Lumpur: "We decided that 2022 will be Africa’s time. Africa makes up a huge number of Commonwealth countries and we now appeal to African leaders to be brave, to club together and to come forward so that we can host the Commonwealth Games" "We cannot continue doing what we did in the past, when we voted with Asia, Oceania or the Americas and not for ourselves. The time has come to show the world that there are no lions roaming the streets or naked people walking around"
