= 2022 Commonwealth Games marketing =

A campaign began in 2017 when Birmingham won its bid to host the 2022 Commonwealth Games.

== Emblem ==
The official emblem was unveiled on 27 July 2019 in Centenary Square, Birmingham, by the Birmingham Organising Committee for the 2022 Commonwealth Games (BOCCG) as part of the Commonwealth Social Festival to commemorate Three Years To Go. The emblem is a jagged, triangular "B" shape formed by blue-yellow gradient lines representing the key venues of the Games in the West Midlands. It was designed by local agency RBL, based in Royal Leamington Spa. This insignia is also the first to use the Commonwealth Games Federation's (CGF) new branding, "Commonwealth Sport". Locals in the city and on social media have mostly reacted positively to it and some compared it to the emblem for the 2012 Summer Olympics.

== Sponsors ==
Longines, a Swiss watchmaker, agreed to be the official partner and timekeeper for the next three editions of the Games, beginning in Birmingham in 2022. The news was made on Commonwealth Day, 9 March 2020, when the CGF, in collaboration with Longines and BOCCG, unveiled the Games's countdown clock in Centenary Square.

On 23 September 2020, BOCCG announced the University of Birmingham as the games' second official partner. The university provided venues and accommodation for the athletes during the events. The agreement also confirmed the university as the official partner of the international leg of the Games's Queen's Baton Relay.

On 9 March 2022, E.ON was unveiled as the third partner.

Sponsors of the 2022 Commonwealth Games
Partners
- Chase UK
- E.ON UK
- Longines
- Reckitt (Dettol)
- Severn Trent
- University of Birmingham
Supporters
- Aggreko
- Aruba Networks
- Canon Inc.
- Gi Group Spa
- GL events
- Gowling WLG
- North
- PwC
Providers
- Airbnb
- Aston University
- Biffa
- Birmingham Metropolitan College
- Bridj
- Bruntwood
- Bullring & Grand Central
- The Coca-Cola Company (Coca-Cola Zero Sugar)
- CSM Live
- Domestic & General
- DRPG
- Eleiko
- EventsAIR
- FGH Security
- Fujitsu
- Incorporatewear
- Kuehne + Nagel
- Lendlease
- MTD
- Microplus
- National Grid plc
- Nivea
- NVT Group
- OCS
- PTI Digital
- RE:ACT
- RGS Events
- Riedel Communications
- Rosterfy
- Royal Mail
- SLX
- Smiths Detection
- Sports Technnology
- STING
- Sunset + Vine
- Suntory (Lucozade)
- University College Birmingham
- Wilson James
- Wiz-Team
- Yonex
