= Maung Zarni =

Burmese democracy activist

- မောင်ဇာနည်
- Born: Zarni; 1963 (age 62–63); Mandalay, Burma
- Education: University of Mandalay (BSc); University of California, Davis (MA); University of Wisconsin-Madison (PhD)
- Occupation: Human rights activist
- Spouse: Natalie Brinham
- Children: Nilah & Dewi
- Website: maungzarni.net

Maung Zarni (Burmese: မောင်ဇာနည်; born 1963) is a Burmese educator, academic, and human rights activist. He is noted for his opposition to the violence in Rakhine State and the Rohingya genocide. Zarni is a co-founder of several activist platforms, including the Free Burma Coalition (1995-2004), the Free Rohingya Coalition (2018-present), and Forces of Renewal Southeast Asia (2018). He is also a Fellow at the Documentation Center - Cambodia, specializing in genocide, and serves as an advisor to Genocide Watch.

== Early life and education ==
Zarni was born in 1963 into a Burmese Buddhist family in Mandalay, Burma. He migrated to the United States on the eve of Burma’s 1988 uprisings. He graduated with a BSc (Chemistry) from University of Mandalay in 1984, MA from University of California, Davis in 1991, and earned his PhD in Curriculum and Instruction from University of Wisconsin-Madison in 1998.

== Career ==
Zarni founded and led the Free Burma Coalition, the then pioneering Internet-based human rights movement and spearheaded a successful international boycott against Myanmar’s military dictatorship from 1995 to 2004. Zarni has held a series of academic positions, or research and leadership fellowships, including at the London School of Economics' Human Security Research Unit. He resigned from an academic post at the Universiti Brunei Darussalam in 2013, citing academic censorship.

Zarni is a member of the board of advisors of Genocide Watch and a non-resident fellow at Genocide Documentation Center in Sleuk Rith Institute, Cambodia.

In 2014, Zarni co-authored an academic paper, "The Slow Burning Genocide of Myanmar's Rohingyas", with Alice Cowley, an academic study that examines the plight of the Rohingya using the genocide framework. In 2015, he was awarded the "Cultivation of Harmony Award," by the Parliament of the World's Religions, an international interfaith dialogue.

Zarni served as a member of the Panel of Judges in the Permanent Peoples Tribunal on Sri Lanka's genocidal crimes against Eelam Tamil in 2013 and was the initiator of the Permanent Peoples Tribunal on Myanmar in 2017. He has held visiting and research fellowships at institutions including UCL Institute of Education, Oxford, Harvard, and the London School of Economics.

On 21 May 2021, in the aftermath of the 2021 Myanmar coup d'état, he was initially appointed as the director of the Department of Advisory Cooperation at the Ministry of International Cooperation of the NUG by Minister Sasa. However, the appointment was revoked just one hour after a statement was released, for reasons unknown.

In 2024, he was nominated for the Nobel Peace Prize by Northern Irish peace activist Mairead Corrigan Maguire, herself a recipient of the 1976 Nobel Peace Prize.

== Personal life ==
Zarni is married to Natalie Brinham, an English researcher, and has a daughter.

== Books ==
- Myanmar’s Enemy of the State speaks: Irreverent Essays and Interviews (2019)
- Essays on Myanmar's Genocide of Rohingyas (2011-18) (2018)
- The Free Burma Coalition Manual: How You Can Helpagn Burma's Struggle for Freedom (1997)
