= Brian Barwick =

English rugby league administrator

Brian Barwick OBE
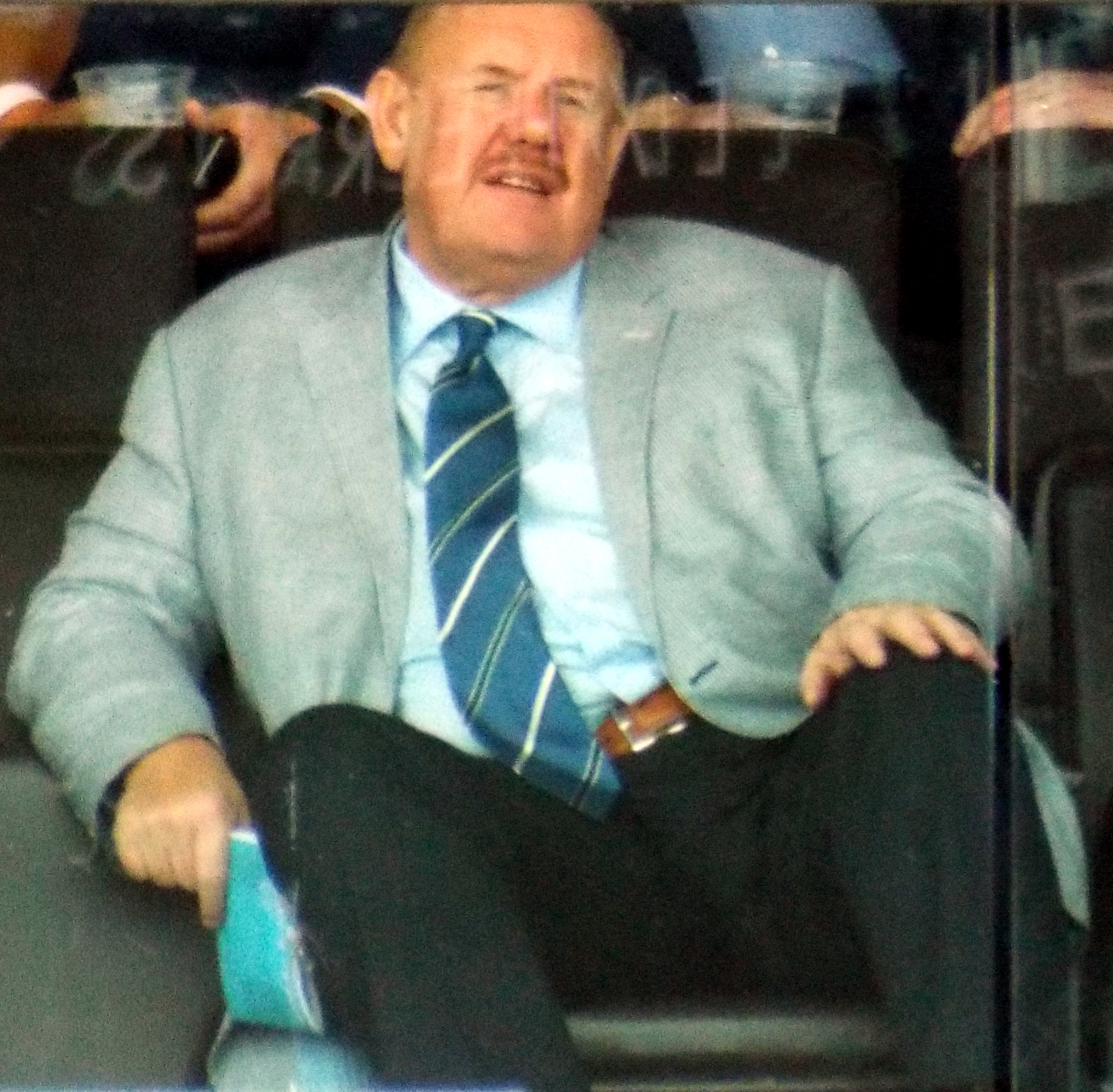
- Born: 21 June 1954 (age 72); England
- Education: Quarry Bank High School
- Alma mater: University of Liverpool
- Occupations: Former Chairman of the RFL & Super League Europe Ltd & National League (football).
- Known for: Chief Executive of the F.A., Head of BBC Sport; Controller of ITV Sport

Brian Robert Barwick OBE (born 21 June 1954) is an English rugby league administrator. He has enjoyed a long and distinguished career in major sports broadcasting and administration. He was awarded an OBE in the 2021 Queen's Birthday Honours List for services to sport and broadcasting.

Brian currently serves as the Chairman of Liverpool City Council's Sports Events Delivery Group, he formerly served as the President of the Rugby League World Cup 2021.

Brian has held a number of senior positions, including Chief Executive of The Football Association (2005–2008), Chairman of football's National League (2015–2021), Chairman of the Rugby Football League (RFL) and Super League Europe Ltd (2013–2019). He also served as an FA Council member from 2015 to 2021 and was appointed to the FA Fellowship in August 2021.

He is a Founding Fellow of the advisory board of Liverpool Hope University Business School, Chair of Trustees at Clatterbridge Cancer Charity and was a visiting professor in the management school of the University of Liverpool and chairman of the advisory board of the higher education establishment UCFB. He was recently awarded an honorary doctorate by Buckinghamshire New University

He is the former head of BBC Sport and editor of Match of the Day, and Controller of ITV Sport. He is a regular columnist in the Liverpool Echo and writes on sports broadcasting for the national media and has had three books on football and broadcast published.

== Education ==
Barwick was educated at Quarry Bank High School and then gained a degree in economics at Liverpool University.

== Career ==
=== BBC ===
He later worked as a journalist for the North West Evening Mail, based in Barrow-in-Furness, before joining the BBC's sports department in 1979. He was a producer of Football Focus (1982–1984) and editor of Match of the Day (1988–1995). He was senior editor of the BBC's coverage of the 1990 and 1994 World Cups.

Aside from football, Barwick was also the senior editor for the BBC's broadcasting of several other sporting events including the Barcelona and Atlanta Olympic Games, the Commonwealth Games and the European and World Athletics Championships. He was also the editor of Sports Review of the Year (1991–1995). In 1995, he became BBC's Head of Sport (Production).

=== ITV ===
In February 1998, Barwick moved to ITV and became controller of sport. At ITV he was responsible for several high-profile sporting events such as the 1998 World Cup, which saw the channel's highest ever audience of 23.8m viewers for the match between England and Argentina, and the 2002 World Cup, and the 2000 and 2004 European Championships. He also negotiated rights for the 2003 Rugby World Cup, which was won by England.

Barwick also negotiated rights for ITV to televise sporting events, including: Formula One, The Boat Race, the Super Bowl and the Tour de France, and won the Premier League highlights rights from the BBC from 2001 to 2004. He was also responsible for launching ITV2 and bringing Desmond Lynam and Gabby Logan to ITV.

=== The FA ===
In November 2004, Barwick was named as the chief executive of the Football Association and began the role in January 2005. He had worked with the FA before joining as the chief executive, negotiating a number of TV rights deals for both the BBC and ITV. Barwick worked with three England managers during his time at the FA – Sven Goran Eriksson, Steve McClaren and Fabio Capello.

Barwick also oversaw the completion of the new Wembley Stadium and launched the FA's Respect Campaign. He stepped down from his role in August 2008 and left the organisation at the end of that year.

=== Rugby League ===
After launching his own sport and media consultancy, Barwick was approached to become the new Chairman of the Rugby Football League in January 2013, a position he held until April 2019. He also took up the post as chairman of the sport's Super League Europe and was Chairman of the RFL's 2021 Rugby League World Cup bid. He is currently the President of the 2021 Rugby League World Cup.

=== The National League ===
Barwick served as the Chairman of football's National League (formerly the Football Conference) from June 2015 to June 2021 and was also a member of the FA Council.

=== Other appointments ===
Barwick was appointed Chairman of the City of Liverpool's 2022 Commonwealth Games Bid in April 2017. Barwick was visiting professor of strategic leadership at the Management School of the University of Liverpool between January 2009 and June 2017. He has also been chairman of the advisory board of UCFB – a higher-education establishment working in football business industries. He was made an honorary doctorate by Buckinghamshire New University in September 2015 in recognition of his career in broadcasting and sport, and in August 2017 was made a member of the Liverpool Hope University's Business School's advisory board.

Barwick was appointed Officer of the Order of the British Empire (OBE) in the 2021 New Year Honours for services to sport and sports broadcasting.

=== Writing ===
He has had three books published – The Great Derbies - Everton v Liverpool (with Gerald Sinstadt), an autobiography, Anfield Days and Wembley Ways and Are You Watching the Match Tonight, a history of football on television and Sixty Years a Red... and Counting (October 2021). He also writes regularly in local and national media on sports broadcasting and life in general.

His interests include British comedy, swimming and popular music.

Media offices
Preceded by Unknown	ITV Controller of Sport; 1998–2005	Succeeded by Mark Sharman
