= Mark Sharman =

British broadcasting executive (born 1950)

Mark Brian Sharman (born 2 January 1950) is a British broadcasting executive.

== Early life ==
He attended the John Port Grammar School in Etwall.

== Career ==
Sharman first worked as a journalist with the Derby Evening Telegraph and Birmingham Evening Mail before entering television journalism with ITV in 1976, where he edited coverage of Football World Cups and the Olympic Games. He later worked for BSkyB as deputy managing director of Sky Sports, helping to expand from one channel to four and creating Sky Sports News, before joining Channel 4 as controller of sport in 1998, where he wrested broadcasting rights for test cricket from the BBC. A year later he returned to BSkyB and became director of broadcasting, with responsibility for Sky One, Sky News and Sky Movies channels.

After a fourteen-month sabbatical, he re-joined ITV as controller of sport in early 2005. Two years later Sharman was appointed as director of ITV's network and regional news, replacing the retiring Clive Jones, retaining his controller of sport role. He secured a notable coup in March 2007, when ITV, in a joint bid with Setanta Sports, successfully gained broadcasting rights for FA Cup matches and England national football team home games starting from August 2008. The BBC and Sky had previously held the rights since 2001. He stepped down from his position at the end of 2008.

Media offices
Preceded by Brian Barwick	ITV Controller of Sport; 2005 – 2008	Succeeded by Niall Sloane
