= Tomasz Misiak =

Polish businessman and politician

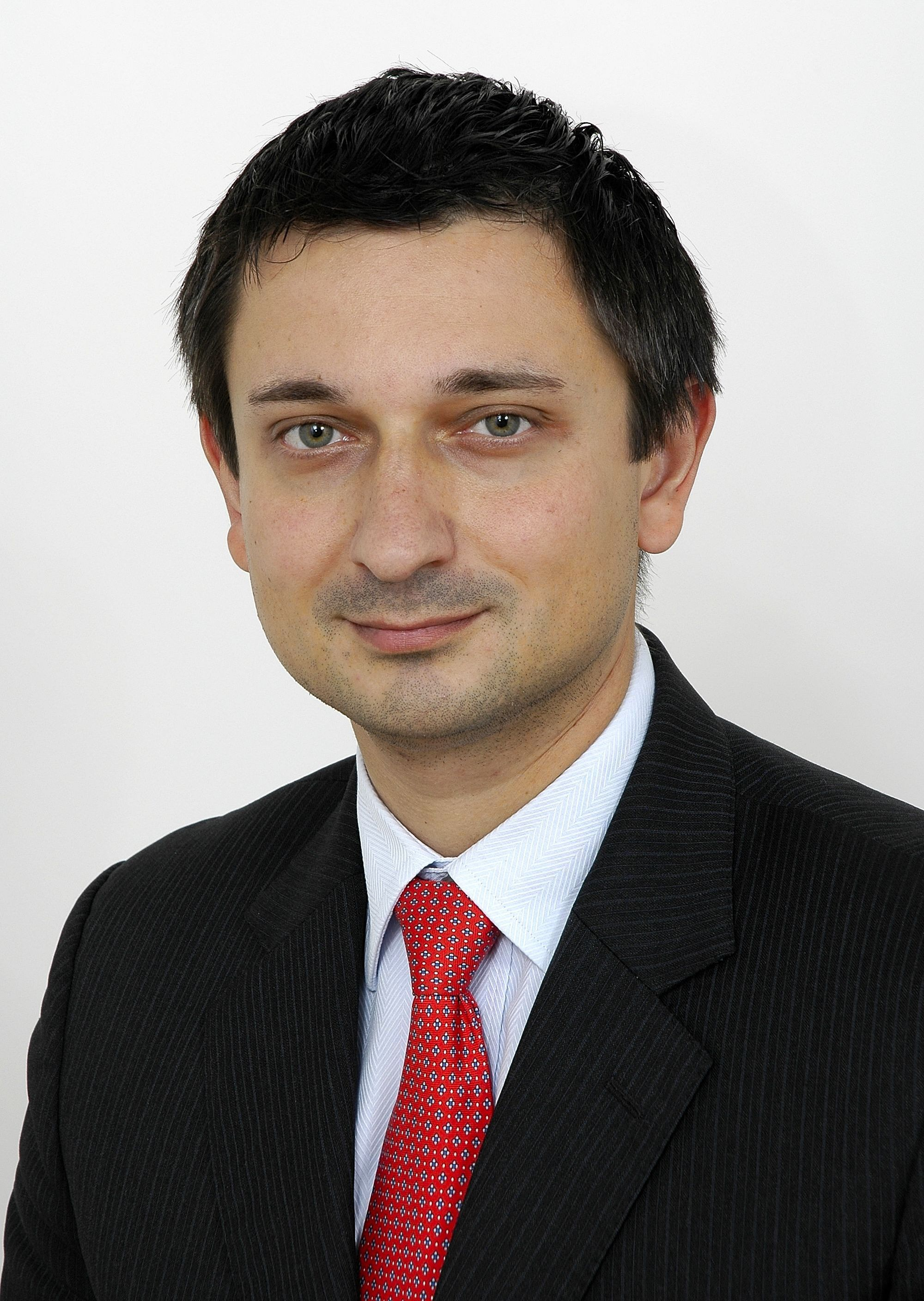
- Misiak in 2007

Member of the Senate of Poland
- In office 2005–2011

Personal details
- Born: 7 July 1973 (age 53) Wrocław, Poland
- Party: Civic Platform (until 2009)

Tomasz Wojciech Misiak (born 7 July 1973 in Wrocław) is a Polish politician and businessman. He co-founded Work Service, the biggest Polish employment agency and served as a senator, representing Civic Platform.

== Early life and education ==
Tomasz Misiak was born in Wrocław, Poland, in 1973 and graduated from the Wrocław University of Economics in 2000, as well as postgraduate studies in management (IESE Business School, Global Leadership Seminar at Georgetown University, and Global CEO Program).

In 1995, a political organization at the Wrocław University of Economics where Misiak was active had grown almost tenfold with fictitious members.

== Biography ==
Misiak co-founded Work Service, a temporary employment agency in Poland, and served as its vice president from 1999 to 2007.

Since 2011 he has been an owner and manager of HMS Investment Fund LTD. In 2012 he has been elected as a vice president of the biggest Polish employers organisation Pracodawcy RP. In 2013 he was also appointed as a member of BIAC and member of New Leader of Tomorrow in Crans Montana Forum organisation.

On October 8, 2019, the Extraordinary General Meeting of Shareholders dismissed Misiak from the Supervisory Board of Work Service.

== Political career ==
Misiak entered politics as a member of the Union of Freedom and later joined the Civic Platform party. He was elected to the Wrocław City Council in 1998 and served as chairman of the Economic Initiatives Committee.

In 2000, as a Wrocław councilor, he co-directed the Euro Art Meeting association, which organized an event to celebrate the millennium. It turned out that the event cost nearly 4 million Polish złoty, and the organizers were unable to account for 250,000 zł before the Supreme Audit Office.

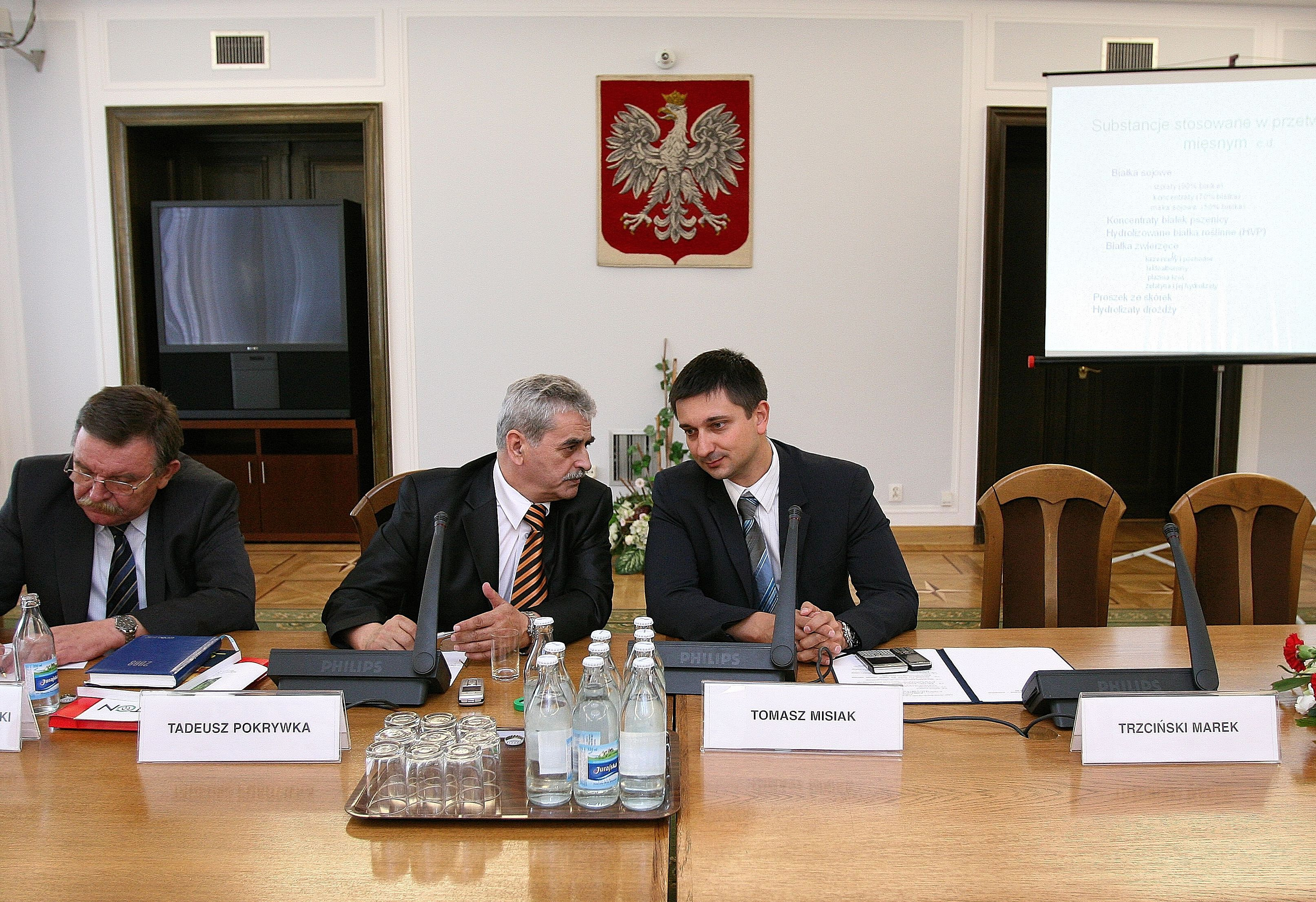
Misiak and Tadeusz Pokrywka in the Polish Senate in 2008

In 2005, he was elected to the Senate of Poland and was re-elected in 2007. As a senator, Misiak chaired the Senate Committee on Economy and also engaged in activities of European Union Committee.

In November 2008, Rzeczpospolita revealed that Misiak had lobbied for the enactment of regulations concerning commodity vouchers for employees, with a market worth 2 billion zł at stake (equivalent to 2.64 billion zł in 2021). The issue concerned the possibility of selling vouchers below their nominal value, which would consolidate the hypermarket monopoly.

In 2011, Misiak ran for re-election to the Senate but was unsuccessful. He ran from the election committee of the Union of Presidents - Citizens for the Senate but did not win a seat again.

=== Removal from Civic Platform ===
On 17 March 2009, Polish Prime Minister Donald Tusk removed Misiak from the Civic Platform party due to a scandal involving his company Work Service receiving a contract from the Polish government for job training and placement services for laid-off shipyard workers. He was accused of a conflict of interest since he was the chairman of the Senate Committee on Economy, which had worked on the legislation regarding liquidation of shipyards in Gdańsk and Szczecin which made the contract possible. Later, the Industrial Development Agency and his company terminated the agreement regarding services for shipyard workers.

Misiak was removed from his position as chairman of the Senate Committee on Economy and left Civic Platform. He also lost his position as the head of the party's campaign for the European Parliament.

== Legal cases ==
In December 2022, Misiak faced legal trouble as the Warsaw Court of Appeals upheld the decision by the International Court of Arbitration concerning the sale of Work Service S.A. shares. Misiak was found to owe nearly 6 million zł to the Italian company Gi Group Spa. He claimed he was forced to sell his shares and refused to execute the agreement. However, the court did not find these claims to be true. Gi Group obtained a favorable verdict, and Misiak was ordered to pay 5.9 million zł. Misiak's appeal was dismissed, and he was charged with full court costs of 200,000 zł.

Gi Group publicly announced that they had not yet received the compensation awarded from Misiak, as he declared that he had no assets or properties.

=== Detention and criminal charges ===
In October 2022, Misiak was one of four people detained by the Central Anticorruption Bureau and the Central Investigation Bureau of Police in a large-scale operation related to a multi-year investigation into fraud and extortion of over 32 million zł from the State Fund for Rehabilitation of Disabled Persons (PFRON) and the Social Insurance Institution (ZUS) between 2010 and 2019. Misiak was charged with managing a criminal group, money laundering, defrauding public funds, large-scale fraud, committing crimes against workers' rights, and making false statements in documents. Around 22,000 workers were victimized in the case.

On 14 November 2022, the court found a high probability of the accused committing the alleged acts and applied a series of preventive measures against Misiak, including passport confiscation, property guarantee, police supervision, and a ban on leaving the country.

In February 2024, Misiak's case was included (along with the cases of 10 other entrepreneurs and former managers) in an appeal by non-governmental organizations and public figures, the signatories of which called on Public Prosecutor General Adam Bodnar to "review politically motivated prosecutorial proceedings in 2015–2023 and rehabilitate the victims." In response to the appeal, the public prosecutor general published an open letter in which he declared the establishment of special teams of prosecutors to review and analyze specific cases.

On 30 September 2024, members of the Parliamentary Assembly of the Council of Europe (PACE) from 16 CoE Member States issued a written declaration urging the Polish government to conduct a full and transparent audit of politically motivated criminal cases from 2015–2023, listing Misiak’s case among other high-profile cases of allegedly persecuted entrepreneurs.
