= Edmonton bid for the 2022 Commonwealth Games =

- Logo of Edmonton's 2022 Commonwealth Games bid
- Host city: Edmonton, Alberta, Canada
- Main venue: Commonwealth Stadium
- Website: http://www.edmonton2022.com/

The Edmonton bid for the 2022 Commonwealth Games was an attempt to bring the 2022 Commonwealth Games to the city of Edmonton, Alberta, Canada. On 10 February 2015, Edmonton withdrew its bid for the Games.

== Background ==
On March 31, 2014, The City of Edmonton announced its intent to bid for 2022 Commonwealth Games. On July 1, 2014, The City of Edmonton, in partnership with the Government of Alberta and Commonwealth Games Canada, named former Edmonton Airports President and CEO Reg Milley as the Chair of the Bid Committee for the 2022 Commonwealth Games. The logo for the Edmonton bid was also unveiled during the Canada Day celebrations at City Hall.

Edmonton is Canada's fifth-largest city and the second-largest city in as well as the capital of the province of Alberta. It is home to a number of professional sports associations (most notably the Edmonton Eskimos (Canadian) football team and Edmonton Oilers ice hockey team, winners of five Stanley Cups). The 1978 Commonwealth Games, the 1983 Summer Universiade and the 2001 World Championships in Athletics were all held in Edmonton, and the city has also hosted some matches of the 2006 Women's Rugby World Cup, the 2007 FIFA U-20 World Cup, the 2014 FIFA U-20 Women's World Cup and the 2015 FIFA Women's World Cup.

The committee planned to renovate the Commonwealth Stadium for the games and build a new velodrome to replace the aging Argyll Velodrome. The Northlands Coliseum and Rogers Place were also part of the bid.

On February 11, 2015, Edmonton announced it was withdrawing its bid to host the 2022 Commonwealth Games, citing financial reasons and a global fall in oil prices. The bid team will instead focus on the 2026 event.

== See also ==
- 1978 Commonwealth Games at Edmonton
