= Victoria bid for the 2022 Commonwealth Games =

- Host city: Victoria, British Columbia, Canada
- Motto: Back to the Future
- Website: www.2022victoria.com

The Victoria bid for the 2022 Commonwealth Games is a cancelled bid by Victoria, British Columbia, Canada and Commonwealth Games Canada to host the 2022 Commonwealth Games. On 24 August 2017 Victoria withdrew its bid to host the 2022 Commonwealth Games, leaving only Birmingham and Liverpool in the race.

== Background ==
On 30 June 2017, Victoria officially announced its bid to host the games. Bid committee chair David Black announced the bid was submitted with letters of support from the provincial government, local municipalities and the University of Victoria. Lisa Helps, the mayor of Victoria, revealed on 30 April 2017 that the City of Victoria was exploring a possible bid for the 2022 Commonwealth Games. Victoria last hosted the 1994 Commonwealth Games. Vancouver, which is also in British Columbia, hosted the 1954 Commonwealth Games and 2010 Winter Olympic Games and Paralympic Games.

On 24 August 2017 B.C. Finance Minister Carole James announced in a statement that the province would not contribute funding to a 2022 Commonwealth Games bid due to too many uncertainties. She cited question marks surrounding the bid, including revenue commitments, venue locations, cost of security – which weren’t included in the bid committee’s cost estimate – and any added costs like transit, infrastructure and health services for athletes. The government agreed, with James saying they were dealing with too many other crises including one of B.C’s worst wildfire seasons in history. James suggested to bid for the 2030 Commonwealth Games.

== Cost ==
The total cost of the Victoria 2022 Commonwealth Games was anticipated to be in the region of $955 million with $400 million expected to come from the Government of Canada, $400 million from the province, $25 million from local municipalities and $130 million from sponsorship deals to pay for the Games.

== Venues ==
Following were the venues proposed for the games:

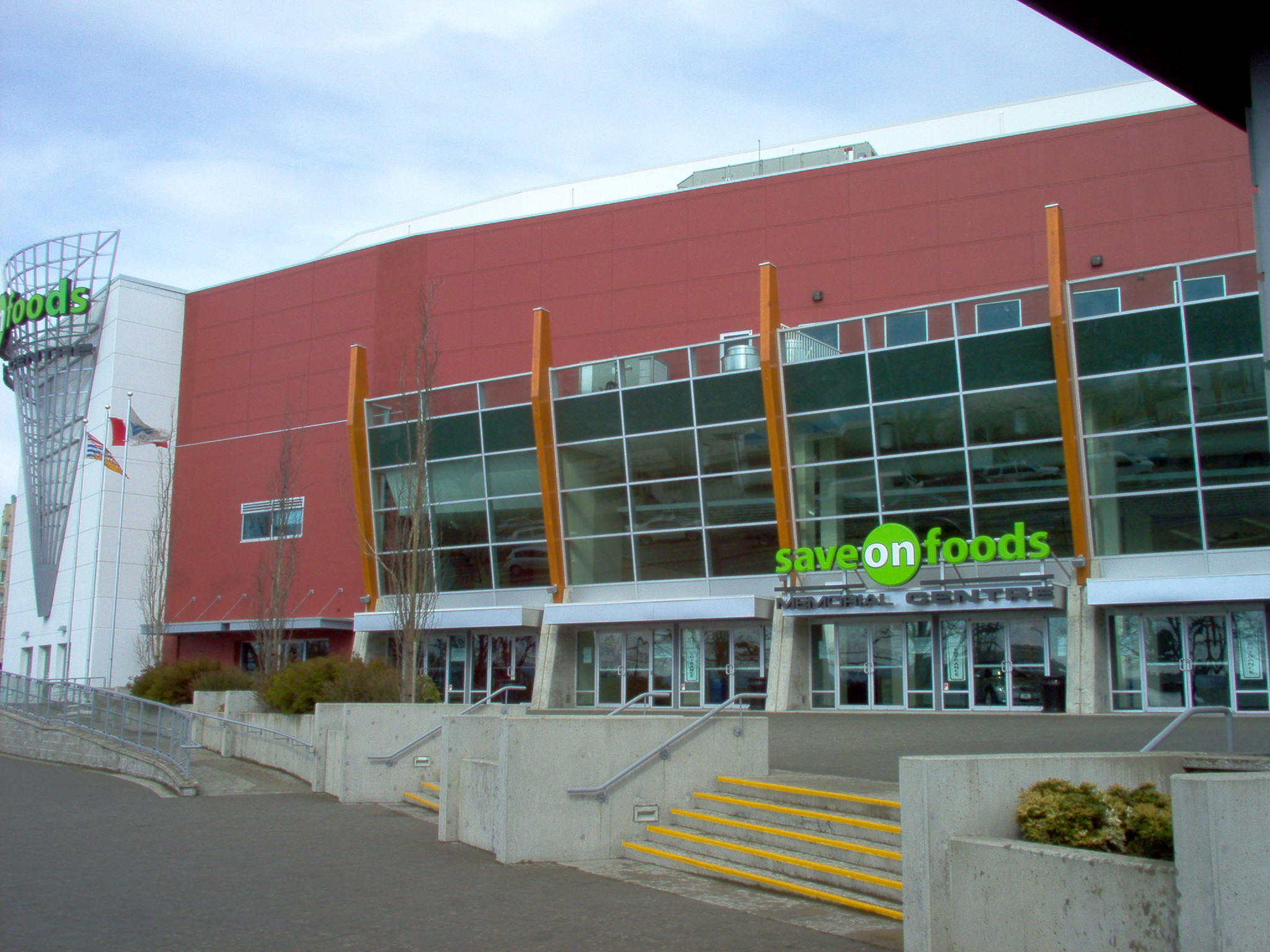
Save-on-Foods Memorial Centre

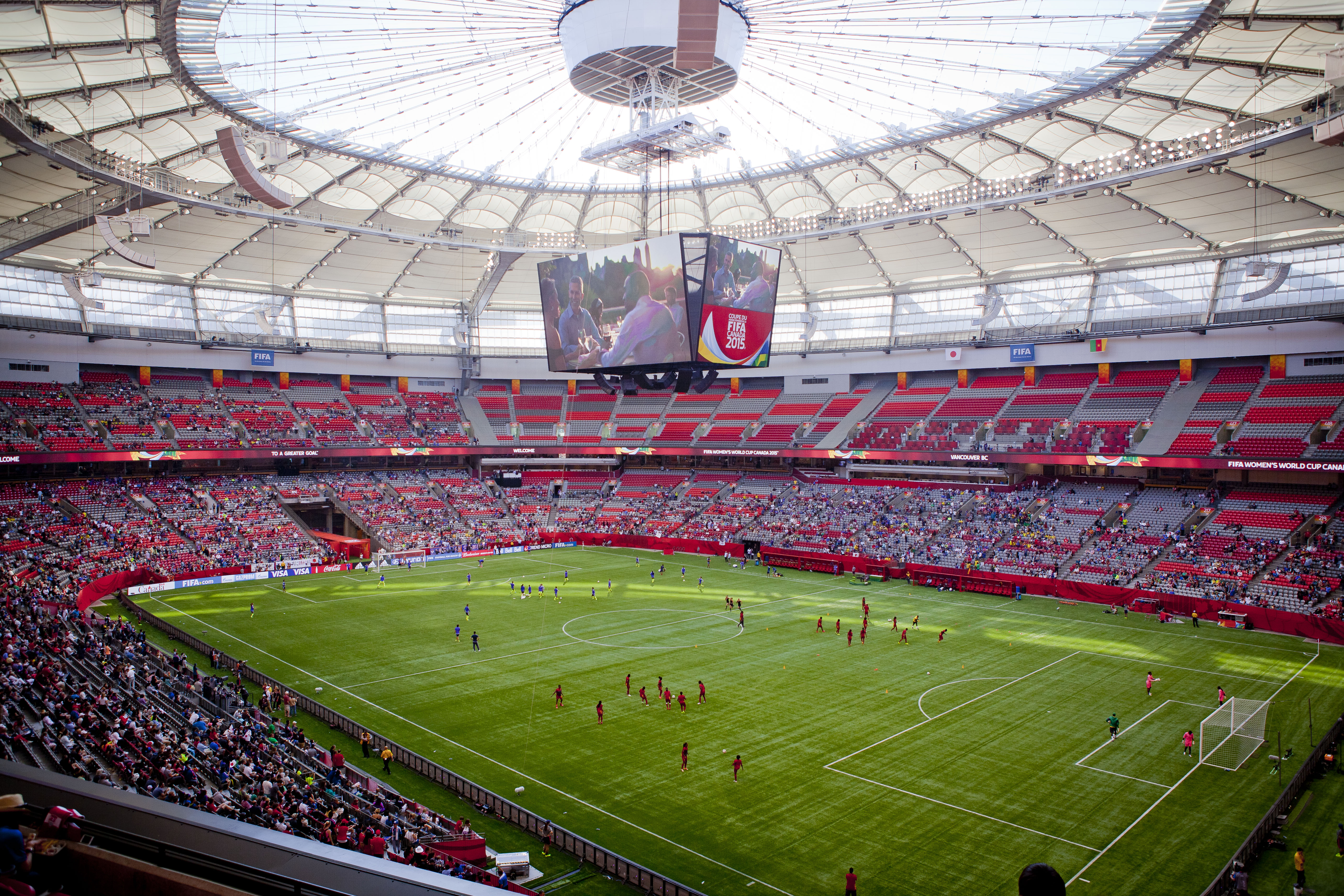
BC Place at Vancouver, British Columbia

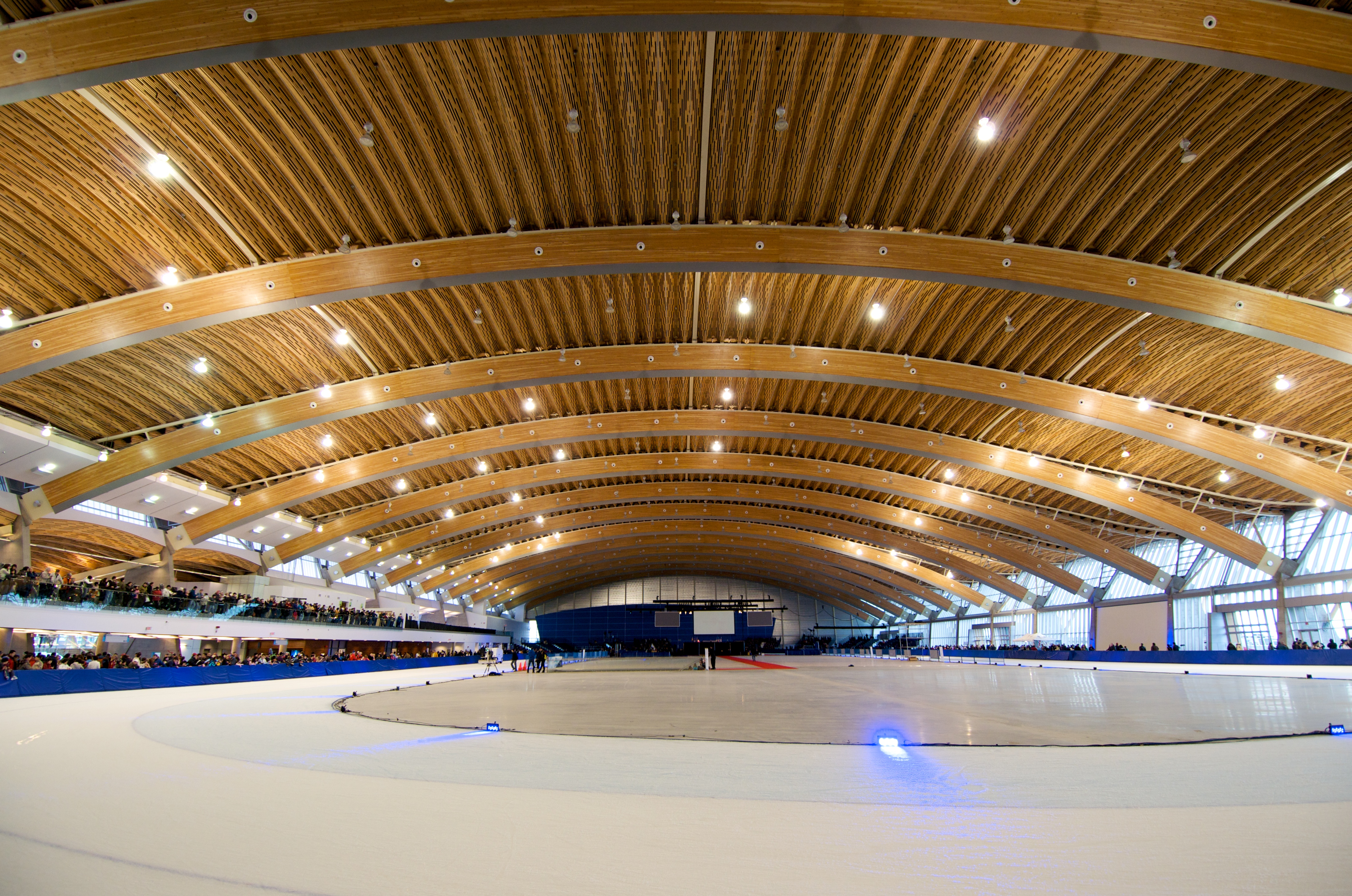
Richmond Oval at Richmond, British Columbia

=== Venues in Victoria ===
Venue	Sport	Status
Regional Stadium in the West Shore	Ceremonies Athletics	New
Gymnastics Arena	Gymnastics	New
Beach Volleyball Court	Beach Volleyball	Temporary
Saanich Commonwealth Place	Swimming	Existing
Save-On-Foods Memorial Centre	Boxing	Existing
Q Centre	Judo Wrestling	Existing
University of Victoria’s CARSA Gym	Netball	Existing
University of Victoria	Field Hockey	Existing
Bear Mountain	Mountain biking	Existing
Elk Lake	Triathlon	Existing
Juan de Fuca	Lawn bowling	Existing

=== Venues outside Victoria ===
Venue	Sport	Status
B.C. Place	Rugby sevens	Existing
Richmond Oval	Badminton Table Tennis	Existing

== See also ==
Commonwealth Games celebrated in Canada

- 1930 Commonwealth Games at Hamilton
- 1954 Commonwealth Games at Vancouver
- 1978 Commonwealth Games at Edmonton
- 1994 Commonwealth Games at Victoria
