= José Manuel Barroso =

Portuguese politician (born 1956)

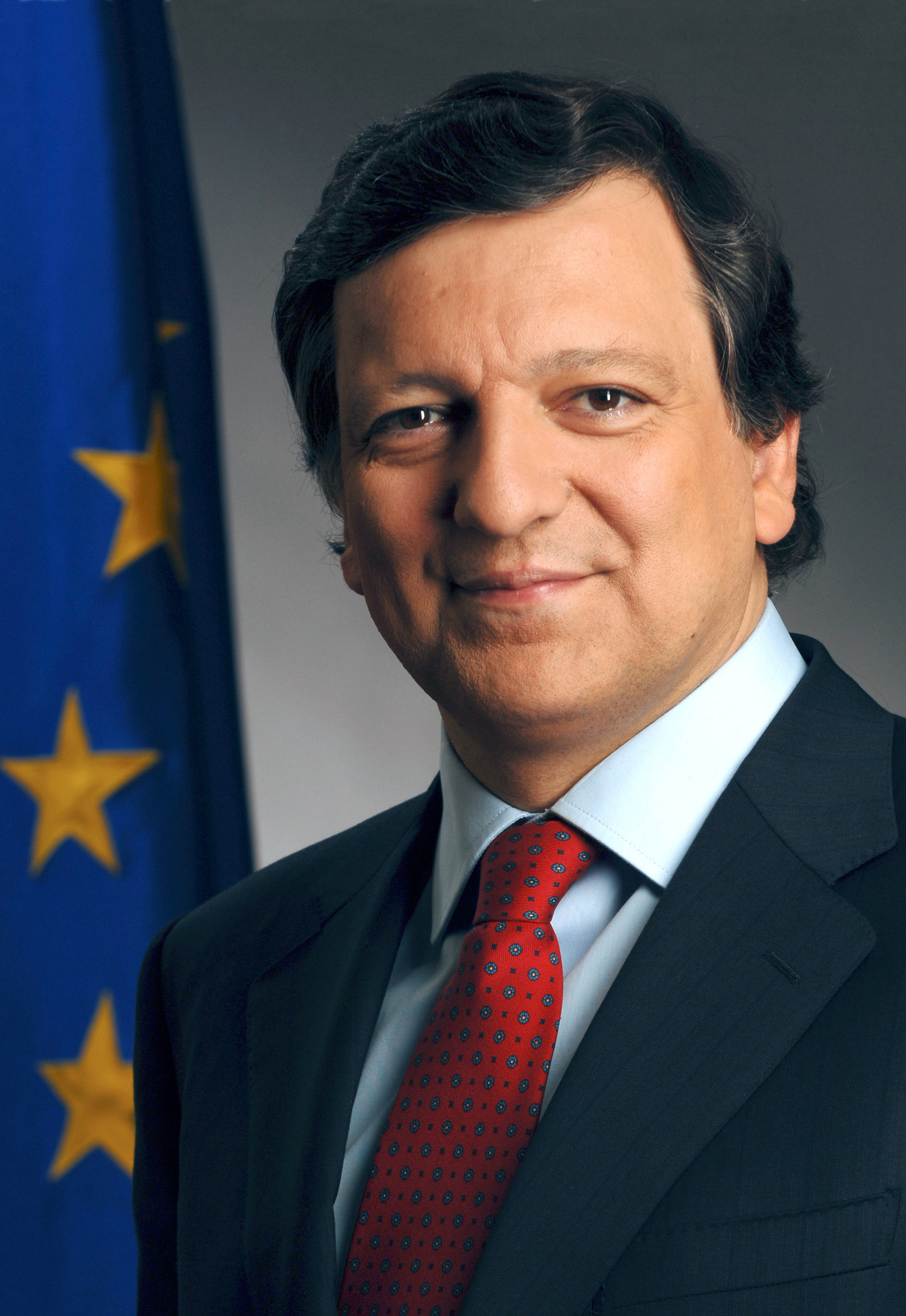
- Official portrait, 2005

President of the European Commission
- In office 22 November 2004 – 31 October 2014
- First Vice-President: Margot Wallström; Catherine Ashton
- Preceded by: Romano Prodi
- Succeeded by: Jean-Claude Juncker

Prime Minister of Portugal
- In office 6 April 2002 – 17 July 2004
- President: Jorge Sampaio
- Preceded by: António Guterres
- Succeeded by: Pedro Santana Lopes

President of the Social Democratic Party
- In office 2 May 1999 – 30 June 2004
- Secretary-General: José Luís Arnaut
- Preceded by: Marcelo Rebelo de Sousa
- Succeeded by: Pedro Santana Lopes

Leader of the Opposition
- In office 2 May 1999 – 6 April 2002
- Prime Minister: António Guterres
- Preceded by: Marcelo Rebelo de Sousa
- Succeeded by: Eduardo Ferro Rodrigues

Minister of Foreign Affairs
- In office 13 November 1992 – 28 October 1995
- Prime Minister: Aníbal Cavaco Silva
- Preceded by: João de Deus Pinheiro
- Succeeded by: Jaime Gama

Secretary of State for Foreign Affairs and Cooperation
- In office 18 August 1987 – 12 November 1992
- Prime Minister: Aníbal Cavaco Silva
- Preceded by: Eduardo Azevedo Soares
- Succeeded by: José Briosa e Gala

Secretary of State Assistant to the Minister of Internal Administration
- In office 8 November 1985 – 17 August 1987
- Prime Minister: Aníbal Cavaco Silva
- Preceded by: Carlos Encarnação
- Succeeded by: José Branquinho Lobo

Member of the Assembly of the Republic
- In office 27 October 1995 – 22 November 2004
- Constituency: Lisbon
- In office 13 November 1992 – 26 October 1995
- Constituency: Viseu
- In office 13 August 1987 – 18 August 1987
- Constituency: Viseu
- In office 4 November 1985 – 8 November 1985
- Constituency: Lisbon

Personal details
- Born: José Manuel Durão Barroso; 23 March 1956 (age 70) Lisbon, Portugal
- Party: Workers' Communist Party (1974–1977); Social Democratic Party (1980–present)
- Spouses: Maria Uva (m. 1980; died 2016); Joana Gonçalves (m. 2023)
- Children: 3
- Education: University of Lisbon; University of Geneva; Georgetown University
- José Manuel Barroso's voice Barroso on the 2008 financial crisis Recorded 6 October 2008

José Manuel Durão Barroso (Note: European Portuguese pronunciation: [ʒuˈzɛ mɐˈnwɛl duˈɾɐ̃w bɐˈʁozu]) (born 23 March 1956) is a Portuguese politician and law professor. He served as the prime minister of Portugal from 2002 to 2004 and as the president of the European Commission from 2004 to 2014.

He has been one of the revolving door cases at the EU, which received the most media attention because only two months after the cooling off period, Barroso accepted a position as "senior adviser" and "non-executive chairman" of Goldman Sachs International and became subject of an ethics inquiry.

== Early life and education ==
José Barroso was born in Lisbon to Luís António Saraiva Barroso and his wife Maria Elisabete de Freitas Durão.

Durão Barroso (as he is known in Portugal) graduated from the Faculty of Law of the University of Lisbon. He subsequently obtained a Diploma in European Studies from the European University Institute, and received a master's with honours in political science from the University of Geneva in Switzerland.

Barroso became politically active in his late teens, during the Estado Novo regime in Portugal, before the Carnation Revolution of 25 April 1974. In his university days, he was one of the leaders of the underground Maoist MRPP (Re-Organized Movement of the Proletariat Party, later Portuguese Workers' Communist Party (PCTP/MRPP), Communist Party of the Portuguese Workers/Revolutionary Movement of the Portuguese Proletariat). In an interview with the newspaper Expresso, he said that he had joined MRPP to fight the only other student body movement, also underground, which was controlled by the Portuguese Communist Party. Despite this justification, there is a very famous political 1976 interview recorded by the Portuguese state-run television channel, RTP, in which Barroso, as a politically minded student during the post-Carnation Revolution turmoil known as PREC, criticises the bourgeois education system which "throws students against workers and workers against students." Barosso was also one of the founders of the Portuguese University Association for European Studies (AUROP) in 1979. His political career formally began when he joined the Social Democratic Party (PSD) in 1980, which marked his shift from academic to national politics. He was appointed to his first government role in 1985.

== Career ==
His academic career began as an assistant professor in the Faculty of Law of the University of Lisbon. Barroso did PhD research at Georgetown University and Georgetown's Edmund A. Walsh School of Foreign Service in Washington, D.C., but his CV does not list any doctoral degree (except honorary). Back in Lisbon, Barroso became director of the Department for International Relations at Lusíada University (Universidade Lusíada).

In December 1980, Barroso joined the right-of-centre PPD (Democratic Popular Party, later PPD/PSD-Social Democratic Party), where he remains to the present day.

In 1985, under the PSD government of Aníbal Cavaco Silva, prime minister of Portugal, Barroso was named Under-Secretary of State in the Ministry of Home Affairs. In 1987 he became a member of the same government as he was elevated to Secretary of State for Foreign Affairs and Cooperation (answering to the Minister of Foreign Affairs), a post he was to hold for the next five years. In this capacity, he was the driving force behind the Bicesse Accords of 1990, which led to a temporary armistice in the Angolan Civil War between the ruling MPLA and the opposition UNITA. He also supported independence for East Timor, a former Portuguese colony, then a province of Indonesia by force. In 1992, Barroso was promoted to the post of Minister of Foreign Affairs, and served in this capacity until the defeat of the PSD in the 1995 general election.

=== Prime minister of Portugal, 2002–2004 ===
In 1995, while in opposition, Barroso was elected to the Assembly of the Republic as a representative for Lisbon. He became chairman of the Foreign Affairs Committee. In 1998 he graduated from the Georgetown Leadership Seminar. In 1999 he was elected president of the PSD, succeeding Marcelo Rebelo de Sousa (a professor of law), and thus became Leader of the Opposition. Parliamentary elections in 2002 gave the PSD enough seats to form a coalition government with the right-wing Portuguese People's Party, and Barroso subsequently became Prime Minister of Portugal on 6 April 2002.

As prime minister, facing a growing budget deficit, he made a number of difficult decisions and adopted strict reforms. He vowed to reduce public expenditure, which made him unpopular among leftists and public servants. His purpose was to lower the public budget deficit to a 3% target (according to the demands of EU rules), and official data during the 2002–2004 period stated that the target was being attained.

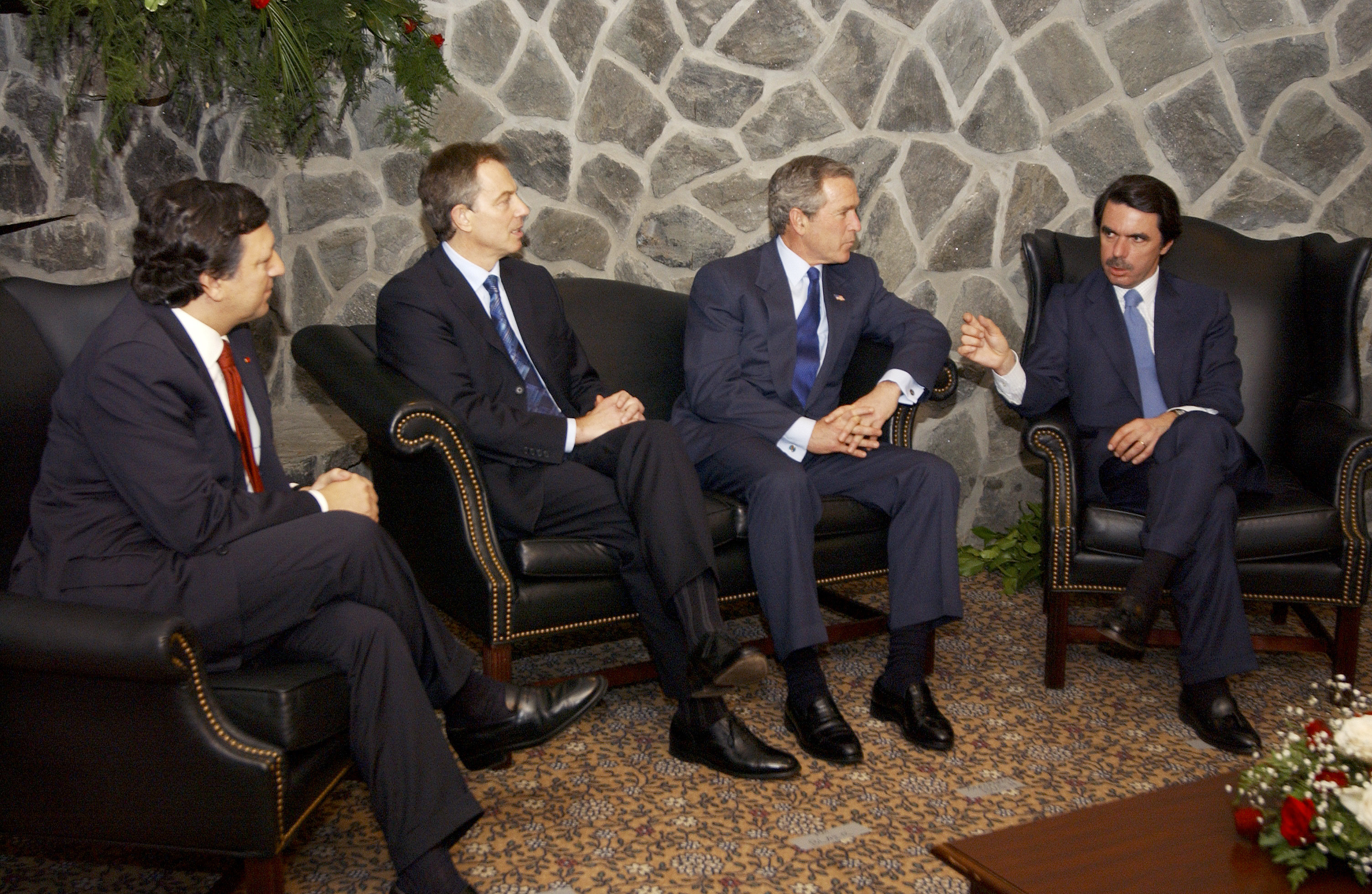
Barroso (far left) in the Azores in March 2003

In March 2003, Barroso hosted U.S President George W. Bush, British Prime Minister Tony Blair, and Spanish Prime Minister José María Aznar in the Portuguese island of Terceira, in the Azores. The four leaders finalised the controversial US-led 2003 invasion of Iraq. Under Barroso's leadership, Portugal became part of the "coalition of the willing" for the invasion and occupation of Iraq, sending non-combat troops. On 30 January 2003, Barroso signed The letter of the eight supporting US. policy on Iraq.

Barroso did not finish his term as he had been nominated as president of the European Commission on 5 July 2004. Barroso arranged with Portuguese President Jorge Sampaio to nominate Pedro Santana Lopes as a substitute prime minister of Portugal. Santana Lopes led the PSD/PP coalition for a few months until early 2005, when new elections were called. When the Portuguese Socialist Party won the elections it produced an estimation that by the end of the year the budget deficit would reach 6.1%, which it used to criticise Barroso's and Santana Lopes's economic policies.

=== President of the European Commission, 2004–2014 ===
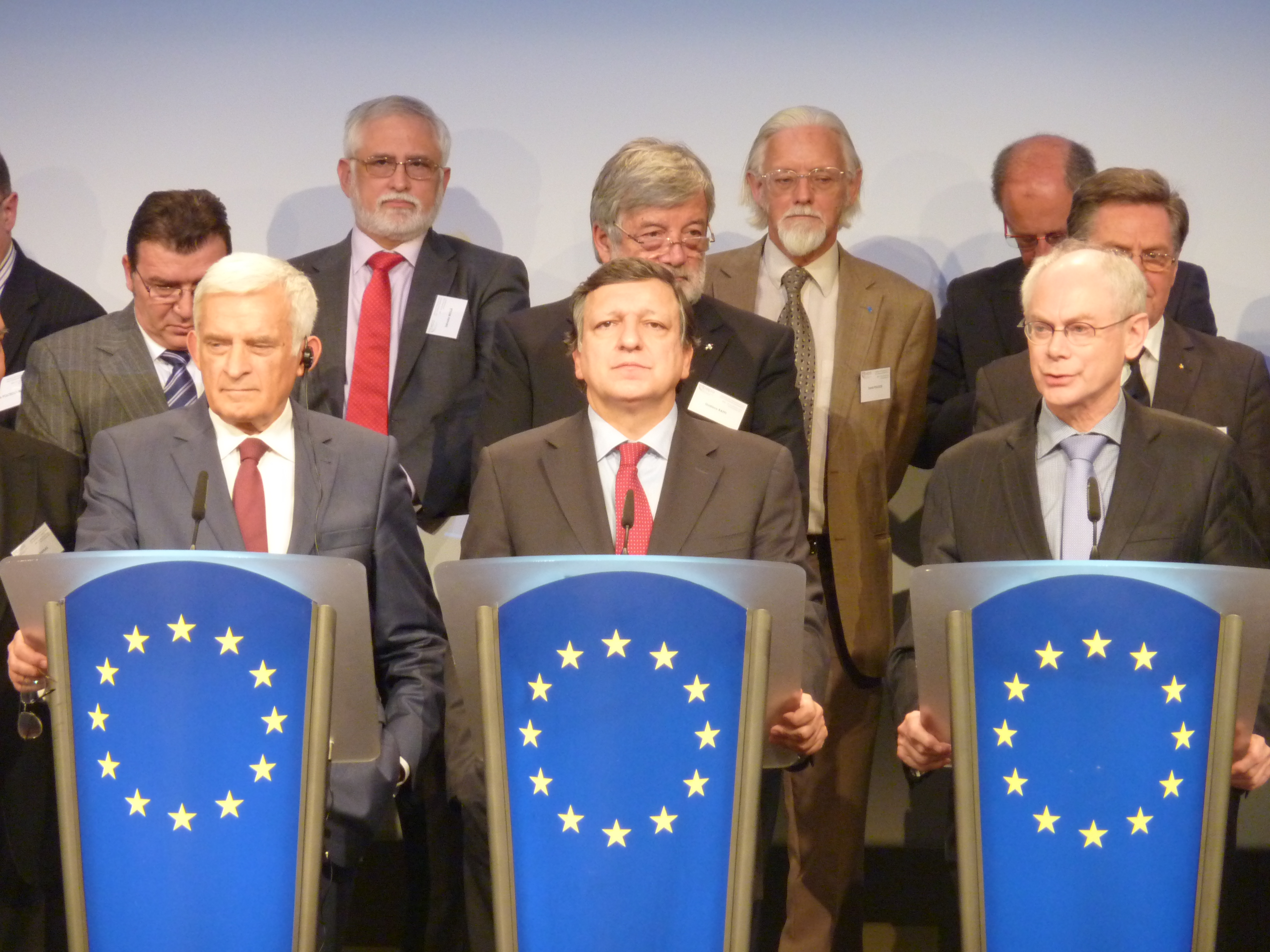
The "three European presidents", Jerzy Buzek (Parliament), José Manuel Barroso (Commission) and Herman Van Rompuy (European Council) during a press conference in 2011

In 2004, the proposed European Constitution and now the Treaty of Lisbon included a provision that the choice of the president must take into account the result of Parliamentary elections and the candidate supported by the victorious European political party in particular. That provision was not in force in the nomination in 2004, but the centre-right European People's Party (EPP), who won the elections, pressured for a candidate from its own ranks. In the end, Barroso, as EPP candidate, was chosen by the European Council. During his first presidency, the following issues were on the Commission's agenda: Turkey applying for EU membership, the reform of the institutions (Treaty of Lisbon), the Bolkestein directive, aimed at creating a single market for services within the EU, Lisbon Strategy, Galileo positioning system, Doha Development Agenda negotiations, European Institute of Innovation and Technology and an EU climate change package.

The EPP again endorsed Barroso for a second term during the 2009 European election campaign and, after the EPP again won the elections, was able to secure his nomination by the European Council on 17 June 2009. On 3 September 2009, Barroso unveiled his manifesto for his second term. On 16 September 2009, Barroso was re-elected by the European Parliament for another five years. Since he completed his second term he became only the second Commission president to serve two terms, after Jacques Delors. That Commission's term of office ran until 31 October 2014.

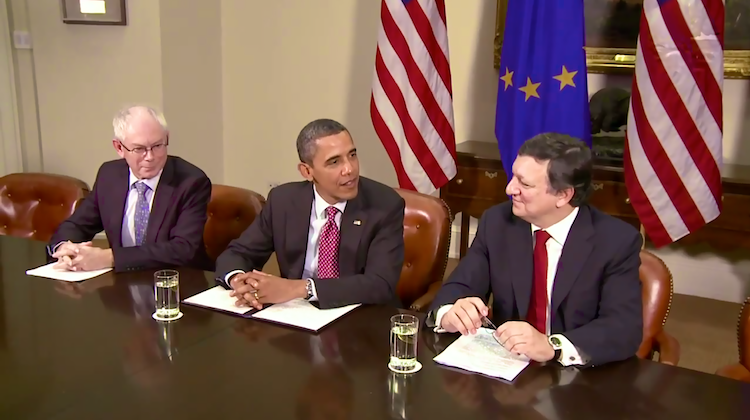
Barroso with President of the European Council Herman Van Rompuy and U.S. President Barack Obama in Washington, D.C., November 2011

Barroso visited Ireland to persuade Irish citizens to approve the Treaty of Lisbon in the country's second referendum due to be held the following month. Barroso was greeted by Irish Minister for Defence Willie O'Dea and Peter Power, the Minister of State for Overseas Development, as he got off his plane at Shannon Airport on the morning of 19 September 2009 before briefly meeting with the joint committee of the Oireachtas and meeting and greeting people at functions in Limerick's City Hall, University of Limerick (UL) and the Savoy Hotel. He told The Irish Times in an interview referenced internationally by Reuters that he had been asked if Ireland would split from the European Union. He also launched a €14.8 million grant for former workers at Dell's Limerick plant, described as "conveniently opportune" by former Member of the European Parliament and anti-Lisbonite Patricia McKenna.

On 12 September 2012, Barroso called for the EU to evolve into a "federation of nation-states", necessary to combat the continent's economic crisis. He said he believed Greece would be able to stay in the eurozone if it stood by its commitments. Barroso also heralded the legislative proposal published the same day for European Banking Supervision.

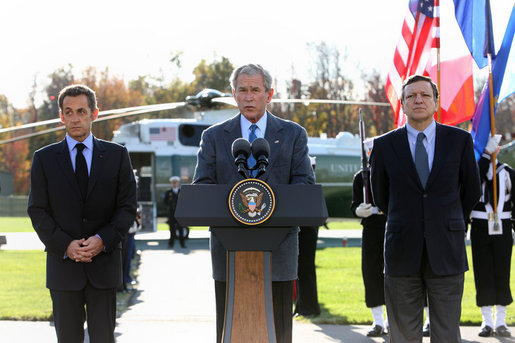
U.S. President George W. Bush, French President Nicolas Sarkozy and Barroso in 2008

He was once appointed Acting Commissioner for Inter-Institutional Relations and Administration in Maroš Šefčovič's stead, from 19 April 2014 – 25 May 2014 while he was on electoral campaign leave for the 2014 elections to the European Parliament. He ultimately decided to not take up his seat.

=== Controversies ===
In 2005, Die Welt reported that Barroso had spent a week on the yacht of the Greek shipping billionaire Spiro Latsis. It emerged soon afterward that this had occurred only a month before the Commission approved 10 million euros of Greek state aid for Latsis's shipping company – though the state aid decision had been taken by the previous European Commission before Barroso took up his post. In response to this revelation, Nigel Farage MEP of the UK Independence Party persuaded around 75 MEPs from across the political spectrum to back a motion of no confidence in Barroso, so as to compel him to appear before the European Parliament to be questioned on the matter. The motion was tabled on 12 May 2005, and Barroso appeared before Parliament as required at a debate on 26 May 2005. The motion itself was heavily defeated.

In response to criticism for his choice of a less fuel efficient Volkswagen Touareg, amid EU legislation of targets drastically to reduce car CO_{2} emissions, Barroso dismissed this as "overzealous moralism".

In April 2008, amid sharp food price rises and mounting food vs fuel concerns, Barroso insisted that biofuel use was "not significant" in pushing up food prices. The following month, he announced a study that would look into the issue. The backdoor approval of the GE potato, by President Barroso, has met a wave of strong opposition from EU member-states. The governments of Greece, Austria, Luxembourg, Italy, Hungary and France have all publicly announced that they will not allow the GE potato to be grown in their countries.

Barroso has expressed criticism of national governments arguing "Decisions taken by the most democratic institutions in the world are very often wrong."

In December 2013 Barroso said that Europe was not the cause of the problems for Ireland; Ireland caused a problem for Europe. Following the bailout exit, in December 2013, the Irish government's bid to get backdated funding for the banking sector was rejected as the head of the European Commission blamed the Irish banks, regulators, and government for the difficulties in the country. Barroso said the problems in the Irish banks caused a "major destabilisation" in the euro, rather than structural problems with the currency itself, "I am saying this because it would be wrong to give the impression that Europe has created a problem for Ireland and now Europe has to help Ireland. In fact, it was the banking sector in Ireland—it was one of the biggest problems in the world in terms of banking stability what happened in Ireland."

=== Post Brussels, 2015-present ===
Barroso is a policy fellow at the Liechtenstein Institute on Self-Determination at Princeton University and the Frederick H. Schultz Class of 1951 Visiting Professor of International Economic Policy at Princeton's Woodrow Wilson School of Public and International Affairs Woodrow Wilson School, where he teaches with Wolfgang F. Danspeckgruber on the EU in International Affairs.

Barroso has been a professor at Portuguese Catholic University since 2015. He has taught at the Institute of Political Studies, at the Catholic Global School of Law, and at the Catholic Lisbon School of Business and Economics, and directs the Center for European Studies from the same institution. From to 2015 2016, he was a guest professor at the University of Geneva and at the Geneva Graduate Institute.

In July 2016, Barroso became senior adviser and non-executive chairman and senior adviser of London-based Goldman Sachs International (GSI), the bank's largest subsidiary. At the time of his appointments, this was regarded as quite controversial, and later led Barroso's successor Jean-Claude Juncker to launch an ethics investigation. Barroso was heavily criticised for taking the position only two months after the 18-month "cooling-off" period for EU officials after they leave their posts. Barroso's move was especially sensitive because Goldman Sachs played a questionable role in the 2008 financial crisis that nearly broke the euro. Furthermore, Barroso announced his move to the London-based subsidiary of Goldman Sachs shortly after the Brexit referendum. The European Commission agreed to an unprecedented ethics inquiry into the move. The independent panel concluded there were "not sufficient grounds to establish a violation of the duty of integrity and discretion" and accepted Barroso's assurances that he would not be lobbying on behalf of the bank's clients.

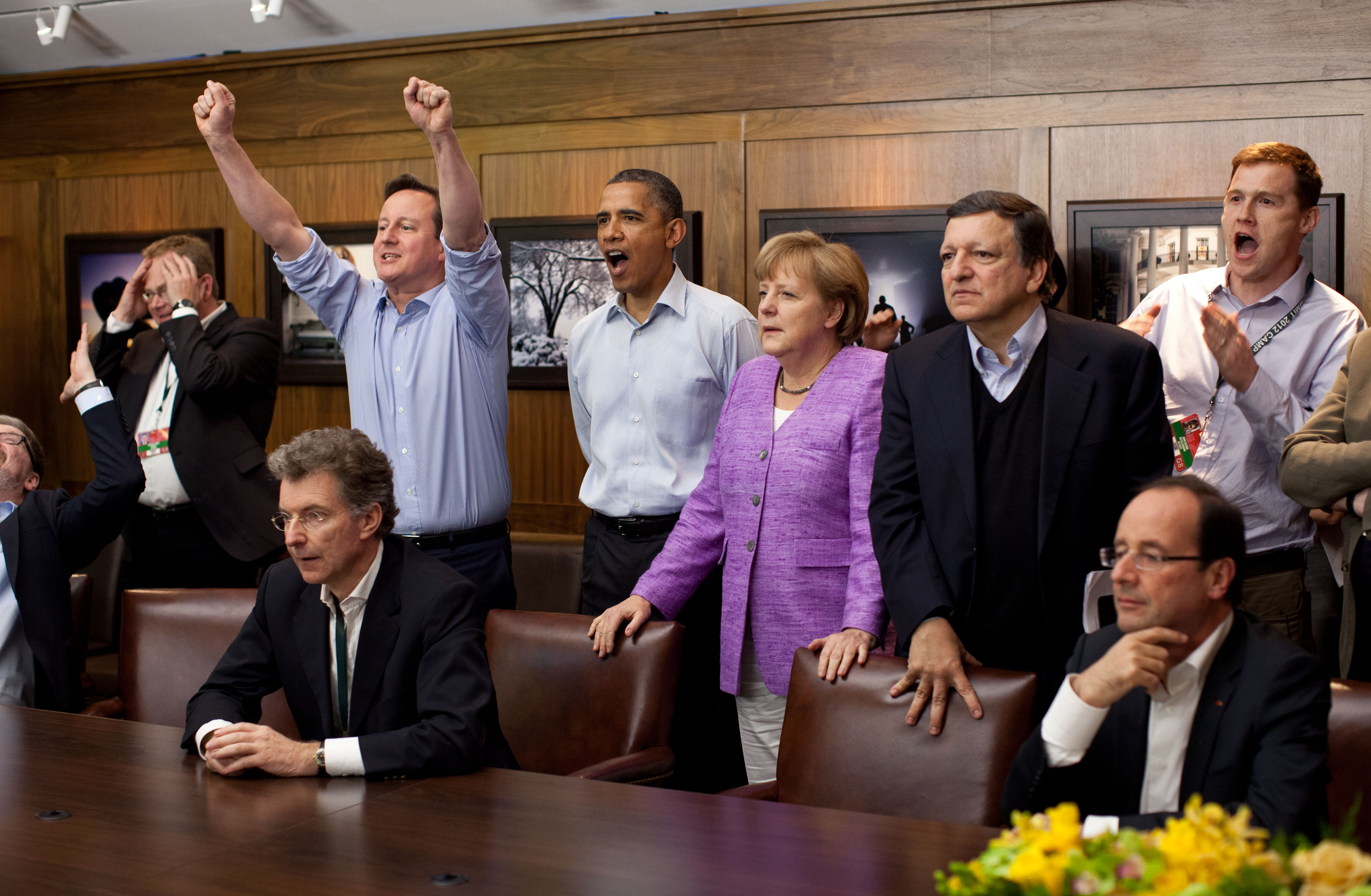
British Prime Minister David Cameron and German Chancellor Angela Merkel watching the 2012 UEFA Champions League Final with Barroso, US President Barack Obama, French President François Hollande and others during the G8 summit.

In 2020, Barroso was selected as chair of the board at GAVI, succeeding Ngozi Okonjo-Iweala.

In addition, Barroso has held several paid and unpaid positions, including:

- International Commission on Financing Global Education Opportunity (led by Gordon Brown), Member (since 2015)
- Bilderberg Meetings, Member of the Steering Committee (since 2014)
- Chatham House, Member of the Panel of Senior Advisers
- European Business Summit (EBS), Honorary Chairman of the Honorary Committee (since 2014)
- Europaeum, Member of the Board of Trustees (since 2014)
- European Movement International, Member of the Honorary Council
- Kofi Annan Foundation, Member of the Electoral Integrity Initiative (EII) (since 2016)
- Lindau Nobel Laureate Meetings, Member of the Honorary Senate
- Women Political Leaders Global Forum (WPL), Member of the Global Advisory Board
- Sunhak Peace Prize Selection Committee, chair.
- UEFA Foundation for Children, Member of the Board of Trustees (2014–2017)

On 15 January 2026 Barroso was appointed as president of the Luso-American Development Foundation (FLAD).

== Personal life ==
In 1980, he married Maria Margarida Pinto Ribeiro de Sousa Uva, with whom he has three sons. Sousa Uva died from uterine cancer in August 2016, at the age of 60.

Apart from Portuguese, Barroso is fluent in French, speaks Spanish and English and has taken a course to acquire a basic knowledge of German.

== Electoral history ==
=== PSD leadership election, 1995 ===
Ballot: 19 February 1995
Candidate	Votes	%
Fernando Nogueira	532	51.6
José Manuel Durão Barroso	499	48.4
Pedro Santana Lopes	withdrew	
Turnout	1,031	
Source: Resultados

=== PSD leadership election, 1999 ===
Ballot: 1 May 1999
Candidate	Votes	%
José Manuel Durão Barroso		100.0
Turnout		
Source: Resultados

=== PSD leadership election, 2000 ===
Ballot: 27 February 2000
Candidate	Votes	%
José Manuel Durão Barroso	469	50.3
Pedro Santana Lopes	313	33.6
Luís Marques Mendes	150	16.1
Turnout	932	
Source: Congresso PSD

=== Legislative election, 2002 ===
Ballot: 17 March 2002
Party	Candidate	Votes	%	Seats	+/−
PSD	José Manuel Durão Barroso	2,200,765	40.2	105	+24
PS	Eduardo Ferro Rodrigues	2,068,584	37.8	96	–19
CDS–PP	Paulo Portas	477,350	8.7	14	–1
CDU	Carlos Carvalhas	379,870	6.9	12	–5
BE	Francisco Louçã	153,877	2.8	3	+1
Other parties		88,542	1.6	0	±0
Blank/Invalid ballots		107,774	2.0	–	–
Turnout		5,473,655	61.48	230	±0
Source: Comissão Nacional de Eleições

=== President of the European Commission election, 2004 ===
Ballot: 22 July 2004
Party	Candidate	Votes	%
EPP	José Manuel Durão Barroso	413	61.5
Against		215	32.0
Abstentions		44	6.5
Turnout		672	
Source: Resultados

=== President of the European Commission election, 2009 ===
Ballot: 16 September 2009
Party	Candidate	Votes	%
EPP	José Manuel Durão Barroso	382	53.2
Against		219	30.5
Abstentions		117	16.3
Turnout		718	
Source: Resultados

== Honours ==
=== National ===
- Grand Collar of the Order of Prince Henry (GColIH, 3 November 2014)
- Grand Cross of the Order of Christ (GCC, 8 June 1996)

=== Foreign ===
- Brazil:
  - Grand Cross of the Order of the Southern Cross (22 August 1991/1 March 1994)
  - Grand Cross of the Order of Rio Branco (25 July 1996)
- East Timor: Great Collar of the Order of Timor-Leste (2010)
- Estonia: First Class of the Order of the Cross of Terra Mariana (23 February 2009)
- Finland: Commander Grand Cross of the Order of the Lion of Finland (8 March 1991)
- Germany: Grand Cross of the Order of Merit of the Federal Republic of Germany (12 November 1990)
- Guinea-Bissau: Medal of the National Order of Merit (4 November 1993)
- Hungary: Grand Cross of the Hungarian Order of Merit (10 October 2002)
- Ivory Coast: Grand Officer of the National Order of the Ivory Coast (18 March 1991)
- Lithuania: Grand Cross of the Order of Vytautas the Great (25 August 2009)
- Malta: Honorary Member of the Xirka Ġieħ ir-Repubblika (3 March 1995)
- Morocco: Grand Cordon of the Order of Ouissam Alaouite (20 February 1995)
- Netherlands: Grand Cross of the Order of Orange-Nassau
- Peru: Grand Cross of the Order of the Sun of Peru (29 November 1994)
- Sovereign Military Order of Malta:
  - Collar of the Order pro merito melitensi (22 May 2010)
  - Grand Cross of the Order pro merito melitensi (21 July 1989)
- Spain: Grand Cross of the Order of Civil Merit (27 October 1993)
- Tunisia: Grand Cordon of the Order of the Republic (26 October 1993)
- United Kingdom: Honorary Companion of the Most Distinguished Order of Saint Michael and Saint George (17 June 1994)

=== Other awards ===
Barroso holds over twenty decorations, including:

- Winner of the Casa da Imprensa prize in the area of politics in 1992
- Named Global Leader for Tomorrow by the World Economic Forum in 1993
- Chosen Personality of the Year in 1991 and 2004 by the Foreign Press Association in Portugal
- Given "Medalla de la Universidad de Alcala de Henares" and "Medalla de Oro de la Ciudad de Zamora", Spain, 2005
- Golden Medal: The Bell Celebration – Message to United Europe, from the Ferdinan Martinengo Company, Slovakia, 2006
- EFR-Business Week Award from Erasmus University Rotterdam, 2006
- Honorary Citizen of Rio de Janeiro, June 2006
- "European of the Year" award by European Voice newspaper, November 2006
- Awarded Honorary HEC diploma, Paris, December 2006
- Special Prize, Business Centre Club, Poland, February 2007; Gold Medal of the city of Lamego, Portugal, April 2007
- Transatlantic Leadership Prize, European Institute, Washington DC, April 2007
- Honorary Citizen of Delphi and Golden Medal of the "Amfiktyons", Delphi, Greece, July 2007
- Academic Title EBAPE – FGV, for the relevant contribution and services towards the study and practice in Administration – Getulio Vargas Foundation, Rio de Janeiro, August 2007
- Conde de Barcelona International Prize from the Conde de Barcelona Foundation, Barcelona, November 2007
- Honorary Medal and Honorary Diploma of the City of Nicosia, Nicosia, January 2008
- Honorary Member, Academia Portuguesa da História, Lisbon, March 2008
- State Medal "Stara Planina" I Degree, Bulgaria, March 2008
- "Prémio Rotary da Paz", Rotary International Distrito 1960 Portugal, Lisbon, April 2008; "Chave de Honra da Cidade de Lisboa", Lisbon, May 2008
- Confraria Queijo S. Jorge, Acores, May 2008
- Ciudadino Andino Honorifico, Lima, Peru, May 2008
- "Transatlantic Business Award", American Chamber of Commerce to the European Union, Brussels, May 2008
- Confraria vinho do Porto, Porto, June 2008
- Gold Medal of the Royal Institute of European Studies, Royal Institute of European Studies Madrid, March 2009
- Gold Medal of the Hellenic Parliament, Athens, April 2009
- Medal of Honour and Benefaction of the City of Athens, Athens, April 2009
- European Excellence Award, by the Government Council of the Community of Madrid, May 2009
- Prix European of the Year, The European Movement in Denmark, Copenhagen, May 2009
- Laureate of the Quadriga Prize 2009 – United for the Better, Berlin, October 2009
- Medal of Merit from the Federação das Associações Portuguesas e Luso-brasileiras, Brazil, July 2010
- "Man of the Year 2009 of Central and Eastern Europe", Krynica, September 2010
- Golden Victoria "European of the Year 2010" award by the Union of German Magazine Publishers VDZ, Berlin, November 2010
- Collier of the Fondation du Mérite européen, Luxembourg, November 2010
- the "Steiger" Award 2011, Bochum, Germany, March 2011
- Charles V Prize, awarded by the Fundación Academia Europea de Yuste, Spain, 2013
- Gold Medal for Outstanding Contribution to Public Discourse, the College Historical Society (CHS) of Trinity College Dublin
- Gold Medal of the Jean Monnet Foundation for Europe, in 2014

==== Honorary degrees ====
- Honorary Degree from Roger Williams University, Rhode Island, 2005
- Honorary Degree in Humanities from Georgetown University, Washington, D.C.
- Honorary Degree in Political Science from the University of Genoa, Italy, 2006
- Honorary Degree in Law from Kobe University, Japan, April 2006
- Honorary Doctorate in Social and Human Sciences from Candido Mendes University, Rio de Janeiro, June 2006
- Honorary Degree of Doctor of Science, University of Edinburgh, November 2006
- Honorary Degree from the Economics Faculty of the "La Sapienza" University of Rome, January 2007
- Honorary doctorate at Warsaw School of Economics, Warsaw, November 2007
- Doctor Honoris Causa degree at the Pontifical Catholic University of Sao Paulo, Brazil, March 2008
- Honorary degree of Doctor of Laws, University of Liverpool, July 2008
- "Prémio Política e Responsabilidade Social", Fundação Luso-Brasileira, Lisbon, October 2008
- Honorary Degree of Doctor, Université Nice Sophia Antipolis, Nice, November 2008
- Doctor Honoris Causa, Tomas Bata University, Zlin, Czech Republic, April 2009
- Honorary doctorate of the Chemnitz University of Technology, Chemnitz, May 2009
- Honorary doctorate of Public and International Affairs, University of Pittsburgh, US, September 2009
- Doctor Honoris Causa, Estácio de Sá University, Rio de Janeiro, July 2010
- Doctorate Honoris Causa, University of Łódź, Poland, October 2010
- Doctorate Honoris Causa, University of Geneva, October 2010
- Doctorate Honoris Causa, University of Bucharest, November 2010
- Honorary Doctorate, Baku State University, Azerbaijan, January 2011
- Honorary Doctorate, Luiss Guido Carli University, Rome, March 2011
- Honorary Doctorate, Ghent University, March 2011
- Honorary Doctorate, National Economic University of Vietnam, August 2014
- Doctorate Honoris Causa, West University of Timișoara, January 2016

== See also ==
- President of the European Commission
- Barroso Commission
- European Union law

== Notes ==
Political offices
Preceded by Carlos Encarnação	Secretary of State Assistant to the Minister of Internal Administration; 1985–1987	Succeeded by José Branquinho Lobo
Preceded by Eduardo Azevedo Soares	Secretary of State for Foreign Affairs and Cooperation; 1987–1992	Succeeded by José Briosa e Gala
Preceded by João de Deus Pinheiro	Minister of Foreign Affairs; 1992–1995	Succeeded by Jaime Gama
Preceded by Marcelo Rebelo de Sousa	Leader of the Opposition; 1999–2002	Succeeded by Eduardo Ferro Rodrigues
Preceded by António Guterres	Prime Minister of Portugal; 2002–2004	Succeeded by Pedro Santana Lopes
Preceded by António Vitorino	Portuguese European Commissioner; 2004–2014	Succeeded by Carlos Moedas
Preceded by Romano Prodi	President of the European Commission; 2004–2014	Succeeded by Jean-Claude Juncker
Party political offices
Preceded by Marcelo Rebelo de Sousa	President of the Social Democratic Party; 1999–2004	Succeeded by Pedro Santana Lopes
Diplomatic posts
Preceded by David Cameron	Chair of the Group of Seven; 2014; Served alongside: Herman Van Rompuy	Succeeded by Angela Merkel
Academic offices
Preceded by Joschka Fischer	Convocation Speaker of the College of Europe; 2004	Succeeded by Javier Solana
