= Peter F. Krogh =

American politician

Peter Frederic Krogh is an academic and diplomat who served as dean of Georgetown University's Edmund A. Walsh School of Foreign Service from 1970 to 1995. Born in California in 1937, Krogh graduated from Harvard University in 1958 with a B.A. cum laude in economics and later received his M.A. and Ph.D. from the Fletcher School of Law and Diplomacy at Tufts University. Since then, prominent positions he has held include White House Fellow, special assistant to the secretary of state, and dean emeritus and distinguished professor of international affairs at Georgetown University.

== Georgetown University ==
In 1970, Peter Krogh became the youngest-ever dean of the Walsh School of Foreign Service (SFS) at the age of 32, and served in that position until 1995. Krogh is often described as the "second founder" of the school after its original founder Edmund A. Walsh. He established a distinct SFS faculty, revised the curriculum, established a faculty advising system, and expanded study abroad opportunities. Additionally, he spearheaded the construction of the Edward B. Bunn, S.J. Intercultural Center (ICC), which now serves as a physical anchor of the Georgetown SFS program.

=== Krogh Scholars ===
The Krogh Scholars program is an honors international affairs program in the Edmund A. Walsh School of Foreign Service named in honor of Dean Krogh. Students are selected for the program based on intellectual and leadership potential and are required to complete an academically rigorous semester seminar and produce an honors quality thesis. Alumni of the Krogh Scholars program have gone on to serve in elite positions in international business, law, national security, journalism, and academia.

== Dean Peter Krogh Foreign Affairs Digital Archives ==
Between 1981 and 2005, Peter Krogh moderated 270 half-hour PBS television programs spread across three television series—American Interests, World Beat, and Great Decisions. In each episode, he interviewed experts, leaders, and other notable individuals about relevant topics of the time. Noteworthy individuals interviewed include Madeleine Albright, Bill Clinton, Jesse Jackson, King Hussein, and many others.

=== Major topics and themes ===
The Digital Archives cover a wide range of topics relating to foreign affairs ranging in date from the late 20th century to the early 21st century, including the Cold War, Terrorism, International Diplomacy, Energy, Human Rights, Immigration, Conflict Resolution, Democracy, Defense and National Security, Environment, Technology, United States' Role in the World, and several others.

=== Regions ===
The archives also contain videos pertaining to a vast spectrum of different regions, with 17 videos on Africa; 25 videos on Asia; 20 videos on Mexico, Central America, and the Caribbean; 21 videos on Europe, 20 videos on the Middle East, 32 videos on Russia and the former USSR; 45 videos on Canada and the United States; and several videos on South America and Turkey.

== Honors ==
- 2003 Men of Substance and Style Award, Washington Life Magazine, Washington, D.C.
- Grand Decoration of Honour in Gold for Services to the Republic of Austria, 2001
- Endowed Professorship named the "Peter F. Krogh Chair in Geopolitics and Justice in International Affairs", Georgetown University, 2000.
- Pacem in Terris Award, La Roche College, 1996
- Doctorate of Laws, Honoris Causa, Georgetown University, 1996
- The Patrick Healy Award of Georgetown University Alumni Association, 1996
- Distinguished Service Award of the Foreign Policy Association, 1995
- Commander's Cross of the Order of Merit of the Federal Republic of Germany, 1995 (also known as Grand Merit Cross (Großes Verdienstkreuz)
- Edward Weintal Special Citation, 1995
- Austrian Cross of Honor for Science and Art, 1993
- Georgetown University President's Medal, 1990
- Emmy Award for "World Beat", 1989
- Honorary Member, Phi Beta Kappa, 1985
- One of 100 Outstanding Young Educators, Change magazine, 1979
- One of Boston's Outstanding Young Men, 1967
- White House Fellowship, 1967
- Honorary Member, The Philodemic Society of Georgetown University

== Publications ==
- "American Foreign Policy in Historical Perspective", Festschrift in honor of Dr. Wolfgang Schürer, St. Gallen University, 2006.
- "It's Time to Fix the Foreign Service", International Herald Tribune, January 20–21, 2001.
- "Scold and Bomb – Clinton 's Failed Foreign Policy", The Wall Street Journal, April 28, 1999.
- “America's Diplomacy, Foreign Affairs Reporting and Diplomatic Capital", ISD Reports, May 1995.
- "The Galilean New World Order Offers an Opportunity to Seize Quickly", International Herald Tribune, August 17, 1994.
- Palestine Under Occupation: Prospects for the Future, co-editor and contributing author, Georgetown University, 1989.
- "U.S. Foreign Policy in a New World of International Cooperation", Looking Ahead, The National Planning Association, February, 1989.
- "Failing to Pay the Price in Foreign Affairs", Washington Star, January 20, 1981.
- "Los Estados Unidos en la Actialid", Carta Politica, Buenos Aires, April, 1979.
- "The Foreign Service and Diplomacy", Foreign Service Journal, November, 1977.
- "Stubborn Realities and the Requirements of American Foreign Policy", Center for Strategic and International Studies, August, 1977.
- Secrecy and Openness in Foreign Policy, co-editor and contributing author. Published by the Konrad Adenauer Foundation, Bonn, 1974.
- "New Directions in American Foreign Policy", Foreign Policy Journal, September, 1973.
- "Education in Diplomacy", Foreign Service Journal, April, 1973.
- "Latin America: Policy in a Decade of Change", Foreign Affairs in the Seventies, The Fletcher School of Law and Diplomacy, 1971.
- "Military Aid to Latin America", chapter in Prospects for Latin America, edited by David Smith, Columbia University, 1970.
- "Dimensions of Foreign Affairs in the '70s", remarks reprinted in the Foreign Service Journal, January, 1969.
- "The State Department at Home", Annals of the American Academy of Political and Social Sciences, January, 1969.

== See also ==
- Georgetown University
