= Gi Group =

Italian employment agency

- Type: SpA
- Industry: Professional services
- Founded: 1998; 28 years ago
- Founder: Stefano Colli Lanzi
- Headquarters: Milan, Italy
- Services: Employment agencies, recruitment, human resource consulting, training, outsourcing
- Revenue: 4.2 billion Euro (2024)
- Net income: 27.4 million Euro (2024)
- Website: gigroup.com

Gi Group is an Italian employment agency and staffing company. It represents the core business of Gi Group Holding, a multinational provider of services for the labour market. Headquartered in Milan and operating in more than 30 countries through a direct presence, the company specialises in operational workforce services for businesses and job seekers, with an annual reach of over 190,000 sourced candidates.

== History ==
Gi Group was established in 1998 as Générale Industrielle, marking its entry into the Italian staffing market. In 2004 the company acquired the employment agency of Fiat Group, Worknet SpA, expanding its domestic presence. The firm diversified its service offering in 2005 to include outplacement, training, HR consultancy, and payroll outsourcing. The Gi Group brand was officially introduced in 2006.

In 2007 the internationalisation process started with acquisitions across Europe, Asia, and South America. Two years later, the acquisition of the UK-based Right4staff allowed for a greater focus on onsite staffing services. The company also organised its operations into global practices between 2013 and 2016, covering areas such as temporary and permanent staffing, executive search and selection, learning and development, outplacement, and business process outsourcing.

Another important acquisition occurred in 2015: the business process outsourcing firm Holomatica, based in Brazil, became part of Gi Group.

A digital collaborative platform, myGiGroup, was introduced a year later for client, candidate, and worker management. Technical integration continued in 2021 with the acquisition of Jobtome, a platform focused on artificial intelligence and automated job posting.

The organisation underwent a corporate reorganisation in 2022, with Gi Group subsequently becoming the core business unit of the Gi Group Holding. Gi Group reached its 25th year of operation in 2023, at which point it maintained a presence in 29 countries. In 2024, the Group completed the acquisition of Kelly Europe's staffing business, marking its largest transaction and increasing Gi Group's presence in Europe and its specialisation in the life sciences sector. In 2024, Gi Group adopted the Blue Leadership framework. This was followed in 2025 by the introduction of the Smarter Proximity operating approach, designed to integrate physical and digital services.

== Operations ==
Gi Group provides recruitment and staffing services divided into specialised operational areas. Gi Group applies an operating model called "Smarter Proximity", which combines technological tools with sector-specific expertise and provides for the centralised coordination of some functions through virtual hubs and flexible service formats. Contingent workforce services include temporary staffing and onsite management, where recruitment and daily operations are administered by teams embedded within the client organisation. The company also acts as a master vendor for the coordination of multiple staffing suppliers where permitted by local legislation, and facilitates the international relocation of candidates.

Strategic hiring services cover the recruitment cycle for long-term placements, including technical and professional roles. These processes use candidate assessment tools, employer branding, and market mapping for the analysis of labour trends.

Gi Group also provides workforce readiness and transformation services, including training, upskilling, and reskilling programmes. Outsourcing services are also offered, such as recruitment process outsourcing for candidate sourcing and onboarding, and business process outsourcing for the management of non-core business activities.

Operational activities are further organised into specialised industry divisions. The company maintains a dedicated division for the life sciences sector (pharmaceuticals, biotechnology, and medical technology), alongside divisions for technical fields such as engineering, energy, logistics, manufacturing, construction, and automotive and e-mobility. Additional areas include banking and insurance, IT and consultancy, retail, fashion and luxury, fast-moving consumer goods, alongside services for contact centres, facility management, and HoReCa.
