= Liverpool bid for the 2022 Commonwealth Games =

Liverpool bid for the 2022 Commonwealth
- Logo of Liverpool's 2022 Commonwealth Games bid
- Host city: Liverpool, England
- Motto: Transformational
- Main venue: Anfield Stadium
- Website: http://liverpoolcg22.org/

The Liverpool bid for the 2022 Commonwealth Games was a proposed bid by Liverpool, England and Commonwealth Games England to host the 2022 Commonwealth Games. On 7 September 2017, it was announced that the UK Government would be supporting the Birmingham bid meaning Liverpool would not proceed further.

== Background ==
Liverpool was actually planning to bid for the 2026 Commonwealth Games. On 13 March 2017, Commonwealth Games Federation stripped Durban, South Africa of their rights to host the 2022 Commonwealth Games and reopened the bid process for the 2022 games. On 16 June 2017, Liverpool announced they would bid for the 2022 Commonwealth Games. Brian Barwick was the chairman of the bid. Liverpool City Council, Mayor of Liverpool Joe Anderson Everton F.C. CEO Robert Elstone, English footballer Wayne Rooney, Liverpool F.C. CEO Peter Moore and coach Steven Gerrard also supported the bid.

== Cost ==
The total cost of hosting the Liverpool 2022 Commonwealth Games is anticipated to be in the region of £672 million (US$871 million), with £547 million (US$710 million) expected to come from the public sector. Liverpool City Council will contribute a quarter of this (£137 million) from its “invest to earn” strategy and existing resources as well as through various income steams raised from the Games.

== Plans ==
Liverpool's "transformational plan" for the 2022 games was predicted to accelerate £1 billion ($1.3 billion/€1.1 billion) of investment up to 10 years ahead of schedule and create more than 12,000 jobs. Liverpool was ranked as the UK's Greatest Sporting City for 2017, according to research from ESPN and the University of Bath.

The new Everton football stadium would accommodate a temporary athletics track for the Games. It is claimed this will be "without any disruption to those features" with the track due to be installed after the final home game of the 2021-2022 season and removed before the first scheduled match of the 2022-2023 campaign.

The city was also proposing to host swimming at a new 50 metres pool within the city centre dock system that would remain in place after the Games and provide both a swimming and visitor attraction legacy. Among the other proposals was triple jump, long jump and pole vault on the dockside by neighbouring Mann Island in the city.

Twenty20 cricket and track cycling, as Liverpool 2022's "optional sports", would take place in Manchester at Old Trafford Cricket Ground and the Manchester Velodrome.

Other key highlights of Liverpool's hosting plan included five existing venues. The Arena and Convention Centre Liverpool, home to the 11,000-seat Echo Arena, BT Convention Centre and Exhibition Centre Liverpool, would stage badminton, artistic gymnastics, judo, netball and wrestling. Liverpool FC's Anfield stadium was cited as the venue for the ceremonies and rugby sevens, while St George's Hall and Goodison Park would host the squash and boxing finals respectively and Stanley Park would stage the lawn bowls.

Athletes’ Village would be beside Everton FC's new stadium in Nelson Dock, within Peel Land and Property's £5.5 billion ($7 billion/€6.3 billion) Liverpool Waters scheme - residential developments that already have outlined planning permission meaning construction could start in the first half of 2018.

== Venues ==
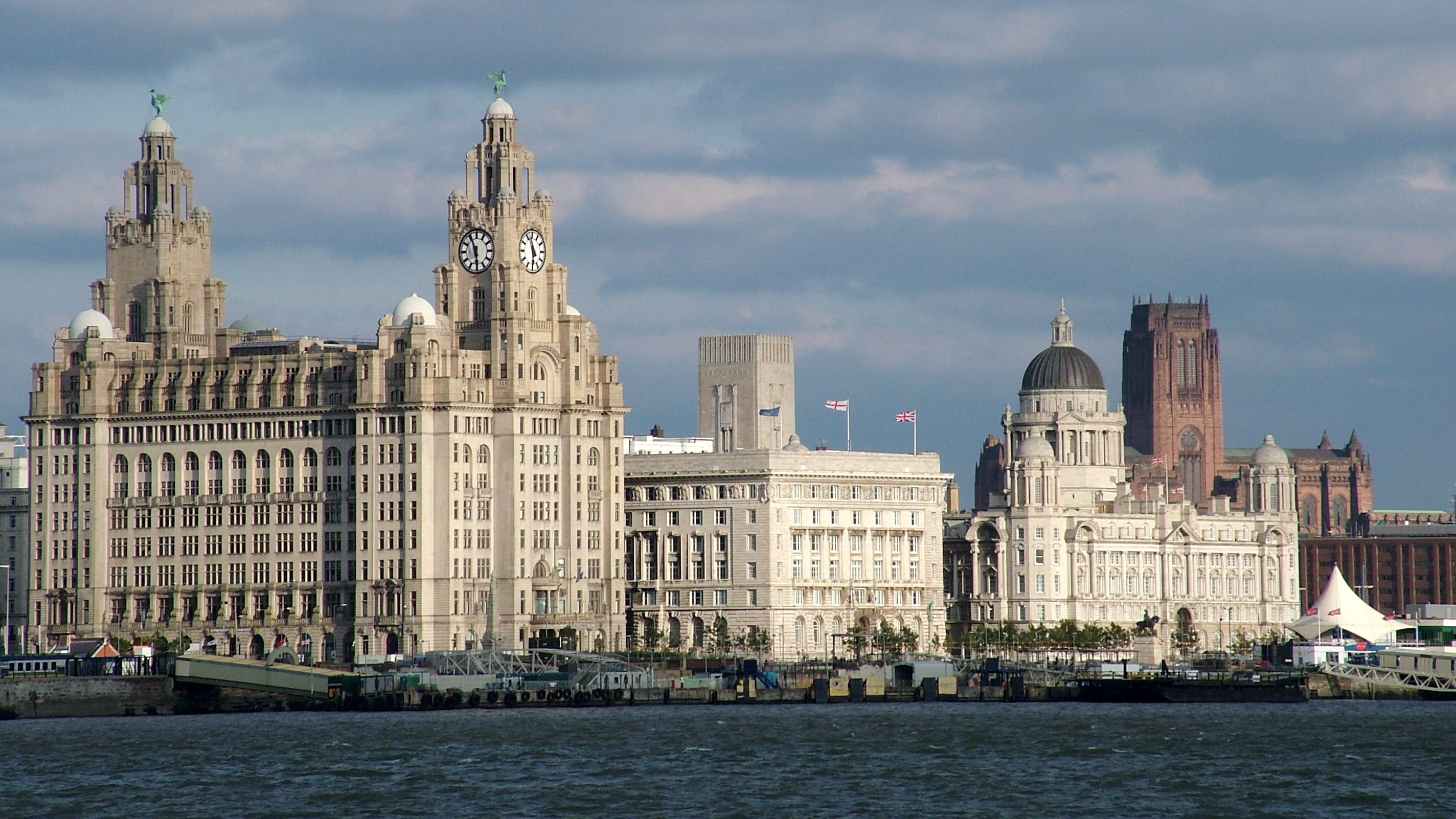
Liverpool Pier Head

The venues proposed for the games are the following:

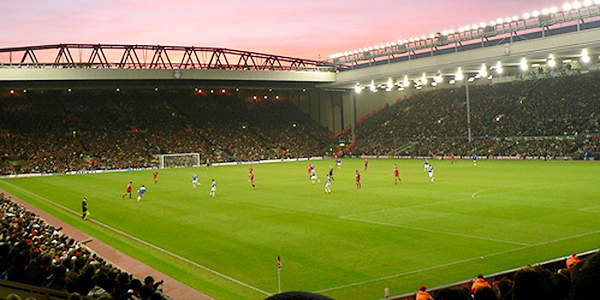
Anfield Stadium

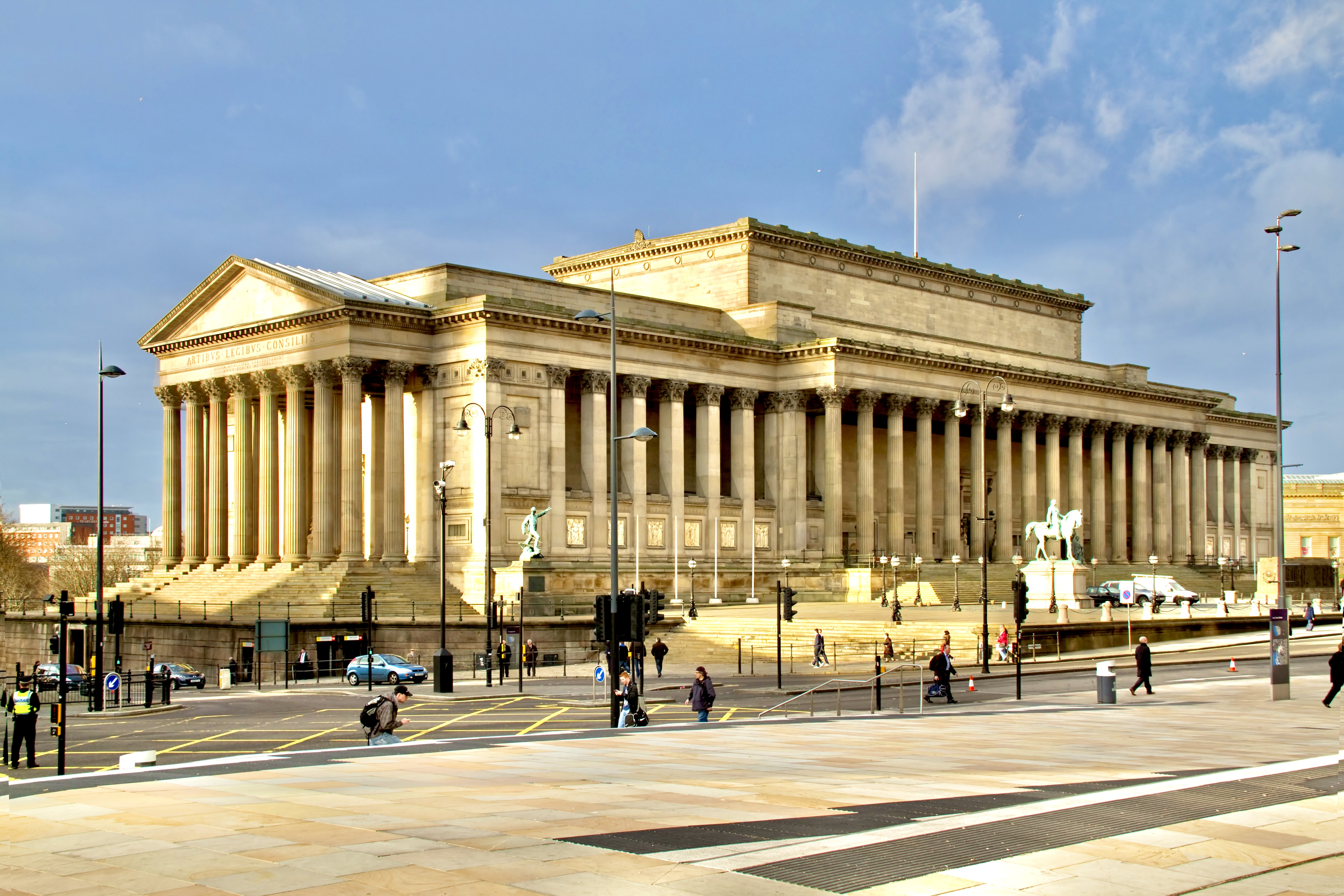
St George's Hall

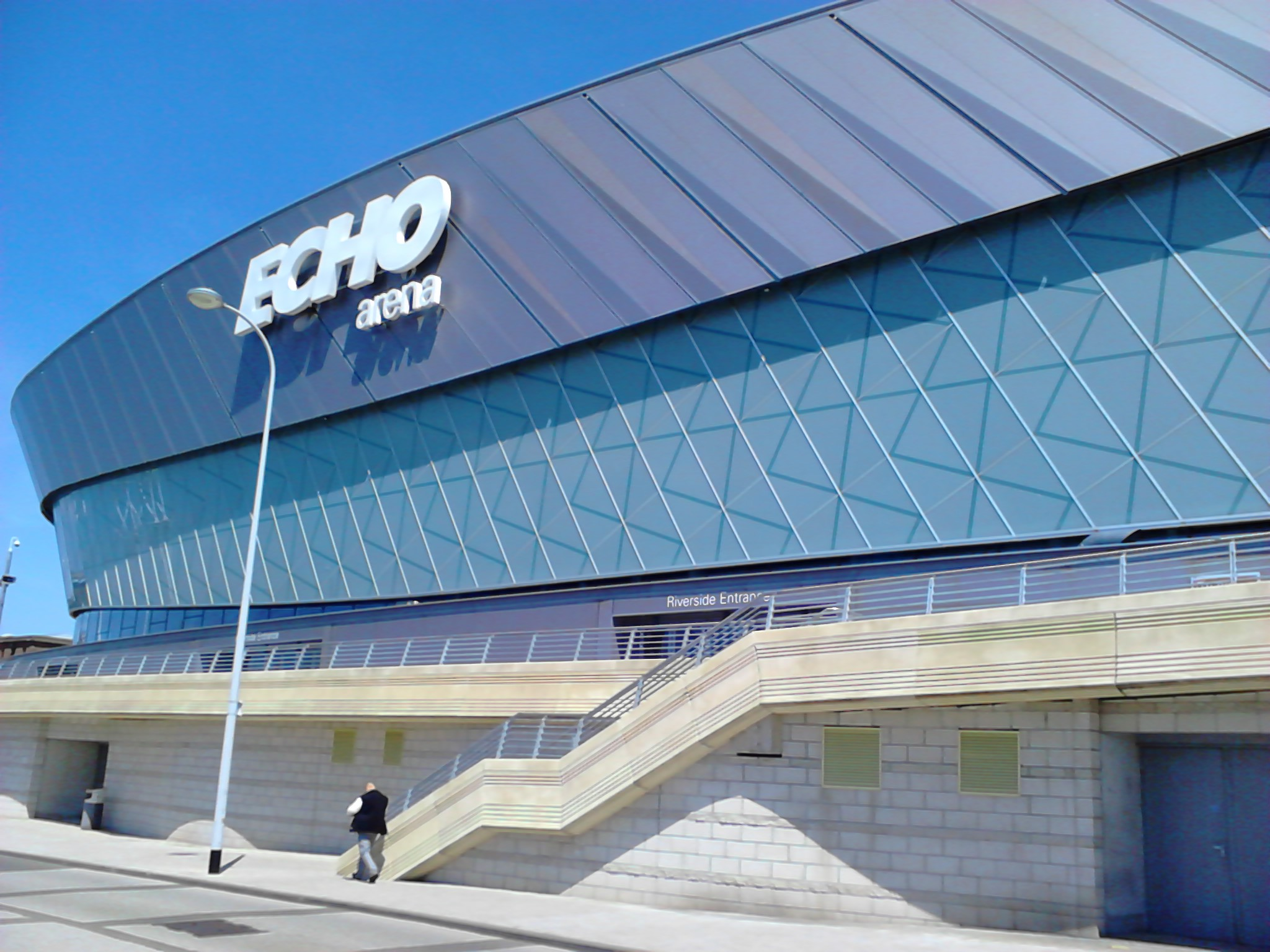
Echo Arena at the ACC Liverpool complex

=== Venues in Liverpool ===
Venue	Sport	Capacity	Status
Anfield Stadium	Ceremonies Rugby	54,000	Existing
Bramley Moore Dock Stadium	Athletics	50,000	New
Goodison Park Stadium	Boxing	40,000	Existing
Stanley Park	Bowls	2,500	Existing
Liverpool Olympia	Weightlifting Powerlifting	4,000	Existing
St George's Hall	Squash	2,000	Existing
Mann Island	Triathlon Road Races	1,000	Existing
Pier Head	Triathlon Cycling	1,000	Existing
The Docks	Swimming	2,500	New
ACC Liverpool	Netball Artistic Gymnastics Judo Badminton	12,000	Existing
Liverpool Tennis Centre	Tennis	1,000	Existing
Wyncote Sports Ground	Hockey	1,000	Existing

=== Venues in Manchester ===
Venue	Sport	Capacity	Status
National Cycling Centre	Cycling	3,500	Existing
National Squash Centre	Squash	1,200	Existing
Old Trafford Cricket Ground	Cricket (Twenty20)	25,000	Existing

== See also ==
- 2002 Commonwealth Games at Manchester, England
- 1934 Commonwealth Games at London, England
