= Free Burma Coalition =

The Free Burma Coalition was created in 1995.
