= Argyll Velodrome =

Cycle velodrome in Edmonton, Alberta

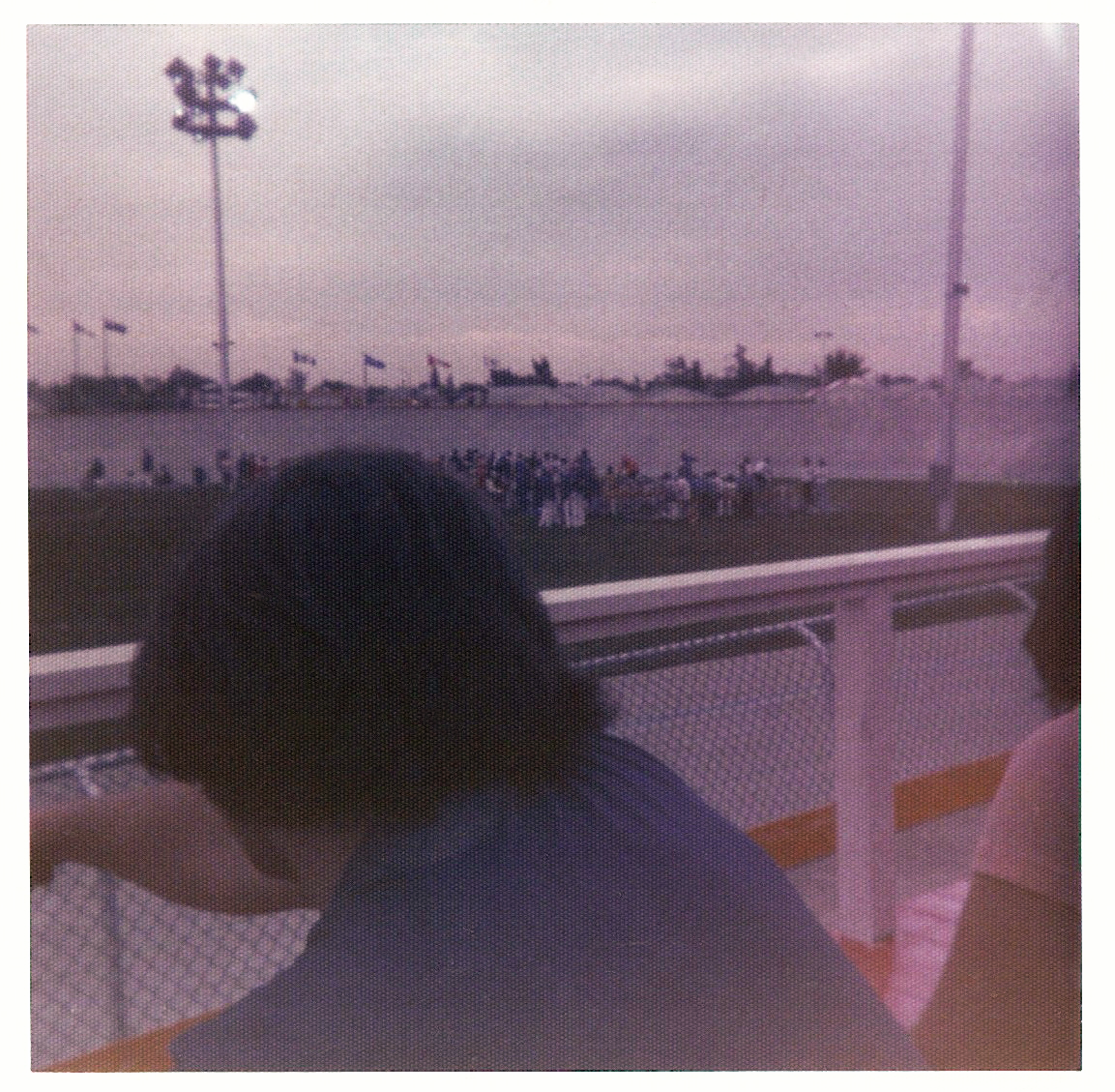
- A cycling event at the Argyll Velodrome during the 1978 Commonwealth Games
- Interactive map of Argyll Velodrome
- Location: 6850 88 Street, Edmonton, Alberta
- Coordinates: 53.507320°N 113.462749°W
- Operator: Argyll Velodrome Association
- Surface: Concrete
- Field size: 333.33 m (1,093.6 ft) x 7 m (23 ft)

Construction
- Built: 1976
- Opened: 1977
- Closed: September 1989 - August 1996

The Argyll Velodrome is an outdoor velodrome in Edmonton, Alberta, Canada. The velodrome is 333.333 m (1,093.61 ft) x 7 m (23 ft) wide with a 37 degree banked concrete surface.

== History ==
The velodrome was built for the 1978 Commonwealth Games and later also hosted the track cycling competitions at the 1983 Summer Universiade. The velodrome was closed between September 1989 and August 1996. Later it hosted the 2001 National Track Cycling Championships and 2005 World Masters' Games. In September 2007 Edmonton unveiled plans to build a new velodrome to replace the Argyll Velodrome. In October 2012 the city council approved the proposal for the Coronation Park Sports and Recreation Centre, which includes an indoor track for the Coronation area. It's currently under construction and scheduled to open in early 2026; the track will be 250 m (820.21 ft) and made of Siberian pine.

== See also ==
- List of Commonwealth Games venues
- List of cycling tracks and velodromes
