= Bids for the Commonwealth Games =

Bids for the Commonwealth Games is the process where Commonwealth Games Associations select from within their national territory cities to put forward bids to host a Commonwealth Games. Since the creation of the Commonwealth Games Federation in 1932, which successfully appropriated the name of the Inter-Empire Championships to create a modern sporting event for the members of the Commonwealth, interested cities have rivalled for selection as host of the Commonwealth Games.

What follows is a list of the cities that have bid to host any of the Commonwealth Games. 20 cities (including repeats) have been chosen to host the Commonwealth Games; four in America, three in Asia, eight in Europe, one in the Caribbean and eight in Oceania. No African city has ever been chosen to host a Commonwealth Games.

== Process ==
The General Assembly of the CGF is responsible for deciding who will host the Commonwealth Games, 8 years prior to the games in question once all bids have been submitted. The selection process is made in accordance with the Candidate City Manual, as drafted by the Executive Board and made available to candidates 18 months before a decision is made. The federation then entrusts the organisation of the games to the organising committee, CGA, and government of the winning host nation or territory, including the security and finance, but is still monitored by the federation.

== Commonwealth Games ==
Games	Year	Bid party		Result	Final selection process		Note	Ref.
Games	Year	City	CGAs	Result	Date	CGF General Assembly	Note	Ref.
I	1930	Hamilton	Canada	Awarded to host the I Commonwealth Games (sole bid)				
II	1934	~~Johannesburg~~	~~South Africa~~	Awarded to host the II Commonwealth Games (moved to London)			(Note: The 1934 British Empire Games (now known as the Commonwealth Games) was originally awarded to Johannesburg, South Africa but was later awarded to London, England. The reason for this change was to avoid a political crisis over South Africa's Apartheid policy and its implications on visiting Commonwealth athletes and officials. The move came after concerns, particularly from Canada, about the way South Africa would treat black and Asian athletes."1934 - London". Inside the Games. Archived from the original on 2016-08-05.)	
II	1934	London	England	Inherently awarded to host the II Commonwealth Games				
III	1938	Sydney	Australia	Awarded to host the III Commonwealth Games (sole bid)				
–	~~1942~~	~~Montreal~~	~~Canada~~	Awarded to host the IV Commonwealth Games (cancelled)			(Note: The 1942 British Empire Games (now known as the Commonwealth Games) was cancelled due to the Second World War. "What are the Commonwealth Games and who takes part?". BBC. Archived from the original on 2014-03-09.)	
–	~~1946~~	~~Cardiff~~	~~Wales~~	Awarded to host the IV Commonwealth Games (cancelled)			(Note: The 1946 British Empire Games (now known as the Commonwealth Games) was cancelled due to the Second World War. "What are the Commonwealth Games and who takes part?". BBC. Archived from the original on 2014-03-09.)	
IV	1950	Auckland	New Zealand	Awarded to host the IV Commonwealth Games (sole bid)				
V	1954	Vancouver	Canada	Awarded to host the V Commonwealth Games	1950	Auckland		
V	1954	Toronto	Canada	Eliminated	1950	Auckland		
V	1954	Montreal	Canada	Eliminated	1950	Auckland		
V	1954	Hamilton	Canada	Eliminated	1950	Auckland		
VI	1958	Cardiff	Wales	Awarded to host the VI Commonwealth Games (sole bid)				
VII	1962	Perth	Australia	Awarded to host the VII Commonwealth Games (sole bid)				
VIII	1966	Kingston	Jamaica	Awarded to host the VIII Commonwealth Games (17 votes)		Rome		
VIII	1966	Edinburgh	Scotland	Eliminated in the first voting (12 votes)		Rome		
VIII	1966	Salisbury	Rhodesia and Nyasaland	Eliminated in the first voting (5 votes)		Rome		
IX	1970	Edinburgh	Scotland	Awarded to host the IX Commonwealth Games (18 votes)		Kingston		
IX	1970	Christchurch	New Zealand	Eliminated in the first voting (11 votes)		Kingston		
X	1974	Christchurch	New Zealand	Awarded to host the X Commonwealth Games (36 votes)		Edinburgh		
X	1974	Melbourne	Australia	Eliminated in the first voting (2 votes)		Edinburgh		
XI	1978	Edmonton	Canada	Awarded to host the XI Commonwealth Games (36 votes)		Munich		
XI	1978	Leeds	England	Eliminated in the first voting (10 votes)		Munich		
XII	1982	Brisbane	Australia	Awarded to host the XII Commonwealth Games (unanimous vote)	14 July 1976	Montreal		
XII	1982	Birmingham	England	Withdrew during the candidature stage	14 July 1976	Montreal		
XII	1982	Kuala Lumpur	Malaysia	Withdrew during the candidature stage	14 July 1976	Montreal		
XII	1982	Lagos	Nigeria	Withdrew during the candidature stage	14 July 1976	Montreal		
XIII	1986	Edinburgh	Scotland	Awarded to host the XIII Commonwealth Games (sole bid)				
XIV	1990	Auckland	New Zealand	Awarded to host the XIV Commonwealth Games (20 votes)		Los Angeles		
XIV	1990	Delhi	India	Eliminated in the first voting (19 votes)		Los Angeles		
XV	1994	Victoria	Canada	Awarded to host the XV Commonwealth Games (29 votes)		Seoul		
XV	1994	Cardiff	Wales	Eliminated in the first voting (18 votes)		Seoul		
XV	1994	Delhi	India	Eliminated in the first voting (7 votes)		Seoul		
XVI	1998	Kuala Lumpur	Malaysia	Awarded to host the XVI Commonwealth Games (40 votes)		Barcelona		
XVI	1998	Adelaide	Australia	Eliminated in the first voting (25 votes)		Barcelona		
XVII	2002	Manchester	England	Awarded to host the XVII Commonwealth Games (sole bid)	05 November 1995	Nassau		
XVIII	2006	Melbourne	Australia	Awarded to host the XVIII Commonwealth Games (sole bid)	11 November 1999	Suva		
XIX	2010	Delhi	India	Awarded to host the XIX Commonwealth Games (46 votes)	14 November 2003	Montego Bay		
XIX	2010	Hamilton	Canada	Eliminated in the first voting (22 votes)	14 November 2003	Montego Bay		
XX	2014	Glasgow	Scotland	Awarded to host the XX Commonwealth Games (47 votes)	9 November 2007	Colombo		
XX	2014	Abuja	Nigeria	Eliminated in the first voting (24 votes)	9 November 2007	Colombo		
XX	2014	Halifax	Canada	Withdrew during the candidature stage	9 November 2007	Colombo		
XXI	2018	Gold Coast	Australia	Awarded to host the XXI Commonwealth Games (43 votes)	11 November 2011	Basseterre		
XXI	2018	Hambantota	Sri Lanka	Eliminated in the first voting (27 votes)	11 November 2011	Basseterre		
XXII	2022	~~Durban~~	~~South Africa~~	Awarded to host the XXII Commonwealth Games and later withdrew	2 September 2015	Auckland		
XXII	2022	Edmonton	Canada	Withdrew during the candidature stage	2 September 2015	Auckland		
XXII	2022	Birmingham	England	Awarded to host the XXII Commonwealth Games (sole bid)	21 December 2017	Birmingham		
XXIII	2026	~~Victoria~~	~~Australia~~	Awarded to host the XXIII Commonwealth Games and later withdrew	12 April 2022	Ballarat		
XXIII	2026	Hobart	Australia	Eliminated in the final vote	12 April 2022	Ballarat		
XXIII	2026	Glasgow	Scotland	Awarded to host the XXIII Commonwealth Games (sole bid)	17 September 2024	Edinburgh		
XXIV	2030	Amdavad	India	Awarded to host the XXIV Commonwealth Games (sole bid)	26 November 2025	Glasgow		
XXIV	2030	Abuja	Nigeria	Eliminated in the bid evaluation stage	26 November 2025	Glasgow		
XXIV	2030	Canada	Canada	Withdrew during the candidature stage	26 November 2025	Glasgow		

== Commonwealth Youth Games ==
Games	Year	Bid party		Result	Final selection process		Note	Ref.
Games	Year	City	Nation	Result	Date	CGF General Assembly	Note	Ref.
I	2000	Edinburgh	Scotland	Awarded to host the 2000 Commonwealth Youth Games (sole bid)				
II	2004	Bendigo	Australia	Awarded to host the 2004 Commonwealth Youth Games (sole bid)				
III	2008	Pune	India	Awarded to host the 2008 Commonwealth Youth Games	13 March 2006			
III	2008	Isle of Man	Isle of Man	Eliminated in the first round of voting	13 March 2006			
IV	2012 (moved up to 2011)	Isle of Man	Isle of Man	Awarded to host the 2012 Commonwealth Youth Games (sole bid)				
V	2015	Apia	Samoa	Awarded to host the 2015 Commonwealth Youth Games (sole bid)				
VI	2017	~~Castries~~	~~Saint Lucia~~	Awarded to host the 2017 Commonwealth Youth Games and later withdrew				
VI	2017	Nassau	The Bahamas	Awarded to host the 2017 Commonwealth Youth Games	2016			
–	~~2021~~	~~Belfast~~	~~Northern Ireland~~	Awarded to host the 2021 Commonwealth Youth Games and later withdrew				
–	~~2021~~	Gaborone	Botswana	Withdrew during the candidature stage				
–	~~2021~~	Saint Helier	Jersey	Withdrew during the candidature stage				
–	~~2021~~	~~Trinidad and Tobago~~	~~Trinidad and Tobago~~	Awarded to host the 2021 Commonwealth Youth Games and later postponed	21 June 2019			
–	~~2021~~	Gibraltar	Gibraltar	Eliminated in the first round of voting	21 June 2019			
VII	2023	Trinidad and Tobago	Trinidad and Tobago	Awarded to host the 2023 Commonwealth Youth Games (sole bid)	28 August 2022			
VIII	2027	Malta	Malta	Awarded to host the 2027 Commonwealth Youth Games (sole bid)	31 July 2025	Buskett Gardens		
