= Canadian Paralympics =

Canadian Paralympics may refer to:

- 1976 Summer Paralympics, in Toronto, Ontario
- 2010 Winter Paralympics, in Vancouver, B.C.
- Canadian Paralympic Committee (CPC)
- Canada at the Paralympics
- Canadian Paralympic Athletics Championships
  - 2005 Canadian Paralympic Athletics Championships

== See also ==
- 2015 Parapan American Games, the 2015 Pan Am "paralympic" Games, in Toronto, Ontario
- Canadian olympics (disambiguation)
- Canadian Pan Am Games (disambiguation)
- Canadian Commonwealth Games (disambiguation)
- Special Olympics Canada
