= Canadian Pan Am Games =

There have been several Canadian Pan Am Games:

- 1967 Pan American Games in Winnipeg, Manitoba
- 1999 Pan American Games in Winnipeg, Manitoba
- 2015 Pan American Games in Toronto, Ontario
  - 2015 Parapan American Games in Toronto, Ontario
- Canada at the Pan American Games

== See also ==
- Canadian olympics (disambiguation)
- Canadian paralympics (disambiguation)
- Canadian Commonwealth Games (disambiguation)
