= Canadian Commonwealth Games =

Canadian Commonwealth Games or Canadian British Empire Games may refer to:

- 1930 British Empire Games, in Hamilton, Ontario
- 1954 British Empire and Commonwealth Games, in Vancouver, B.C.
- 1978 Commonwealth Games, in Edmonton, Alberta
- 1994 Commonwealth Games, in Victoria, B.C.
- Halifax bid for the 2014 Commonwealth Games
- Commonwealth Games Canada
- Canada at the Commonwealth Games

== See also ==
- Canadian olympics (disambiguation)
- Canadian paralympics (disambiguation)
- Canadian Pan Am Games (disambiguation)
