= Glasgow bid for the 2014 Commonwealth Games =

- Logo of Glasgow's 2014 Commonwealth Games bid
- Host city: Glasgow, Scotland
- Events: 261 events in 18 sports
- Opening: 23 July
- Closing: 3 August
- Main venue: Hampden Park and Celtic Park
- Website: http://www.glasgow2014.com/

The Glasgow bid for the 2014 Commonwealth Games was the successful bid to host the 2014 Commonwealth Games by the city of Glasgow, Scotland. It beat the Abuja 2014 Commonwealth Games bid to host the games. The event was held over 11 days, with the opening ceremony taking place on 23 July 2014, and the last day of competition and the closing ceremony on 3 August 2014.

== Background ==
Glasgow had been known as "The Second City of the Empire", the population of the City of Glasgow unitary authority is 578,790. 1,171,390 people live in the Greater Glasgow Urban Area based on the 2001 census.

Glasgow has never hosted such a large international sporting event as the Commonwealth Games, although Glasgow has hosted the 1978 IAAF World Cross Country Championships, 1990 European Indoor Athletics Championships and many European club football finals and many UK sporting events in the city.

Glasgow was originally announced as the Scottish candidate over Edinburgh (which hosted the Games in 1970 and 1986, and the inaugural 2000 Commonwealth Youth Games) following a cost-benefit analysis by the Scottish Executive.

== Venues ==
The Glasgow bid consisted of a mix of new and refurbished venues, linked by enhanced roads and public transport network, as well as an athlete's village, built specifically for the games and situated adjacent to key venues.

Hampden Park, Scotland's National Football Stadium, would be the main venue for athletics and for the closing ceremony, while Celtic Park would be used for the opening ceremony.

The Scottish Exhibition and Conference Centre, on the north bank of the River Clyde, would provide several multipurpose arena style venues as well as the planned Scottish National Arena for events such as gymnastics, boxing, wrestling, weightlifting, and judo as well as hosting associated entertainments events for the duration of the games.

Kelvingrove Park, in the city's West End, already has five bowling greens installed for competitive use. A comprehensive upgrade and refurbishment of the park is underway, and the park is also capable of holding events such as triathlon and hockey, although Glasgow Green could be a possible alternative venue for the latter events. Kelvingrove Park is situated close to the SECC and is adjacent to the Kelvin Hall, which could also potentially host several indoor events. Ibrox Stadium is the planned venue for the rugby sevens tournament. The shooting competition will likely take place at another outdoor venue in the city, such as Pollok Park or the military Dechmont ranges in Cambuslang. If rowing was included as an event, it would likely be held at Strathclyde Park, which hosted the 2006 Commonwealth Rowing Championships.

A new Indoor Arena and Velodrome Complex is planned for Parkhead in the East End of the city, the velodrome itself will be opposite Celtic Park, which will be used for the opening ceremony. These venues would be built regardless of the outcome of Glasgow's bid, and would become the headquarters of sportscotland and Scottish Cycling, and could be expected to host events such as netball, squash, badminton and table tennis, as well as track cycling. Adjacent to this, a potential site for an athletes' village has also been identified in Dalmarnock. The village would be purpose-built to house 6,000 athletes and officials in 2,500 residential units and leave a legacy of regeneration in this deprived district of the city. Nearby Tollcross Park Aquatics Centre, which already has one Olympic standard 50 metre swimming pool, would be extensively upgraded, and a second 50-metre pool would be added for the Games' aquatic events.

The Glasgow 2014 Bid Committee issued a list of 17 sports that they planned to host:

- Athletics
- Aquatics (Swimming and Diving)
- Boxing
- Badminton
- Squash
- Weightlifting
- Bowls
- Field hockey
- Rugby sevens (men)
- Netball (women)
- Cycling
- Shooting
- Wrestling
- Judo
- Gymnastics
- Table tennis
- Triathlon

The Scottish Government and Glasgow City Council have agreed to underwrite the costs of staging the Games. This will be on the basis of an 80/20 split, with an estimated 20% split costing the city £288m to stage the event. 80% of the costs will be covered by the Executive with new money committed to the sports and major events budget.

£1 billion will be spent on enhancements to the city's transport infrastructure by 2014, including completion of major motorway links, like the M74 and East End Regeneration Route, the Glasgow Airport Rail Link, improved city centre rail links as a result of the Glasgow Crossrail scheme, light rapid transport to key facilities such as the SECC and possible refurbishment and extension of the Glasgow Subway as well as improvements to the River Clyde including new bridges and river-based transport.

== Evaluation process ==
The deadline for formal submission of bids to the CGF, in the form of a Candidate City File, was set for May 2007. The Evaluation Commission visited Glasgow on 10 June to 13 June 2007. The conclusions of the CGF Evaluation Commission were that: "Glasgow submitted a complete and well researched Candidature File. Overall proposals are grounded in a thoughtful and practical approach considering currently codified Commonwealth Games requirements. In particular, venue and legacy issues were appropriately addressed with obvious sensitivity to Glasgow's long term needs...Glasgow has shown it has the ability to stage the 2014 Commonwealth Games to a standard which would continue to enhance the image and prestige of the Games." This put Glasgow ahead in terms of the technical comprehensiveness of its bid.

== Reaction ==
Alex Salmond the First Minister of Scotland said:

We will make these games the greatest sporting event our country has ever seen. This will be our chance to show the whole world the very best of Scotland

Michael Fennell the CGF President, said:

Glasgow has shown enormous professionalism in putting the bid together and we are very confident that they will back that up now with a strong organising committee and one that recognises the necessary partnerships required in making the Games a success...Our evaluation commission came away very impressed with the plans Glasgow have for the Games...People of Glasgow are passionate about their sport. We know we will get good spectator support across all events and we are very confident that the Games in Glasgow will attract the necessary commercial support as well.

== See also ==
- 2014 Commonwealth Games bids
- Abuja 2014 Commonwealth Games bid
- Halifax 2014 Commonwealth Games bid
- Glasgow bid for the 2018 Summer Youth Olympics
- Glasgow bid for the 2026 Commonwealth Games
