= Canadian Olympics =

Canadian Olympics can mean:

- Canadian Olympic Committee
- 1976 Summer Olympics in Montreal, Quebec
- 1988 Winter Olympics in Calgary, Alberta
- 2010 Winter Olympics in Vancouver, B.C.
- Canada at the Olympics
- Any of the failed Olympic host city bids:
  - Montreal 1932 Winter Olympics bid
  - Montreal 1936 Winter Olympics bid
  - Montreal 1944 Winter Olympics bid
  - Montreal 1944 Summer Olympics bid
  - Montreal 1956 Winter Olympics bid
  - Montreal 1956 Summer Olympics bid
  - Calgary 1964 Winter Olympics bid
  - Calgary 1968 Winter Olympics bid
  - Calgary 2026 Winter Olympics bid
  - Banff 1972 Winter Olympics bid
  - Montreal 1972 Summer Olympics bid
  - Whistler 1976 Winter Olympics bid
  - Toronto 1996 Summer Olympics bid
  - Quebec City 2002 Winter Olympics bid
  - Toronto 2008 Summer Olympics bid

== See also ==
- Canadian paralympics (disambiguation)
  - 1976 Summer Paralympics in Toronto, Ontario
  - 2010 Winter Paralympics in Vancouver, B.C.
- Canadian Commonwealth Games (disambiguation)
- Special Olympics Canada
