= Bids for the 2026 Commonwealth Games =

Overview
- XXIII Commonwealth Games
- Winner: Glasgow

Details
- Committee: Commonwealth Games Scotland

Previous Games hosted

Decision
- Result: Glasgow (unanimous)

The Commonwealth Games is a quadrennial international multi-sport event that brings together athletes from across the Commonwealth of Nations, a political association comprising the majority of former territories of the British Empire.

An extensive bidding process for the 2026 Commonwealth Games began in 2018 and concluded in 2022 with the state of Victoria, Australia, being announced as the host. Originally, the host city was to be revealed in 2019 in Rwanda, but this was cancelled due to a lack of interest. Victoria's bid was confirmed by Dame Louise Martin, head of the Commonwealth Games Federation (CGF). However, after Victoria withdrew as host in July 2023, citing the unwillingness to spend A$7 billion on a 12-day event, a second selection process was initiated. This culminated in Glasgow being chosen as the new host for the 2026 Commonwealth Games.

== Second selection ==
On 18 July 2023, Victoria Premier Daniel Andrews and Deputy Premier Jacinta Allan announced the state government intended to cancel the 2026 Victorian Games. Fifteen months after agreeing to host the Games, the Premier said the cost had escalated to an estimated A$6–7 billion, double the estimated economic benefits for the state, and the government could not justify the expense. The state said it would terminate its host agreement with the Commonwealth Games Federation and seek a settlement of the contract. The withdrawal prompted a new search for a host for the 2026 Games.

Following the cancellation of Victoria in hosting the 2026 Commonwealth Games, other countries explored the possibility of hosting the games in place of Victoria.

=== Winner ===
City	Country	Commonwealth Games Committee	Result
Glasgow	Scotland	Commonwealth Games Scotland (CGS)	Winner
Further information: Glasgow bid for the 2026 Commonwealth Games On 11 April 2024, it was announced that Glasgow was being considered as a "last possibility" to host the 2026 Commonwealth Games if no other host emerged, as a way to safeguard the event. The Games were proposed to be on a smaller scale, with venues from the 2014 Commonwealth Games being reused, and athlete accommodation possibly comprising a mix of hotels and student residences from Glasgow Caledonian University and the University of Glasgow. The costs would be fully covered by the Commonwealth Games Federation and corporate sponsors. Discussions were ongoing between Commonwealth Games Scotland, the Scottish Government, and EventScotland, with an official bid expected by the end of the month, though one was not submitted at that time. On 25 July 2024, it was reported by the BBC that a decision on hosting would be made in August. By 11 August 2024, speculation grew that Glasgow had reached an agreement to take on the hosting rights, and on 30 August 2024, the Commonwealth Games Council for Scotland issued a statement outlining a compact Games concept featuring 10 sports across four venues, including Scotstoun Stadium and Tollcross International Swimming Centre. Finally, on 17 September 2024, it was confirmed that the Scottish Government had agreed to host the Games, with financial support from Commonwealth Games Australia.

=== Explored bids ===
- Ghana

Accra
On 8 April 2024, the Commonwealth Games Federation announced that a new host for the 2026 Games was likely to be announced the following month, and the next day, the Ghana Minister for Youth and Sports Mustapha Ussif confirmed the country's interest in hosting the 2026 Commonwealth Games after the capital, Accra, successfully hosted the 2023 African Games in March 2024.

- England

London
Mayor of London, Sadiq Khan said that London, "would be ready" to bid for the 2026 Games if needed.

British Prime Minister, Rishi Sunak said that they would wait for initial discussions from the organisers to conclude before encouraging any of the countries of the United Kingdom to bid. Former Premier of Queensland, Peter Beattie, who oversaw the 2018 Commonwealth Games on the Gold Coast as the chairman, stated that returning the Games to the United Kingdom would be the only realistic option in saving the 2026 Games, citing Glasgow and Birmingham as potential hosts due to their experience in hosting the 2014 and 2022 editions respectively.

In March 2024, the London Mayor, Sadiq Khan reiterated his backing for the capital to host the games and “stands ready” to step in, but the decision would need to be taken by the Government. London had previously hosted the 2012 Summer Olympics and Paralympics.

=== Cancelled potential bids ===
==== Europe ====
- England

Birmingham
Conservative MP Michael Fabricant called for Birmingham, who had hosted the Games in 2022, to host once again. Mayor of the West Midlands, Andy Street, who oversaw the 2022 Games stated that he would be happy to see the games return to the UK again. The Conservative group at Birmingham City Council called for the Commonwealth Games to be permanently based in the city. However the administration confirmed that Birmingham was not "games-ready" to host in 2026 as the athletes village was already being converted into housing, and stated that "it's now someone else's turn to stage this amazing event".

- Wales

The Welsh Conservatives called for the Welsh Government to bid for the 2026 Games citing that the games would bring "immense benefits" to the country but the proposal was rejected due to budget conflicts with the UK Government.

==== Asia ====
- India

Ahmedabad or Bhubaneswar
Ahmedabad has been considered as a potential location to host the 2026 Games. Sources reported that the Government of Gujarat said that the city would likely bid if given approval by the Government of India. Ahmedabad is also planning a bid to host the 2036 Summer Olympics and Paralympics, with the Government of Gujarat stating that the venues proposed for the 2036 Games would be ready for 2026. However, it was later confirmed that the state was focused more on bidding for the 2036 Summer Olympics and Paralympics. India hosted the 2010 Commonwealth Games in Delhi.
Bhubaneswar, the capital of Odisha was considered a potential host city for hosting the 2026 Commonwealth Games. The city, renowned for its robust sports infrastructure, has successfully hosted several major international events, including the 2018 FIH Men's Hockey World Cup, 2022 FIFA U-17 Women's World Cup, as well as the 2023 Men's FIH Hockey World Cup. It has also hosted 2017 Asian Athletics Championships. Indian Olympic Association (IOA) President Narinder Batra expressed ambition for Bhubaneswar to become a key venue for international sporting events, highlighting the city's readiness and capabilities. Odisha Sports Minister Vishal Dev also noted that Bhubaneswar could be a prominent city for hosting the Olympics, should India win the bid, reflecting the state's aspiration to be a leading sports hub. Bhubaneswar continues to strive for opportunities to host significant global sports events, underscoring its role as a major player in the international sports arena.

- Malaysia

On 11 March 2024, the Olympic Council of Malaysia released a statement saying that Malaysia has been offered the opportunity by the CGF to replace Victoria, Australia, as the host of the 2026 Commonwealth Games. On 22 March 2024, the Cabinet of Malaysia decided to decline the invitation after studying the matter from all aspects, including costs and other implications. Additionally, the Federal Government of Malaysia would not want to use taxpayers money to fund the games, as well as the potential of these games, if delayed to 2027, to clash with the 2027 SEA Games, which are also scheduled to be held in Malaysia.

- Singapore

On 14 March 2024, it was announced by Commonwealth Games Singapore and Sport Singapore that Singapore is currently assessing the feasibility to host the games after it was invited by the CGF to do so.
A joint statement on Wednesday (3 April) by Sport Singapore and the Commonwealth Games Singapore said that the two sports bodies "have studied the feasibility of hosting the 2026 Commonwealth Games, and have decided not to make any bid to host the Games".

==== Oceania ====
- Australia

Following the withdrawal of Victoria's bid, all Australian state and territory leaders ruled out hosting the Games due to the high expected costs and short timeframe.
Adelaide
The South Australian Government said it had examined hosting the Games in Adelaide, but concluded it would cost $3.5 billion with only $1.2 billion in benefits.
Perth
Perth Lord Mayor Basil Zempilas called for Perth to host the Games, however this was immediately ruled out by the Premier of Western Australia.
Hobart
In February 2022, Premier of Tasmania Peter Gutwein submitted a formal expression of interest for the state to host the Games, with Hobart as the hub. A government briefing note on the proposal acknowledged that the state lacked the required international-standard sporting facilities and a suitable venue for opening and closing ceremonies. The bid was unsuccessful, with the Games subsequently being awarded to regional Victoria in April 2022.
Gold Coast
After all Australian state and territory leaders ruled out hosting the Games due to the high expected costs and short timeframe Gold Coast Mayor Tom Tate said the city is prepared to host the 2026 Commonwealth Games — as long as the federal government redirects funding. Tate said he would also want support from the state government, however in December 2023, it was announced that Gold Coast would withdraw its bid.

- New Zealand

Christchurch
The Mayor of Christchurch, Phil Mauger said that Christchurch should "push in" and host the event. However the New Zealand Olympic Committee said that they had no intention in putting a bid in for New Zealand and would rather wait for the 2034 Games.

== First selection ==
Bids for the 2026 Commonwealth Games
Overview
- XXIII Commonwealth Games
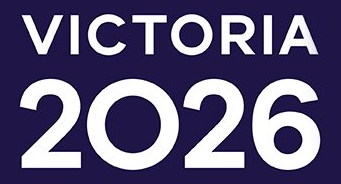
- Winner: Victoria

Details
- Committee: Commonwealth Games Australia

Previous Games hosted

Decision
- Result: Victoria (unanimous)

=== Bidding calendar ===
During the CGF General Assembly on 31 March 2017 in Gold Coast, after the troubled 2022 Commonwealth Games host city bid process, the executive board announced that it had planned to award both 2026 and 2030 Commonwealth Games simultaneously at the CGF General Assembly scheduled for Kigali, Rwanda in September 2019. A new model called CGF Partnerships (CGFP) was implemented. This aims to give stronger support to the associations and cities that show interests in hosting future Games, and enhance the overall value of the event. This is similar to the process used by the International Olympic Committee (IOC) since 2017.

Bidding process of the 2026 and 2030 Commonwealth Games
Express interest (launched in April 2018)	Commitment to bid (2020)		CGF General Assembly (2021)
Dialogue phase: Frame opportunity; Understand impact; Stakeholder initial engagement	Feasibility phase: Develop games concept; Test feasibility; Align stakeholders	Candidature phase: Finalise games concept plan; Develop candidate file; Secure guarantees and funding	Evaluation of the bids

=== Winner ===
Region	Country	Commonwealth Games Committee	Result
Victoria	Australia	Commonwealth Games Australia	Winner
Further information: Victoria bid for the 2026 Commonwealth Games In January 2022 the Victorian State Government announced it was giving serious consideration to a late request from the CGF to host the Games. On 16 February 2022, Premier of Victoria Daniel Andrews confirmed that the state was in exclusive negotiations with the CGF to host the Games. If successful in seeking to host the Games a second time, a Victorian bid would aim to emphasise the state's regional centres – such as Geelong, Ballarat and Bendigo – as opposed to being predominantly Melbourne-based, such as in 2006. Bendigo had hosted the 2004 Commonwealth Youth Games. Acceptance of the bid will likely also be conditional upon agreement on ways to control costs, such as housing athletes and officials in hotels rather than a dedicated village. This bid was confirmed as successful on 12 April 2022.

=== Attempted bids ===
==== Asia ====
- India

Rajeev Mehta, Secretary General of the Indian Olympic Association (IOA) announced that they are willing to host the 2026 Games. He said at a press conference in the presence of Dame Louise Martin, President of the CGF and David Grevemberg, CEO of the CGF. Mehta said that they will first take approval from the executive board and general assembly of IOA and then will approach government. He further added that they will prepare the bid if the Government of India allows them to host the Games. The IOA would decide on whether it should approach the government for a bid to host the 2026 Commonwealth Games in its annual general meeting on 30 December 2019. The IOA officials confirmed on 30 December 2019 that they will bid for the 2026 or 2030 Games. India hosted the 2010 Commonwealth Games in its capital city Delhi.

- Shah Alam, Malaysia

On 27 August 2019, Amirudin Shari, Menteri Besar of Selangor announced that Selangor's capital Shah Alam could be the host of 2026 Commonwealth Games. Olympic Council of Malaysia president Datuk Seri Mohamad Norza Zakaria supported the decision of the bid. Malaysia hosted the Commonwealth Games in 1998 in its capital city Kuala Lumpur.

- Sri Lanka

It was reported in November 2020, that the National Olympic Committee of Sri Lanka was preparing a bid to present to the government for review. The country bid for the 2018 Commonwealth Games with coastal town Hambantota.

==== North America ====
- Victoria, Canada

On 17 February 2021, David Black, who was behind Victoria's bid for the 1994 Commonwealth Games, announced that the city was preparing a bid for the event. The city hosted the 1994 Games, and had bid for the 2022 Games.

==== Oceania ====
- Australia

Sydney
In May 2018, Chief Executive of Commonwealth Games Australia (CGA) Craig Philips wrote to the states seeking expressions of interest to host the 2026 or 2030 Games. New South Wales Opposition Leader Luke Foley said that Sydney should make a bid to host the 2026 Commonwealth Games because it would fast-track the construction of transportation system and affordable housing in the region and also the city already has the sporting facilities as it hosted the 2000 Summer Olympics, Paralympics and also the Gay Games two years later. The New South Wales Minister for Sport Stuart Ayres informed that they aren't interested to host the 2026 Commonwealth Games in Sydney because the Government of New South Wales want to focus on world cups. Despite this, it was reported in August 2021 that the Government of New South Wales were in talks with the CGA regarding hosting the 2026 Games. Sydney hosted the 1938 British Empire Games.
Perth
The city of Perth, which hosted the 1962 Commonwealth Games, had a review into infrastructure needed. After rebuilding the Perth Stadium, a 60,000-seat stadium, the West Australian capital had been urged to bid. An audit of the city's sporting facilities was commissioned to determine what infrastructure upgrades would be needed to host the event. However, on 30 December 2018, it was announced that the 2026 Commonwealth Games bid was to be abandoned as too costly and the city would instead bid for the 2029 World Athletics Championships. In late September 2021, Perth Lord Mayor Basil Zempilas revived the idea of hosting the 2026 Games.
Hobart and Launceston
On 10 February 2022, Premier of Tasmania Peter Gutwein and Minister for Sport Jane Howlett expressed a desire for Tasmania to host the Games. Howlett said that the state government would be open to either hosting the games in its own right or even as a co-host. The desire by the state to host the Commonwealth Games comes from the back of major events such as Bellerive Oval playing host to the fifth test of the 2021-22 Ashes series and the refurbishment of the Derwent Entertainment Centre.

=== Cancelled potential bids ===
==== Asia ====
- Kuala Lumpur, Malaysia

Olympic Council of Malaysia President Tunku Imran has revealed the CGF inspection visit of Kuala Lumpur is as much about assessing the city's capability for hosting the 2026 event as 2022. Imran suggested that Kuala Lumpur would be willing to wait to enter the race for the 2026 event instead of staging it in 2022. The city staged the 1998 Commonwealth Games as well as the 2001 and the 2017 Southeast Asian Games. On 22 April 2018, Tunku Imran said Malaysia is capable of hosting 2026 Commonwealth Games, however, it is up to the new government to decide whether to bid for it or not. However, on 2 July 2018, Tunku Imran has stated that Malaysia is not ready to host the 2026 Commonwealth Games, stating that hosting the quadrennial games has become relatively expensive for many countries.

==== Europe ====
- England

Liverpool
Liverpool was planning to bid for the 2026 games, but only if funding was available from the UK Government. Mayor Joe Anderson argued that Liverpool could use the Games as ‘a catalyst for regeneration’ across the city region if successful. Anderson also suggested that the proposed Bramley-Moore Dock Stadium could play a key part in a Commonwealth Games bid. Liverpool put in a bid for the 2022 Commonwealth Games but lost out to Birmingham, and given that Birmingham hosted 2022, it was assumed at least until Victoria pulled out that the subsequent 2026 Games would not be held in England.
Birmingham
Birmingham was planning to bid for the 2026 games. City MPs, sports stars including Olympic medallists Mark Lewis-Francis and Katharine Merry, and Prime Minister at the time David Cameron expressed support for the Birmingham bid. The Alexander Stadium, Villa Park, Edgbaston and the Arena Birmingham were to be the bidding venues. Birmingham successfully bid for the 2022 Commonwealth Games.

- Cardiff, Wales

Cardiff was interested in bidding for the 2022 games, with some events to be held in Newport and Swansea, however Cardiff Council announced they were instead in discussions for a bid for the 2026 games. On 26 July 2016 it was announced that Cardiff would not look to host the Commonwealth Games in 2026. Media reports stated this was due to the uncertain situation regarding Brexit and funding concerns. On 27 May 2017 it was announced that the Welsh Government were in "discussions", and considering a joint bid with Birmingham or Liverpool to host the 2022 Commonwealth Games, following Durban's rights to host the event being stripped due to financial difficulties. Wales mainly sought to host outdoor events such as the triathlon, rowing or the cycling road race in the 2022 games, however, the rights were ultimately awarded solely to Birmingham on 21 December 2017.

==== Americas and Caribbean ====
- Canada

Edmonton
Edmonton is Canada's fifth-largest metropolitan region and the second-largest city in, as well as the capital of, the Province of Alberta. It is home to a number of professional sports associations (most notably the Edmonton Elks (CFL) football team, the Edmonton Oilers (NHL) ice hockey team and FC Edmonton (CPL) association football club). The 1978 Commonwealth Games, the 1983 Summer Universiade and the 2001 World Championships in Athletics were all held in Edmonton, and the city has also hosted some matches of the 2006 Women's Rugby World Cup, the 2007 FIFA U-20 World Cup, the 2014 FIFA U-20 Women's World Cup and the 2015 FIFA Women's World Cup. There are plans to build a new velodrome to replace the ageing Argyll Velodrome. The ageing Northlands Coliseum was replaced as the city's main indoor venue by the new Rogers Place in 2016. Edmonton initially planned to bid for the 2022 Games but on 11 February 2015, Edmonton announced it was withdrawing its bid to host the 2022 Commonwealth Games, citing financial reasons and a global fall in oil prices. The bid team said they would instead focus on the 2026 games. Edmonton confirmed in 2019 it would not pursue its Commonwealth Games bid due to, among other concerns, prior commitments to the 2026 FIFA World Cup. In addition, Canada would likely prefer to bid for the 2030 games as it would coincide with the 100th anniversary of the first Commonwealth Games held in Hamilton, Ontario, Canada.
Calgary
Mayor of Calgary Naheed Nenshi announced on 14 January 2020 that a group of private citizens is preparing a serious bid to host the Games. In 2018, the Calgary City Council announced they were planning to bid for the 2026 Winter Olympics, but the citizens of Calgary voted down the idea in a municipal plebiscite and the bid was abandoned. Nenshi said that some of the data from the 2026 Winter Olympics bid will be used in preparing the 2026 Commonwealth Games bid. The CSC announced that Calgary is not bidding for the Games as the bidding group was unable to secure sufficient funding from the Alberta Government and Municipal Government.

Hamilton
Hamilton had originally planned to bid for the 2026 edition of the Commonwealth Games but in April 2021, the spokesperson and chair for the Hamilton bid Lou Frapporti announced that Hamilton would scrap its bid for the 2026 edition and instead focus on the 2030 edition instead. Frapporti stated that the reason for dropping the bid was because the province was unlikely to support the 2026 bid and the unlikelihood of the games federation allowing for a move to 2027 as well.

==== Oceania ====
- Adelaide, Australia

It was reported on 12 September 2018 that representatives of CGF visited Adelaide and toured potential venues as the city was considering a bid for the 2026 Games. Potential venues included the Adelaide Oval for athletics and the opening and closing ceremonies, the Adelaide Convention Centre for table tennis, weightlifting, volleyball, gymnastics, boxing and wrestling events, with Coopers Stadium and Adelaide Entertainment Centre in Hindmarsh for rugby sevens and swimming events respectively. Priceline Stadium in Mile End was proposed for hosting Netball, the SuperDrome in Gepps Cross for track cycling, the South Australia Aquatic and Leisure Centre in Marion for the diving events. It was suggested that a future Athletes' Village be built within the Adelaide CBD. However, on 18 September 2019 Adelaide withdrew its Commonwealth Games bid citing the high cost and a lack of key sporting infrastructure.

- New Zealand

Auckland
The events arm of Auckland Council has raised the possibility of a bid to host the Commonwealth Games, possibly as early as 2026. Key figures have backed the idea, saying New Zealand needs to take its turn at hosting the Games, which were last there in Auckland in 1990. Auckland also hosted the 2017 World Masters Games. World Masters Games chief executive Jennah Wootten also expressed her hope that New Zealand will investigate the possibility of staging the 2026 Commonwealth Games.

Christchurch
In the 2017 General Election, Councillor Raf Manji ran as an independent candidate for the electorate of Ilam. As a major part of his campaign he promoted the idea of having Christchurch host the 2026 Commonwealth Games. He envisioned Christchurch to host the games with new facilities yet to be built: these would include a large scale stadium and a metro sports facility, replacing those damaged and demolished following the 2011 Christchurch earthquake. Councillor Manji believed it would provide an opportunity for the city to incorporate large scale investment into a promotional sporting event. Raf Manji garnered 22.8% of the electorates vote but lost to incumbent Gerry Brownlee. There has been much public support for the hosting of the games in Christchurch, with articles being published in local papers and at least one submission being made to the Christchurch City Council, prior to Councillor Raf Manji's election campaign. Much of this support has come from people who remember the 1974 Commonwealth Games held in the city, the games were very popular and were deemed by many as a rare success of such a large sporting event.
