= Durban bid for the 2022 Commonwealth Games =

- Logo of Durban's 2022 Commonwealth Games bid
- Host city: Durban, South Africa
- Motto: Ready To Inspire
- Opening: 18 July
- Closing: 31 July
- Main venue: Moses Mabhida Stadium

The Durban bid for the 2022 Commonwealth Games was a successful 2015 bid by Durban, South Africa and South African Sports Confederation and Olympic Committee (SASCOC) to host the 2022 Commonwealth Games. In March 2017 the hosting rights were withdrawn from Durban due to an inability to meet financial requirements, and awarded instead to Birmingham in December 2017.

== Bid ==
The coastal South African city had previously considered bidding for the 2020 or 2024 Summer Olympics. If Durban had hosted the games, it would have been the first Commonwealth Games held on the African continent. South Africa's second largest city, Cape Town bid for the 2004 Summer Olympics, but lost out to Athens.

The city of Durban, South Africa was elected as the host for the 2022 Commonwealth Games on 2 September 2015, at a General Assembly in Auckland, New Zealand. It was reported in February 2017 however, Durban may be unable to host the games due to financial constraints. On 13 March 2017, the Commonwealth Games Federation (CGF) stripped Durban of their rights to host.

== Venues ==
Moses Mabhida Stadium

The following were the proposed venues for the games:

Venue	Sports	Capacity	Type
Moses Mabhida Stadium	Athletics, Opening Ceremony, Closing Ceremony	56,000	Existing
Kings Park Stadium	Rugby sevens	55,000	Existing
Kings Park Aquatic Centre	Swimming, Diving	5,000	Existing
Queensmead Hockey Stadium	Hockey	5,000	Existing
Durban International Convention Centre	Badminton, Boxing, Judo, Weightlifting, Wrestling	3,000	Existing
Collegians Bowls Club	Lawn Bowls	2,500	Existing
Durban Exhibition Centre	Table tennis, Netball	2,500	Existing
University of KwaZulu-Natal	Squash, 3x3 basketball	2,500	Existing
Durban New Beach	Beach volleyball	TBD	Temporary
uShaka Marine World	Triathlon	TBD	Temporary
Bluff Shooting Range	Shooting	TBD	Temporary
Port of Durban & M4	Road cycling	TBD	Temporary
Venues outside of Durban
Pietermaritzburg	Mountain biking, Track cycling	TBD	Existing/Temporary

== See also ==
- Victoria bid for the 2026 Commonwealth Games
