= Glasgow bid for the 2026 Commonwealth Games =

- Host city: Glasgow, Scotland
- Nations: 74
- Events: 10
- Main venue: The Hydro

The Glasgow bid for the 2026 Commonwealth Games was a bid by Glasgow and Commonwealth Games Scotland to host the 2026 Commonwealth Games, following Victoria's withdrawal of hosting the games. On 17 September 2024, it was announced that the bid had been successful, and it was officially approved on 22 October 2024.

== History ==
=== Background ===
In the lead-up to Glasgow's bid for the 2026 Commonwealth Games, the process of selecting a host for the event had been marked by uncertainty and upheaval. Following the troubled 2022 bid, which saw the South African city of Durban stripped of hosting rights, the Commonwealth Games Federation (CGF) implemented a new strategy aimed at supporting potential hosts and securing future Games. Initially, the CGF intended to award both the 2026 and 2030 Games simultaneously, but no firm decision on the 2026 host was made between 2019 and 2022. After Victoria, Australia, was confirmed as the 2026 host, the state government unexpectedly withdrew from the role in July 2023, citing soaring costs. This prompted a renewed search for a replacement host city, creating an opportunity for Glasgow to enter the bidding process.

=== Bid process ===
On 11 April 2024, it was announced that Glasgow was being considered as a "last possibility" to host the 2026 Games in the event, if no other host was forthcoming, in an alternative to safeguard the Games. It was reported that the Games would be in a smaller scale and could reuse venues from the 2014 Commonwealth Games. Accommodation for the athletes would comprise hotels, and possibly a combination of Glasgow Caledonian University and University of Glasgow residences. Furthermore, the costs of the Games would be covered fully by the Commonwealth Games Federation and other corporate sponsors. Discussions were ongoing between Commonwealth Games Scotland, the Scottish Government, and EventScotland with a confirmed bid expected by the end of the month. However, a bid would not end up being submitted at that time. On 25 July 2024, BBC reported that a decision would be made in August.

On 11 August 2024, it was speculated that an agreement was reached for Glasgow to take over the hosting rights of the games. A statement from the Commonwealth Games Council for Scotland issued on 30 August 2024, suggested a compact games concept with ten sports across four venues including the Scotstoun Stadium and the Tollcross International Swimming Centre.

=== Announcement ===
On 17 September 2024, Glasgow was announced as the host city for the games following a successful bid backed by the Scottish government. The event, scheduled to be a scaled-down version compared to previous Games, will feature fewer sports and athletes than the 2014 edition. The Australian state of Victoria had initially been selected to host the Games but withdrew in 2023 due to rising costs. After securing assurances from Australian authorities, including a multi-million pound investment, Scottish Health and Sport Minister Neil Gray confirmed that Glasgow would step in to host. The event will feature ten sports across four venues in the city, with athletics and swimming confirmed for Scotstoun Stadium and Tollcross International Swimming Centre. The final details, including additional venues and dates, are yet to be confirmed. Gray described the announcement as a testament to Glasgow's reputation for hosting international events and emphasised that the Games would be delivered without public funding. Contracts and other related material to confirm Glasgow's hosting of the games are expected to be signed in the weeks following.

== Proposals ==
The proposals for the 2026 Commonwealth Games in Glasgow reflect a streamlined, cost-effective approach while maintaining high standards of competition.

=== Venues ===
A key feature of the event will be the use of existing venues, ensuring minimal additional infrastructure costs. Athletics is set to take place at Scotstoun Stadium, while the Tollcross International Swimming Centre will host swimming and diving. The Commonwealth Arena and the Sir Chris Hoy Velodrome are slated for cycling events. Additionally, the Scottish Event Campus (SEC) expressed interest in their venues, including the SEC Armadillo, SEC Centre, and The Hydro, to be used during the games.

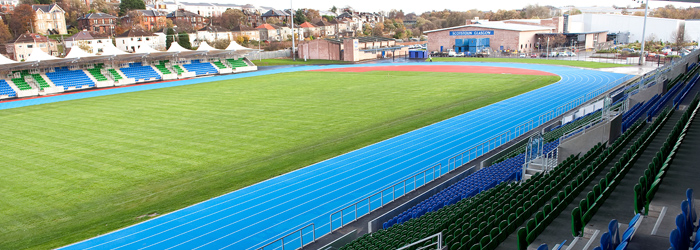
Scotstoun Stadium

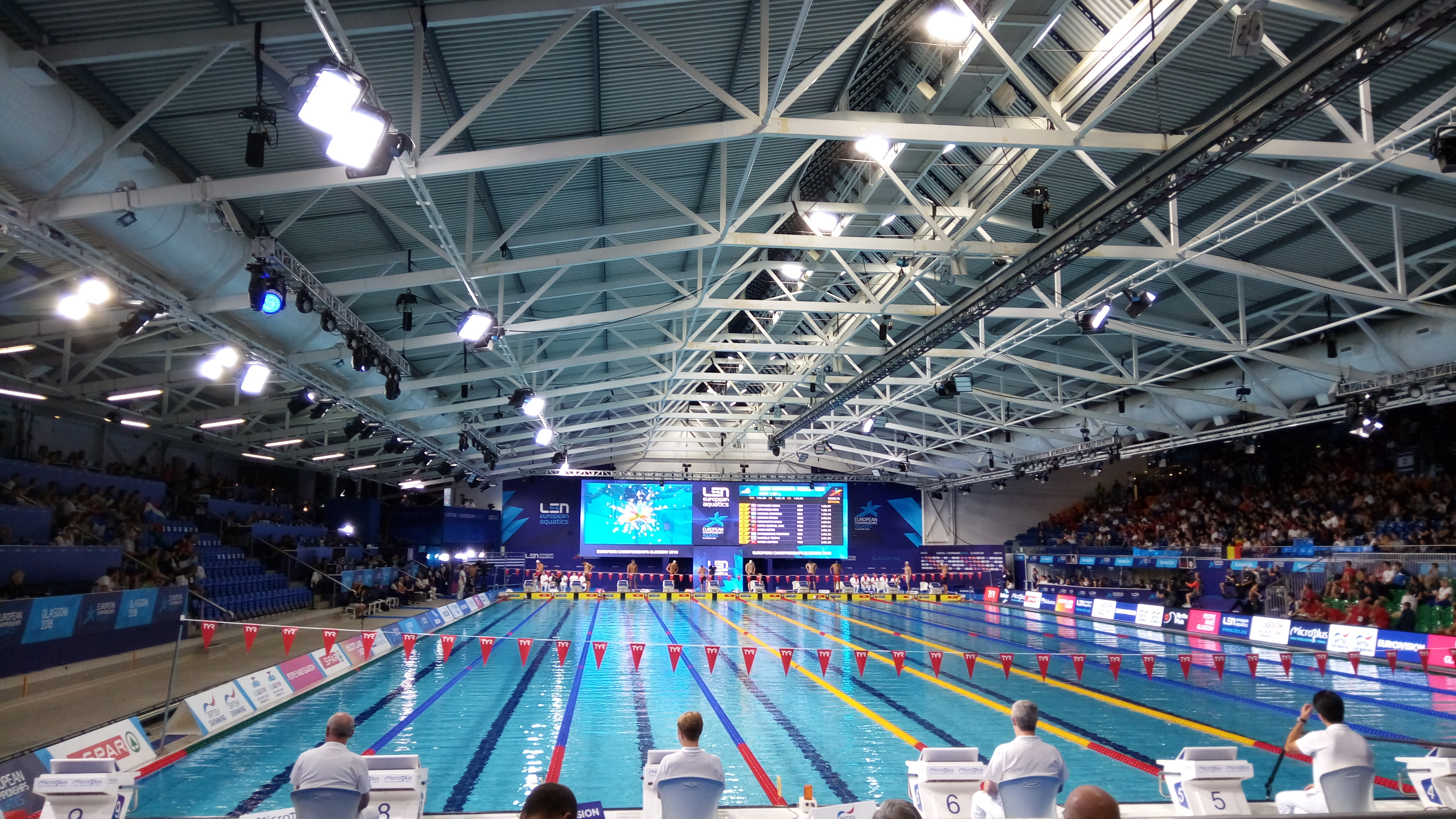
Tollcross International Swimming Centre

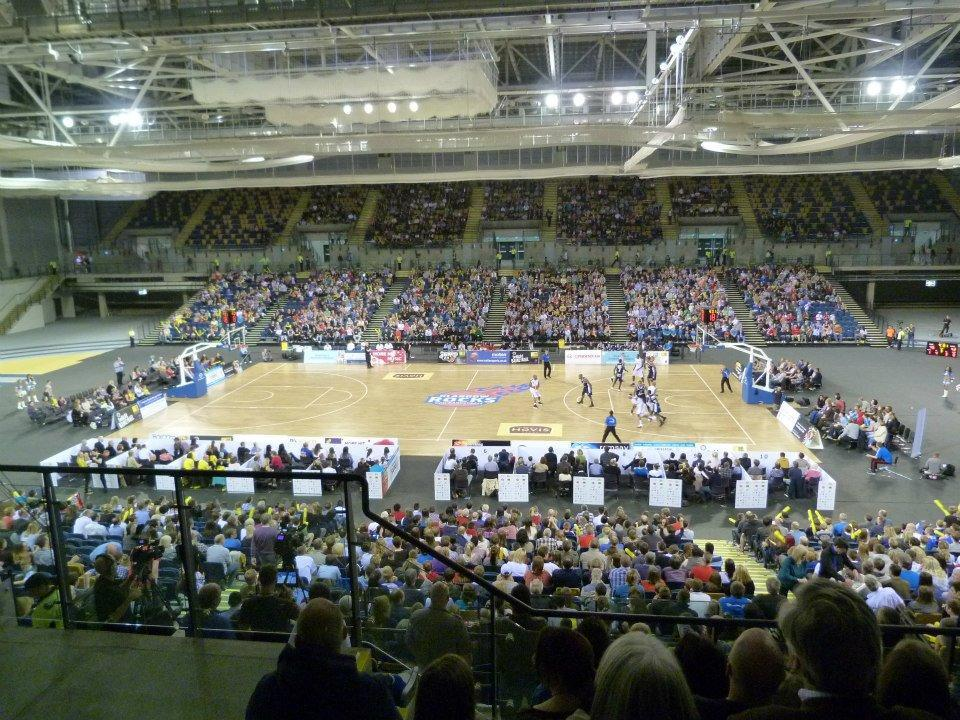
Commonwealth Arena

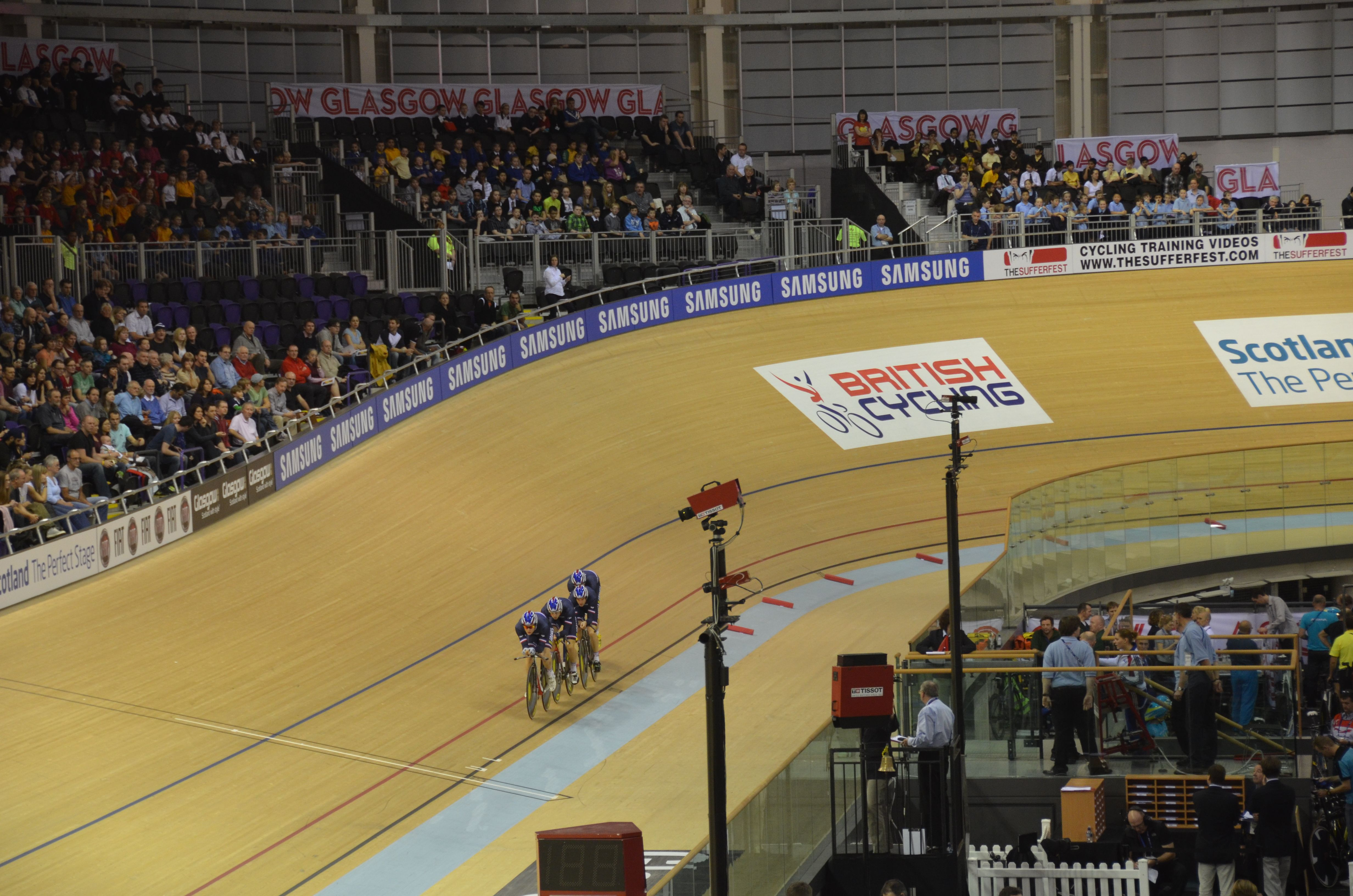
Sir Chris Hoy Velodrome

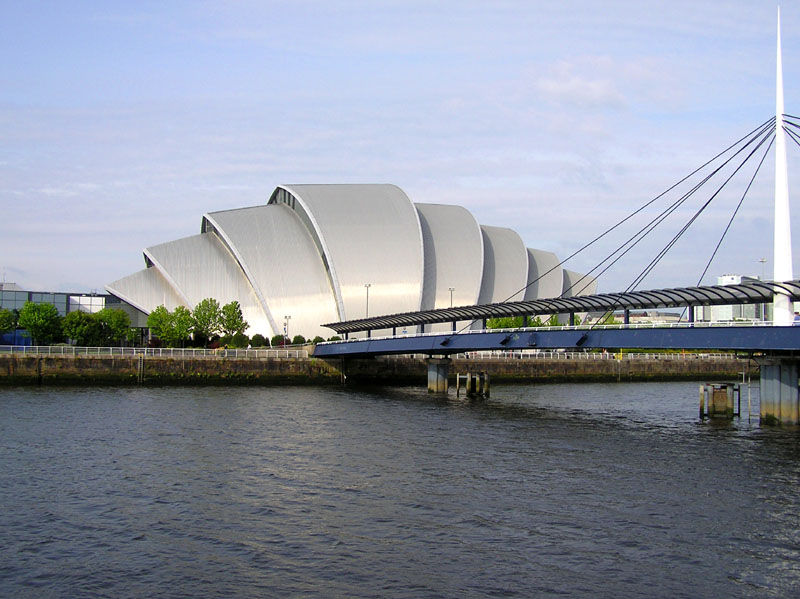
SEC Armadillo

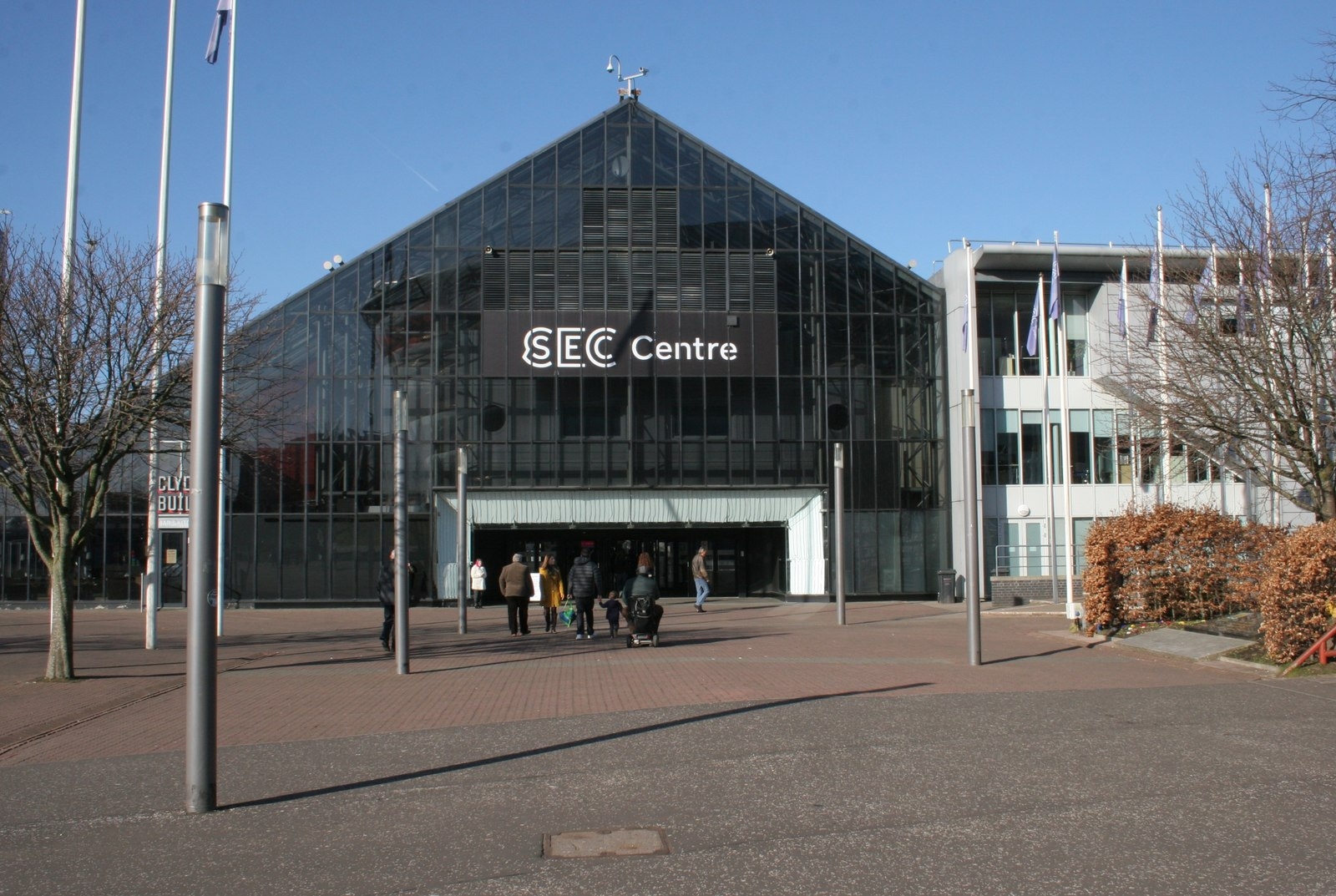
SEC Centre

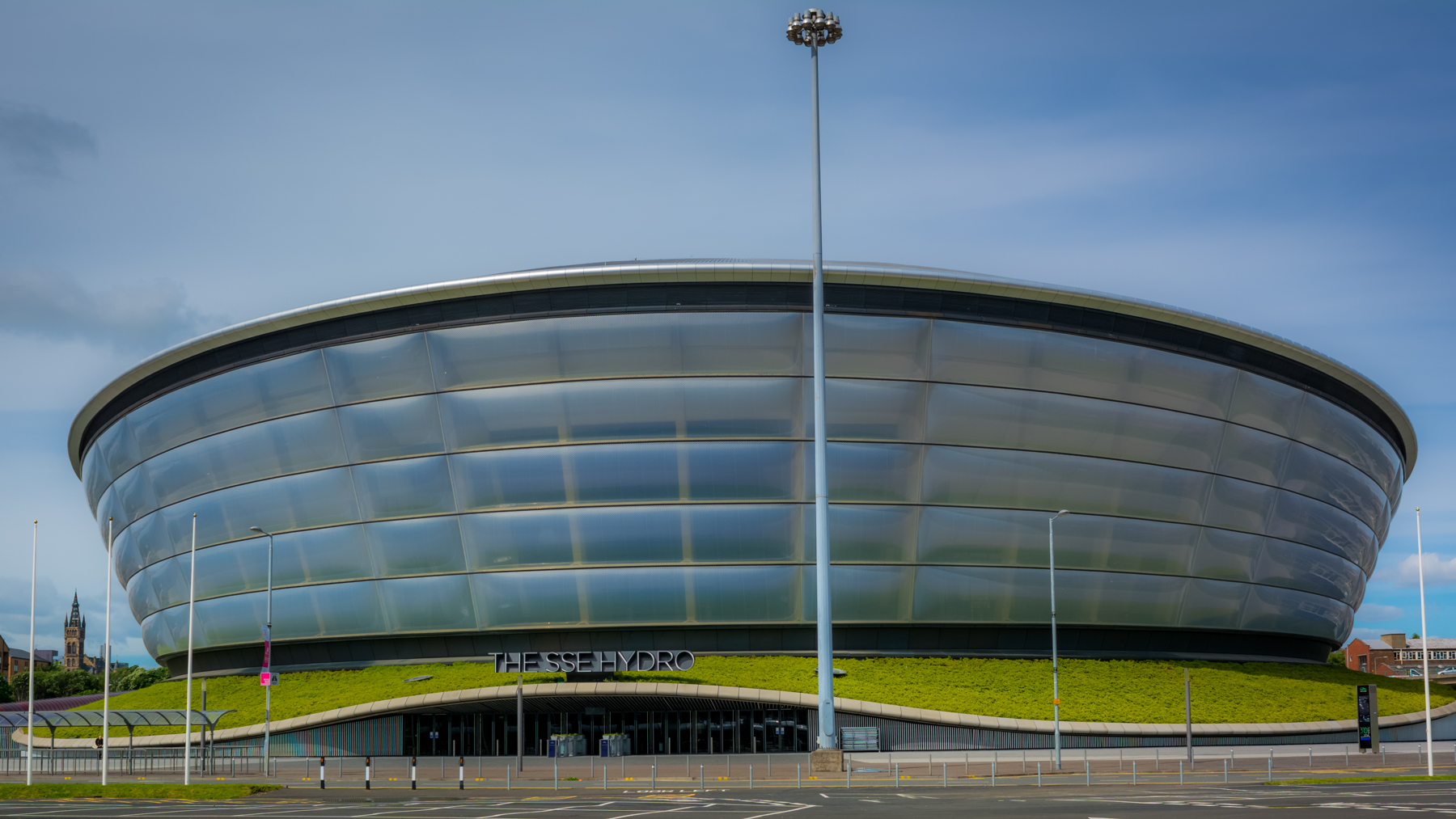
The Hydro

=== Opening and closing ceremonies ===
In line with the emphasis on a more sustainable and accessible Games, the opening and closing ceremonies are expected to be scaled back compared to previous editions. While the specific venue for these ceremonies has not yet been confirmed, Scotstoun Stadium is being considered as a potential host. This proposal aligns with the commitment to delivering a high-quality yet financially responsible event, with a focus on utilising Glasgow's world-class facilities to showcase the city once again on the global stage.

== Reaction ==
The announcement of Glasgow's selection as the host for the 2026 Commonwealth Games was met with mixed reaction.

Commonwealth Games Federation (CGF) president Chris Jenkins called the Glasgow Games a significant step in reimagining the Commonwealth Games, with a focus on sustainability and cost efficiency. Ian Reid, chairman of Commonwealth Games Scotland, highlighted Glasgow's readiness, pointing to its world-class facilities and experienced workforce.

Scottish athletes also reacted to the news. Former 1500m world champion Jake Wightman highlighted how important it is for athletes to compete in front of a home crowd, calling the opportunity to give back to Scotland “one of the saddest things” that would be lost if the Games ceased to exist. Eilish McColgan, a gold medallist at the 2022 Birmingham Games, fondly recalled the 2014 edition in Glasgow, saying she felt proud to be Scottish and praised the city's welcoming atmosphere. Kirsty Gilmour, a two-time badminton medallist, echoed this sentiment, stating that competing in a second home Games would be a rare and incredible experience, with the backing of local crowds adding to the athletes’ motivation.

Olympic track cyclist Neah Evans shared a more personal connection to the Glasgow Games, revealing that the 2014 edition inspired her to take up cycling after trying it in the city's velodrome. She expressed hope that the return of the Commonwealth Games could inspire the next generation of athletes in the same way.

=== Political reactions ===
Scottish First Minister John Swinney stated that he was "very pleased" that it was agreed that Glasgow would host the games. He stressed that although it will be scaled back compared to 2014, the 2026 games will be a celebration of sporting achievement. Scottish Labour leader Anas Sarwar said that Glasgow hosting the 2026 games was "a no brainer" and expressed his delight at the city having the opportunity to host the games again, however he said that it must deliver an ever-lasting change for Glasgow and Scotland after expressing his belief that the city had been "badly let down". Scottish Conservative leader Douglas Ross said that it was "fantastic news" that the city would host again.

Neil Gray, Health and Sport Minister, praised the decision as a recognition of Scotland's strong track record in hosting major international sporting events. He expressed confidence that Glasgow would once again rise to the occasion, providing a platform for world-class athletes. Scottish Secretary Ian Murray stated that it was "certainly great news" that Glasgow stepped in as host, and reiterated the UK Government's support for the games, as well as reiterating the £2 million pledge to help fund the security during the games.

Local leaders, including Glasgow City Council leader Susan Aitken, echoed these sentiments, framing the Games as an opportunity for economic renewal and increased tourism. Meanwhile, former Team Scotland swimmer Hannah Miley welcomed the news but expressed mixed emotions over the exclusion of some sports in the scaled-back format. Despite some concerns, the overall reaction was one of optimism, with stakeholders seeing the event as a vital boost for both Glasgow and the Commonwealth Games movement.

== See also ==
- 2026 Commonwealth Games
- Victoria bid for the 2026 Commonwealth Games
- Glasgow bid for the 2014 Commonwealth Games
