= Halifax bid for the 2014 Commonwealth Games =

- Logo of Halifax's 2014 Commonwealth Games bid
- Host city: Halifax, Canada

The Halifax bid for the 2014 Commonwealth Games was a withdrawn bid to host the 2014 Commonwealth Games by Halifax Regional Municipality, the capital of the province of Nova Scotia, Canada.

The bid was eventually won by Glasgow (Scotland), who beat Abuja (Nigeria) after a vote of 47 to 24 vote by the Commonwealth Games Federation (CGF) General Assembly on 9 November 2007 in Sri Lanka.

== Background ==
Halifax and Hamilton were both finalists in the selection process to host the 2010 Commonwealth Games. Hamilton won the right to bid for the 2010 Commonwealth Games ahead of Halifax. New Delhi eventually beat Hamilton in the competition to host the games.

Canada has hosted the Commonwealth Games on four previous occasions (Hamilton 1930, Vancouver 1954, Edmonton 1978 and Victoria 1994).

Halifax, Ottawa, York Region, Hamilton and Calgary all submitted proposals and a deposit to Commonwealth Games Association of Canada (CGC) by the deadline of 22 July 2005, in order to be considered as potential hosts of the 2014 Commonwealth Games.

== Selection process ==
=== Selection of bid city for Canada ===
The key dates for the Canadian selection process were as follows:

- August 2005. The Bid City Conference
- 1 November 2005. The deadline for the full bid proposal
- 15 December 2005. The announcement of the Canadian bid city

=== Selection of host city for the 2014 Commonwealth Games ===
The key dates for the Commonwealth Games selection process were as follows:

- 24 February 2006. This was the date when Commonwealth Games Associations / Candidate Cities had to notify the CGF that they intended to bid.
- 10 March 2006. This was the date when Candidate Cities had to pay a non-refundable Candidature Fee of GB£60,000 to the CGF.
- 9 May 2007. The bids were lodged with the CGF on this date, or sooner. Candidate Cities were then allowed to produce an emblem with the Commonwealth Games symbol (The Bar) and also contain terminology which stipulates that the city is a "Candidate City" for the 2014 Commonwealth Games.
- June/July 2007. The CGF Evaluation Committee formally reviewed confirmed bids.
- 9 September 2007. The CGF Evaluation Committee Report was published.
- 9 October 2007. Deadline for any updates by the Candidate Cities in response to the Evaluation Committee Report.
- 9 November 2007. The CGF General Assembly awards the right to host the 2014 Commonwealth Games.

=== The final selection of the Canadian bid ===
A Bid Review Committee (BRC) was established to evaluate each bid city proposal and to recommend a Canadian Candidate Bid City to the CGC.

Only Halifax, Ottawa, York Region and Hamilton actually submitted bid proposals to host the 2014 Commonwealth Games on 1 November 2005. Calgary had by then pulled out of the running. Presentations were held on 13 December 2005 by each bid city to the BRC and two days later Halifax had been chosen to be Canada's bid city for the 2014 Commonwealth Games.

The Halifax 2014 Commonwealth Games Bid Society, also known as "The Bid Society", had been established and had appointed Scott Logan as the chief executive officer and Fred MacGillivray as the chair. They had established a website (www.2014halifax.com/) and had plans and budgets for hosting the Games.

== The withdrawal of the bid ==
The Bid Society and CGC gave an estimate of C$1.6 billion for hosting the games and this figure was presented to the Government of Canada, the Province of Nova Scotia and the Halifax Regional Municipality on 26 January 2007. This figure was considered too high and not realistic, therefore at a meeting of the Bid Society on 7 March 2007, they provided options to reduce the budget from $1.6 billion to $1.3 billion. Without offering precise funding commitment figures, the three levels of government indicated that further reductions were still needed. The CGC and the Bid Society committed themselves to reduce this figure again to funding of approximately $1 billion ($900 million coming from the three levels of government and $100–$200 million from other sponsors such as Sport Canada and from Games revenues). The Government of Canada was committed to contribute up to $396.5 million for Halifax to host the games alone.

Sport Canada commissioned a consultant to evaluate the 2014 business plan and budgets. The "McMahon Report" was delivered to the province and regional governments in draft form without any prior review by the Bid Society or the CGC. This report was very critical of the 2014 plan and budget.

However the Bid Society required more time to present a new financial package to reduce costs down to $1 billion, but the following day on 8 March 2007 the provincial and regional governments decided to withdraw their support, which then ended the Halifax 2014 bid. The CGC would have liked to have put forward another city to represent Canada in the 2014 bid process, but this was not possible as all bidding cities had to register their intent with the CGF a year earlier in 2006. .

Dr. Andrew Pipe, President of CGC, said:

There has been so much passion and optimism around Canada's Bid that it's hard to believe we're out of the competition. There is strong support for our bid across the country and throughout the Commonwealth and I firmly believe we had the team and the plan to win the 2014 Games. But we respect the decision taken today, and wish the two remaining bid cities the best of luck. We would also like to thank all of the Commonwealth Games Associations around the world for their input, their welcome and their support.

It was the first time that Canada had withdrawn a bid for a Commonwealth Games event.

== See also ==
- Bids for the 2014 Commonwealth Games
- Abuja bid for the 2014 Commonwealth Games
- Glasgow bid for the 2014 Commonwealth Games
- Sport in the Halifax Regional Municipality
