= Abuja bid for the 2014 Commonwealth Games =

- Logo of Abuja's 2014 Commonwealth Games bid
- Host city: Abuja, Nigeria
- Motto: All our friends together
- Events: ~250 events in 17 sports
- Opening: 1 October
- Closing: 11 October
- Main venue: National Stadium, Abuja

The Abuja bid for the 2014 Commonwealth Games was an unsuccessful bid to host the 2014 Commonwealth Games by the city of Abuja, Nigeria. The bidding race was won by the Glasgow 2014 bid after a 47–24 vote by the Commonwealth Games Federation (CGF) General Assembly on 9 November 2007 in Sri Lanka.

== Background ==
The former Nigerian leader General Yakubu Gowon was the head of the Abuja 2014 Commonwealth Games bid team, he called for all Nigerians to support the games for the "glory of Nigeria". He suggested that Nigeria would be a prime location for the games because of its unity, serenity, topography and availability of standard sporting facilities. Abuja had recently hosted the All-Africa Games, The African regional version of the olympics, for which it constructed a world-class olympic stadium and games village. It was a hugely successful tournament with more than 7,000 athletes (and larger in size than any Commonwealth Games ever held). The 2014 Commonwealth Games would also be an integral part of national celebration plans for Nigeria's centenary.

The Abuja bid received strong support from African Commonwealth members (which make up the bulk of the Commonwealth) as well as Australia, in what would be the largest multi-sport event to be held thus far on the continent. Despite its number of members, no African country has ever hosted the games and is that last major continent, excluding South America never to have acted as host. The website, www.abuja2014.org simple said "...completing the Commonwealth Games Circle"

An article from Jonathan Clayton of the Times said:

Most of the facilities are already in place, including a modern stadium of a much higher standard than those of many Barclaycard Premiership clubs, and a water-sports complex with a diving pool and an Olympic-size racing pool. There is also a velodrome, hockey pitch with AstroTurf and all-surface tennis courts, restaurants and viewing areas. The facilities, originally built for the 2003 All Africa Games at a cost of £150 million, but possibly much more, are immaculately maintained by a team of dedicated workers.

Abuja airport would be modernised to cater for the sheer capacity of the influx due to the games. This would further boost their bid to host the games. A state of the art light rail transit system was included in the bid documents. The Federal Capital Territory (FCT) administration announced that it had awarded a $841m contract for the construction of the system, which would be completed by 2012.

== Sports ==
The Abuja 2014 Bid Committee issued a list of 17 sports that they planned to host:

- Aquatics (Swimming and Diving)
- Athletics
- Badminton
- Basketball
- Boxing
- Cycling (Road, Mountain and Track)
- Gymnastics (Artistic and Rhythmic)
- Field hockey
- Judo
- Bowls
- Netball
- Rugby sevens
- Shooting
- Squash
- Table Tennis
- Weightlifting
- Wrestling

The Abuja 2014 Commonwealth Games Bid, led by General Yakubu Gowon, submitted the Abuja 2014 Candidature File (Bid Book) on Wednesday, 9 May 2007 to the President of the Commonwealth Games Federation, Michael Fennel, at a ceremony in London where Glasgow also submitted its Candidature File. Members of the Commonwealth Games Federation Executive Board and representatives of the Scotland and Nigeria Communities were also present at the ceremony.

== Evaluation process ==
The Evaluation Commission visited Abuja between 4 and 7 June 2007. The conclusions of the CGF Evaluation Commission were that "The Abuja Bid Committee submitted a Candidate City File which has the substantial and broad backing of the Nigerian Government. The Evaluation Commission submitted a number of issues to be clarified by Abuja and while most of these matters were addressed, a number of matters remain of concern and these are noted in the body of the report...and any decision to award the games to Abuja should be conditional on these matters being addressed"

General Yakubu Gowon, said that his country was also "confident", despite the adverse evaluation of its bid by a four-member team in September. The group's report found fault with the city's plans for budgeting, transport, legacy, marketing and venues. "As far as we are concerned our bid is not only an Abuja bid but an African bid," said General Gowon. "We are going there for a good, good fight, remember I am a general."

== Final selection process ==
"A vote for Abuja means a vote for whole of Africa," appealed Nobel Peace Prize winner Bishop Desmond Tutu to delegates during the final video presentation to delegates before voting began.

== Reaction ==
General Gowon accepted that the Games had been won by "a better presentation" but "The size of the vote for Glasgow was a surprise. We thought we had a very strong case for bringing the Games to Africa for the first time", he went on "It was a friendly battle and we hope we will win next time."

Michael Fennell the CGF President, said:

I hope that Abuja will consider renewing their candidature for the 2018 Games as it is important that the hosting of the Games involves all regions of the Commonwealth and we hope that we will see them in Africa in the not too distant future...The competitive nature of the process has really produced a strong result for everyone involved in the Commonwealth Games movement.

The website simple said "We appreciate, all your efforts, contributions and for believing in us. Abuja2014 Bid Committee"

== See also ==
- 2014 Commonwealth Games bids
- Glasgow 2014 Commonwealth Games bid
- Halifax 2014 Commonwealth Games bid
