= Sport in Halifax, Nova Scotia =

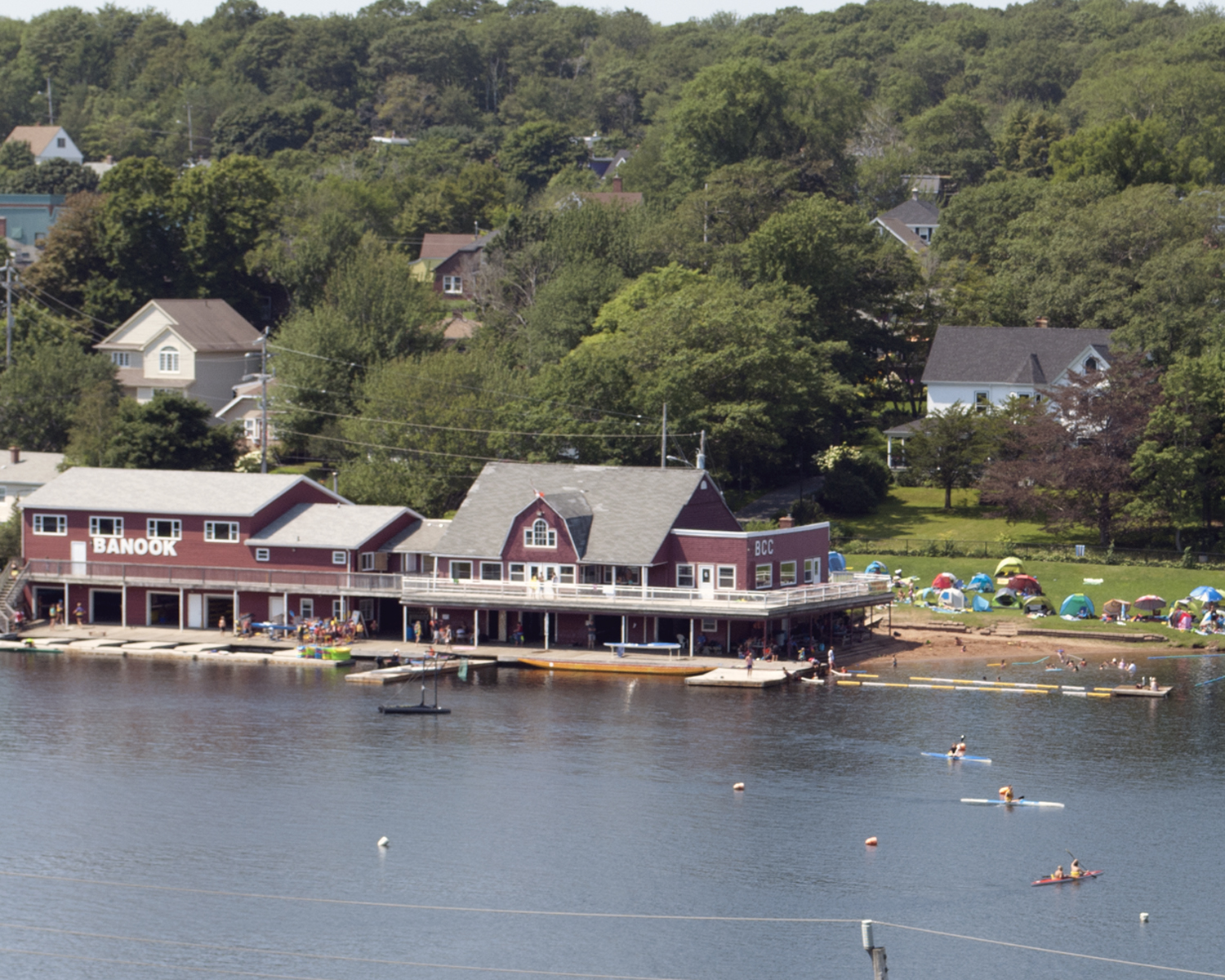
A canoe club on Lake Banook in Dartmouth

Halifax, Nova Scotia, with the largest urban population in Atlantic Canada, is a major sporting centre.

== Community sport ==
The municipal and provincial governments maintain a network of public parks, sports fields, skating arenas, and other facilities throughout urban and rural areas of the municipality. Additionally, many schools in the Halifax Regional School Board and several universities make use of their gymnasiums and sports fields for community use outside of school programs. Ranging from walking trails and provincial parks to tennis courts, swimming pools, shooting ranges and artificial turf soccer fields, Halifax residents have access to virtually every type of sport facility, with organized leagues available throughout the area.

=== Gaelic sports ===
The Gaelic games of Hurling and Gaelic football, governed by the Gaelic Athletic Association, are played in Halifax. The local team is the Halifax Gaels. The team competes in the Eastern Canada GAA division. Beginners are actively encouraged.

=== Paddling ===
The urban core of the Halifax Regional Municipality (HRM) has many sheltered lakes. These lakes provide private paddling clubs with some of the best race courses in Canada, in particular Lake Banook. Lake Banook and all the clubs on the lake hosted World Senior Canoe Kayak Championships in 1997, 2009 and 2023.

- Mic Mac AAC - Lake Banook
- Banook Canoe Club - Lake Banook
- Senobe Canoe Club - Lake Banook
- Abenaki Aquatic Club - Bell Lake
- Cheema Aquatic Club- Lake Charles
- Maskwa Aquatic Club- Kearney Lake
- Orenda Canoe Club - Lake Echo
- Kinap Athletic Club - Porters Lake

=== Sailing ===
The Armdale Yacht Club, Royal Nova Scotia Yacht Squadron, Dartmouth Yacht Club and Bedford Yacht Club provide organized sailing competitions on a daily or weekly basis throughout the summer sailing season. St. Margarets Bay in the western part of the municipality, along with areas of the Eastern Shore, provide additional support to sailing sport enthusiasts.

=== Swimming ===
The city hosts two of the four 50 metre swimming pools in Atlantic Canada: Centennial Pool, built for the 1969 Canada Games, and the pool at Dalhousie University. Smaller 25-metre pools exist at the Dartmouth Sportsplex, the Canada Games Centre, Cole Harbour Place, Captain William Spry Centre, Stadplex, Sackville Sports Stadium, the Waegwoltic Club, and the Shearwater Fitness and Sports Centre. There are also several smaller public pools of about 20 metres length.

The YMCA in the Spring Garden district is being rebuilt and will include a 25-metre competition pool. The facility is set to open in 2017 or 2018.

Several lakes in the city are popular places for swimming in the summer. The city posts lifeguards to the most popular lakes.

== University sport ==
Dalhousie University, St. Mary's University and Mount St. Vincent University all field varsity and intramural teams for sports, enjoyed by members of the public and university communities.

The Saint Mary's Huskies Canadian Interuniversity Sport football team is a popular draw, and play their games at Huskies Stadium. Both Dalhousie and St. Mary's field ice hockey and soccer teams have a fierce rivalry.

== Professional and semi-professional teams ==
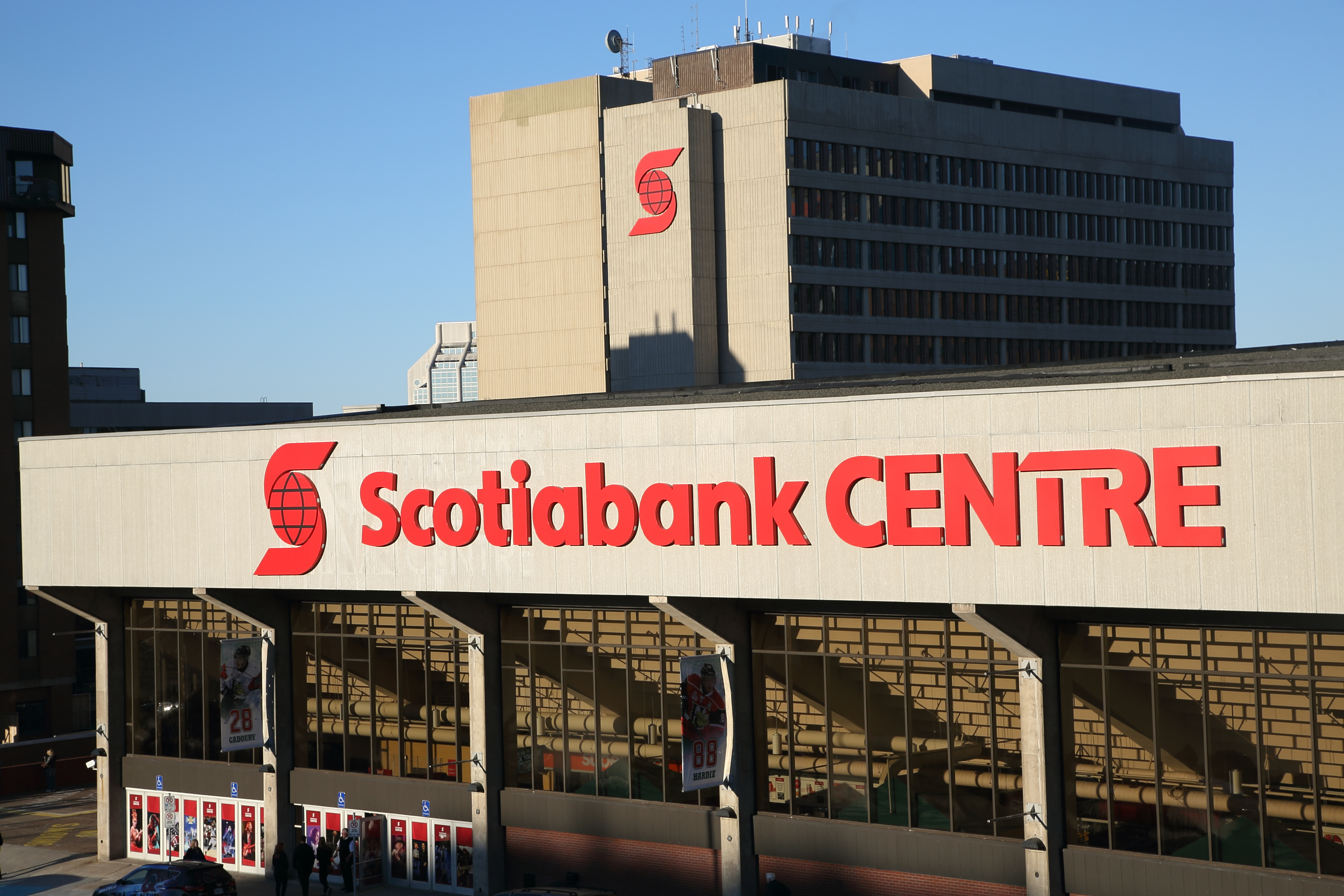
The Scotiabank Centre, the largest indoor arena in Atlantic Canada, is home to the Halifax Mooseheads (hockey).

Hockey teams are the most popular sports draw in Halifax. The Scotiabank Centre is home to the Quebec Maritimes Junior Hockey League's Halifax Mooseheads, who usually lead the league in attendance. The Dartmouth Sportsplex hosts the Metro Marauders Junior-A team.

The Halifax Wanderers are a professional soccer team playing in the Canadian Premier League.

On August 24, 2006 it was announced Halifax would receive an American Basketball Association team. The team was known as the Rainmen. After one year in the ABA, the Rainmen left the league and joined the Premier Basketball League. From 2011 they played in the National Basketball League of Canada until declaring bankruptcy and folding in July 2015. The Rainmen were replaced in late 2015 by the Halifax Hurricanes, based in the Scotiabank Centre.

Rumours of a Canadian Football League team have circulated for decades, with one team, the Atlantic Schooners, existing only on paper. The Halifax Regional Municipality has considered lobbying to have a CFL team located in the area, though the proposal has never been formally endorsed by the municipal or provincial governments. Huskies Stadium hosted Touchdown Atlantic, a CFL exhibition game, in 2005, and planned to host another in 2006, but the suspension of one of the scheduled teams forced the cancellation of the game.

The Nova Scotia Keltics play in the Rugby Canada Super League.

On September 13, 2018 the National Lacrosse League announced it would be expanding into Halifax for the 2019-20 season.

Halifax's first women's professional soccer team, Halifax Tides FC of the Northern Super League, began play in 2025.

The Professional Women's Hockey League play two of their "Takeover Tour" neutral-site matches at the Scotiabank Centre as part of their 2025–26 season, featuring the Montreal Victoire versus the Toronto Sceptres and the Ottawa Charge versus the Boston Fleet.

== Major tournaments ==
The city has hosted the ICF Canoe Sprint World Championships in 1997 and 2009 (both listed as Dartmouth) and will do so in 2022.

HRM has hosted the World Junior Hockey Championships, as well as the Brier and Tournament of Hearts curling championships.

HRM was selected to host the 2007 World Indoor Lacrosse Championship in May, 2007. National teams from Australia, Canada, the Czech Republic, the Iroquois Nation, Scotland, and the United States participated. Canada defeated the Iroquois Nation in the final by a score of 21-4.

The inaugural World Indoor Lacrosse Championship were held in Hamilton, Kitchener, Mississauga, and Oshawa, Ontario, Canada in May, 2003. The World Indoor Lacrosse Championship is an International Lacrosse Federation-sanctioned event.

Halifax also co-hosted the 2008 Men's World Ice Hockey Championships with Quebec City.

In 2015, Halifax hosted the Eastern Canada GAA finals. Teams will compete in Hurling and Gaelic Football. Teams from Quebec, Newfoundland, Ontario and Nova Scotia will be competing. The Halifax Gaels will be hosting the event.

== Canada Games ==
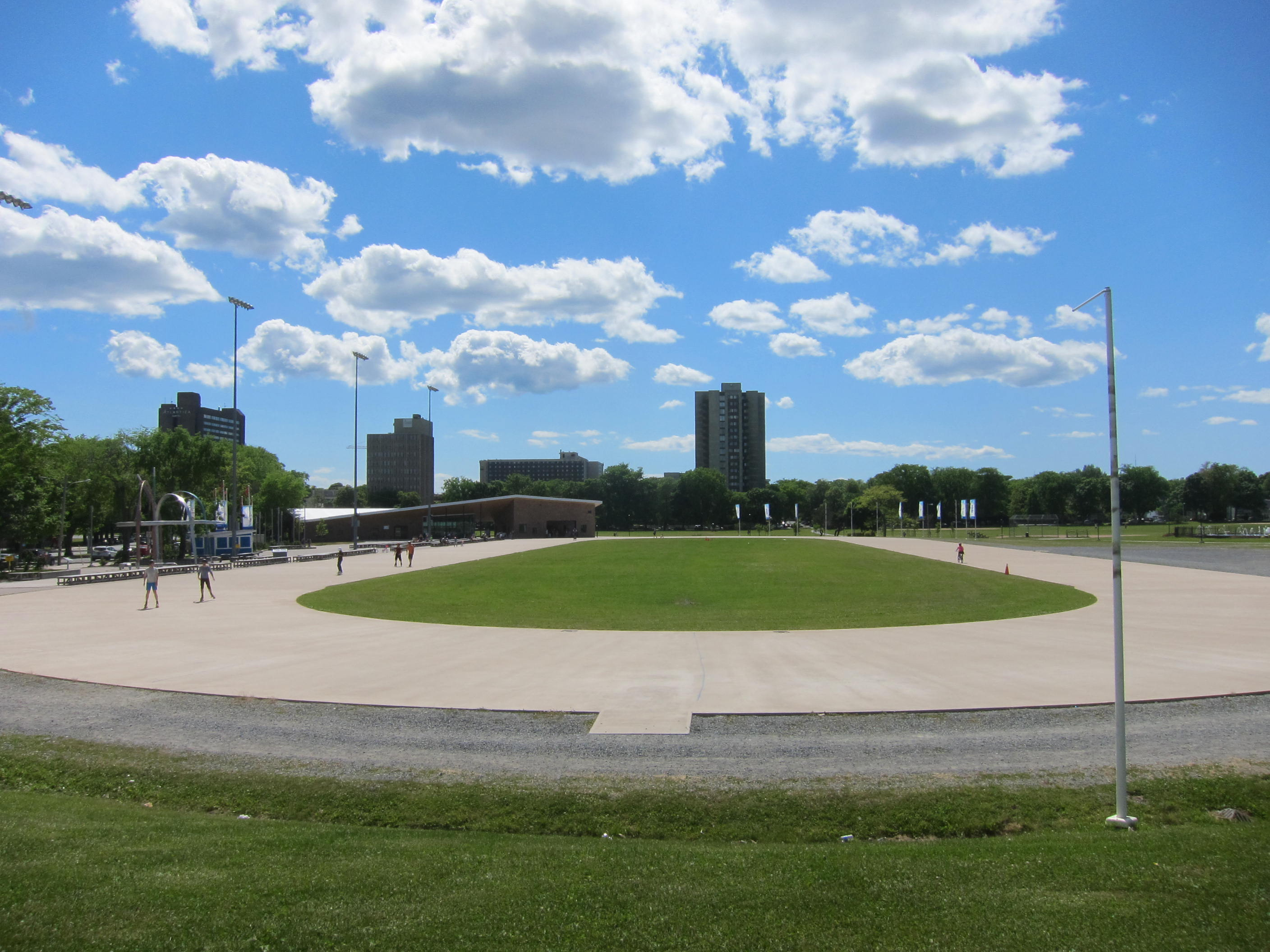
The Emera Oval, built for the 2011 Canada Games

In 1969, the then cities of Halifax and Dartmouth hosted the first edition of the Canada Summer Games. In preparation for the games the cities built a range of new sports venues, including a softball facility, the paddling course at Lake Banook, and the first Olympic-size swimming pool in Atlantic Canada, the Centennial Pool.

In February 2011, the city hosted the 2011 Canada Winter Games. Several new facilities were built for the games, including the Canada Games Centre and the Emera Oval. The skating oval, originally intended to be temporary, proved very popular with the public and was made a permanent fixture on the Halifax Common.

== 2014 Commonwealth Games bid ==
Halifax was selected as the Canadian bid for the 2014 Commonwealth Games, beating other Canadian municipalities such as Hamilton, Ontario, York Regional Municipality, Ontario, and Ottawa, Ontario.

The estimated costs for the games in Halifax were projected at C$800 million, to which the federal government committed $400 million in the fall of 2006. Leaked information projected these costs could escalate to $1.6 billion as the bid committee prepared for submitting the final bid information in May 2007 to the Commonwealth Games Federation.

A major cost was projected to be the construction of a 50,000 seat stadium and sports complex, including an athlete's village, on former Department of National Defence property at Shannon Park on the Dartmouth waterfront. Officials had estimated these facilities would cost $163 million alone. Shannon Park was chosen as the most suitable location since it is situated on the Halifax Harbour where proposed high speed ferries could connect to other parts of Bedford Basin and the downtown central business district, as well as being situated astride several major highways and a rail line.

On March 8, 2007 the provincial and municipal governments issued a joint statement withdrawing Halifax from the bidding process for the 2014 Commonwealth Games, citing the projected costs to public finances and lack of available funding.

Halifax's withdrawal left two remaining bids under consideration: Abuja, Nigeria and Glasgow, United Kingdom. The Commonwealth Games Federation announced at a meeting in Sri Lanka on November 9, 2007 that Glasgow would host the 2014 Games.

== See also ==
- Parks in Halifax, Nova Scotia
