= Bids for the 2014 Commonwealth Games =

Overview
- XX Commonwealth Games
- Winner: Glasgow; Runner-up: Abuja

Details
- Committee: CGF

Map
- Location of the bidding cities

Important dates
- Bid: 24 February 2006
- Decision: 9 November 2007

Decision
- Winner: Glasgow (47 votes)
- Runner-up: Abuja (24 votes)

Bidding for the 2014 Commonwealth Games began from 24 February 2006 until the winner was announced on 9 November 2007. Glasgow won the race and was selected by the General Assembly of the Commonwealth Games Federation (CGF) at a meeting in Sri Lanka to host the games. The vote was 47 votes for Glasgow and 24 for Abuja. The decision was announced by Mike Fennell, the Chairman of the CGF.

== Bidding process ==
=== Bidding timeline ===
The bidding process has a series deadlines and milestones in the Candidature Procedure

The main dates were:

- 2006

24 February 2006 – This was the date when Commonwealth Games Associations / Candidate Cities had to notify the CGF that they intended to bid.
10 March 2006 – This was the date when Candidate Cities had to pay a non-refundable Candidature Fee of £60,000 to the CGF.
9 May 2006 – The bids were lodged with the CGF on this date, or sooner. Candidate Cities were then allowed to produce an emblem with the Commonwealth Games symbol (The Bar) and also contain terminology which stipulates that the city is a "Candidate City" for the 2014 Commonwealth Games.

- 2007

June/July 2007 – The CGF Evaluation Committee formally reviewed confirmed bids.
9 September 2007 – The CGF Evaluation Committee Report was published in London
9 October 2007 – Deadline for any updates by the Candidate Cities in response to the Evaluation Committee Report.
9 November 2007 – The CGF General Assembly in Colombo awards the right to host the 2014 Commonwealth Games.

The Candidate City Manual was published in November 2005. It comes in 4 parts, the first part outlines what is required of the Candidate City during the bid process, the second part provides the structure of the Candidature File to be submitted to the CGF, the third part gives precise instructions on the presentation of a Candidature City's presentation to the CGF. The last part outlines the issues during and after the bid process.

=== Vote ===
The final decision on who was to host the 2014 Commonwealth Games was held in Colombo, Sri Lanka on 9 November 2007 at the CGF General Assembly.

Each bid city made a presentation to the General Assembly, the order of which was determined by drawing lots.

The CGF members voted in a secret ballot and as there was only 2 bids with winner was announced by the CGF President, Mike Fennell in the first round, with the winner only requiring a simple majority.

The results of the bidding process were

2014 Commonwealth Games bidding results
City	Country	Votes
Glasgow	Scotland	47
Abuja	Nigeria	24

== Cities that were considered ==
=== Candidate Cities ===
Three cities submitted bids to host the 2014 Commonwealth Games that were recognised by the CGF. The three cities were; Glasgow (Scotland), Abuja (Nigeria) and Halifax (Canada).

City	Country	Commonwealth Games Committee	Result
Glasgow	Scotland	Commonwealth Games Council for Scotland (CGCS)	Winner
Glasgow Further information: Glasgow bid for the 2014 Commonwealth Games Scotland was the first country to consider hosting the 2014 Commonwealth Games in 2004, with Scottish cities being invited by the Commonwealth Games Council for Scotland to consider making a bid. In September 2004, Glasgow was announced as the Scottish candidate city over Edinburgh (which hosted the Games in 1970 and 1986, and the inaugural Commonwealth Youth Games in 2000) following a cost-benefit analysis by the Commonwealth Games Council for Scotland. The then First Minister of Scotland, Jack McConnell, formally announced Glasgow's intention to host the games on 16 August 2005.
Abuja	Nigeria	Government of Nigeria	First runner-up
Abuja, Federal Capital Territory Further information: Abuja bid for the 2014 Commonwealth Games The former Nigerian leader General Yakubu Gowon was the head of the Abuja 2014 Commonwealth Games bid team, he called for all Nigerians to support the games for the "glory of Nigeria". He suggested that Nigeria would be a prime location for the games because of its unity, serenity, topography and availability of standard sporting facilities. Abuja had recently hosted the 2003 All-Africa Games, The African regional version of the olympics, for which it constructed a world-class National Stadium and games village. It was a hugely successful tournament with more than 7,000 athletes (and larger in size than any Commonwealth Games ever held). The 2014 Commonwealth Games would also be an integral part of national celebration plans for Nigeria's centenary. Abuja airport would be modernised to cater for the sheer capacity of the influx due to the games. This would further boost their bid to host the games. A state of the art light rail transitsystem was included in the bid documents. The Federal Capital Territory (FCT) administration announced that it had awarded a $841m contract for the construction of the system, which would be completed by 2012.
Halifax, Nova Scotia	Canada	Commonwealth Games Canada (CGC)	Withdrawn
Halifax skyline Further information: Halifax bid for the 2014 Commonwealth Games Halifax was selected as Canada's bid for the games, beating Hamilton, York Region and Ottawa in Canada's bidding process in December 2005. Halifax formed a bid committee that was charged with developing funding proposals and infrastructure requirements necessary for winning the 2014 games. The committee was in the process of finalising financial details and infrastructure requirements for the bid during the fall of 2006 and winter 2007 and the project received an initial commitment of C$400 million from the Government of Canada. Leaked information about spiraling costs from C$785 million to upwards of C$1.3–1.7 billion, combined with the bid committee's secrecy and publicity campaign, caused funding partners in the provincial and municipal government to withdraw financial support on 8 March 2007, followed immediately by the withdrawal of funding from the Canadian government, cancelling Canada's bid.

=== Proposed bids which did not go to application ===
The following cities proposed bidding; however, they did not bid or even formally announce their intentions to bid.

- Gold Coast, Australia
- Wellington, New Zealand
- Birmingham, England
- Cape Town, South Africa
- Cardiff, Wales
- Edinburgh, Scotland
- Glasgow, Scotland
- Halifax, Canada
- Calgary, Alberta, Canada
- Hamilton, Ontario, Canada
- York Region, Canada
- Ottawa, Ontario, Canada
- Sheffield, England
- Singapore, Singapore
- Windhoek, Namibia

== Evaluation of Candidate Cities ==
The Report of the CGF Evaluation Commission for the 2014 Commonwealth Games was published on 9 September 2007, John Tieney, the Chairman of the CGF Evaluation Commission said: "The commission believes that the report is a fair and accurate representation of each city's bid, its strengths and the major issues which may arise if the city is selected". Both bids were highly recommended, though Glasgow's was technically superior according to the CGF Evaluation Report that was released in September 2007.
