= 2005 Canadian Paralympic Athletics Championships =

The 2005 Canadian Paralympic Athletics Championships was a disabled athletics competition that took place in Regina, Saskatchewan, Canada in 2005.

== Wheelchair Racing ==
=== 100 m T-34 (Women's) ===
- GOLD: Chelsea Clark

=== 100 m T-52 (Women's) ===
- GOLD: Lisa Franks, Saskatoon, Saskatchewan

=== 100 m T-53 (Men's) ===
- GOLD: Brent Lakatos, Dorval, Quebec: 16.20 sec

=== 100 m T-54 (Men's) ===
- GOLD: Daniel Normandin, Montreal: 15.87 sec

=== 100 m T-54 (Women's) ===
- GOLD: Chantal Petitclerc, Montreal: 18.11 sec

=== 5000 m T-54 (Men's) ===
- GOLD: Jeff Adams, Toronto: 12:14.12
- SILVER: Michel Filteau, St-Jean-Baptiste, Quebec: 12:18.44

== Track and field ==
=== Javelin throw ===
- GOLD: France Gagné, Quebec City: 50.13 m
