= Victoria bid for the 2026 Commonwealth Games =

XXIII Commonwealth Games
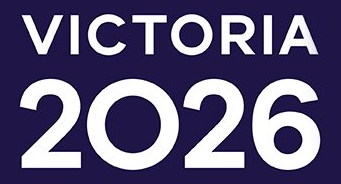
- Bid logo
- Host: Victoria, Australia
- Motto: A Games like no other, in a place like no other
- Opening: 17 March 2026
- Closing: 29 March 2026
- Main venue: Kardinia Park, Geelong (Closing Ceremony); Eureka Stadium, Ballarat; Melbourne Cricket Ground, Melbourne (Opening Ceremony)

The Victoria bid for the 2026 Commonwealth Games, commonly known as Victoria 2026 or VIC2026, was a bid by Victoria, Australia, to host the 2026 Commonwealth Games. The bid was accepted by the Commonwealth Games Federation in August 2022 but was subsequently cancelled in July 2023 by the Victoria State Government.

The games were scheduled to take place from 17 to 29 March 2026 across four regional sites in the Australian state of Victoria: Geelong, Bendigo, Ballarat and Latrobe Valley. The opening ceremony was to have been held in the state capital Melbourne at the Melbourne Cricket Ground, and the closing ceremony would have been held at Kardinia Park in Geelong. In a departure from previous Commonwealth Games, the event would have been held not in one major city, but across a number of regional cities outside the capital. The Games were scheduled to take place over twelve days between 17 and 29 March 2026. It would have been the sixth time that Australia hosted the Commonwealth Games, with the country previously hosting the Games in 1938, 1962, 1982, 2006 and 2018.

== Development and preparations ==
In May 2022, the Victorian State Government allocated $2.6 billion to deliver the Commonwealth Games in the years leading to 2026. This money would have been used to build housing, infrastructure and athletes hubs in each of the four regional sites. The Andrews Government said that the priority was to use existing facilities as much as possible, with spending concentrated on supporting infrastructure. The games were to be held in March to avoid clashes with the Australian Football League calendar in Melbourne. In June 2022, the State Government announced Jeroen Weimar had been appointed chief executive of the 2026 Games organising committee. Weimar is a public servant who rose to prominence as the state's COVID-19 Commander in charge of the pandemic response, and had previously served as the CEO of Public Transport Victoria.

== Venue construction and renovations ==
Though details were being released in relation to venue construction and upgrades for the games, all sports had been consolidated along with their locations. On 12 October 2022 the State Government announced a $150 million (AUD) upgrade to Eureka Stadium and its surrounds. Eureka Stadium upgrades would have included expansion of permanent seating from 5,300 to 10–11,000 after the Games, upgrading of the lighting, and the installation of 18,000 temporary seats. Other upgrades to the precinct would have included the addition of a nearby permanent athletics track.

In Geelong, City Hall has identified the construction of a new indoor arena to host the gymnastics and table tennis events as a "priority project". Additionally, the Geelong deputy mayor Trent Sullivan has hinted at several possible venues for the Games, including using Eastern Beach as a venue for triathlon and beach volleyball, the newly redeveloped Kardinia Park for cricket T20, and new or upgraded facilities to host aquatics. In July 2022 the state government announced that Stead Park in Corio, a suburb of Geelong, would be upgraded to host the hockey events and have a capacity of 15,000 using a mix of permanent and temporary seating. It is to receive two new international-standard hockey pitches and is planned to become the state's premier field hockey facility. Shepparton would have also hosted some cycling events.

A temporary pop-up velodrome would have been installed at the Bendigo Showgrounds and shooting was also to be competed in Bendigo.

== Infrastructure ==
It was expected that the Midland Highway, which links four host cities (Geelong, Ballarat, Bendigo and Shepparton) would receive upgrades in time for the games.

There was a possibility of a new train station to be constructed in Ballarat near Eureka Stadium, and in Bendigo near the showgrounds, however these were later ruled out due to cost constraints.

An athlete's village would have been built in the four host cities, with the villages to be converted to social and affordable housing after the Games. Village locations had been confirmed for the former Saleyards site in Ballarat, at Flora Hill in Bendigo and at Morwell in the Latrobe Valley.

== Venues ==
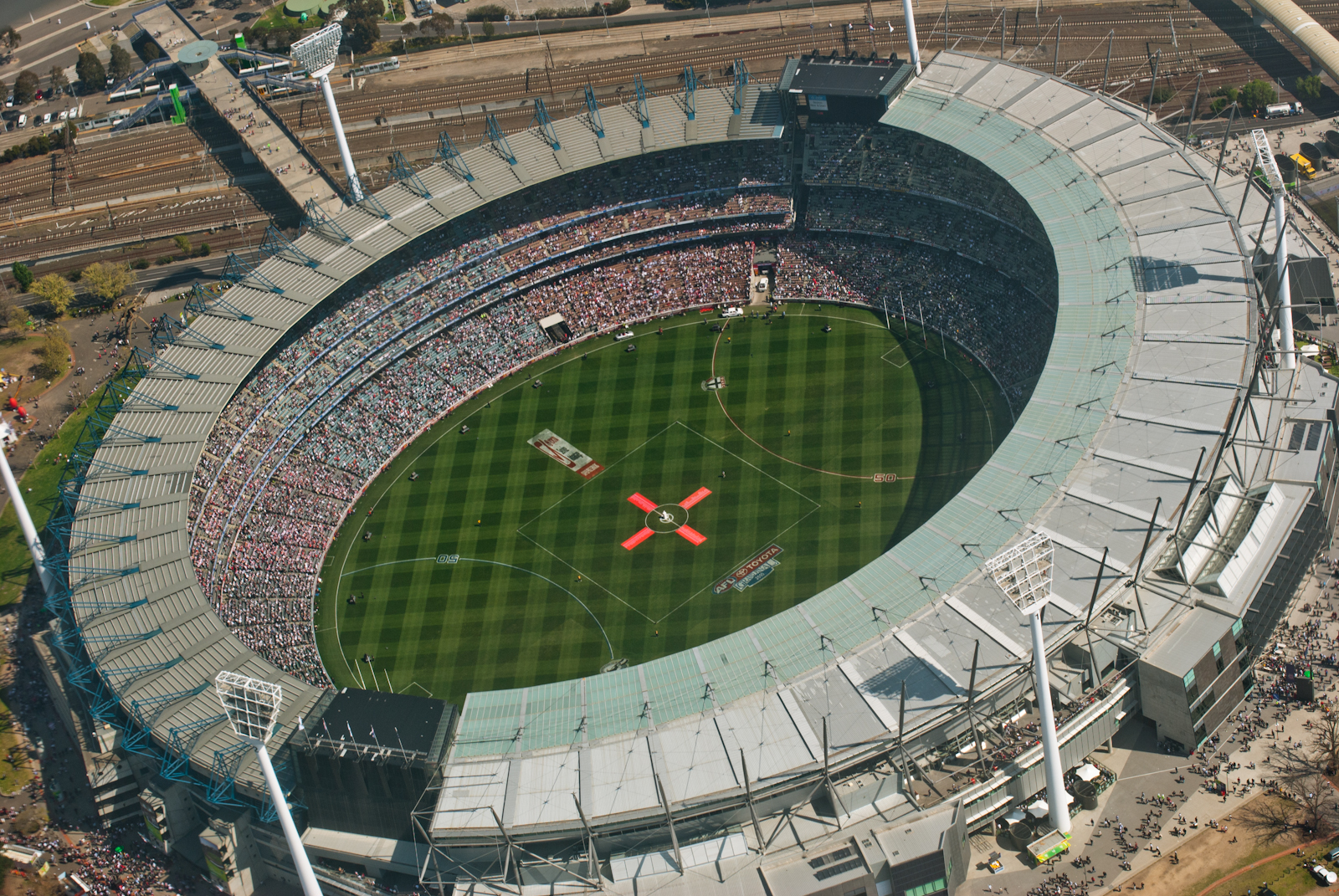
Melbourne Cricket Ground, Melbourne

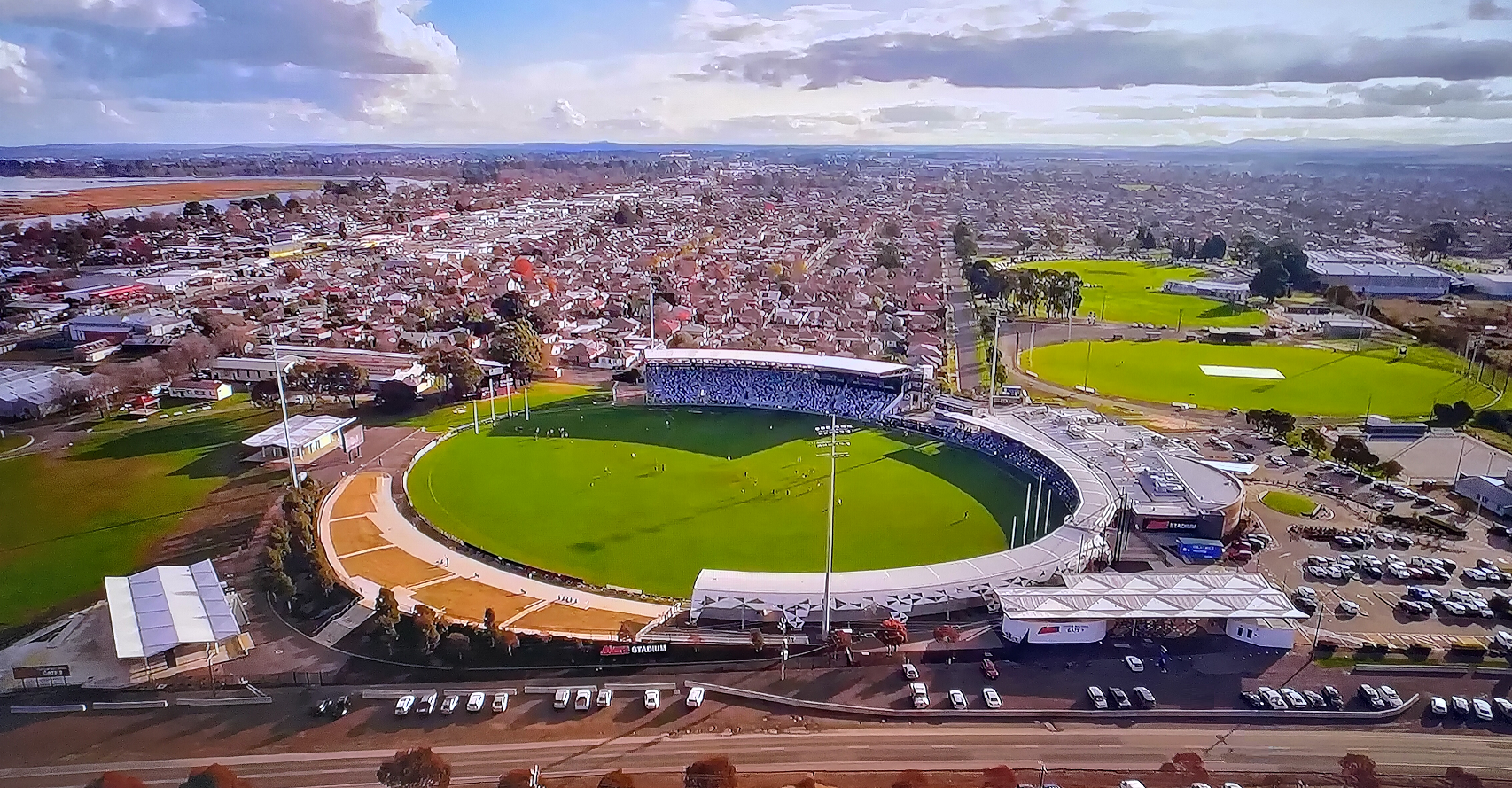
Eureka Stadium, Ballarat

Venues would have been mostly located within Geelong, Bendigo, Ballarat, Latrobe Valley and the Shepparton region. Melbourne would have hosted the opening ceremony in the Melbourne Cricket Ground, acting as a gateway to the four main regional athletics sites, while the closing ceremony was scheduled for Kardinia Park in Geelong.

=== Ballarat hub ===
- Ballarat Sports Events Centre, Wendouree – Boxing
- Creswick trails, Creswick – Mountain Biking
- Eureka Stadium, Wendouree – Athletics (the street events in this sport would have also been held outside the venue)

=== Bendigo hub ===
- Bendigo Bowls Club, Bendigo – Lawn Bowls
- Bendigo Showgrounds, North Bendigo – Table Tennis, Track Cycling
- Bendigo Stadium, West Bendigo – Netball

3x3 Basketball and Squash would have taken place in this hub, but venues were not announced prior to Victoria's plan cancellations.

=== Geelong hub ===
- Eastern Beach, Geelong – Beach Volleyball and Triathlon
- Kardinia Park, South Geelong – Cricket T20 (finals), Closing Ceremony
- Stead Park, Corio – Hockey
- New Aquatics Centre to be constructed, Armstrong Creek – Aquatics (Swimming and Diving)
- New arena to be constructed, Waurn Ponds – Gymnastics, Para Powerlifting and Weightlifting

Golf and Coastal Rowing (in the Bellarine Peninsula and Torquay respectively) would have taken place in this hub, but venues were not announced prior to Victoria's plan cancellations.

=== Latrobe Valley hub ===
- Gippsland Regional Indoor Sports Stadium, Traralgon – Badminton
- Gippsland Sports and Entertainment Park, Morwell – Rugby Sevens
- Ted Summerton Reserve, Moe – Cricket T20
- Traralgon town centre – Road Cycling

Shooting would have taken place in this hub, but a venue was not announced prior to Victoria's plan cancellations.

=== Melbourne ===
- Melbourne Cricket Ground, Richmond – Opening Ceremony

=== Shepparton ===
- Shepparton BMX Club, Shepparton – BMX

Road Cycling would have taken place in this hub, but a venue was not announced prior to Victoria's plan cancellations.

=== Athletes villages ===
- Ballarat – Ballarat Saleyards
- Bendigo – Flora Hill
- Geelong – Waurn Ponds
- Latrobe Valley – Morwell

== Ceremonies ==
The opening ceremony was scheduled to take place on 17 March 2026 at the Melbourne Cricket Ground. The closing ceremony was scheduled to take place on 29 March 2026 at Kardinia Park, during which the Commonwealth Games Federation flag would have been handed over to the representatives of the 2030 Commonwealth Games, which will be known as the Centenary Games.

== Planned sports ==
Under new rules designed to encourage cities to bid for the Commonwealth Games, the CGF required only two sports must be played in future Games: athletics and swimming. Despite this, sixteen sports were agreed to for the planned 2026 Victorian Games, with a further seven the subject of discussion between the governing bodies and the Victorian Government. The list includes T20 cricket, for which a women's tournament was held at Birmingham 2022, alongside the following: swimming and diving, athletics, badminton, boxing, beach volleyball, cycling, gymnastics, hockey, lawn bowls, netball, rugby sevens, squash, table tennis, triathlon and weightlifting. In April 2022, the Indian Olympic Association demanded that the 2026 Games also include archery, shooting and wrestling. In July 2022 the State Government announced that they opened an expressions of interest process for the inclusion of sports beyond the initial 16 planned.

The final list of sports was announced in October 2022, with the addition of 3x3 Basketball, 3x3 Wheelchair Basketball, Shooting, Shooting Para Sport, Mountain Bike Cross Country, Track Cycling and Para Cycling Track added, along with the debut at Commonwealth Games of coastal rowing, golf and BMX. There will be a total of 21 sports and 26 disciplines, of which ten are fully integrated Para sports. Judo, wrestling and rhythmic gymnastics were dropped after featuring in the 2022 Games.

- Aquatics
  - Diving
  - Swimming
- Athletics
- Badminton
- 3x3 basketball (4)
- Beach volleyball (2)
- Boxing
- Cricket (2)
- Cycling
  - Mountain biking
  - Road cycling
  - Track cycling
  - BMX racing
- Gymnastics
  - Artistic gymnastics (14)
- Field hockey
- Golf
- Lawn bowls
- * Netball (1)
- Para powerlifting
- Rowing
  - Coastal rowing
- Rugby sevens (2)
- Softball
- Shooting
- Squash
- Table tennis
- Triathlon
- Weightlifting

== Cancellation ==
On 18 July 2023, the state government of Victoria announced its intended to cancel the hosting of 2026 Victorian Games. Fifteen months after agreeing to host the Games, Premier Daniel Andrews said the cost had escalated to an estimated $6–7 billion, double the estimated benefits, and the government could not justify the expense. The state said it would terminate its host agreement with the Commonwealth Games Federation and seek a settlement of the contract.

The Premier said the state would redirect $2 billion in funding allocated to the Games to a regional development package of sporting infrastructure and housing, including $1 billion for 1,300 regional affordable and social housing units. It also committed to delivering all of the permanent sporting facility upgrades planned as part of the Victorian Games. The Premier told media: "What's become clear is that the cost of hosting these Games in 2026 is not the $2.6 billion which was budgeted and allocated. I will not take money out of hospitals and schools to host an event that is three times the cost estimated and budgeted for last year."

Australian athletes and representatives of regional Victoria expressed disappointment at the decision. The Commonwealth Games Federation blamed decisions taken by the Victorian government for the cost overruns and the head of the Commonwealth Games Australia described the estimated $6–7 billion figure as an exaggeration. The Andrews government had already allocated $2.6 billion to the Games in its 2022 budget and was seeking a 50–50 funding commitment from the Federal Government, but had not received any funding commitment.

Following the announcement, all Australian state and territory leaders ruled out hosting the Games due to the expected costs and short timeframe. The South Australian government said it had previously examined hosting the Games in Adelaide, but concluded it would cost $3.5 billion with only $1.2 billion in benefits.

After it was announced that other states in Australia ruled out hosting, other countries explored the possibility of hosting the games.

== See also ==
- Bids for the 2026 Commonwealth Games
- Durban bid for the 2022 Commonwealth Games
