= Special Olympics Canada =

Canadian disability sports organization

Special Olympics Canada (French: Olympiques spéciaux Canada) is a national organization founded in 1969 to help people with intellectual disabilities develop self-confidence and social skills through sports training and competition.

== About ==
The group is a national non-profit grassroots organization with more than 13,000 trained volunteer coaches. It provides its services through local sport clubs to more than 38,000 athletes. Its programs are supported by corporate sponsorship, fundraising activities, government funding as well as individual donors. This includes more than 12,000 members of the policing community who have supported Special Olympics, largely through the Law Enforcement Torch Run.

Special Olympics Canada is part of a global movement — Special Olympics — that is structured into regional, provincial and national programs and competitions. National competitions are held every two years, alternating between summer and winter games with Special Olympics World Games held in the year following national games. Canadian athletes have the opportunity to participate along with more than 150 other countries in Special Olympics World Summer or Winter Games through selection in the national team program.

== Official Athletes Oath ==
"Let me win, but if I do not win, let me be brave in the attempt." Founder Eunice Kennedy Shriver introduced this oath in 1968.

== History ==
In 1969, the first Special Olympics Canada event was held in Toronto. From that modest beginning, the Special Olympics movement quickly spread across the country and grew into the national sports organization it is today.

== Canadian Chapters ==
- Alberta
- British Columbia
- Manitoba
- New Brunswick
- Newfoundland and Labrador
- Northwest Territories
- Nova Scotia
- Ontario
- Prince Edward Island
- Quebec
- Saskatchewan
- Yukon

== Matthew Williams ==
Matthew Williams has been involved in Special Olympics Canada for many years. He serves as Canada's International Ambassador. Williams travels around and shares his story with audiences amongst other International Ambassadors in order to educate the public about Special Olympics, but also to demonstrate the impact that the organization has on its athletes' lives.

In July 2014, Williams represented Special Olympics Canada at an event held at the White House by President Barack Obama and First Lady Michelle Obama to celebrate the work that Special Olympics as a global organization has done over the course of its existence.

== Dr. Frank Hayden's Work with Special Olympics Canada ==
Renowned for his research on intellectual disabilities, Dr. Hayden is hugely involved in Special Olympics Canada. He studied the motivation behind individuals with intellectual disabilities to succeed in sports. Contrary to common belief that these individuals could not participate in sport because of their disabilities, Dr. Hayden proved that it was actually the lack of opportunity that caused their fitness levels to differ from other individuals without intellectual disabilities. With this knowledge, Dr. Hayden proposed the idea of a national sport competition for individuals with intellectual disabilities to participate in. At this time, Eunice Kennedy Shriver was working on creating an organization with the same purpose as Dr. Hayden's proposal, due to her experience with her sister's intellectual disability. Shriver reached out to Dr. Hayden and the two (amongst others) collaborated to host an event in Chicago, Illinois, which would be known as the first international Special Olympics Summer Games in 1968. In these games, Canada and the US were the only participating countries. Currently, 170 countries compete in the Special Olympic games across the globe. Dr. Hayden is still involved with Special Olympics Canada currently, and was recently inducted into the Canadian Sports Hall Of Fame (Class of 2016) for his contribution to the sport community.

== Sport Participation in Youth with Intellectual Disabilities (SPY-ID) Project ==
Led by Dr. Jonathan Weiss of York University, this project aims to understand what the motivating factors are behind retaining participation of intellectual disabled individuals in sport. Youth across Canada are selected to participate in this research and are interviewed by the researchers about their personalities, feelings and attitudes toward activities. The research group then looks at which participants are still involved with sporting activities after a year of the initial selection and can draw conclusions and suggestions at this point.

== Secret Agent Society (Operation Regulation) ==
Also led by Dr. Jonathan Weiss and colleagues at York University, this project dives deeper into the study of youth with high functioning autism spectrum disorders (HFASDs) and the way emotions are dealt with in their daily lives.

== Funding ==
The Government of Canada is a big supporter of Special Olympics Canada financially. The Government provides $1 million annually to the organization, and will continue to do so as of a February 2014 official statement. Yearly funding now totals over $2 million.

== Official Special Olympics Canada Sports ==
=== Winter Sports ===
- Alpine Skiing
- Cross Country Skiing
- Curling
- Figure Skating
- Floor Hockey
- Snowshoeing
- Speed Skating
- Bowling (5 pin) - 5 pin Bowling will officially become a Winter Sport following the 2018 Special Olympics Canada Summer Games

=== Summer Sports ===
- Aquatics (Swimming)
- Athletics (Track & Field)
- Bowling (10 Pin)
- Powerlifting
- Rhythmic Gymnastics
- Soccer
- Softball
- Basketball
- Bocce
- Golf

== Sport Development ==
The Special Olympics in Canada also run programs in elementary and high schools to help athletes with special needs improve their athletic and social abilities. Active Start is for athletes from 2 years old to 6 years old and FUNdamentals is for athletes from 7 years old to 12 years old. The Special Olympics in Ontario also supports Sport Festival Programs which provide young athletes a one day introduction to sports in the Special Olympics. This is done throughout the province in various elementary schools.

== 2014 Summer Games ==
The Special Olympics Canada summer games were held in Vancouver, British Columbia at the University of British Columbia. More than 2,000 athletes participated in a multitude of sports, including three sports making their Special Olympics Canada debuts: golf, bocce and basketball. In these Games, each of the 12 chapters competed to determine the official Team Canada roster for the upcoming World Summer Games.

== 2015 World Summer Games ==
The World Summer Games were held in Los Angeles, California] from July 25 to August 2, 2015. Team Canada has a roster of 115 athletes and 32 coaches participating in the Games. The athletes range in age from 14 to 68. It is many of their first times participating in Special Olympics on the world stage.

== Special Olympics Canada in the News ==
In October 2014, The Honourable Candice Bergen, Minister of State (Social Development) addressed Special Olympics Canada to publicly emphasize the benefits of a Registered Disability Savings Plan (RDSP). The RDSP can help families of individuals with intellectual disabilities with saving money. Minister Bergen's goal was to help more Canadians that are eligible for this plan be more proactive on seeking out the RDSP as a way to balance their finances and save money in the long run. The meeting, which consisted of Minister Bergen and Special Olympics Canada executives, was well received by the organization.
